= Grammy Award for Best Musical Theater Album =

Music award

- Awarded for: Quality musical theater cast recordings
- Country: United States
- Presented by: National Academy of Recording Arts and Sciences
- First award: The Music Man (1959)
- Currently held by: Buena Vista Social Club (2026)
- Website: grammy.com

The Grammy Award for Best Musical Theater Album has been awarded since 1959. The award is generally given to the album's producers, principal vocalist(s), and the composer and lyricist if they have written a new score which comprises 51% or more playing time of the album, though the number of recipients has varied over the category's tenure.

The inaugural award was presented at the 1st Grammy Awards to composer Meredith Willson for his work on his 1957 musical The Music Man. Ethel Merman and Gwen Verdon became the first female recipients the in 1960 when they tied for Gypsy and Redhead. Thomas Z. Shepard holds the record for most nominations in the category, with 25, while also being tied with Stephen Sondheim for the record for most wins, with six. Tommy Krasker holds the record for most nominations without a win, with twelve. Micki Grant became the first African-American woman to win this award for Don't Bother Me, I Can't Cope (1973). To date, two-time recipient Phillipa Soo is the only woman to win more than one award (for Hamilton and Into the Woods).

Among shows, cast recordings from Gypsy have been nominated five times and cast recordings of West Side Story, Into the Woods, and Sweeney Todd: The Demon Barber of Fleet Street have been nominated four times, with Gypsy, West Side Story, Into the Woods, and Les Misérables are the only shows to win twice. Anything Goes, Hello, Dolly!, The King and I, and My Fair Lady hold the record for most nominations without a win, with three. The current recipient of the award is Buena Vista Social Club, which won at the 67th Annual Grammy Awards in 2026.

== Process ==
Over the years, the qualifications for the individual nominees has fluctuated with principal artists, composers, and producers at one point being the sole eligible nominee, to the current (as of the 66th Grammy Awards) standard which is as follows: "For albums containing greater than 51% playing time of new recordings. Award to the principal vocalist(s), and the album producer(s) of 50% or more playing time of the album. The lyricist(s) and composer(s) of 50 % or more of a score of a new recording are eligible for an Award if any previous recording of said score has not been nominated in this category."

Vocalists were first awarded in this category at the 54th Annual Grammy Awards in 2012. When an album does not feature any individual soloists and predominantly features an ensemble cast, no individual award is given to the members of the ensemble, with each member instead receiving a winners certificate. As of the 63rd Annual Grammy Awards, only a maximum of four principal vocalists can be awarded (previously unlimited), in addition to the producer/s and lyricists/composers. The maximum number of eligible principal vocalist(s) was increased to six beginning at the 68th Annual Grammy Awards.

Years reflect the year in which the Grammy Awards were handed out, for music released in the previous year.

== Name changes ==
This award has had several minor name changes:

- In 1959 the award was known as Best Original Cast Album (Broadway or TV)
- In 1960 it was awarded as Best Broadway Show Album
- In 1961 it was awarded as Best Show Album (Original Cast)
- From 1962 to 1963 it was awarded as Best Original Cast Show Album
- From 1964 to 1973 it was awarded as Best Score from an Original Cast Show Album
- From 1974 to 1975 it was awarded as Best Score from the Original Cast Show Album
- From 1976 to 1986 it was awarded as Best Cast Show Album
- From 1987 to 1991 it was awarded as Best Musical Cast Show Album
- From 1992 to 2011 it was awarded as Best Musical Show Album
- From 2012 it has been known as Best Musical Theater Album.

== Winners and nominees ==
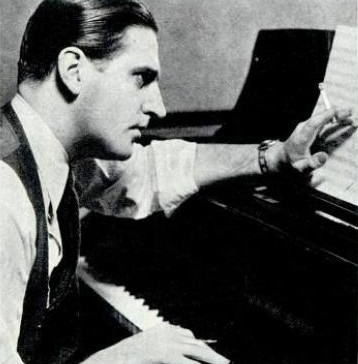
Inaugural recipient Meredith Willson won for The Music Man (1959).

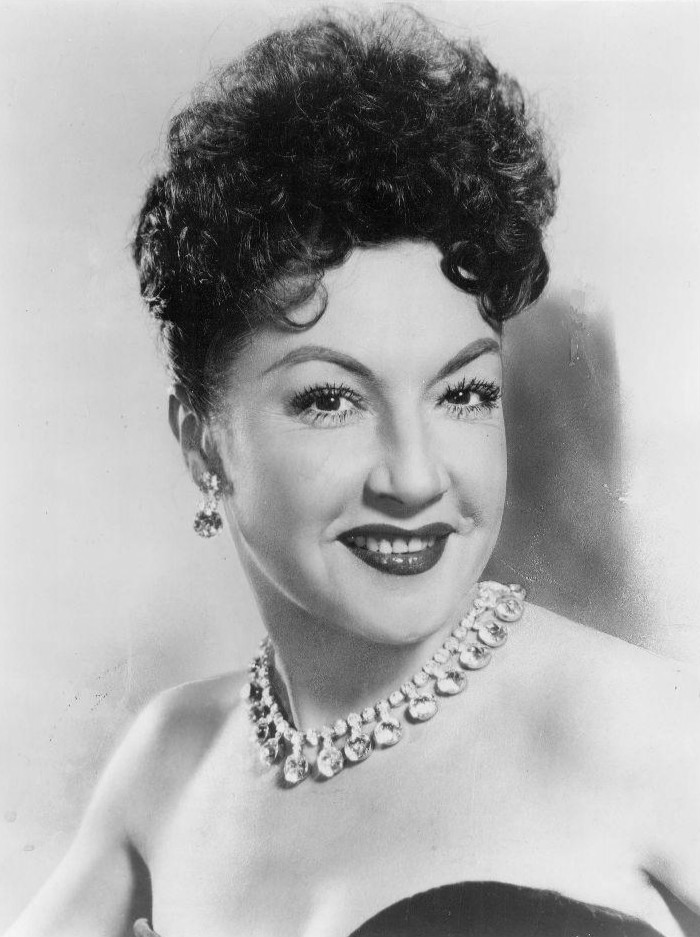
Ethel Merman won for Gypsy.

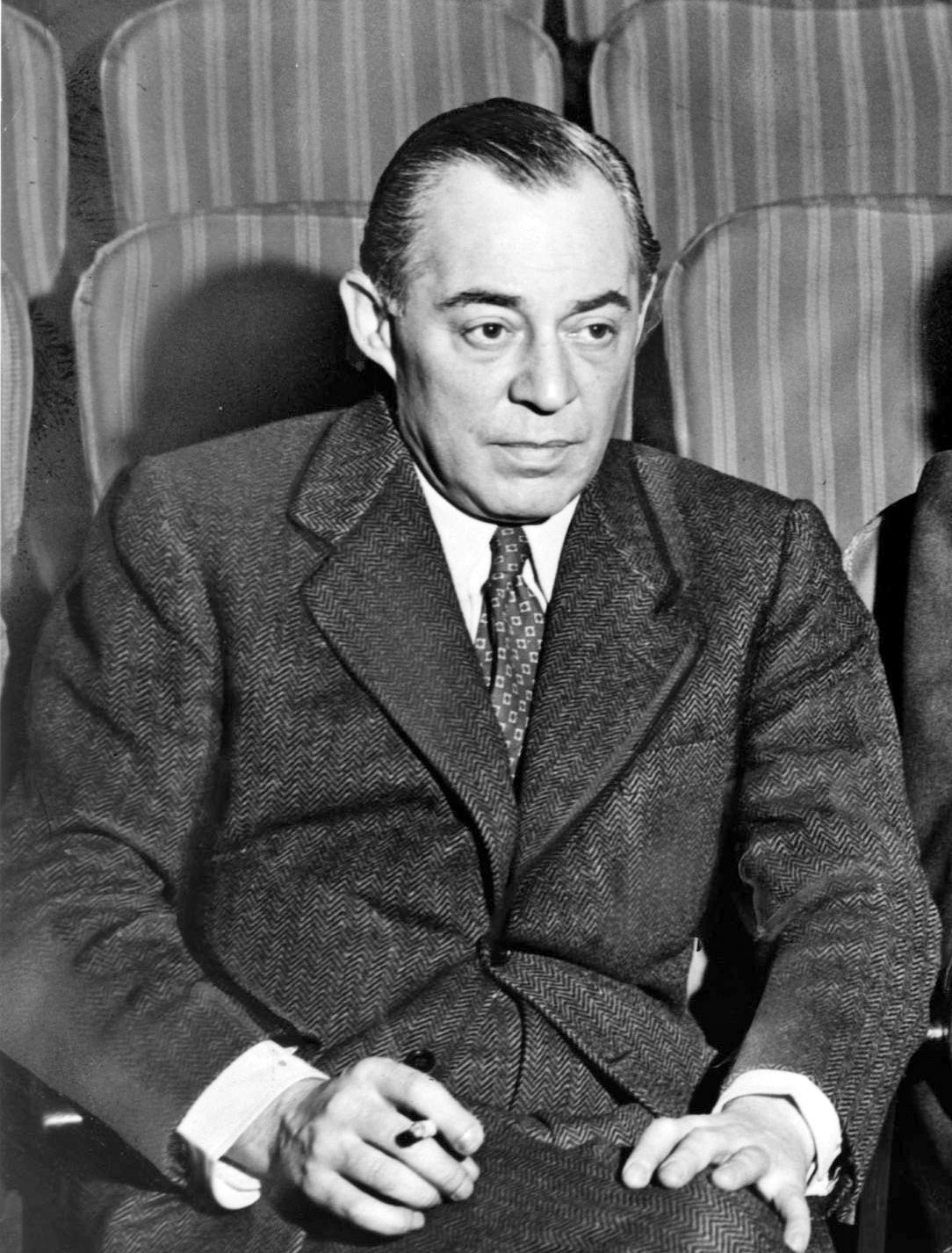
Richard Rodgers (Note: received five nominations and two wins) won twice for The Sound of Music (1961) and No Strings (1963).

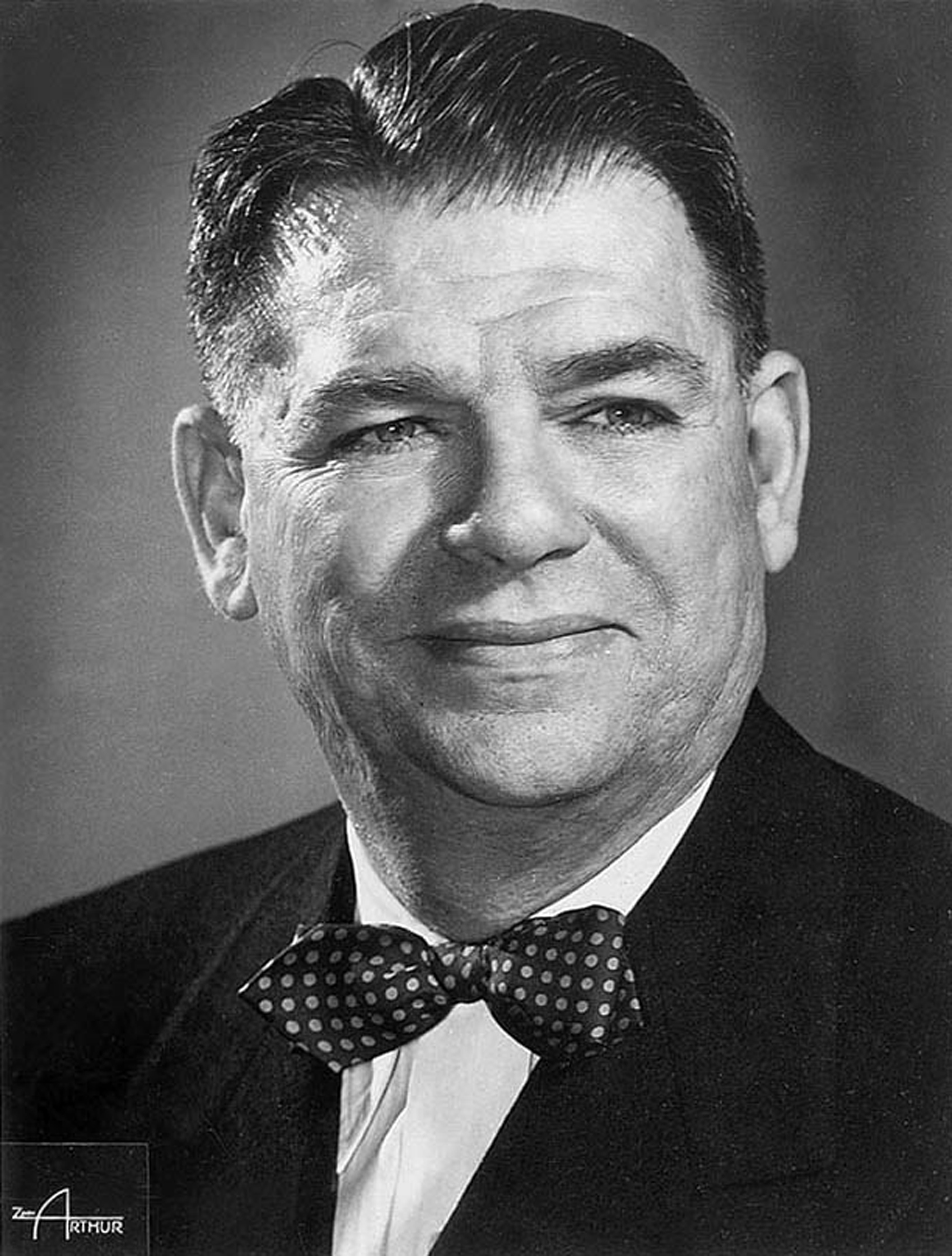
Oscar Hammerstein II won for The Sound of Music in 1961.

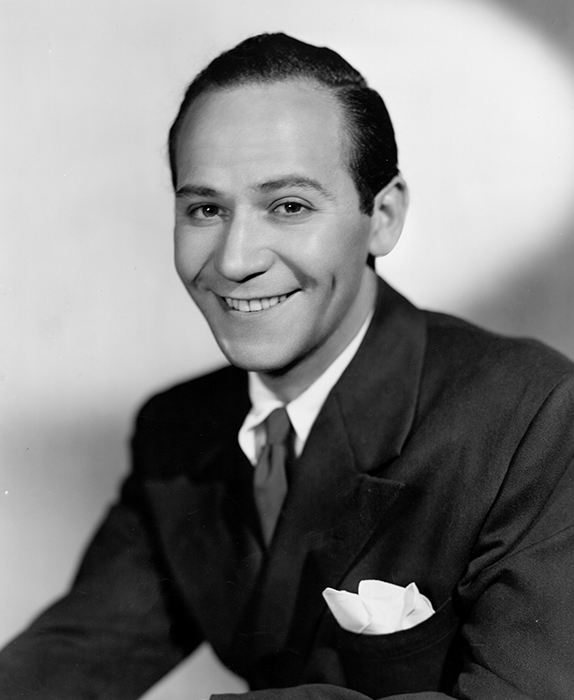
Frank Loesser won for How to Succeed in Business Without Really Trying (1962).

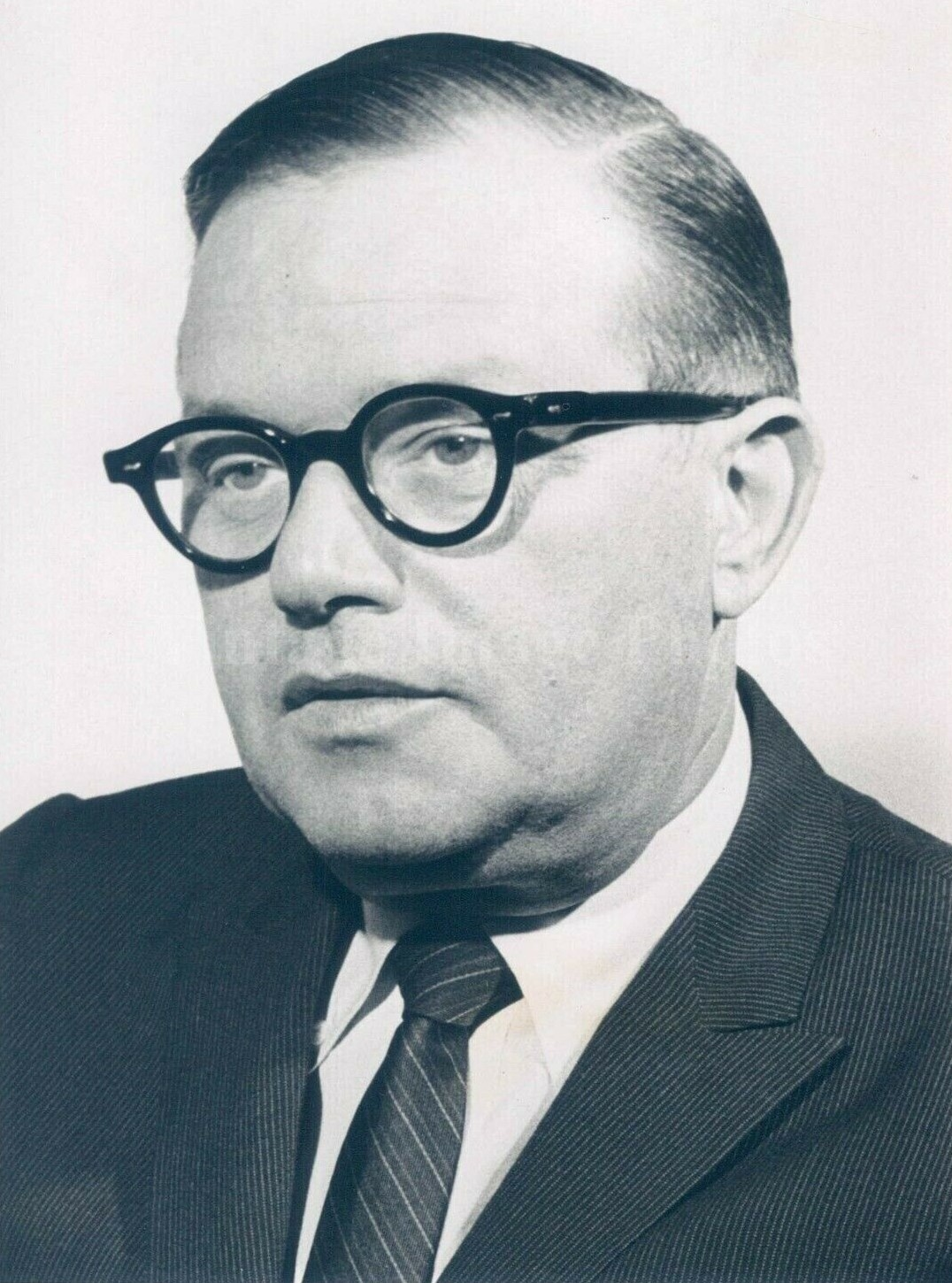
Jule Styne won for Funny Girl (1965).

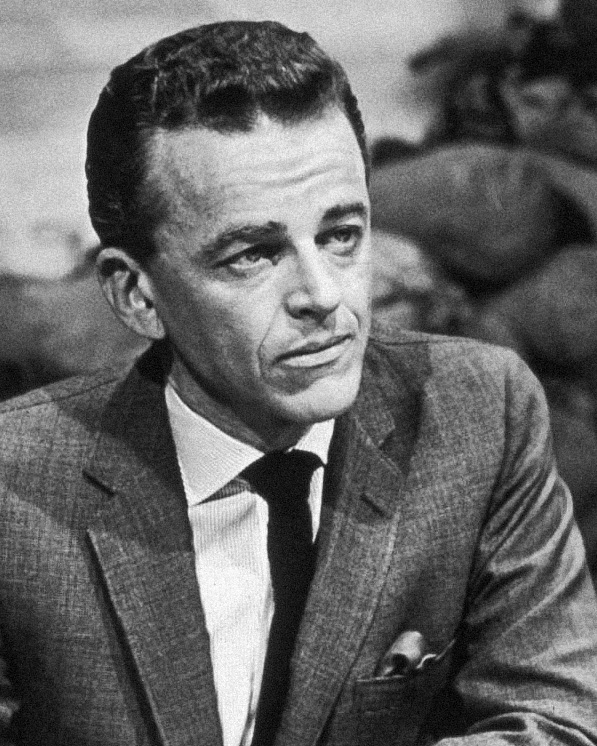
Alan Jay Lerner won for On a Clear Day You Can See Forever (1966).

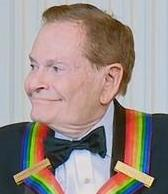
Jerry Herman won for Mame (1967).

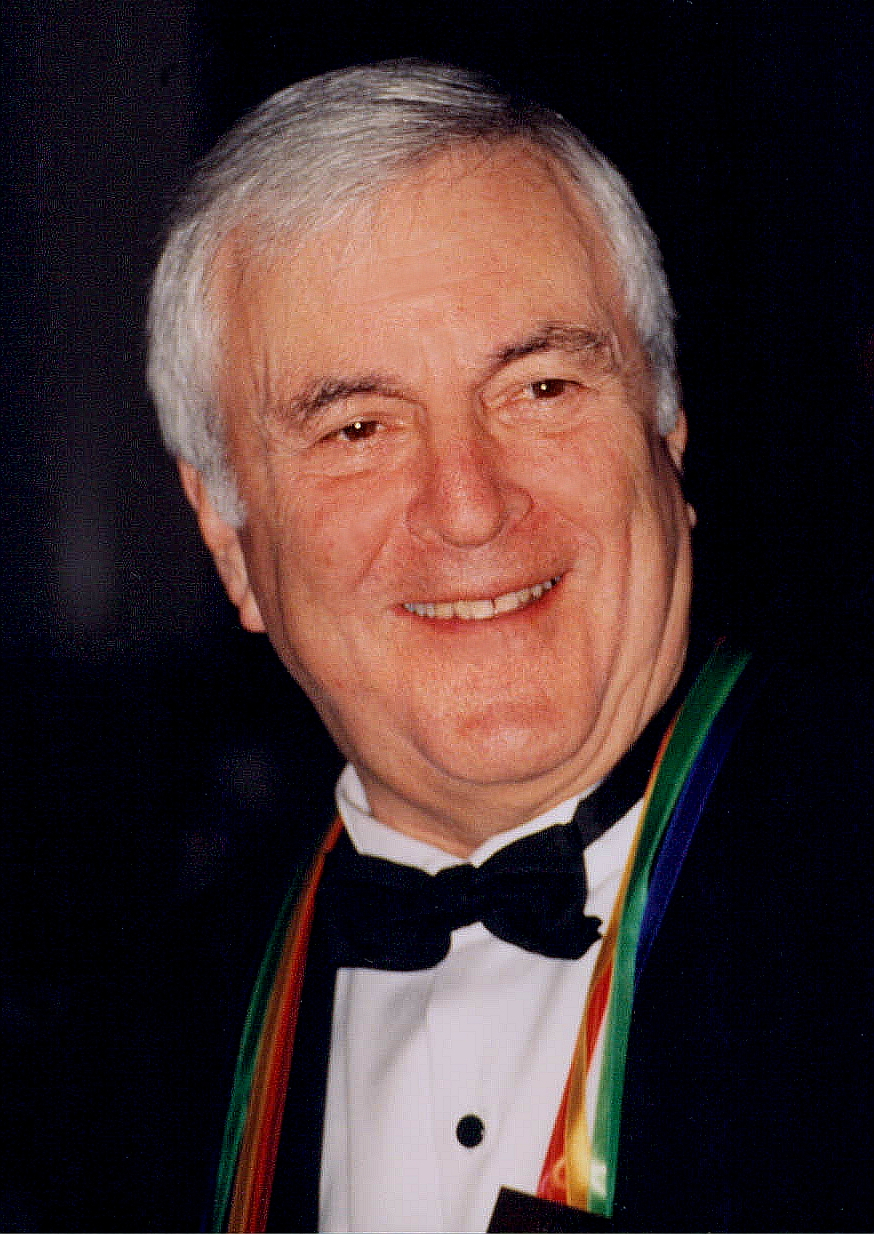
John Kander won for Cabaret (1968).

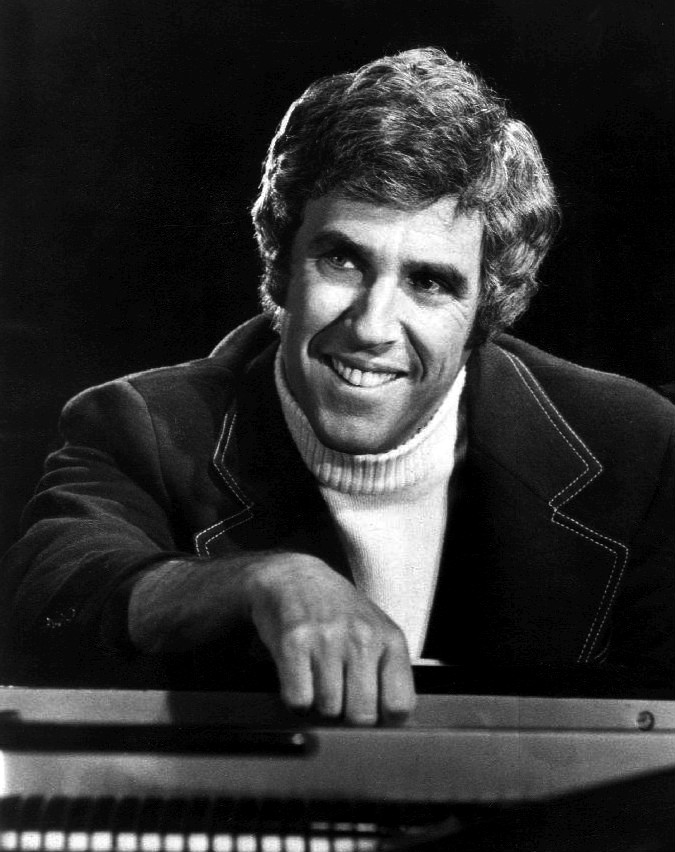
Burt Bacharach won for Promises, Promises (1970)

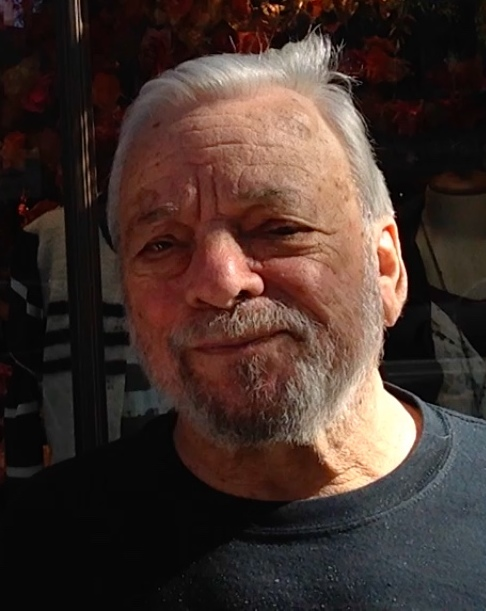
Stephen Sondheim (Note: holds the record for most wins in this category with six wins among 11 nominations) won six times for Company (1971), A Little Night Music (1974), Sweeney Todd (1980), Sunday in the Park with George (1985), Into the Woods (1989), and Passion (1995)

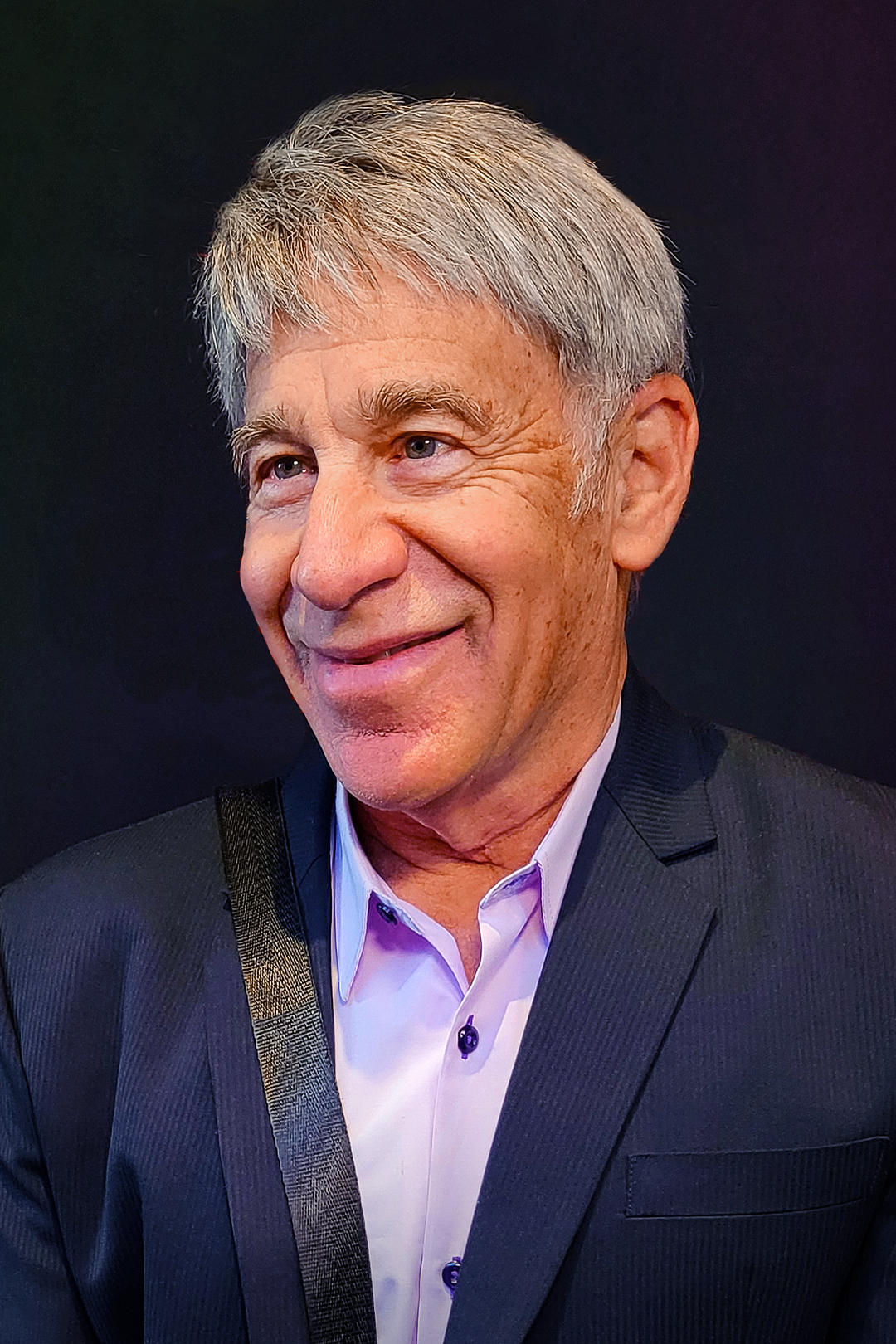
Stephen Schwartz won twice for Godspell (1972) and Wicked (2005)

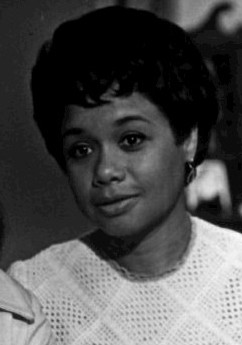
Micki Grant won for Don't Bother Me, I Can't Cope (1973), becoming the first African-American woman to win this award.

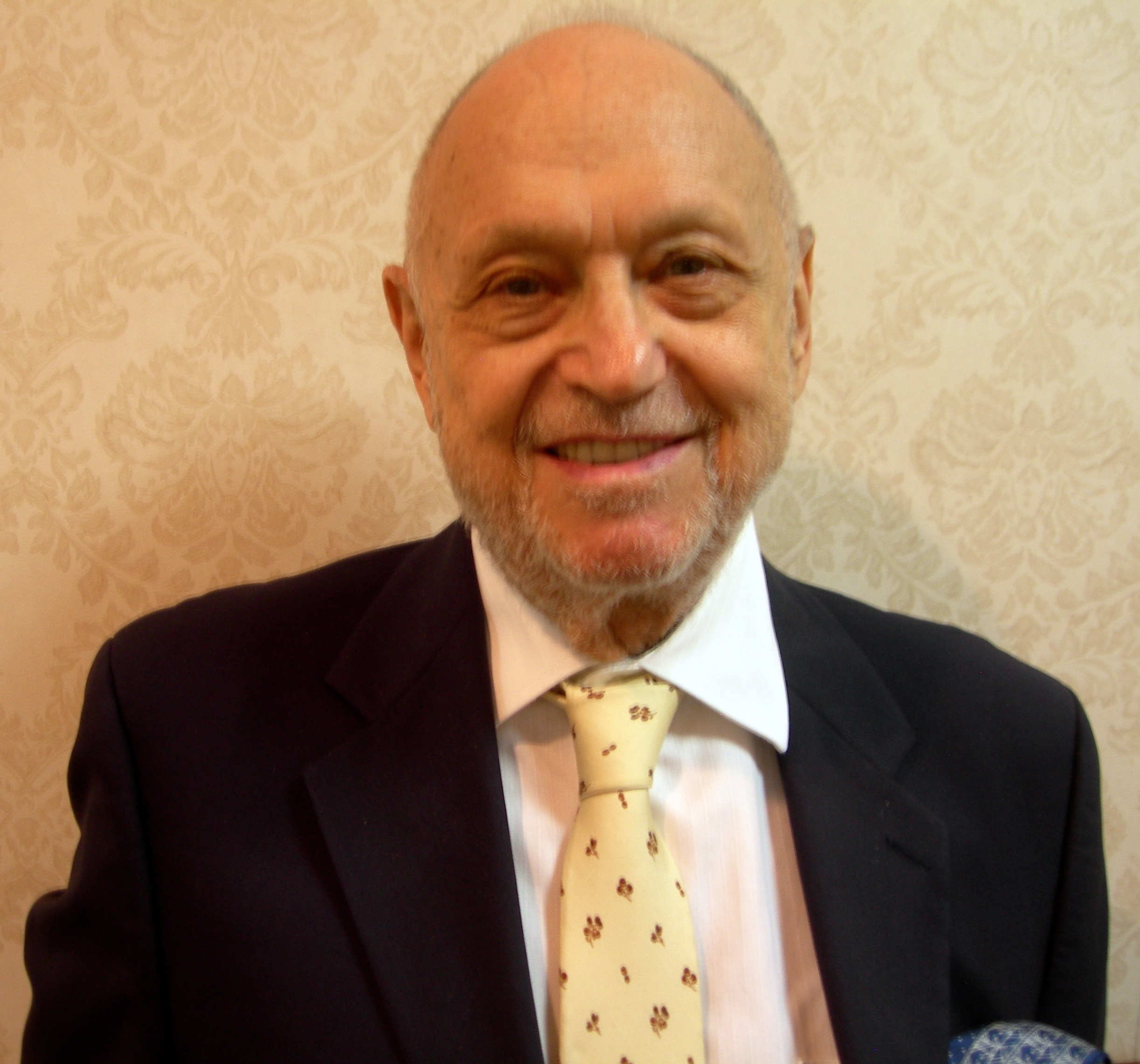
Charles Strouse won for Annie (1978).

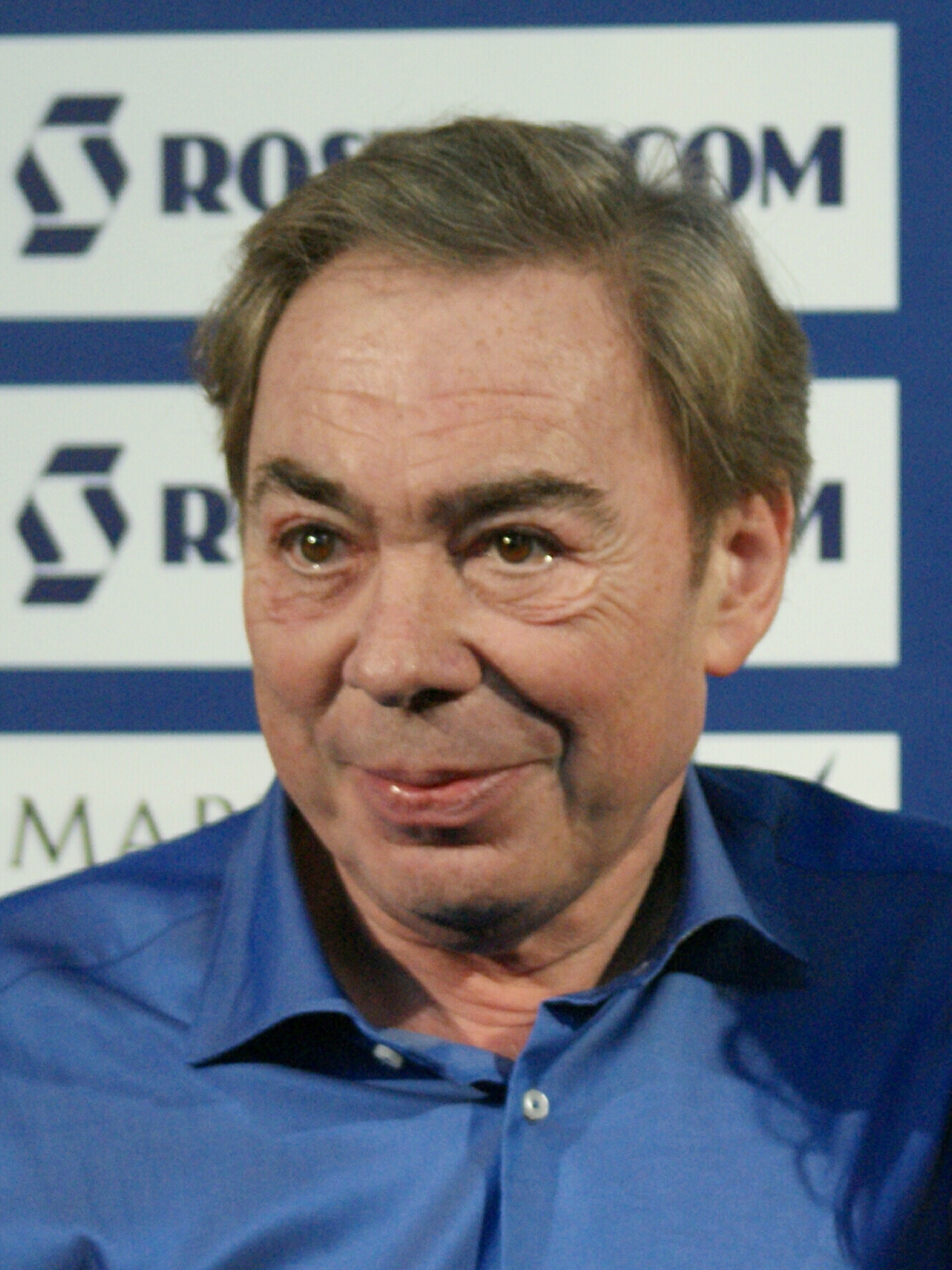
Two-time winner Andrew Lloyd Webber received awards in 1981 and 1984 for his hit shows Evita and Cats, respectively.

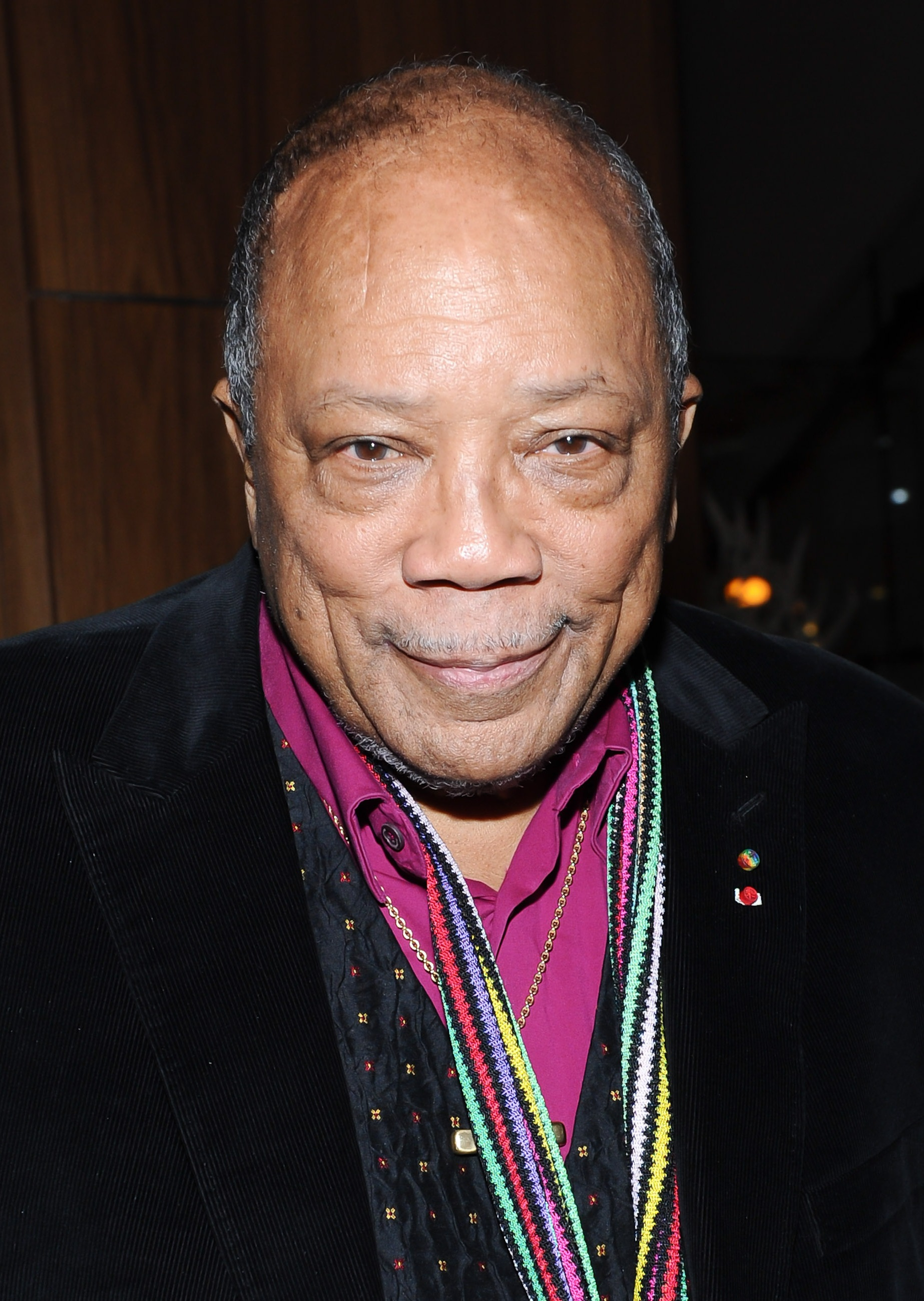
Quincy Jones won the award in 1982.

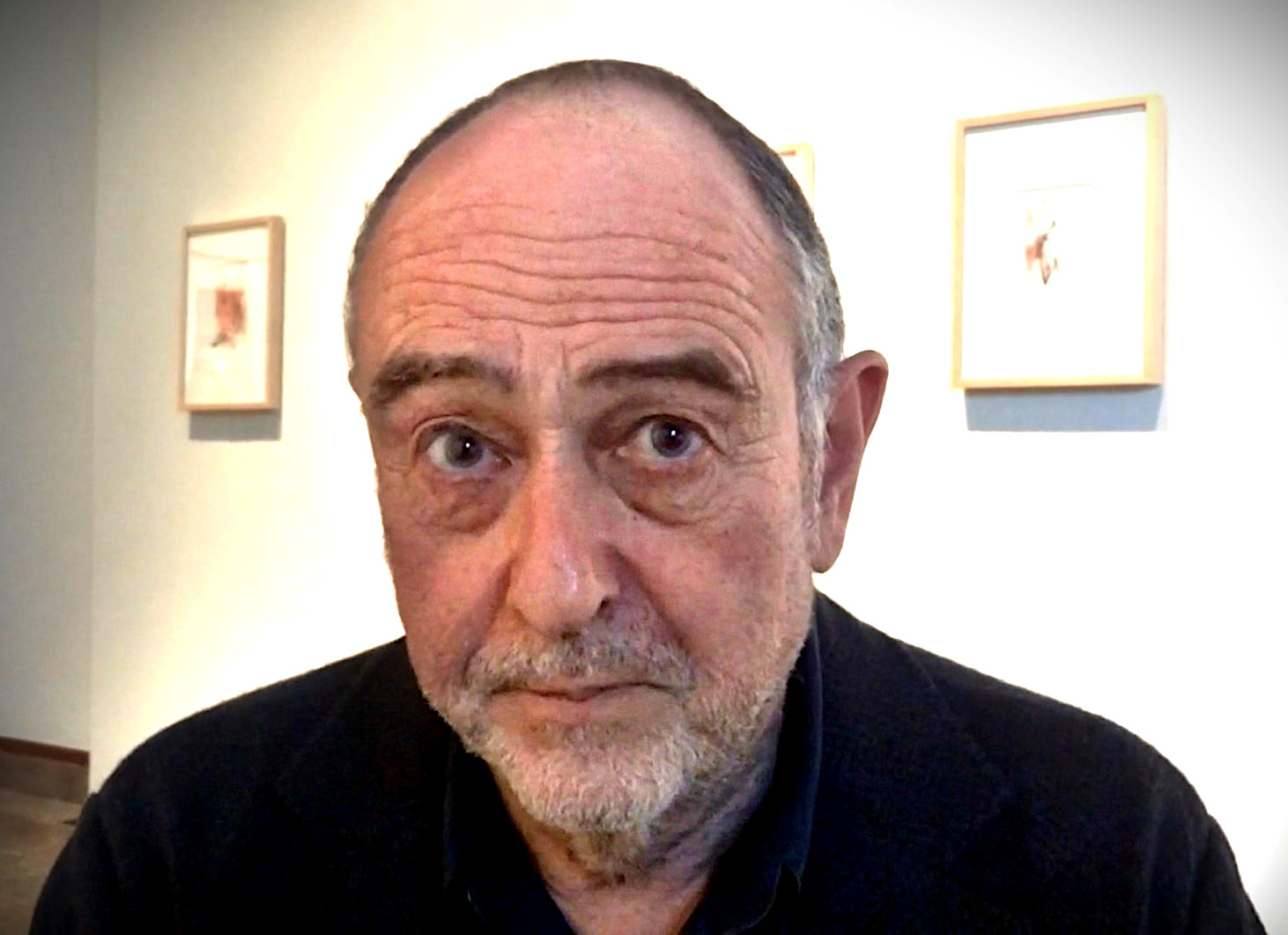
Claude-Michel Schönberg won for Les Misérables (1988)

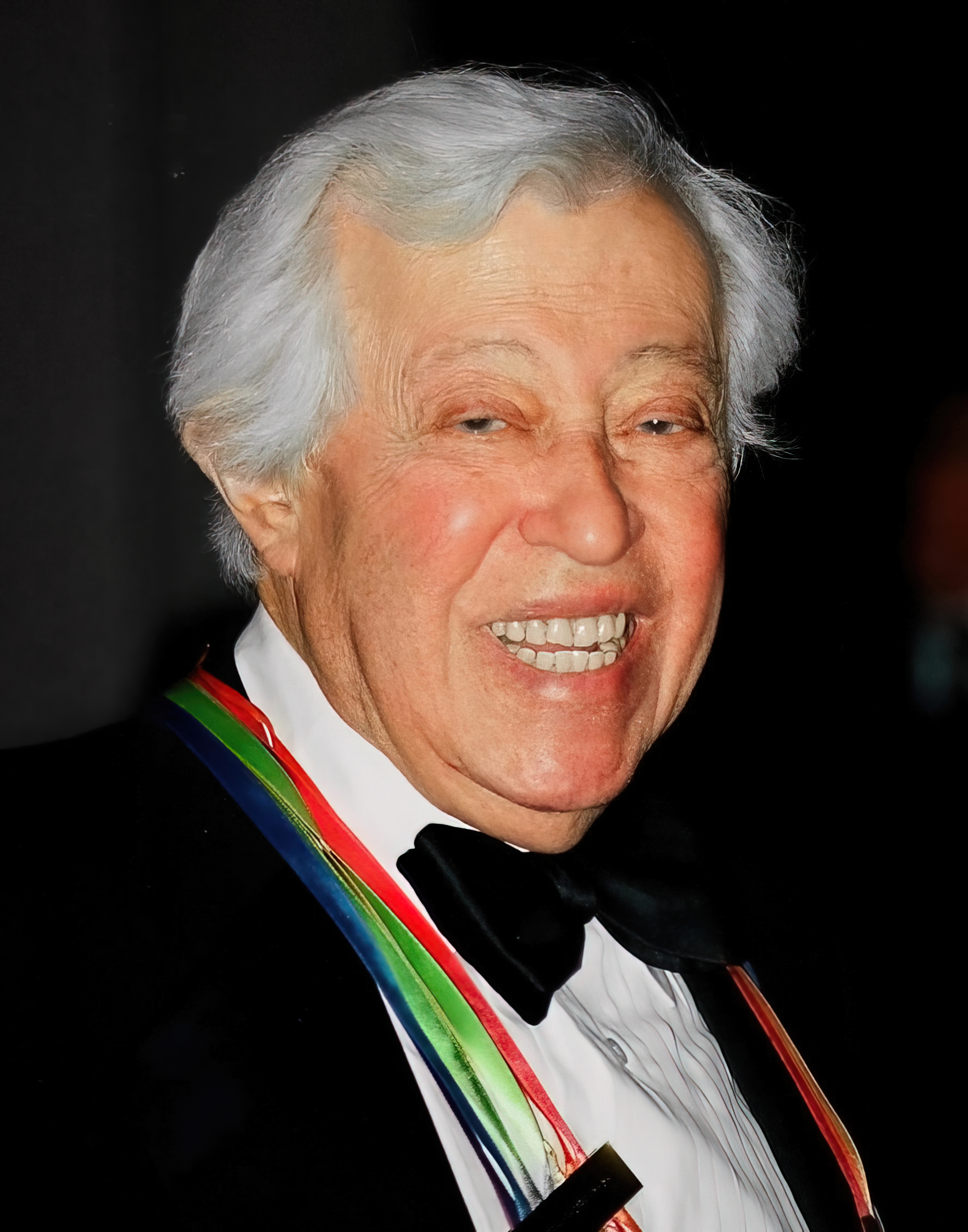
Adolph Green won with his writing partner Betty Comden for The Will Rogers Follies (1992)

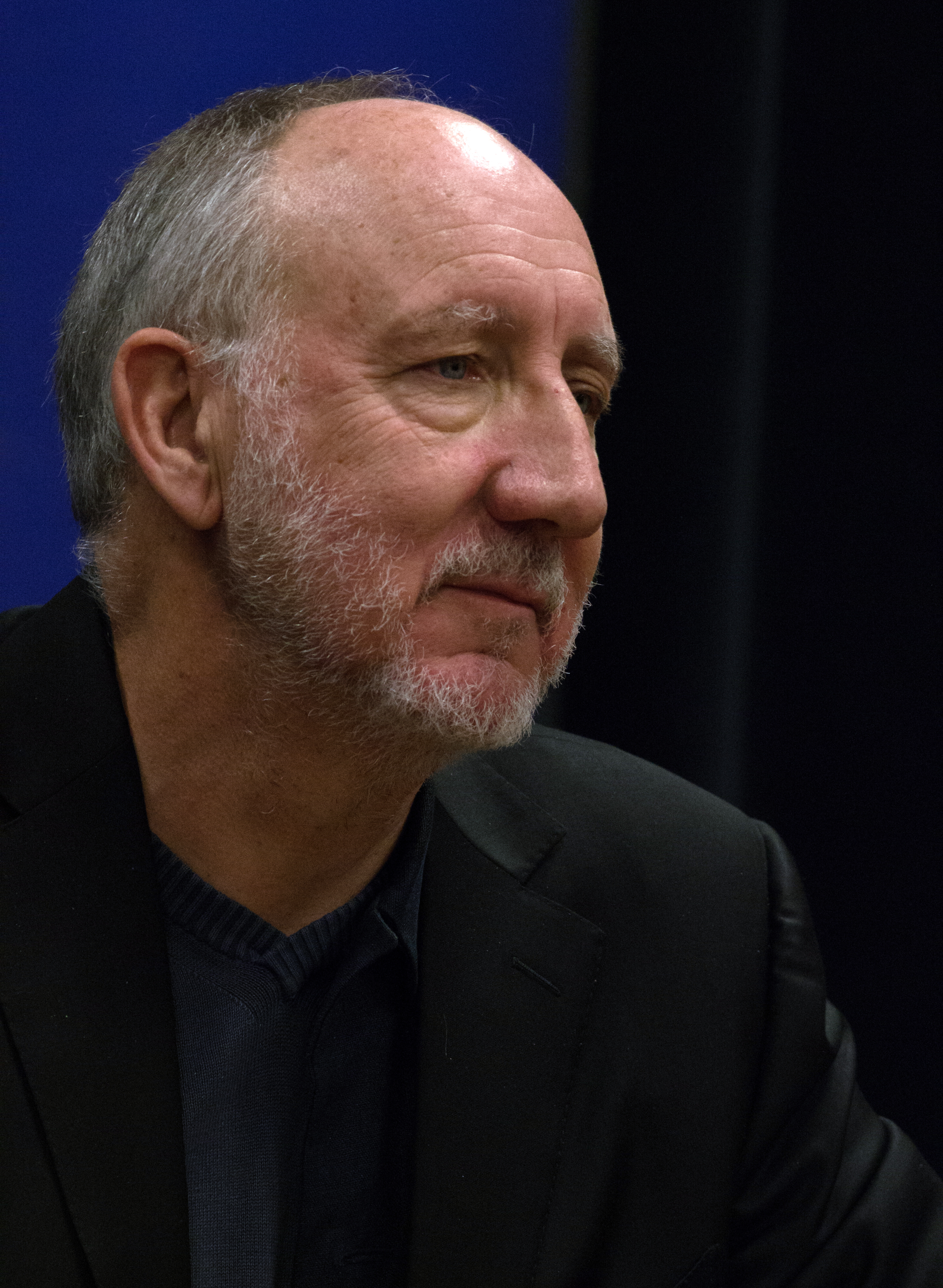
Pete Townshend won for The Who's Tommy (1994).

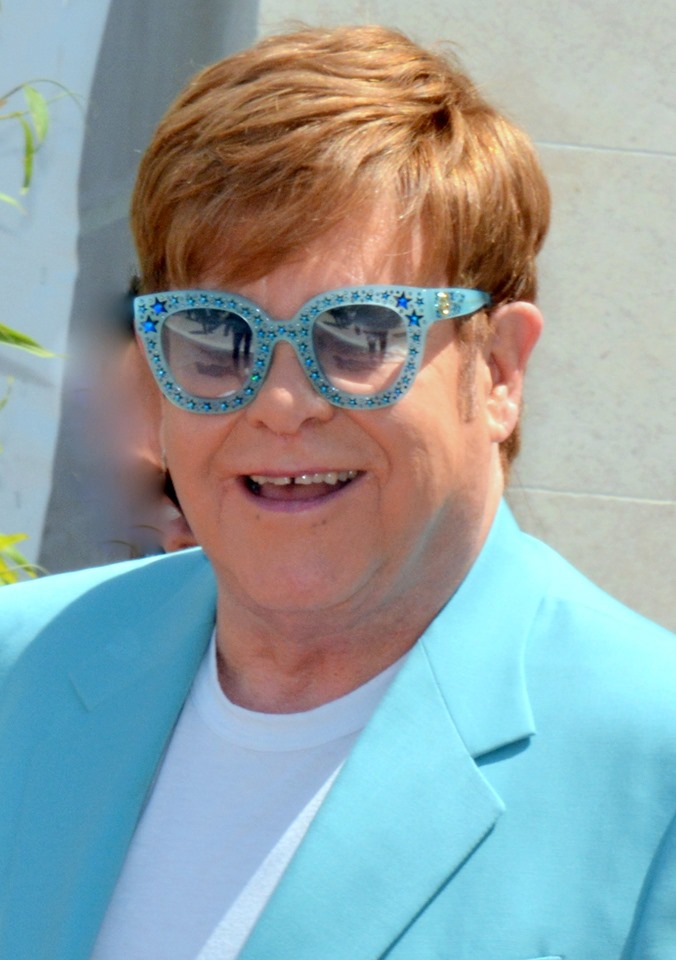
EGOT winner Sir Elton John won for Aida (2001).

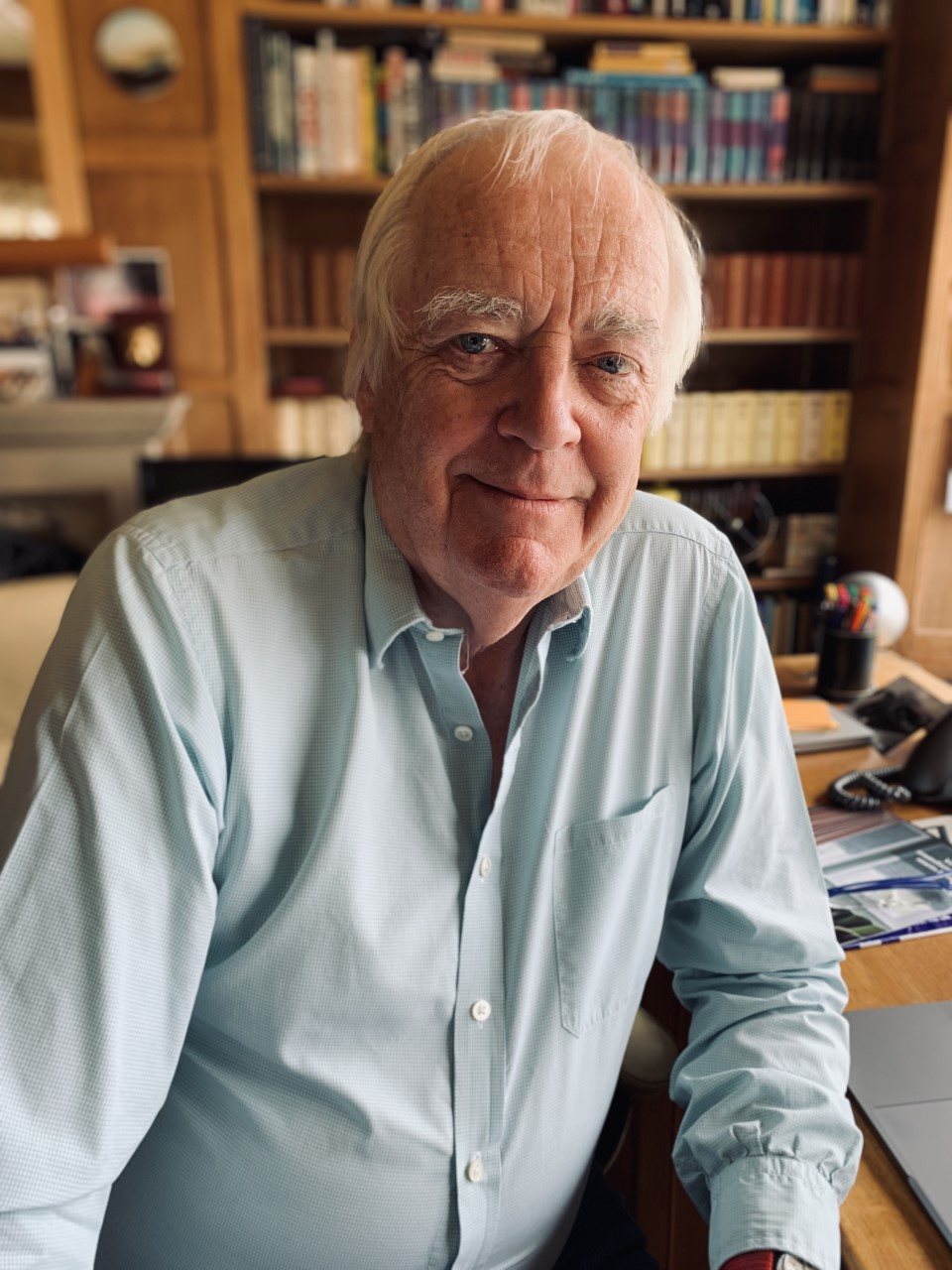
Tim Rice won with Sir Elton for Aida (2001).

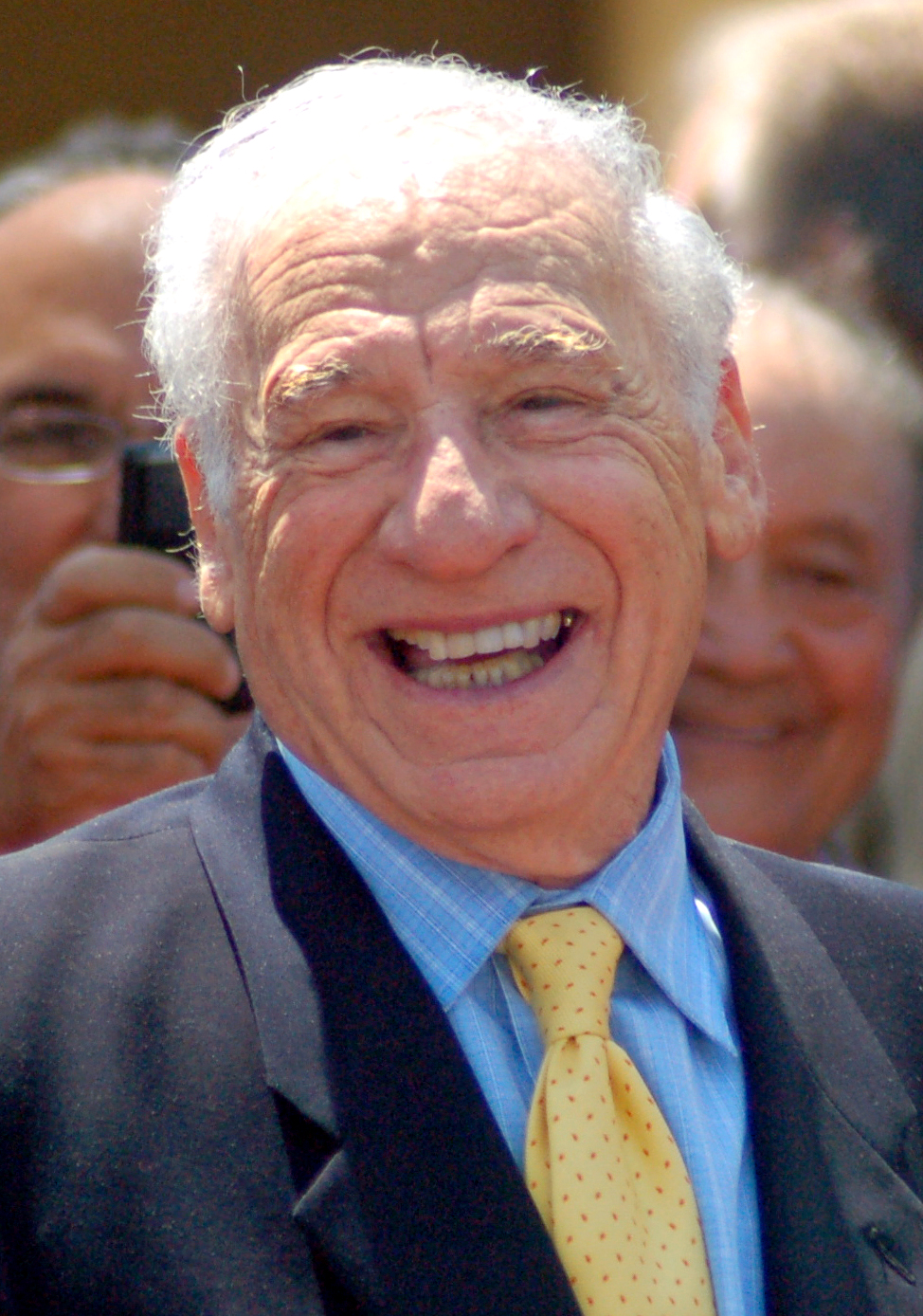
Mel Brooks won for The Producers (2002).

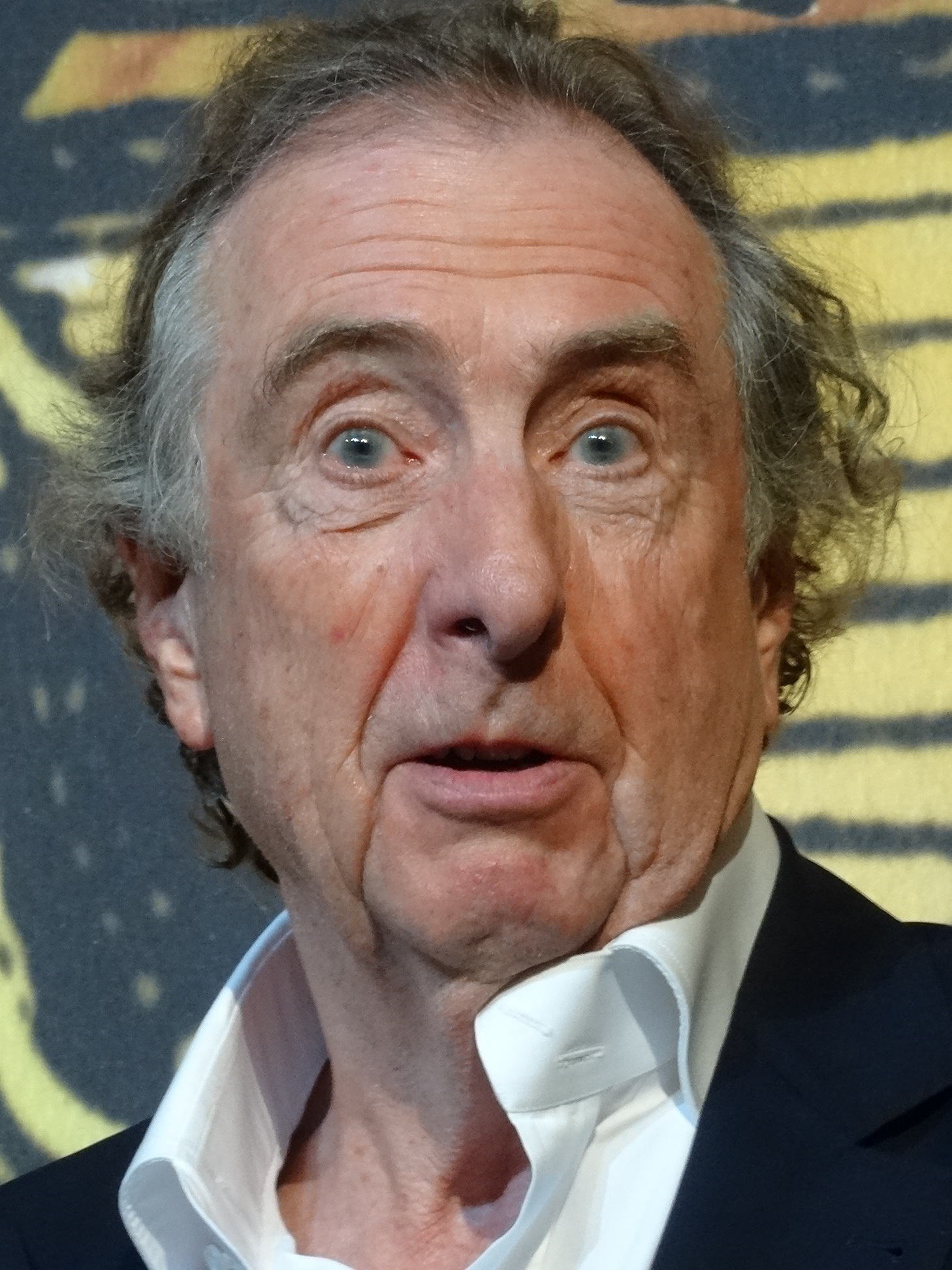
Eric Idle won for Spamalot (2006).

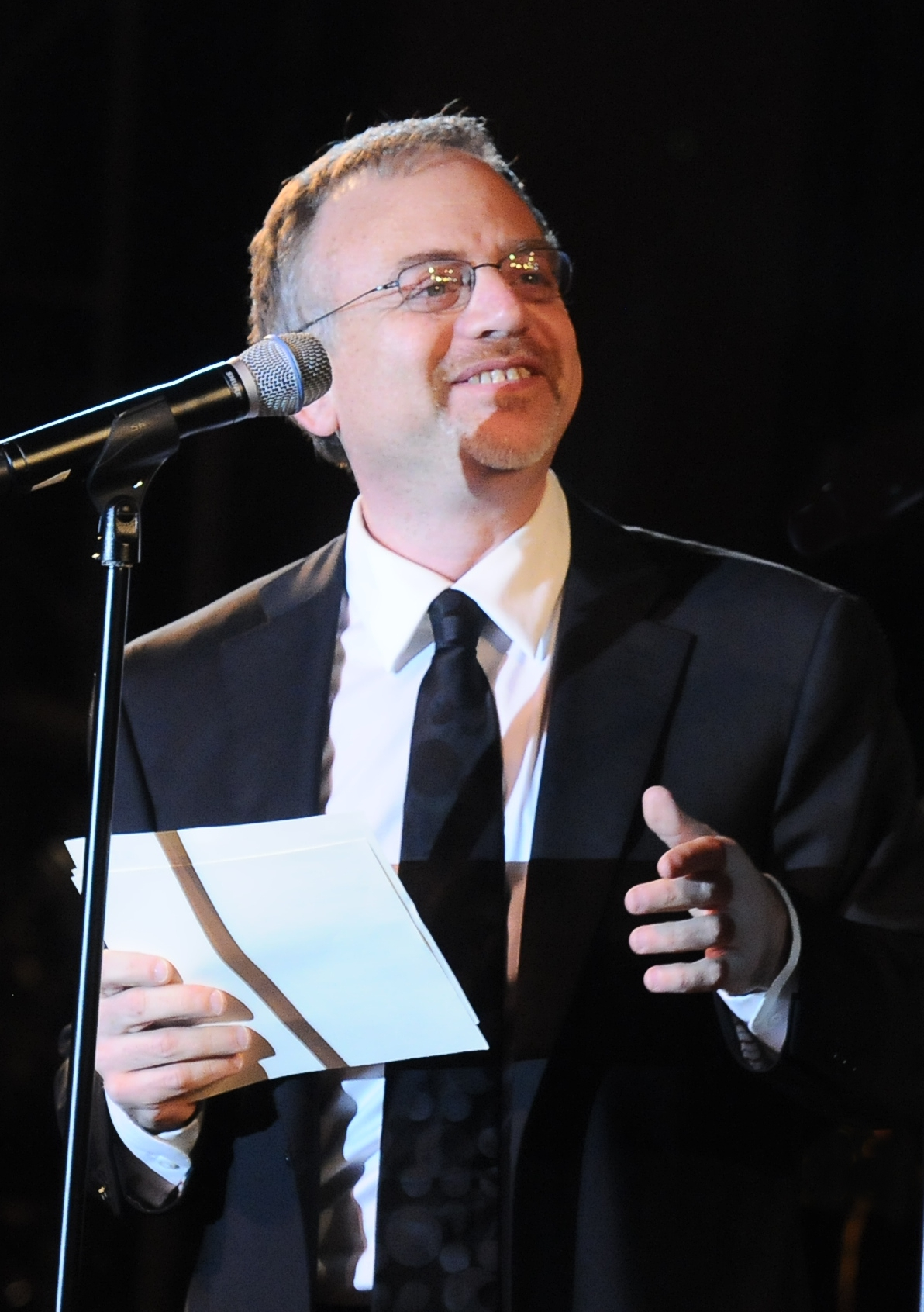
Marc Shaiman won twice for Hairspray (2003) and Some Like It Hot (2024).

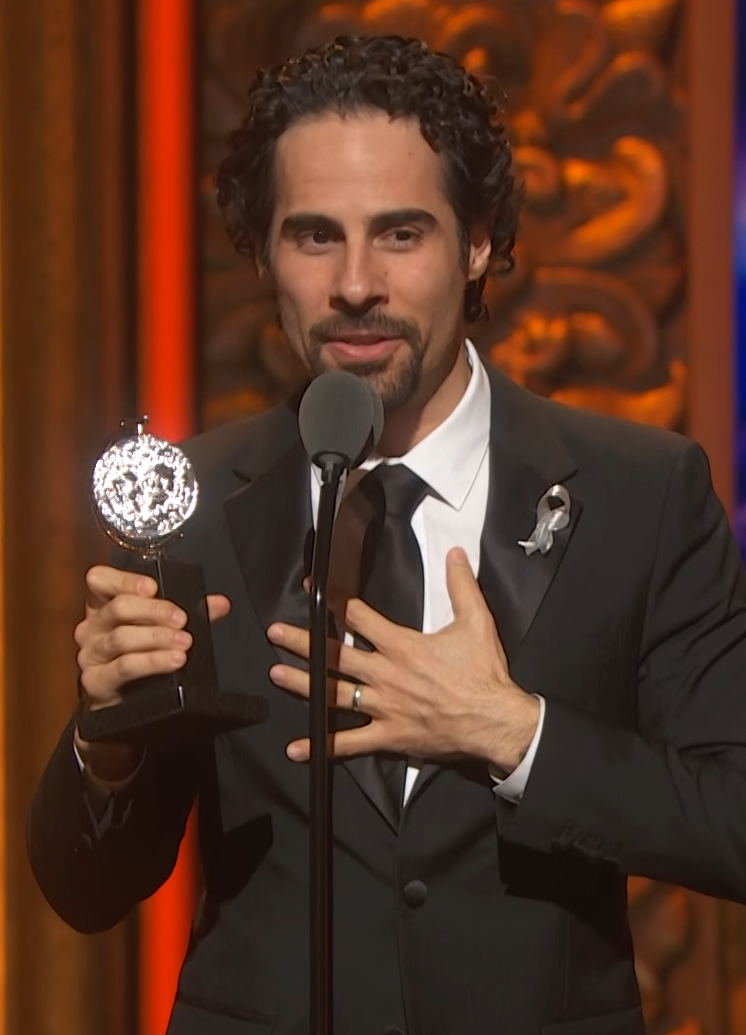
Alex Lacamoire won thrice for In the Heights (2009), Hamilton (2016) and Dear Evan Hansen (2018).

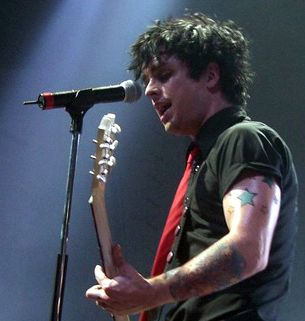
Billie Joe Armstrong won twice for American Idiot (2011).

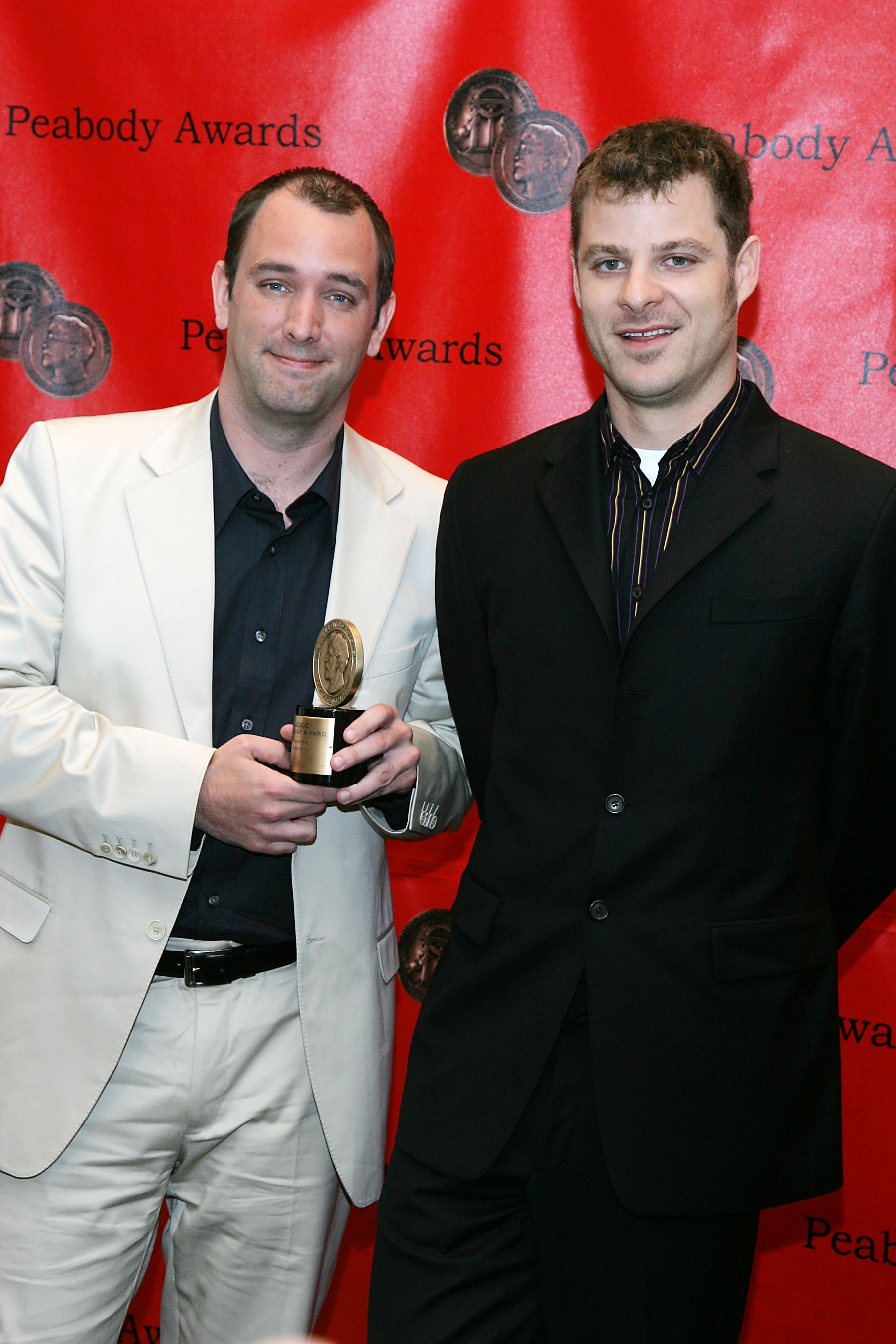
Trey Parker and Matt Stone won for The Book of Mormon (2012).

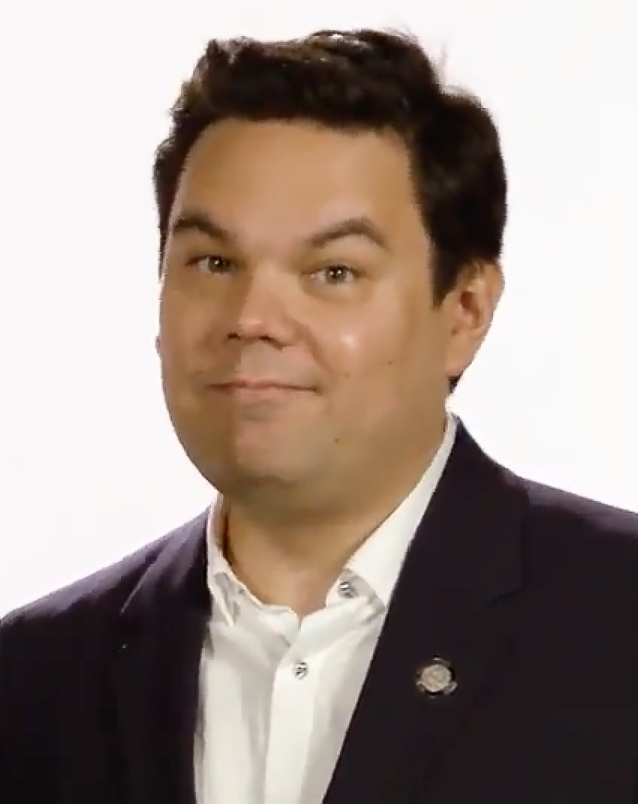
Robert Lopez won for The Book of Mormon (2012).

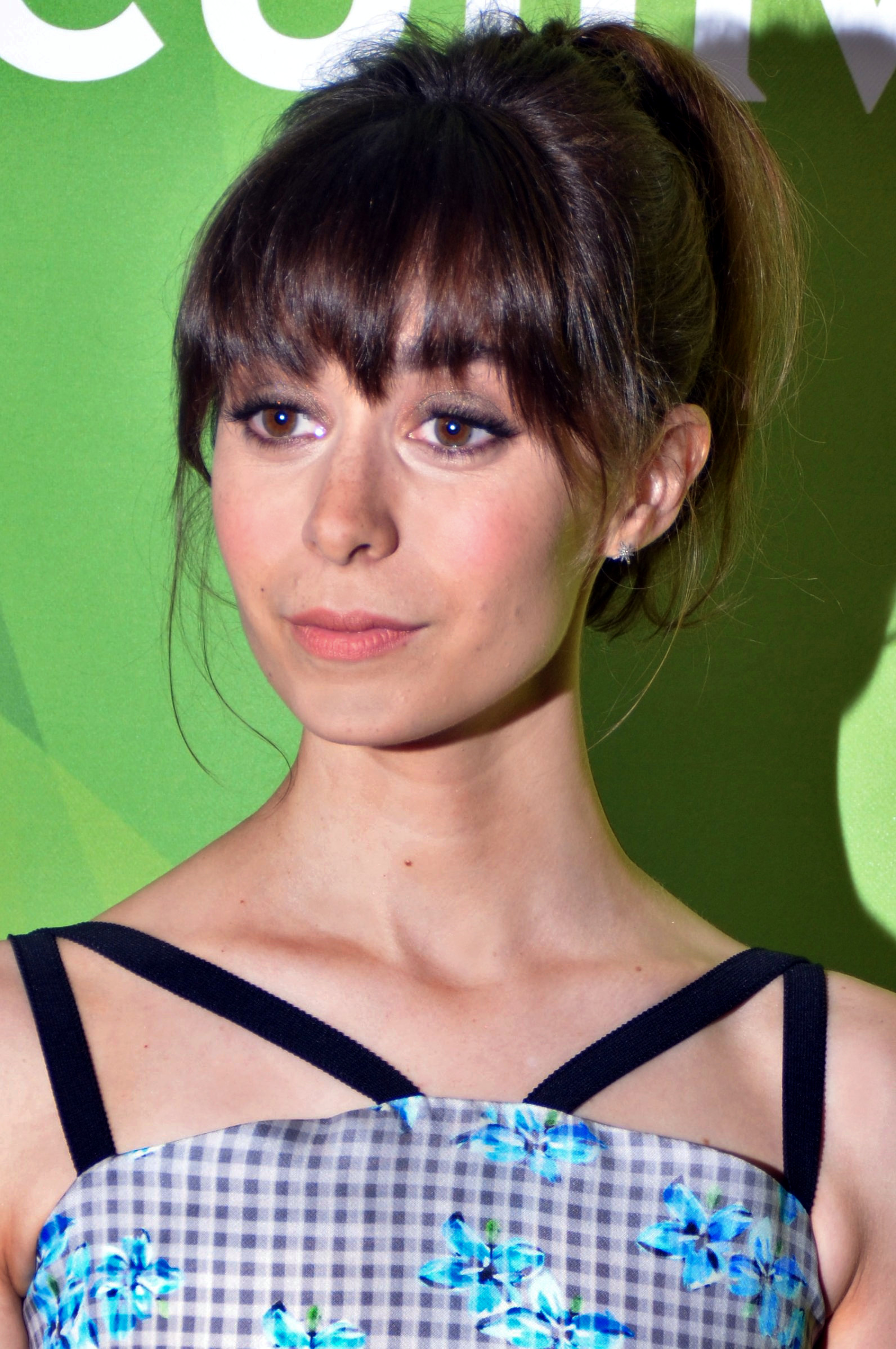
Cristin Milioti won as a vocalist for Once (2013).

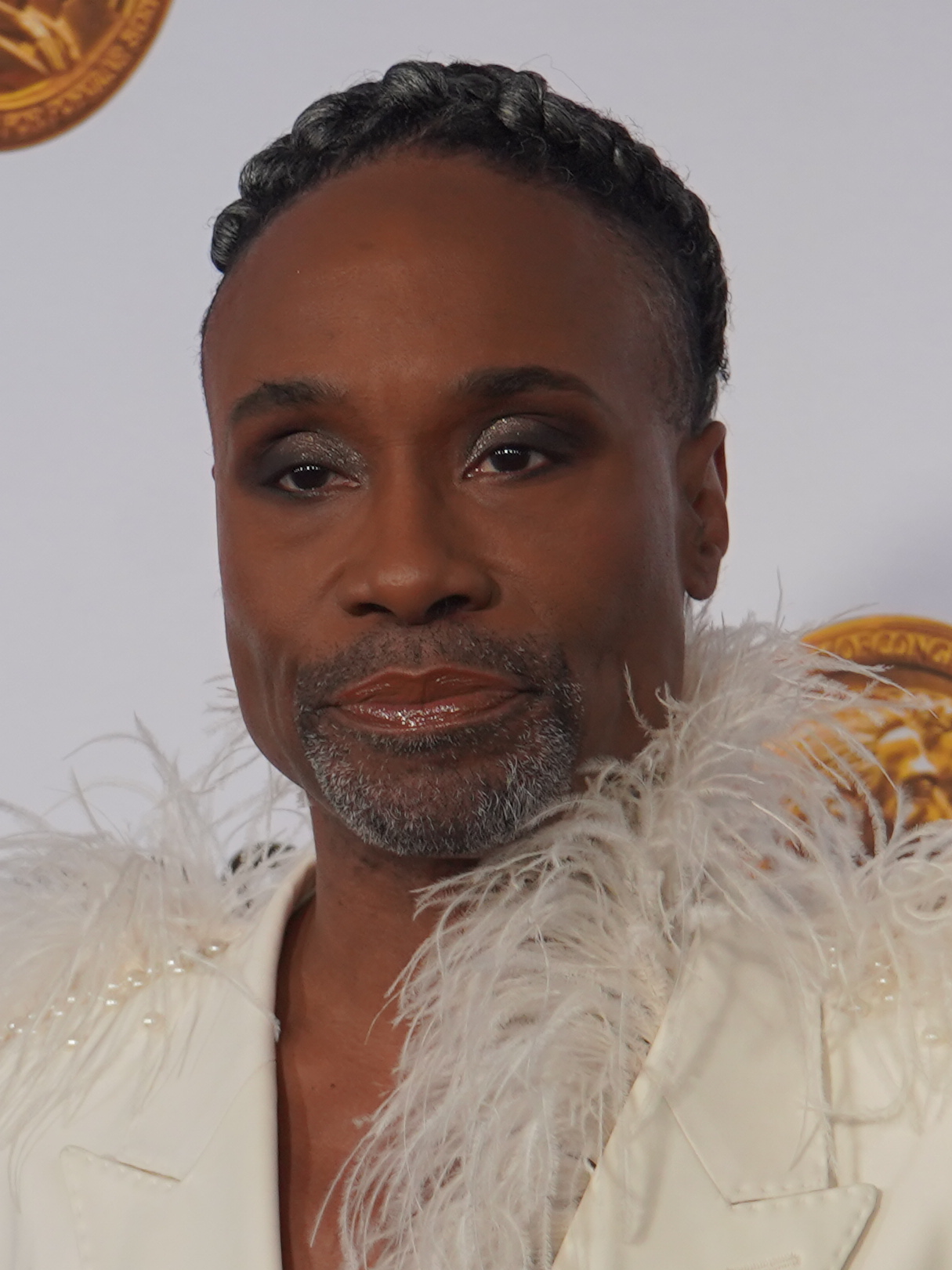
Billy Porter won as a vocalist for Kinky Boots (2014)

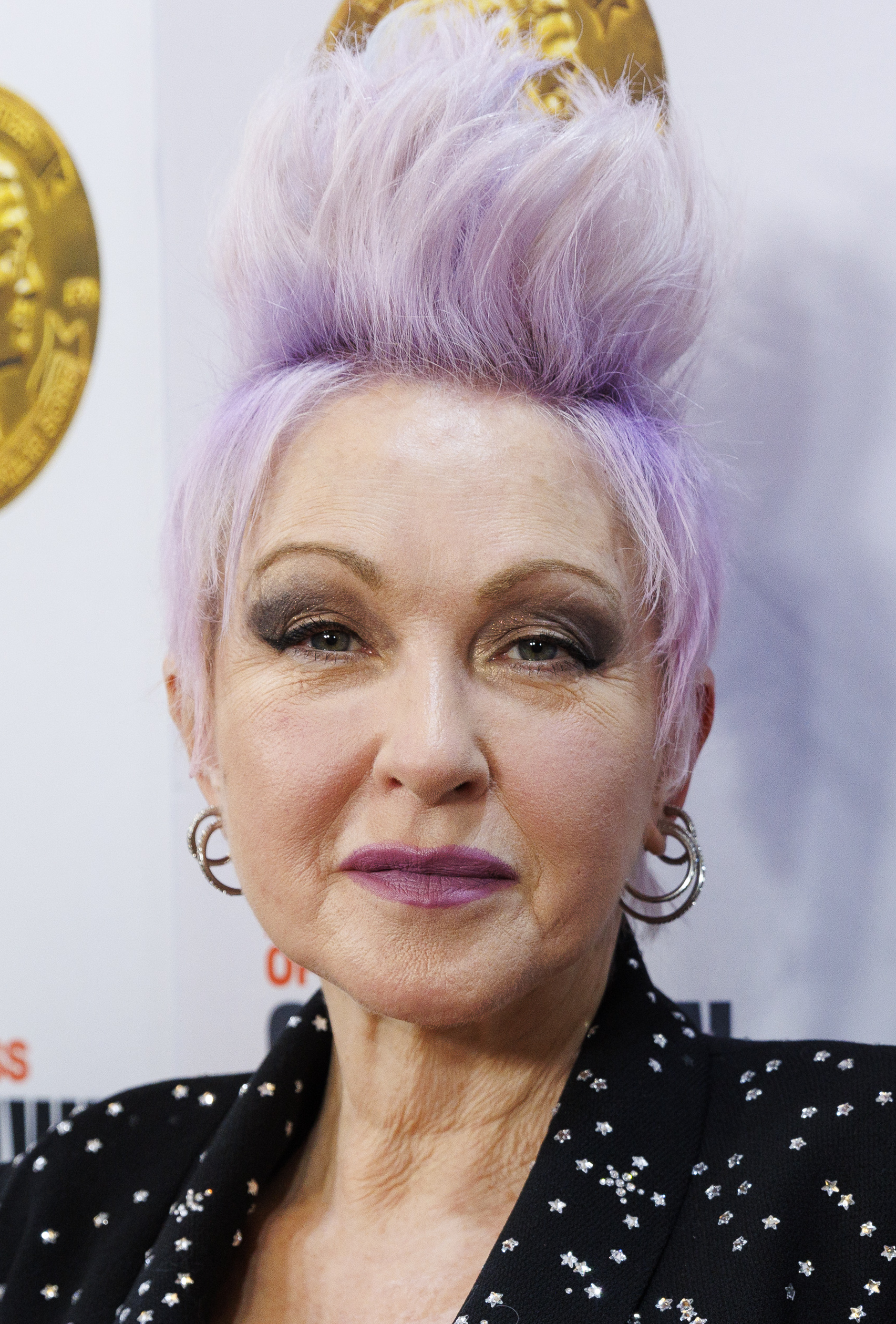
Cyndi Lauper (Note: Lauper won in 2014, and was nominated again in 2017, for her show Kinky Boots) won for her show Kinky Boots (2014).

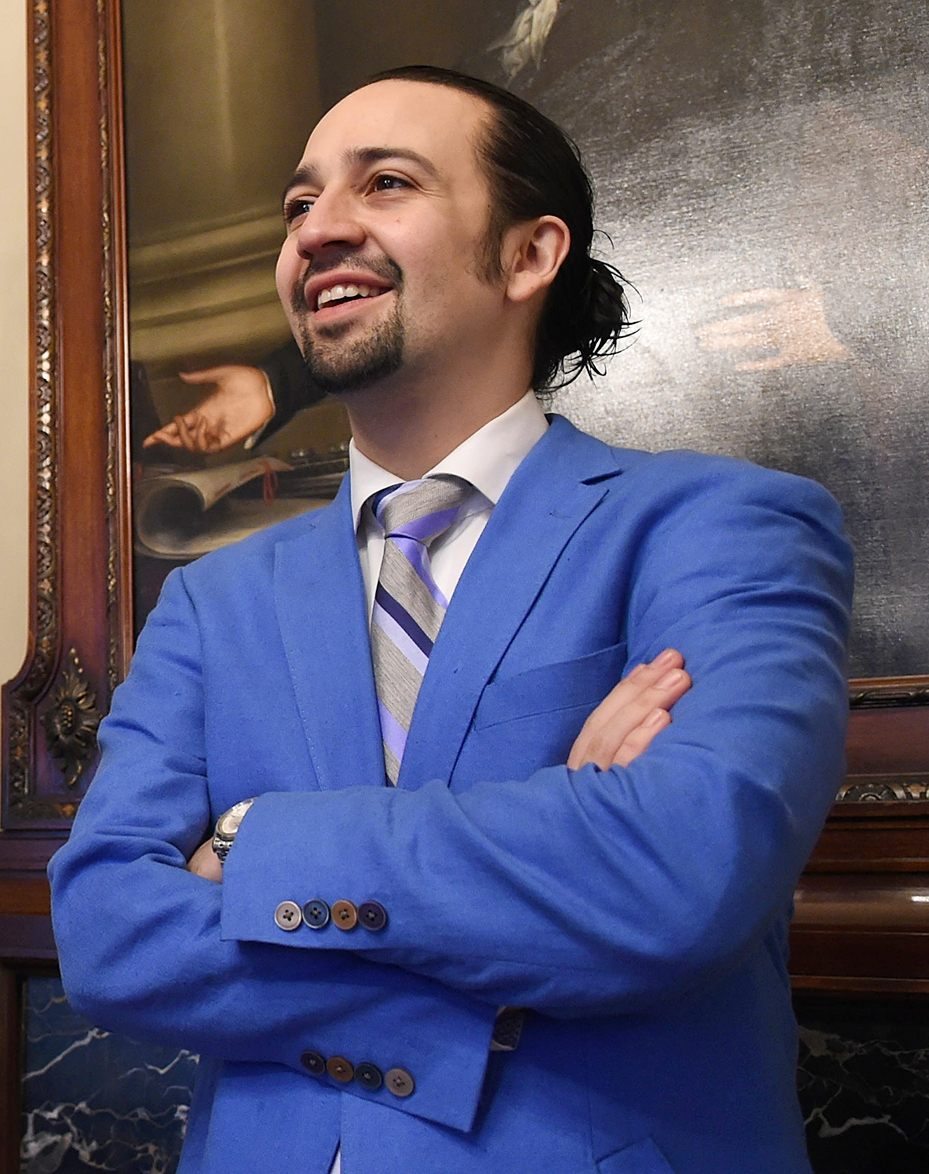
Lin-Manuel Miranda won twice for In the Heights (2010) and Hamilton (2016).

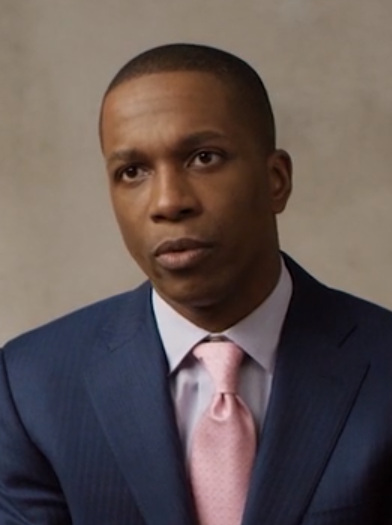
Leslie Odom Jr. won as a vocalist for Hamilton (2016).

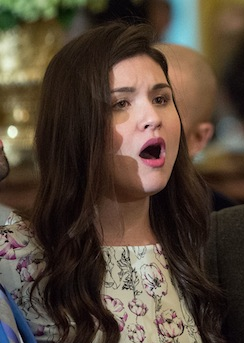
Phillipa Soo (Note: Soo is currently the only woman to win more than one award) won for Hamilton (2016), and Into the Woods (2023).

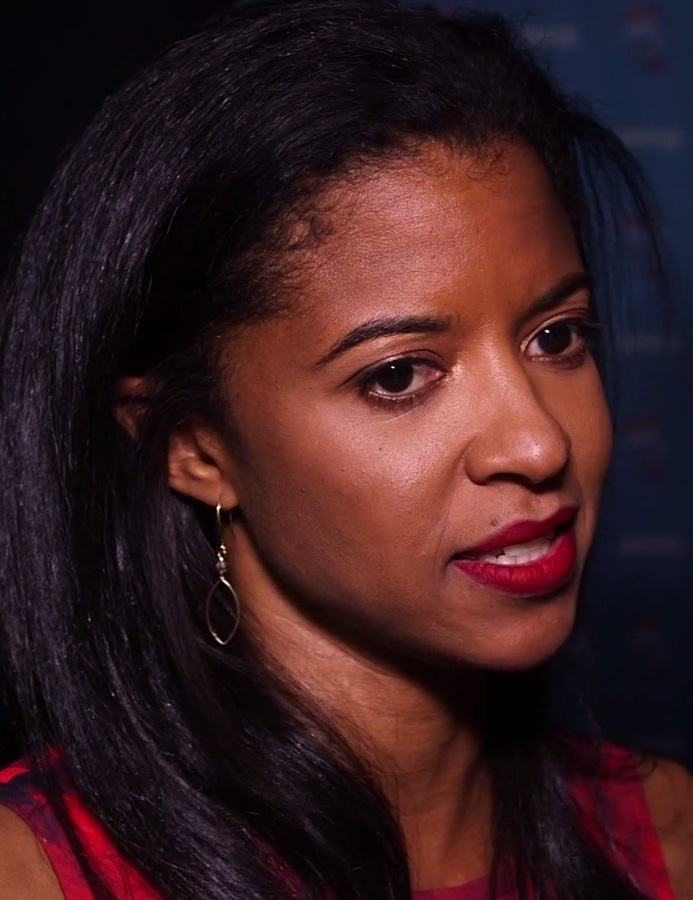
Renée Elise Goldsberry won as a vocalist for Hamilton (2016).

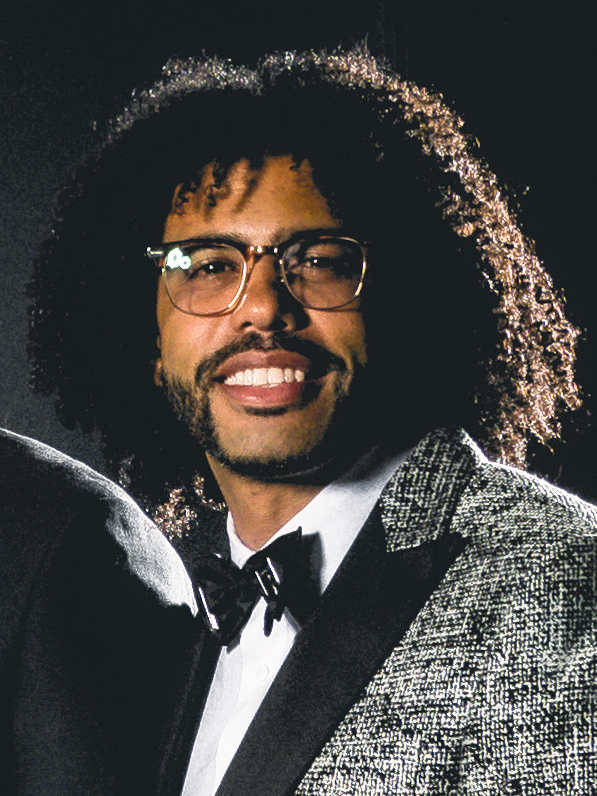
Daveed Diggs won as a vocalist for Hamilton (2016).

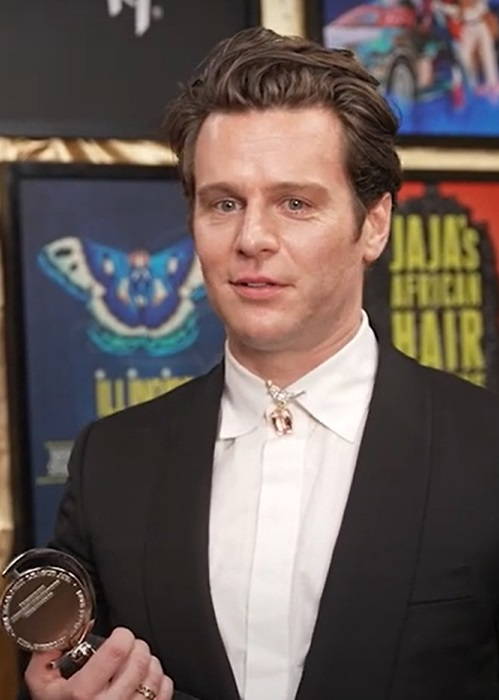
Jonathan Groff won as a vocalist for Hamilton (2016).

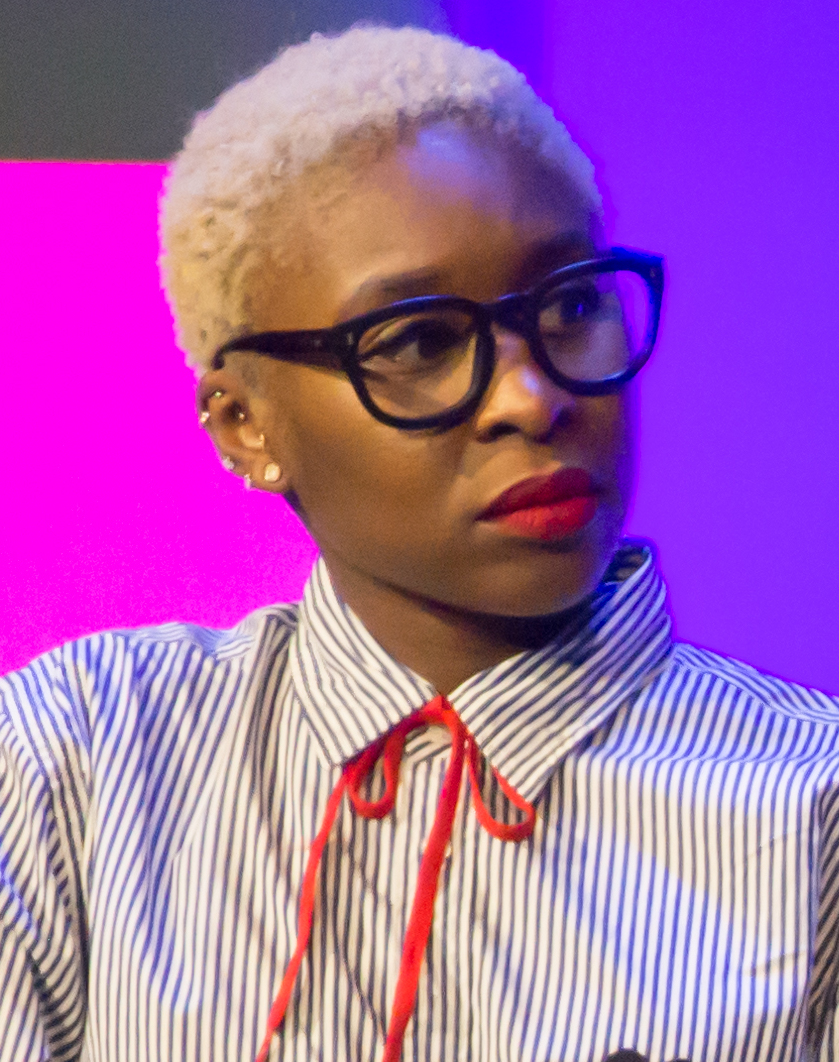
Cynthia Erivo won as a vocalist in The Color Purple (2017).

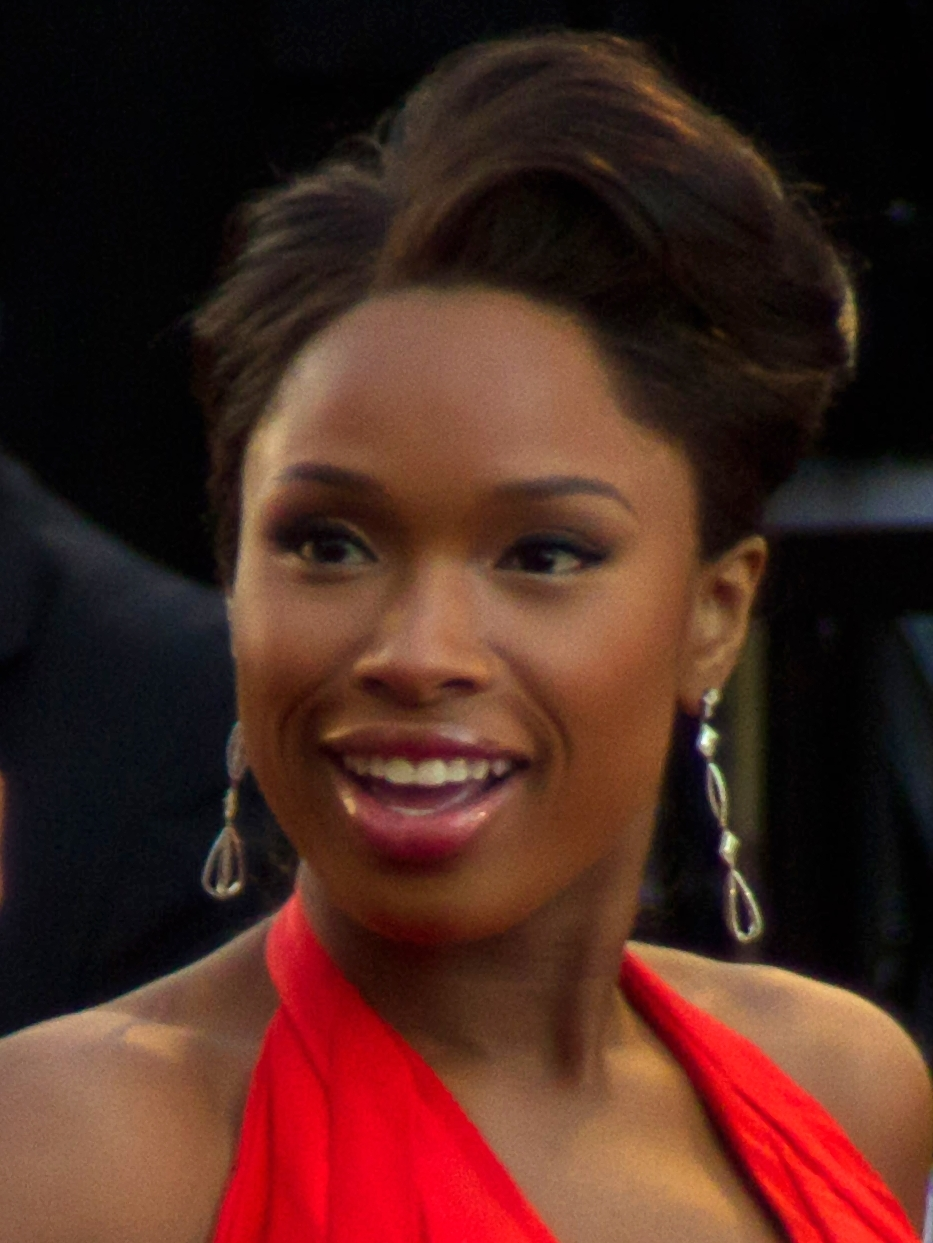
Jennifer Hudson won as a vocalist in The Color Purple (2017).

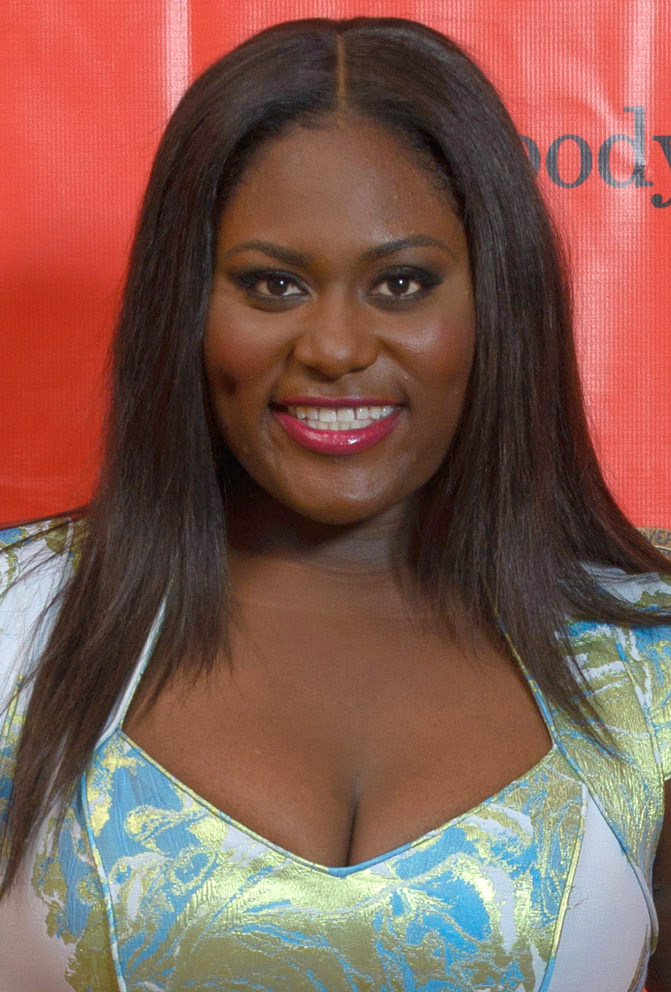
Danielle Brooks won as a vocalist for The Color Purple (2017).

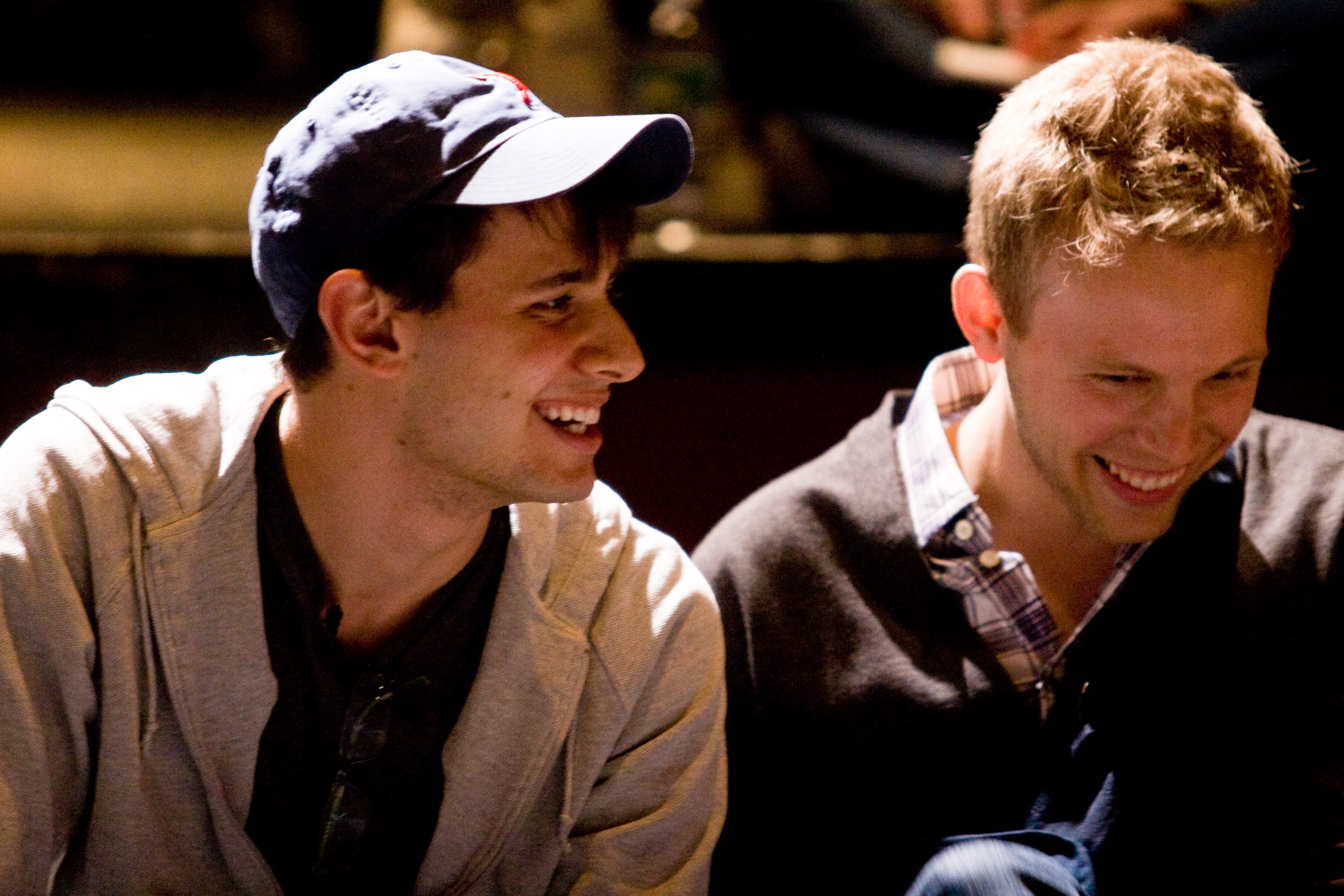
Benj Pasek & Justin Paul won for Dear Evan Hansen (2018)

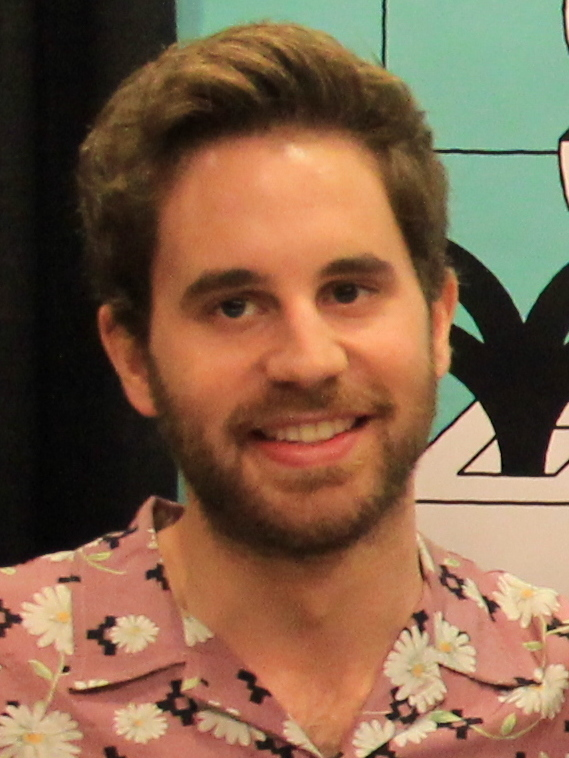
Ben Platt as a vocalist for Dear Evan Hansen (2018).

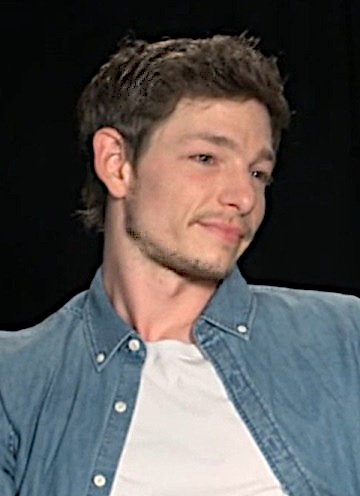
Mike Faist won as a vocalist for Dear Evan Hansen (2018).

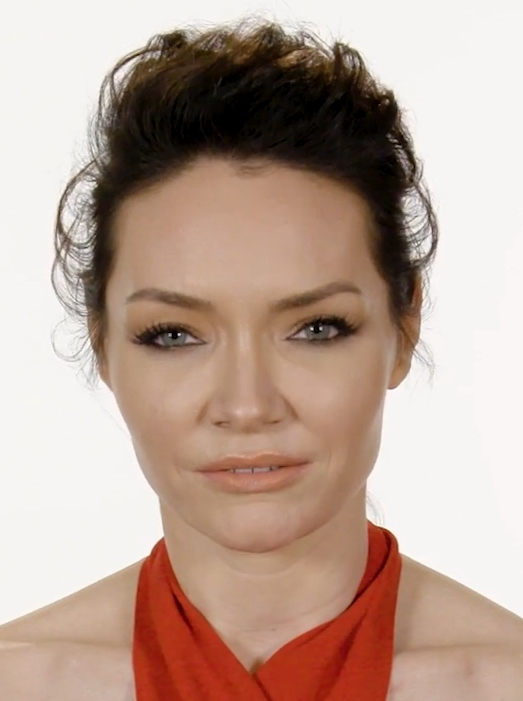
Katrina Lenk won as a vocalist for The Band's Visit (2019).

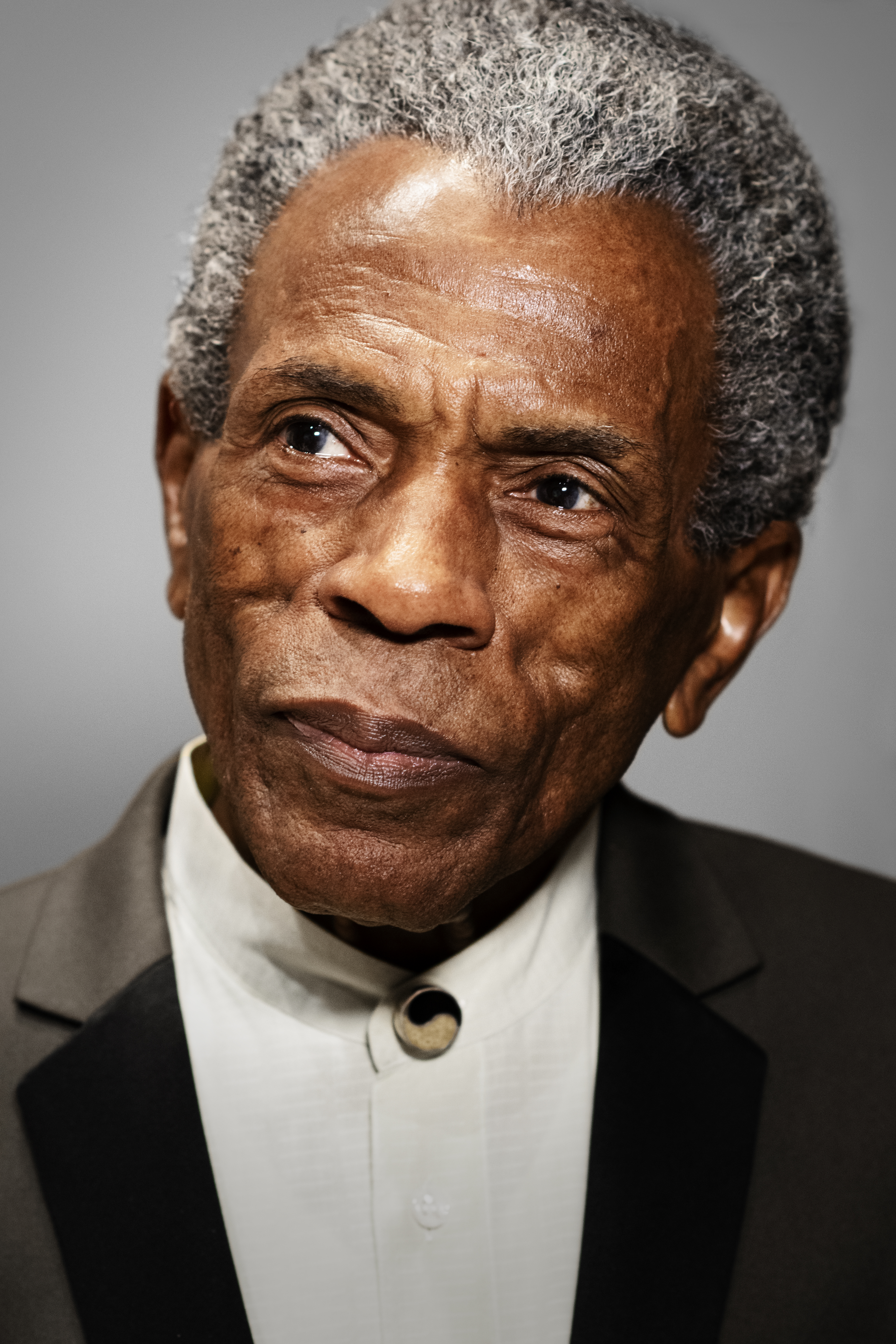
Andre DeShields won as a vocalist for Hadestown (2020).

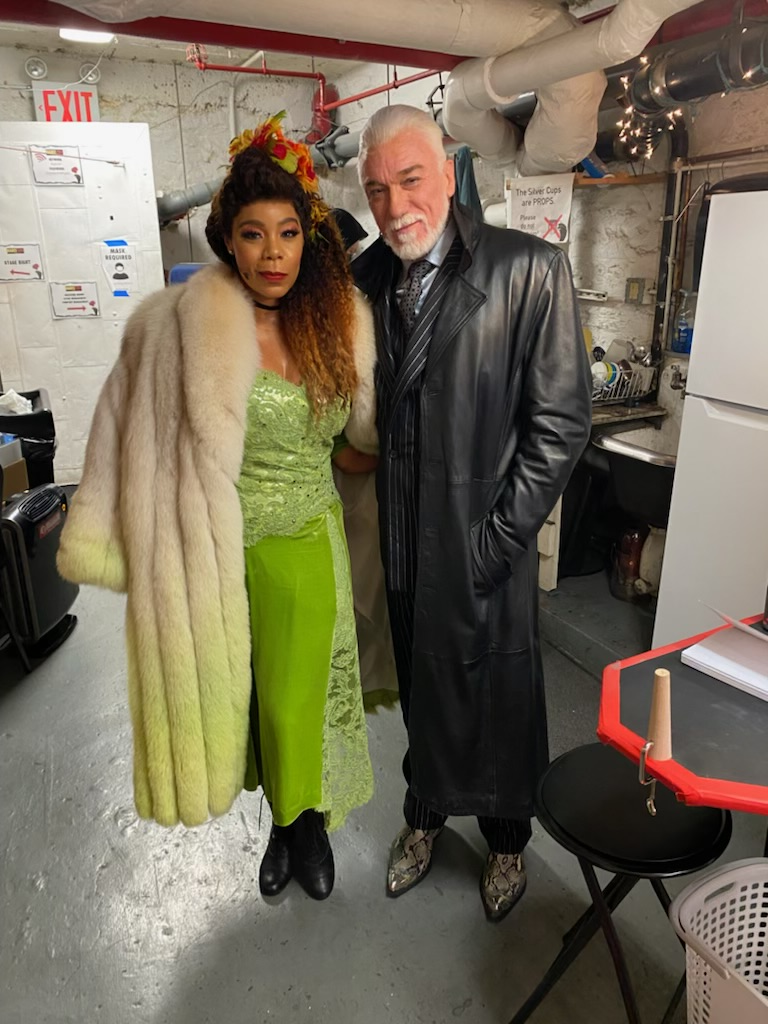
Amber Gray and Patrick Page won as vocalists for Hadestown (2020).

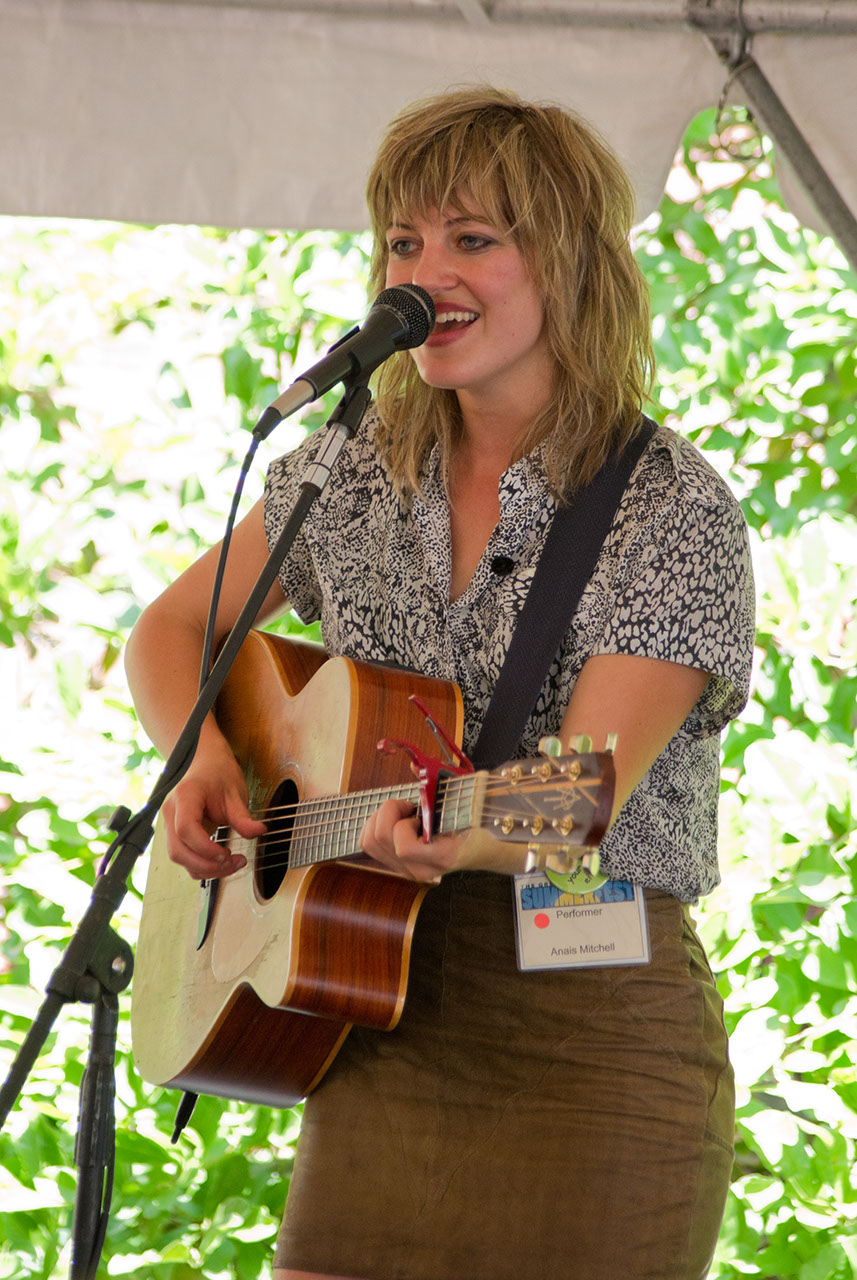
Anaïs Mitchell won in 2020 for her musical Hadestown.

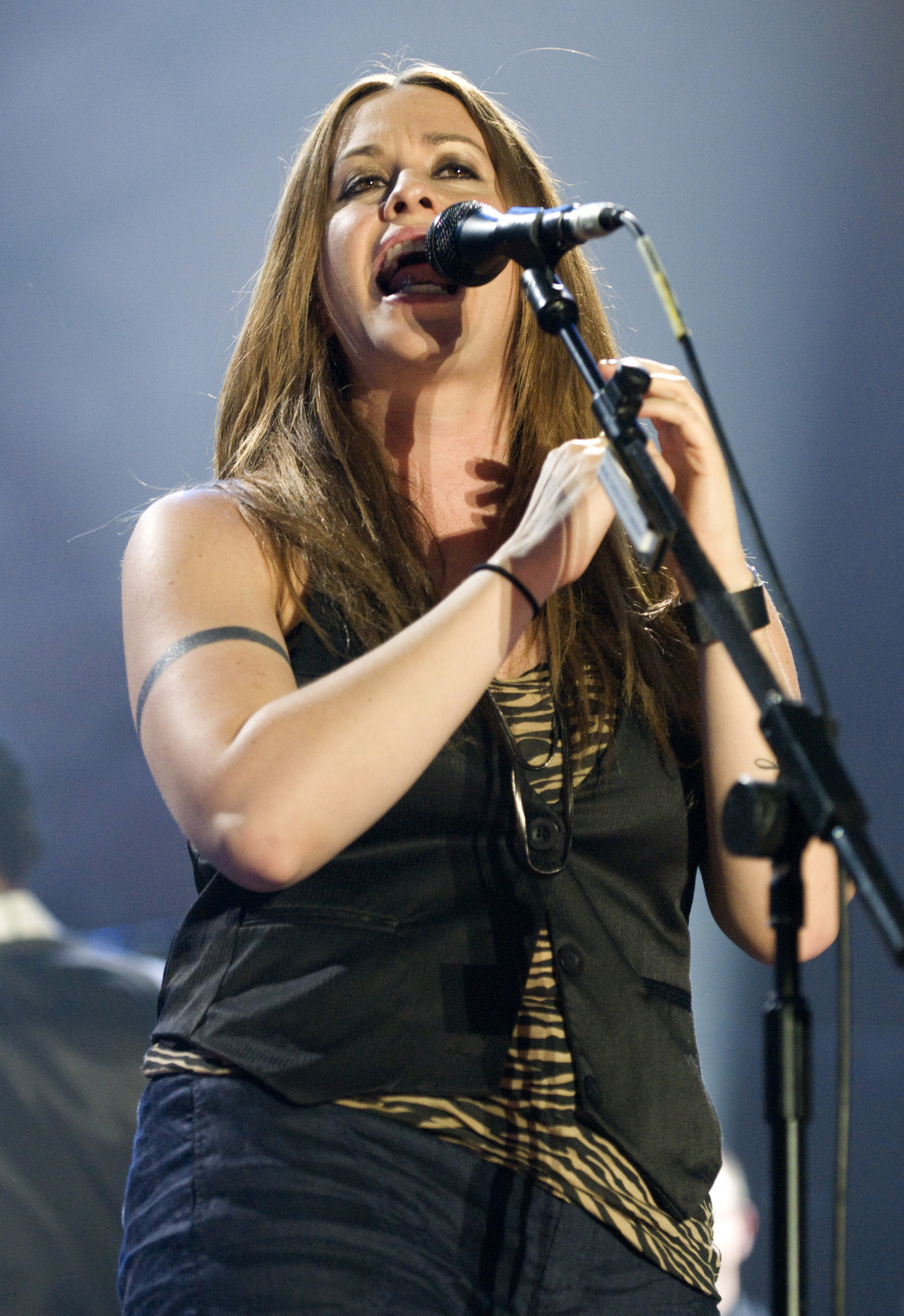
Alanis Morissette won for her musical Jagged Little Pill (2021).

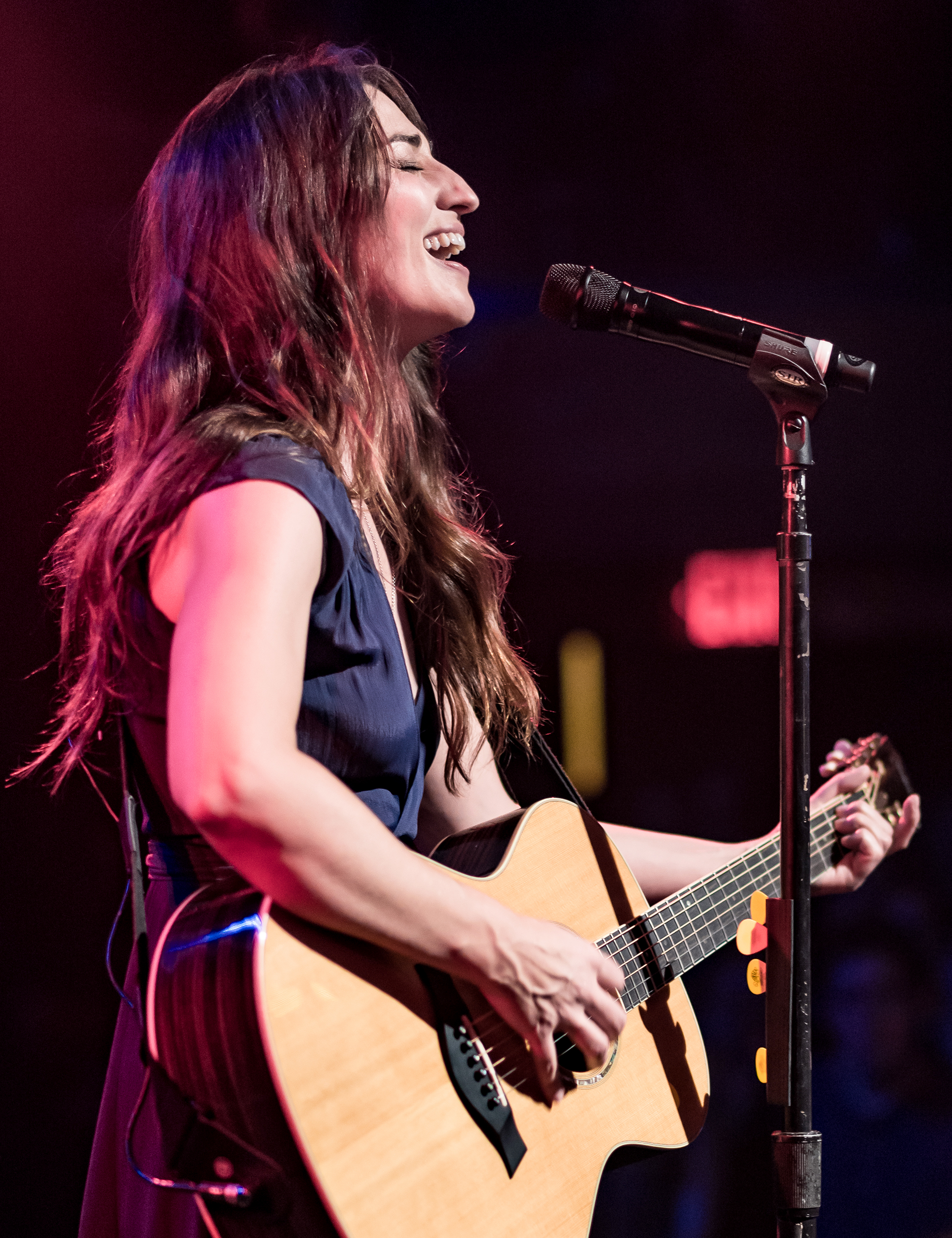
Sara Bareilles (Note: She was nominated as a lyricist in 2017 for Waitress) won as vocalist in Into the Woods (2023).

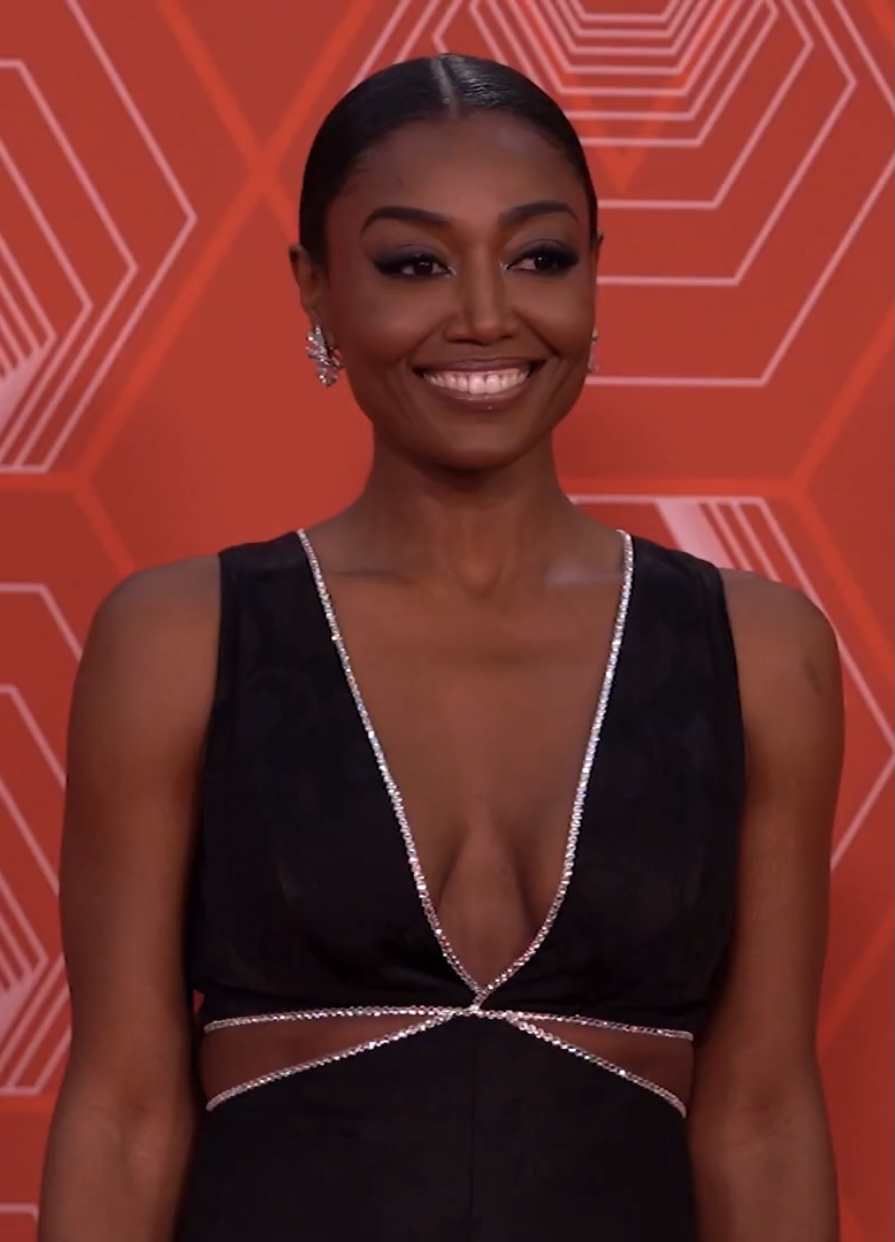
Patina Miller won as a vocalist for Into the Woods (2022).

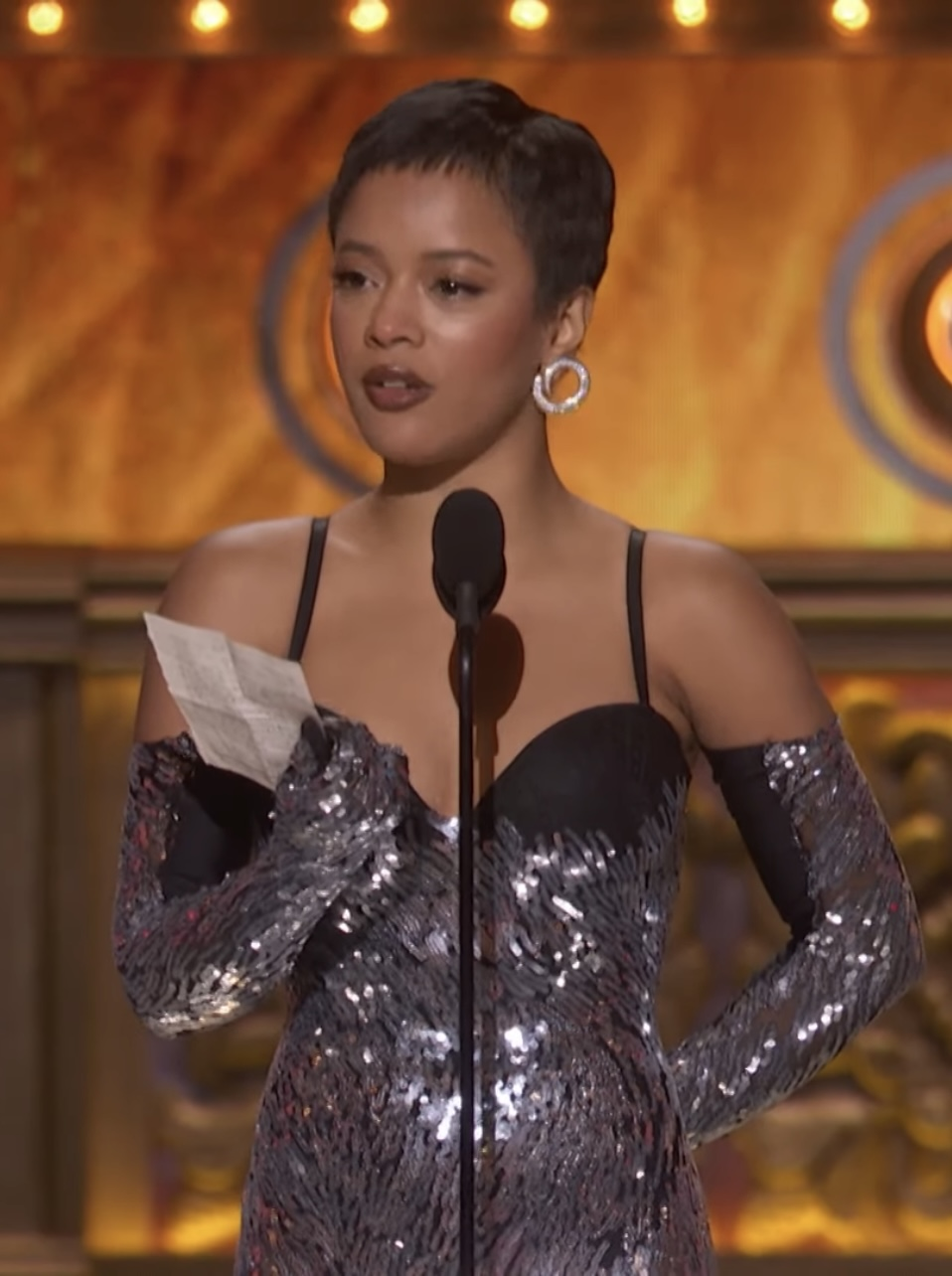
Maleah Joi Moon won as a vocalist for Hell's Kitchen (2025).

=== 1950s ===
Year (Note: Each year is linked to the article about the Grammy Awards held that year.)	Album	Recipient(s)	Artist(s)
1959	The Music Man	Meredith Willson, composer	Robert Preston, Barbara Cook, David Burns, Eddie Hodges, Pert Kelton and Helen Raymond
1959	Flower Drum Song	Richard Rodgers, composer	Original Broadway Cast
1959	Peter Gunn	Henry Mancini, composer	Henry Mancini
1959	Victory at Sea, Vol. II	Richard Rodgers, composer	Robert Russell Bennett

=== 1960s ===
Year	Album	Recipient(s)	Artist(s)
1960	Gypsy (TIE)	Ethel Merman	Ethel Merman and Broadway Show Cast
1960	Redhead (TIE)	Gwen Verdon	Gwen Verdon, Richard Kiley, Leonard Stone, Doris Rich, Cynthia Latham, Joy Nichols, Bob Dixon and Pat Ferrier
1960	Ages of Man	John Gielgud	John Gielgud
1960	Once Upon a Mattress	Hal Hastings	Original Broadway Cast conducted by Hal Hastings
1960	A Party with Betty Comden and Adolph Green	Betty Comden and Adolph Green	Betty Comden and Adolph Green
1961	The Sound of Music	Richard Rodgers and Oscar Hammerstein II, composers	Mary Martin and Original Broadway Cast
1961	Bye Bye Birdie	Charles Strouse and Lee Adams, composers	Chita Rivera, Dick Van Dyke and Paul Lynde
1961	Camelot	Alan Jay Lerner and Frederick Loewe, composers	Richard Burton, Julie Andrews and Robert Goulet
1961	Fiorello!	Jerry Bock and Sheldon Harnick, composers	Original Broadway Cast
1961	The Unsinkable Molly Brown	Meredith Willson, composer	Original Broadway Cast
1962	How to Succeed in Business Without Really Trying	Frank Loesser, composer	Robert Morse, Rudy Vallée, Charles Nelson Reilly, Bonnie Scott, Claudette Southerland and Sammy Smith
1962	Carnival!	Bob Merrill, composer	Original Cast
1962	Do Re Mi	Jule Styne, Betty Comden and Adolph Green, composers	Original Cast
1962	Milk and Honey	Jerry Herman, composer	Original Cast
1962	Wildcat	Cy Coleman and Carolyn Leigh, composers	Original Cast
1963	No Strings	Richard Rodgers, composer	Richard Kiley, Diahann Carroll, Bernice Mass, Noelle Adam, Don Chastain, Mitchell Gregg and Noëlle Adam
1963	Beyond the Fringe	Dudley Moore, composer	Dudley Moore, Alan Bennett, Peter Cook and Jonathan Miller
1963	A Funny Thing Happened on the Way to the Forum	Stephen Sondheim, composer	Original Broadway Cast
1963	Oliver!	Lionel Bart, composer	Original Broadway Cast
1963	Stop the World, I Want to Get Off	Leslie Bricusse and Anthony Newley, composers	Anthony Newley, Anna Quayle and Original Cast
1964	She Loves Me	Jerry Bock and Sheldon Harnick, composers	Barbara Cook, Barbara Baxley, Jack Cassidy, Daniel Massey, Nathaniel Frey, Ralph Williams and Jo Wilder
1964	110 in the Shade	Meredith Willson, composer	Various Artists
1964	Here's Love	Harvey Schmidt and Tom Jones, composers	Various Artists
1964	Jennie	Arthur Schwartz and Howard Dietz, composers	Various Artists
1964	Tovarich	Lee Pockriss and Anne Croswell, composers	Various Artists
1965	Funny Girl	Jule Styne and Bob Merrill, composers	Barbra Streisand, Sydney Chaplin, Danny Meehan, Kay Medford, Jean Stapleton and John Lankston
1965	Fiddler on the Roof	Jerry Bock and Sheldon Harnick, composers	Original Broadway Cast (Zero Mostel and Bea Arthur)
1965	Hello, Dolly!	Jerry Herman, composer	Carol Channing and Original Cast
1965	High Spirits	Hugh Martin and Timothy Gray, composers	Original Cast
1965	What Makes Sammy Run?	Ervin Drake, composer	Original Cast
1966	On a Clear Day You Can See Forever	Burton Lane and Alan Jay Lerner, composers	Barbara Harris, John Cullum, Titos Vandis, Byron Webster and William Daniels
1966	Bajour	Walter Marks, composer	Original Cast
1966	Baker Street	Marian Grudeff and Raymond Jessell, composers	Original Cast
1966	Do I Hear a Waltz?	Richard Rodgers and Stephen Sondheim, composers	Original Cast
1966	Half a Sixpence	David Heneker, composer	Original Cast
1967	Mame	Jerry Herman, composer	Angela Lansbury, Bea Arthur, Jane Connell, Charles Braswell, Jerry Lanning and Frankie Michaels
1967	The Apple Tree	Jerry Bock and Sheldon Harnick, composers	Original Cast
1967	Man of La Mancha	Mitch Leigh and Joe Darion, composers	Original Cast
1967	Skyscraper	Jimmy Van Heusen and Sammy Cahn, composers	Original Cast
1967	Sweet Charity	Cy Coleman and Dorothy Fields, composers	Original Cast
1968	Cabaret	John Kander and Fred Ebb, composers; Goddard Lieberson, producer	Joel Grey, Lotte Lenya, Jill Haworth, Jack Gilford and Bert Convy
1968	Hallelujah, Baby!	Jule Styne, Betty Comden and Adolph Green, composers; Edward Kleban, producer	Various Artists
1968	I Do! I Do!	Harvey Schmidt and Tom Jones, composers; Andy Wiswell, producer	Mary Martin and Robert Preston
1968	Walking Happy	Sammy Cahn a d Jimmy Van Heusen, composers; Richard C. Jones, producer	Various Artists
1968	You're a Good Man, Charlie Brown	Clark Gesner, composer; Herb Galewitz and Bob Morgan, producers	Various Artists
1969	Hair	Galt MacDermot, James Rado and Gerome Ragni, composers; Andy Wiswell, producer	Ronnie Dyson, Gerome Ragni, Steve Curry, Lamont Washington, Diane Keaton, Melba Moore and James Rado
1969	George M!	George M. Cohan, composer; Thomas Z. Shepard, producer	Joel Grey, Betty Ann Grove, Jill O'Hara, Bernadette Peters, Loni Ackerman, Jerry Dodge and Danny Carroll
1969	The Happy Time	John Kander and Fred Ebb, composers; George Marek Jr. and Andy Wiswell, producers	Robert Goulet, David Wayne, Michael Rupert and Julie Gregg
1969	Jacques Brel Is Alive and Well and Living in Paris	Jacques Brel, composer; Edward Kleban, producer	Elly Stone, Mort Shuman, Shawn Elliot and Alice Wakefield
1969	Your Own Thing	Hal Hester and Danny Apolinar, composers; George Marek Jr. and Andy Wiswell, producers	Danny Apolinar, Tom Ligon, John Kuhner, Marcia Rodd, etc.

=== 1970s ===
Year	Album	Recipient(s)	Artist(s)
1970	Promises, Promises	Burt Bacharach and Hal David, composers; Henry Jerome and Phil Ramone, producers	Jerry Orbach, Jill O'Hara, Edward Winter, Donna McKechnie, A. L. Haines, Marian Mercer and Paul Reed
1970	1776	Sherman Edwards, composer; Thomas Z. Shepard, producer	Original Cast
1970	Dames at Sea	George Haimsohn, Rubin Miller and Jim J. Wise, composers; Thomas Z. Shepard, producer	Bernadette Peters, David Christmas, Steve Elmore, Tamara Long and Sally Stark
1970	Oh! Calcutta!	Robert Dennis, Stanley Walden and Peter Schickele, composers; Henry Jerome, producer	Peter Schickele, Stanley Walden, Robert Dennis, Boni Enten, Katie Wilkinson and Mark Dempsey
1970	Zorba	John Kander and Fred Ebb, composers; Richard C. Jones, producer	Herschel Bernardi, Maria Karnilova, John Cunningham, Carmen Alvarez, Lorraine Serrabian and Jerry Sappir
1971	Company	Stephen Sondheim, composer; Thomas Z. Shepard, producer	Dean Jones, Barbara Barrie, George Coe, Teri Ralston, John Cunningham and Beth Howland
1971	Applause	Charles Strouse and Lee Adams, composers; Robert Arnold, producer	Various Artists
1971	Coco	Alan Jay Lerner and André Previn, composers; Andy Wiswell, producer	Various Artists
1971	Joy	Oscar Brown Jr., Jean Pace and Sivuca, composers; Ernie Altschuler, producer	Various Artists
1971	Purlie	Gary Geld and Peter Udell, composers; Andy Wiswell, producer	Various Artists
1972	Godspell	Stephen Schwartz, composer/producer	Original Cast
1972	Follies	Stephen Sondheim, composer; Richard C. Jones, producer	Various Artists
1972	The Rothschilds	Jerry Bock and Sheldon Harnick, composers; Thomas Z. Shepard, producer	Various Artists
1972	Touch	Kenn Long and Jim Crozier, composers; Glenn Osser, producer	Various Artists
1972	Two by Two	Richard Rodgers and Martin Charnin, composers; Thomas Z. Shepard, producer	Various Artists
1973	Don't Bother Me, I Can't Cope	Micki Grant, composer; Jerry Ragavoy, producer	Alex Bradford, Hope Clarke and Bobby Hill
1973	Ain't Supposed to Die a Natural Death	Melvin Van Peebles, composer/producer	Arthur French, Gloria Edwards and Ralph Wilcox
1973	Grease	Warren Casey and Jim Jacobs, composers; Arnold Maxin, producer	Barry Bostwick, Adrienne Barbeau and Walter Bobbie
1973	Sugar	Jule Styne and Bob Merrill, composers; Mitch Miller, producer	Robert Morse, Tony Roberts, Cyril Ritchard, Elaine Joyce and Sheila Smith
1973	Two Gentlemen of Verona	John Guare and Galt MacDermot, composers; Galt MacDermot, Harold Wheeler and Lee Young, producers	Jonelle Allen, Diana Davila, Clifton Davis, Raul Julia and Norman Matlock
1974	A Little Night Music	Stephen Sondheim, composer; Goddard Lieberson, producer	Glynis Johns, Len Cariou, Hermione Gingold, Victoria Mallory, Patricia Elliott and Teri Ralston
1974	Cyrano	Anthony Burgess and Michael J. Lewis, composers; Jerry Moss and Phil Ramone, producers	Various Artists
1974	The Man from the East	Stomu Yamashita, composer/producer	Various Artists
1974	Pippin	Stephen Schwartz, composer; Phil Ramone and Stephen Schwartz, producers	Various Artists
1974	Seesaw	Cy Coleman and Dorothy Fields, composers; Cy Coleman, producer	Various Artists
1975	Raisin	Judd Woldin and Robert Brittan, composers; Thomas Z. Shepard, producer	Virginia Capers, Joe Morton, Ernestine Jackson, Robert Jackson, Debbie Allen and Helen Martin
1975	Let My People Come	Earl Wilson Jr. and Phil Oesterman, composers; Henry Jerome, producer	Various Artists
1975	The Magic Show	Stephen Schwartz, composer; Phil Ramone and Stephen Schwartz, producers	Various Artists
1975	Over Here!	Richard M. Sherman and Robert B. Sherman, composers; Charles Koppelman and Teo Macero, producers	Various Artists
1975	The Rocky Horror Show	Richard O'Brien, composer; Lou Adler, producer	Various Artists
1976	The Wiz	Charlie Smalls, composer; Jerry Wexler, producer	Stephanie Mills and Dee Dee Bridgewater
1976	Chicago	John Kander and Fred Ebb, composers; Phil Ramone, producer	Various Artists
1976	A Chorus Line	Marvin Hamlisch and Edward Kleban, composers; Goddard Lieberson, producer	Various Artists
1976	A Little Night Music	Stephen Sondheim, composer; Thomas Z. Shepard, producer	Various Artists
1976	Shenandoah	Gary Geld and Peter Udell, composers; Gary Geld, Philip Rose and Peter Udell, producers	Various Artists
1977	Bubbling Brown Sugar	Luigi Creatore and Hugo Peretti, producers	Original Broadway Cast
1977	My Fair Lady — 20th Anniversary Production	Alan Jay Lerner and Frederick Loewe, composers; Goddard Lieberson, producer	Original Cast — 20th Anniversary Production
1977	Pacific Overtures	Stephen Sondheim, composer; Thomas Z. Shepard, producer	Original Cast
1977	Rex	Richard Rodgers and Sheldon Harnick, composers; Thomas Z. Shepard, producer	Original Cast
1977	Side by Side by Sondheim	Thomas Z. Shepard, producer	Millicent Martin, Julia McKenzie and David Kernan
1978	Annie	Charles Strouse and Martin Charnin, composers; Larry Morton and Charles Strouse, producers	Andrea McArdle and Dorothy Loudon
1978	Guys and Dolls	William Goldstein, producer	Various Artists
1978	I Love My Wife	Cy Coleman and Michael Stewart, composers; Cy Coleman, producer	Original Cast
1978	Starting Here, Starting Now	Richard Maltby Jr. and David Shire, composers; Jay David Saks, producer	Loni Ackerman, George Lee Andrews and Margery Cohen
1978	Your Arms Too Short to Box with God	Micki Grant and Alex Bradford, composers; Esmond Edwards, producer	Various Artists
1979	Ain't Misbehavin'	Thomas Z. Shepard, producer	Various Artists
1979	Beatlemania — Original Cast	Kenny Laguna and Sandy Yaguda, producers	Various Artists
1979	The Best Little Whorehouse in Texas	Carol Hall, composer; John Simon, producer	Various Artists
1979	The King and I	Thomas Z. Shepard, producer	Yul Brynner and Constance Towers
1979	On the Twentieth Century	Cy Coleman, Betty Comden and Adolph Green, composers; Cy Coleman, producer	Kevin Kline, Madeline Kahn, John Cullum and Imogene Coca

=== 1980s ===
Year	Album	Recipient(s)	Artist(s)
1980	Sweeney Todd: The Demon Barber of Fleet Street	Stephen Sondheim, composer/lyricist; Thomas Z. Shepard, producer	Angela Lansbury and Len Cariou
1980	Ballroom	Alan Bergman and Billy Goldenberg, composers; Marilyn Bergman, lyricist; Larry Morton, producer	Various Artists
1980	The Grand Tour	Jerry Herman, composer/lyricist; Mike Berniker and Jerry Herman, producers	Various Artists
1980	I'm Getting My Act Together and Taking It on the Road	Gretchen Cryer and Nancy Ford, composers; Edward Kleban, producer	Various Artists
1980	They're Playing Our Song	Marvin Hamlisch, composer; Carole Bayer Sager, lyricist; Brooks Arthur and Marvin Hamlisch, producers	Robert Klein, Lucy Arnaz and Various Artists
1981	Evita: Premiere American Recording	Andrew Lloyd Webber, composer/producer; Tim Rice, lyricist/producer	Various Artists
1981	Barnum	Michael Stewart, composer; Mike Berniker, producer	Various Artists
1981	A Day in Hollywood / A Night in the Ukraine	Frank Lazarus and Trevor Lyttleton, composers; Dick Vosburgh, lyricist; Hugh Fordin, producer	Various Artists
1981	Oklahoma!	Thomas Z. Shepard, producer	Various Artists
1981	One Mo' Time	Carl Seltzer and Jerry Wexler, producers	Various Artists
1982	Lena Horne: The Lady and Her Music, Live on Broadway	Quincy Jones, producer	Lena Horne
1982	42nd Street	Thomas Z. Shepard, producer	Original Cast
1982	Duke Ellington's Sophisticated Ladies	Thomas Z. Shepard, producer	Cast
1982	The Pirates of Penzance	Peter Asher, producer	Kevin Kline, Linda Ronstadt and Rex Smith
1982	Woman of the Year	John Kander, composer; Fred Ebb, lyricist; John McClure, producer	Original Cast
1983	Dreamgirls: Original Broadway Cast Album	Henry Krieger, composer; Tom Eyen, lyricist; David Foster, producer	Various Artists
1983	Cats	Andrew Lloyd Webber, Trevor Nunn and Richard Stilgoe, composers; Andrew Lloyd Webber, producer	London Cast
1983	Joseph and the Amazing Technicolor Dreamcoat	Andrew Lloyd Webber, composer; Tim Rice, lyricist; Tim Rice and Roger Watson, producers	Original Cast
1983	Merrily We Roll Along	Stephen Sondheim, composer/lyricist; Thomas Z. Shepard, producer	Various Artists
1983	Nine	Mike Berniker, producer	Various Artists
1984	Cats: Complete Original Broadway Cast Recording	Andrew Lloyd Webber, producer	Original Broadway Cast
1984	La Cage aux Folles	Jerry Herman, composer/lyricist; Thomas Z. Shepard, producer	Original Cast (George Hearn and Gene Barry)
1984	Little Shop of Horrors	Alan Menken, composer; Howard Ashman, lyricist; Phil Ramone, producer	Broadway Cast
1984	On Your Toes	Norman Newell, producer	Various Artists
1984	Zorba	Thomas Z. Shepard, producer	Anthony Quinn
1985	Sunday in the Park with George	Stephen Sondheim, composer/lyricist; Thomas Z. Shepard, producer	Original Cast including Bernadette Peters, Mandy Patinkin and others
1985	Doonesbury	Elizabeth Swados, composer; Gary Trudeau, lyricist; Robert Liftin, producer	Original Cast
1985	My One and Only	Ahmet Ertegun and Wally Harper, producers	Various Artists
1985	A Stephen Sondheim Evening	Thomas Z. Shepard, producer	Various Artists including Angela Lansbury, Judy Kaye, George Hearn and others
1985	Sugar Babies	Harold Adamson, Dorothy Fields, Arthur Malvin, Jimmy McHugh and George Oppenheim, composers; Robert Sher, producer	Mickey Rooney and Ann Miller
1986	West Side Story	John McClure, producer	Kiri Te Kanawa and José Carreras
1986	Big River: The Adventures of Huckleberry Finn	Roger Miller, composer/lyricist; Jimmy Bowen, producer	Original Cast
1986	Greatest Hits from Leader of the Pack	Bob Crewe and Ellie Greenwich, producers	Leader of the Pack
1986	The Tap Dance Kid	Henry Krieger, composer; Robert Lorick, lyricist; Martin Silvestri, producer	Original Cast
1986	Very Warm for May	David Gooch, producer	Various Artists
1987	Follies in Concert	Thomas Z. Shepard, producer	Original 1986 Cast
1987	Me and My Girl (Original Cast Album)	Norman Newell, producer	Original Cast
1987	The Mystery of Edwin Drood (Original Broadway Cast Recording)	Rupert Holmes, composer	Original Broadway Cast
1987	Song and Dance	Don Black and Richard Maltby Jr., composers; Thomas Z. Shepard, producer	Bernadette Peters and Broadway Cast
1987	Sweet Charity (Original Broadway Cast)	Mike Berniker and Cy Coleman, producers	Original Broadway Cast
1988	Les Misérables	Claude-Michel Schönberg, composer; Alain Boublil and Herbert Kretzmer, lyricists; Alain Boublil and Claude-Michel Schönberg, producers	Original Broadway Cast
1988	Me and My Girl (Original Broadway Cast)	Thomas Z. Shepard, producer	Original Broadway Cast
1988	My Fair Lady	Paul Myers, producer	Kiri Te Kanawa, Jeremy Irons and others
1988	The Phantom of the Opera	Andrew Lloyd Webber, composer; Charles Hart and Richard Stilgoe, lyricists; Andrew Lloyd Webber, producer	Original London Cast
1988	South Pacific	Jeremy Lubbock, producer	Kiri Te Kanawa, José Carreras and others
1989	Into the Woods	Stephen Sondheim, composer/lyricist; Jay David Saks, producer	Various Artists
1989	Anything Goes	Jay David Saks, producer	Patti LuPone, Howard McGillin, Bill McCutcheon and others
1989	Chess	Benny Andersson and Björn Ulvaeus, producers	Various Artists
1989	Gershwin: Of Thee I Sing/Let 'Em Eat Cake	Steven Epstein, producer; Michael Tilson Thomas, conductor	Maureen McGovern, Larry Kert and Jack Gilford
1989	Show Boat	John Fraser, producer	Various Artists

=== 1990s ===
Year	Album	Recipient(s)	Artist(s)
1990	Jerome Robbins' Broadway	Jay David Saks, producer	Jason Alexander, Debbie Shapiro and Robert La Fasse
1990	Aspects of Love	Andrew Lloyd Webber, composer; Don Black and Charles Hart, lyricists; Andrew Lloyd Webber, producer	Original London Cast with Ann Crumb, Michael Ball, Kevin Colson and Kathleen Rowe McAllen
1990	Broadway the Hard Way	Frank Zappa, producer	Frank Zappa
1990	Sarafina! The Music of Liberation	Hugh Masekela and Mbongeni Ngema, composers/lyricists; Hugh Masekela, Mbongeni Ngema, Voza Rivers and Rick Rowe, producers	Original Broadway Cast
1990	Sondheim: Pacific Overtures	John A. Yap, producer	The English National Opera conducted by James Holmes
1991	Les Misérables: The Complete Symphonic Recording	David Caddick, producer	Garry Morris and Cast Members
1991	Anything Goes	John Fraser, producer	Kim Criswell, Jack Gilford, Frederica von Stade, Cris Groenendaal and Cast
1991	Black and Blue	Hugh Fordin, producer	Ruth Brown, Linda Hopkins and Original Broadway Cast
1991	City of Angels	Cy Coleman, composer; David Zippel, lyricist; Mike Berniker and Cy Coleman, producers	James Naughton, Gregg Edelman and Original Broadway Cast
1991	Gypsy	John McClure, producer	Tyne Daly and Broadway Cast
1992	The Will Rogers Follies	Cy Coleman, composer; Adolph Green and Betty Comden, lyricists; Mike Berniker and Cy Coleman, producers	Original Broadway Cast
1992	Assassins	Stephen Sondheim, composer/lyricist; Jay David Saks, producer	Original Cast
1992	Kiss Me, Kate	John Fraser, producer	John McGlinn, Josephine Barstow, Thomas Hampson and Kim Criswell
1992	The Music Man	Elaine L. Martone and Robert Woods, producers	Erich Kunzel, conductor; Timothy Noble, Kathleen Brett and Doc Severinsen
1993	Guys and Dolls: The New Broadway Cast Recording	Jay David Saks, producer	The New Broadway Cast
1993	Crazy for You	Thomas Z. Shepard, producer	Original Broadway Cast
1993	Jelly's Last Jam	Luther Henderson, composer; Susan Birkenhead, lyricist; Thomas Z. Shepard, producer	Original Broadway Cast
1993	The King and I	Michael Gore, producer	Julie Andrews, Ben Kingsley, John Mauceri and Hollywood Bowl Orchestra
1993	The Secret Garden	Lucy Simon, composer; Marsha Norman, lyricist; Thomas Z. Shepard, producer	Original Broadway Cast
1994	The Who's Tommy: Original Cast Recording	Pete Townshend, composer/lyricist; George Martin, producer	Original Cast Recording
1994	Bernstein: On the Town	Arend Prohmann, producer	Various Artists
1994	Joseph and the Amazing Technicolor Dreamcoat	Andrew Lloyd Webber, composer; Andrew Lloyd Webber and Nigel Wright, producers	Michael Damian and Cast
1994	Kiss of the Spider Woman	John Kander, composer; Fred Ebb, lyricist; Martin Levan, producer	Original Cast Recording
1994	Sondheim: A Celebration at Carnegie Hall	Jay David Saks, producer	Various Artists
1995	Passion	Stephen Sondheim, composer/lyricist; Phil Ramone, producer	Original Broadway Cast
1995	Beauty and the Beast: A New Musical	Alan Menken, composer; Bruce Botnick and Alan Menken, producers	Original Broadway Cast
1995	Crazy for You	Paul Gemignani and Stewart Mackintosh, producers	Original London Cast
1995	Rodgers and Hammerstein's Carousel	Jay Landers and Tony McAnany, producers	1994 Broadway Cast
1995	Sunset Blvd.	Andrew Lloyd Webber, composer; Don Black and Christopher Hampton, lyricists; Andrew Lloyd Webber and Nigel Wright, producers	American Premiere Cast with Glenn Close
1996	Smokey Joe's Cafe: The Songs of Leiber and Stoller	Jerry Leiber, Arif Mardin and Mike Stoller, producers	Original Broadway Cast
1996	Anyone Can Whistle: Live at Carnegie Hall	Tony McAnany and Joel Moss, producers	Various Artists
1996	Hello, Dolly!	Bruce Kimmel and Bill Meade, producers	The New 1994 Cast with Carol Channing
1996	How to Succeed in Business Without Really Trying	Jay David Saks, producer	Matthew Broderick and the New Broadway Cast
1996	Kiss of the Spider Woman	Thomas Z. Shepard, producer	New Broadway Cast with Vanessa Williams
1997	Riverdance	Bill Whelan, composer/lyricist/producer	Various Artists
1997	Bring in 'da Noise, Bring in 'da Funk	Ann Duquesnay, Zane Mark and Daryl Waters, composers; Ann Duquesnay, Reg E. Gaines and George C. Wolfe, lyricists; James P. Nichols, producer	Original Broadway Cast with Savion Glover
1997	A Funny Thing Happened on the Way to the Forum	Phil Ramone, producer	Original 1996 Broadway Cast
1997	Rent	Jonathan Larson, composer/lyricist; Arif Mardin and Steve Skinner, producers	Original Broadway Cast
1997	Victor/Victoria	Thomas Z. Shepard, producer	Original Broadway Cast with Julie Andrews, Michael Nouri, Tony Roberts and Rachel York
1998	Chicago	Jay David Saks, producer	Various Artists featuring Ann Reinking, Bebe Neuwirth, James Naughton and Joel Grey
1998	Jekyll and Hyde	Karl Richardson abd Frank Wildhorn, producers	Original Broadway Cast
1998	The Life	Cy Coleman, composer; Ira Gasman, lyricist; Mike Berniker and Cy Coleman, producers	Original Broadway Cast
1998	Songs from Ragtime: The Musical	Stephen Flaherty, composer; Lynn Ahrens, lyricist; Jay David Saks, producer	Studio cast
1998	Titanic: A New Musical	Maury Yeston, composer/lyricist; Tommy Krasker and Maury Yeston, producers	Original Broadway Cast
1999	The Lion King	Mark Mancina, producer	Original Broadway Cast Recording
1999	Cabaret	Jay David Saks, producer	New Broadway Cast Recording featuring Natasha Richardson and Alan Cumming
1999	Chicago	Thomas Z. Shepard, producer	London Cast Recording with Ruthie Henshall, Ute Lemper, Henry Goodman and Nigel Planer
1999	Ragtime	Jay David Saks, producer	Original Broadway Cast Recording
1999	The Wizard of Oz	Robert Sher, producer	1998 Cast Recording with Mickey Rooney and Eartha Kitt

=== 2000s ===
Year	Album	Recipient(s)	Artist(s)
2000	Annie Get Your Gun	Stephen Ferrera and John McDaniel, producers	The New Broadway Cast including Bernadette Peters and Tom Wopat
2000	Footloose	Tom Snow, composer; Dean Pitchford, lyricist; Tommy Krasker and Tom Snow, producers	Original Broadway Cast
2000	Fosse	Jay David Saks, producer	Original Broadway Cast starring Valarie Pettiford and Jane Lanier
2000	Hedwig and the Angry Inch	Stephen Trask, composer/lyricist; Brad Wood, producer	Original Cast
2000	You're a Good Man, Charlie Brown	Andrew Lippa, producer	The New Broadway Cast starring Roger Bart, Kristin Chenoweth, Ilana Levine and Stanley Wayne Mathis
2001	Elton John and Tim Rice's Aida	Elton John, composer; Tim Rice, lyricist; Guy Babylon, Paul Bogaev, Frank Filipetti and Chris Montan, producers; Frank Filipetti, engineer/mixer	Original Broadway Cast
2001	Kiss Me, Kate	Hugh Fordin, Paul Gemignani and Don Sebesky, producers	Brian Stokes Mitchell and Marin Mazzie with New Broadway Cast
2001	Meredith Willson's The Music Man	Hugh Fordin, producer	New Broadway Cast
2001	Swing!	Steven Epstein, producer	Original Cast Recording
2001	The Wild Party	Michael John LaChiusa, composer/lyricist; Phil Ramone, producer	Original Cast with Toni Collette, Mandy Patinkin and Eartha Kitt
2002	The Producers	Mel Brooks, composer/lyricist; Hugh Fordin, producer; Cynthia Daniels, engineer	Original Broadway Cast with Nathan Lane and Matthew Broderick
2002	The Full Monty: The Broadway Musical	David Yazbek, composer/lyricist; Billy Straus, David Yazbek and Ted Sperling, producers	Original Broadway Cast
2002	Mamma Mia! The Musical	Nicholas Gilpin and Martin Koch, producer	Original Cast
2002	Seussical the Musical	Stephen Flaherty, composer; Lynn Ahrens, lyricist; Phil Ramone, producer	Original Broadway Cast including Kevin Chamberlin
2002	Sweeney Todd: Live at the New York Philharmonic	Tommy Krasker and Lawrence L. Rock, producers	Patti LuPone, George Hearn and others
2003	Hairspray	Marc Shaiman, composer/lyricist/producer; Scott Wittman, lyricist; Pete Karam, engineer/mixer	Original Broadway Cast — Marissa Jaret Winokur and Harvey Fierstein
2003	Elaine Stritch at Liberty	Hugh Fordin, producer	Elaine Stritch
2003	Guys and Dolls	Hugh Fordin, producer	The 50th Anniversary Cast with Maurice Hines
2003	Into the Woods	Steven Epstein, producer	Musical Cast with Vanessa Williams and John McMartin
2003	Thoroughly Modern Millie	Jeanine Tesori, composer; Dick Scanlan, lyricist; Jay David Saks, producer	Original Broadway Cast including Sutton Foster, Sheryl Lee Ralph and Marc Kudisch
2004	Gypsy	Jay David Saks, producer; Ken Hahn, Tom Lazarus, Jay David Saks and Todd Whitelock, engineers/mixers	New Broadway Cast with Bernadette Peters, Tammy Blanchard, John Dossett and others
2004	Flower Drum Song	Hugh Fordin, producer	New Broadway Cast with Lea Salonga and others
2004	Man of La Mancha	Jay David Saks, producer	The New Broadway Cast Recording with Brian Stokes Mitchell, Mary Elizabeth Mastrantonio, Ernie Sabella and others
2004	Movin' Out	Mike Berniker, Tommy Byrnes and David Rosenthal, producers	Original Broadway Cast with Michael Cavanaugh
2004	Nine: The Musical	Tommy Krasker and Maury Yeston, producers	New Broadway Cast with Antonio Banderas, Chita Rivera and others
2005	Wicked	Stephen Schwartz, composer/lyricist/producer; Frank Filipetti, engineer/mixer	Original Broadway Cast Recording with Kristin Chenoweth and Idina Menzel
2005	Assassins	Tommy Krasker, producer	The Broadway Cast Recording with Neil Patrick Harris, Michael Cerveris and others
2005	Avenue Q: The Musical	Robert Lopez and Jeff Marx, composers/lyricists; Jay David Saks, producer	Original Broadway Cast Recording with Stephanie D'Abruzzo, John Tartaglia and others
2005	The Boy from Oz	Phil Ramone, producer	Original Broadway Cast Recording with Hugh Jackman and others
2005	Wonderful Town	Hugh Fordin, producer	The New Broadway Cast Recording With Donna Murphy
2006	Monty Python's Spamalot	Eric Idle, composer/lyricist/producer; John Du Prez, composer/producer; Frank Filipetti, engineer/mixer	Original Broadway Cast including David Hyde Pierce, Tim Curry, Hank Azaria and Sara Ramirez
2006	The 25th Annual Putnam County Spelling Bee	William Finn, composer/lyricist; Kurt Deutsch and Joel Moss, producers	Original Broadway Cast
2006	Dirty Rotten Scoundrels	David Yazbek, composer/lyricist; Billy Straus and David Yazbek, producers	Original Broadway Cast including John Lithgow and Norbert Leo Butz
2006	Hair	Kurt Deutsch and Joel Moss, producers	The Actors' Fund of America Benefit Recording
2006	The Light In The Piazza	Adam Guettel, composer/lyricist; Steven Epstein, producer	Original Broadway Cast including Victoria Clark and Kelli O'Hara
2007	Jersey Boys	Robert Gaudio, producer; Pete Karam, engineer/mixer	Original Broadway Cast with Christian Hoff, Daniel Reichard, J. Robert Spencer, John Lloyd Young and others
2007	The Color Purple	Stephen Bray, Brenda Russell and Allee Willis, composers/lyricists; Jay David Saks, producer	Original Broadway Cast with LaChanze, Elisabeth Withers-Mendes and others
2007	The Drowsy Chaperone	Lisa Lambert, composer/lyricist; Greg Morrison, composer; Kurt Deutsch, Joel Moss and Phil Reno, producers	Original Broadway Cast with Bob Martin, Sutton Foster, Beth Leavel and others
2007	The Pajama Game	Harry Connick Jr. and Tracey Freeman, producers	New Broadway Cast with Harry Connick Jr., Kelli O'Hara and others
2007	Sweeney Todd: The Demon Barber of Fleet Street	Tommy Krasker, producer	Broadway Cast with Patti LuPone, Michael Cerveris and others
2008	Spring Awakening	Duncan Sheik, composer/producer; Steven Sater, lyricist; Michael Tudor, engineer	Original Broadway Cast with Jonathan Groff, Lea Michele and others
2008	A Chorus Line	David Caddick, producer	2006 New Cast Recording with Various Artists
2008	Company	Tommy Krasker, producer	2006 Cast Recording with Raúl Esparza and others
2008	Grey Gardens	Steven Epstein, producer	Original Broadway Cast with Christine Ebersole, Mary Louise Wilson and others
2008	West Side Story	Nick Patrick, producer	Vittorio Grigolo, Hayley Westenra, Connie Fisher and others
2009	In the Heights	Lin-Manuel Miranda, composer/lyricist; Kurt Deutsch, Alex Lacamoire, Andres Levin, Lin-Manuel Miranda, Joel Moss and Bill Sherman, producers; Tim Latham and Joel Moss, engineers	Original Broadway Cast with Lin-Manuel Miranda and others
2009	Gypsy	Robert Sher, producer	2008 Broadway Cast with Patti LuPone and others
2009	The Little Mermaid	Alan Menken, composer; Glenn Slater, lyricist; Bruce Botnick, Michael Kosarin, Alan Menken and Chris Montan, producers	Original Broadway Cast with Sierra Boggess, Tituss Burgess and others
2009	South Pacific	David Caddick, David Lai and Ted Sperling, producers	New Broadway Cast with Kelli O'Hara, Paulo Szot and others
2009	Young Frankenstein	Mel Brooks, composer/lyricist; Doug Besterman, producer	Original Broadway Cast with Roger Bart, Megan Mullally, Sutton Foster and others

=== 2010s ===
Year	Album	Recipient(s)	Artist(s)
2010	West Side Story	David Caddick and David Lai, producers; Todd Whitelock, engineer/mixer	New Broadway Cast with Matt Cavenaugh, Josefina Scaglione and others
2010	9 to 5: The Musical	Dolly Parton, composer/lyricist; Alex Lacamoire, Stephen Oremus and Dolly Parton, producers	Original Broadway Cast with Allison Janney, Stephanie J. Block, Megan Hilty and others
2010	Ain't Misbehavin'	Robert Sher, producer	30th Anniversary Cast Recording with Ruben Studdard, Frenchie Davis and others
2010	Hair	Noah Cornman, Kurt Deutsch, Joel Moss and Steve Norman, producers	New Broadway Cast with Sasha Allen, Gavin Creel and others
2010	Shrek the Musical	Jeanine Tesori, composer; David Lindsay-Abaire, lyricist; Peter Hylenski and Jeanine Tesori, producers	Original Broadway Cast with Brian d'Arcy James, Sutton Foster and others
2011	American Idiot — Featuring Green Day	Billie Joe Armstrong, producer; Chris Dugan and Chris Lord-Alge, engineers/mixers	Original Broadway Cast with John Gallagher Jr., Michael Esper and others
2011	Fela!	Robert Sher, producer	Original Broadway Cast with Sahr Ngaujah, Lillias White and others
2011	A Little Night Music	Tommy Krasker, producer	2009 Broadway Revival Cast with Catherine Zeta-Jones, Angela Lansbury and others
2011	Promises, Promises	David Caddick and David Lai, producers	New Broadway Cast with Sean Hayes, Kristin Chenoweth and others
2011	Sondheim on Sondheim	Philip Chaffin and Tommy Krasker, producers	Original Broadway Cast with Barbara Cook, Vanessa Williams, Tom Wopat and others
2012	The Book of Mormon	Josh Gad and Andrew Rannells, principal soloists; Robert Lopez, Trey Parker and Matt Stone, composers/lyricists; Anne Garefino, Robert Lopez, Stephen Oremus, Trey Parker, Scott Rudin and Matt Stone, producers; Frank Filipetti, engineer/mixer	Original Broadway Cast
2012	Anything Goes	Sutton Foster and Joel Grey, principal soloists; Rob Fisher, James Lowe and Joel Moss, producers	New Broadway Cast Recording
2012	How to Succeed in Business Without Really Trying	John Larroquette and Daniel Radcliffe, principal soloists; Robert Sher, producer	The 2011 Broadway Cast Recording
2013	Once: A New Musical	Steve Kazee and Cristin Milioti, principal soloists; Steven Epstein and Martin Lowe, producers; Richard King, engineer/mixer	Original Broadway Cast with Steve Kazee, Cristin Milioti and others
2013	Follies	Danny Burstein, Jan Maxwell, Elaine Paige, Bernadette Peters and Ron Raines, principal soloists; Philip Chaffin and Tommy Krasker, producers	New Broadway Cast with Danny Burstein, Jan Maxwell, Elaine Paige, Bernadette Peters, Ron Raines and others
2013	The Gershwins' Porgy & Bess	David Alan Grier, Norm Lewis and Audra McDonald, principal soloists; Tommy Krasker, producer	New Broadway Cast with David Alan Grier, Norm Lewis, Audra McDonald and others
2013	Newsies	Jeremy Jordan and Kara Lindsay, principal soloists; Frank Filipetti, Michael Kosarin, Alan Menken and Chris Montan, producers	Original Broadway Cast with Jeremy Jordan, Kara Lindsay and others
2013	Nice Work If You Can Get It	Matthew Broderick and Kelli O'Hara, principal soloists; David Chase, Bill Elliott and Robert Sher, producers	Original Broadway Cast with Matthew Broderick, Kelli O'Hara and others
2014	Kinky Boots	Billy Porter and Stark Sands, principal soloists; Cyndi Lauper, composer/lyricist; Sammy James Jr., Cyndi Lauper, Stephen Oremus and William Wittman, producers; Derik Lee and William Wittman, engineers/mixers	Original Broadway Cast with Stark Sands, Billy Porter and others
2014	Matilda: The Musical	Bertie Carvel, Sophia Gennusa, Oona Laurence, Bailey Ryon, Milly Shapiro and Lauren Ward, principal soloists; Tim Minchin, composer/lyricist; Michael Croiter, Van Dean and Chris Nightingale, producers	Original Broadway Cast
2014	Motown: The Musical	Brandon Victor Dixon and Valisia LeKae, principal soloists; Frank Filipetti and Ethan Popp, producers	Original Broadway Cast with Brandon Victor Dixon, Valisia LeKae and others
2015	Beautiful: The Carole King Musical	Jessie Mueller, principal soloist; Jason Howland, Steve Sidwell and Billy Jay Stein, producers; Joel Moss, engineer; Jason Howland and Billy Jay Stein, engineers/mixers	Original Broadway Cast
2015	Aladdin	James Monroe Iglehart, Adam Jacobs and Courtney Reed, principal soloists; Frank Filipetti, Michael Kosarin, Alan Menken and Chris Montan, producers	Original Broadway Cast
2015	A Gentleman's Guide to Love & Murder	Jefferson Mays and Bryce Pinkham, principal soloists; Steven Lutvak, composer/lyricist; Robert L. Freedman, lyricist; Kurt Deutsch and Joel Moss, producers	Original Broadway Cast
2015	Hedwig and the Angry Inch	Lena Hall and Neil Patrick Harris, principal soloists; Justin Craig, Tim O'Heir & Stephen Trask, producers	Original Broadway Cast
2015	West Side Story	Cheyenne Jackson and Alexandra Silber, principal soloists; Michael Tilson Thomas and Jack Vad, producers	Cheyenne Jackson and Alexandra Silber with the San Francisco Symphony
2016	Hamilton	Daveed Diggs, Renée Elise Goldsberry, Jonathan Groff, Christopher Jackson, Jasmine Cephas Jones, Leslie Odom Jr., Lin-Manuel Miranda, Okieriete Onaodowan, Anthony Ramos and Phillipa Soo, principal soloists; Lin-Manuel Miranda, composer/lyricist; Alex Lacamoire, Lin-Manuel Miranda, Bill Sherman, Ahmir Thompson and Tarik Trotter, producers; Tim Latham and Derik Lee, engineers	Original Broadway Cast
2016	An American in Paris	Leanne Cope, Max von Essen, Robert Fairchild, Jill Paice and Brandon Uranowitz, principal soloists; Rob Fisher and Scott Lehrer, producers	Original Broadway Cast
2016	Fun Home	Michael Cerveris, Judy Kuhn, Sydney Lucas, Beth Malone and Emily Skeggs, principal soloists; Philip Chaffin and Tommy Krasker, producers	Original Broadway Cast
2016	The King and I	Ruthie Ann Miles, Kelli O'Hara, Ashley Park, Conrad Ricamora and Ken Watanabe, principal soloists; David Lai and Ted Sperling, producers	2015 Broadway Cast
2016	Something Rotten!	Heidi Blickenstaff, Christian Borle, John Cariani, Brian d'Arcy James, Brad Oscar and Kate Reinders, principal soloists; Karey Kirkpatrick and Wayne Kirkpatrick, composers/lyricists; Kurt Deutsch, Karey Kirkpatrick, Wayne Kirkpatrick, Lawrence Manchester, Kevin McCollum and Phil Reno, producers	Original Broadway Cast
2017	The Color Purple	Danielle Brooks, Cynthia Erivo and Jennifer Hudson, principal soloists; Stephen Bray, Van Dean, Frank Filipetti, Roy Furman, Scott Sanders and Jhett Tolentino, producers	New Broadway Cast
2017	Bright Star	Carmen Cusack, principal soloist; Edie Brickell, composer/lyricist; Steve Martin, composer; Jay Alix, Peter Asher and Una Jackman, producers	Original Broadway Cast
2017	Fiddler on the Roof	Danny Burstein, principal soloist; Louise Gund, David Lai and Ted Sperling, producers	2016 Broadway Cast
2017	Kinky Boots	Killian Donnelly and Matt Henry, principal soloists; Sammy James Jr., Cyndi Lauper, Stephen Oremus and William Wittman, producers	Original West End Cast
2017	Waitress	Jessie Mueller, principal soloist; Sara Bareilles, composer/lyricist; Neal Avron, Sara Bareilles and Nadia DiGiallonardo, producers	Original Broadway Cast
2018	Dear Evan Hansen	Laura Dreyfuss, Mike Faist, Rachel Bay Jones, Kristolyn Lloyd, Michael Park, Ben Platt, Will Roland and Jennifer Laura Thompson, principal soloists; Benj Pasek and Justin Paul, composers/lyricists; Pete Ganbarg, Alex Lacamoire, Stacey Mindich, Benj Pasek and Justin Paul, producers	Original Broadway Cast Recording
2018	Come from Away	David Hein and Irene Sankoff, composers/lyricists; Ian Eisendrath, August Eriksmoen, David Hein, David Lai and Irene Sankoff, producers	Original Broadway Cast Recording
2018	Hello, Dolly!	Bette Midler, principal soloist; Steven Epstein, producer	New Broadway Cast Recording
2019	The Band's Visit	Etai Benson, Adam Kantor, Katrina Lenk and Ari'el Stachel, principal soloists; David Yazbek, composer/lyricist; Dean Sharenow and David Yazbek, producers; Dean Sharenow, engineer/mixer	Original Broadway Cast
2019	Carousel	Renée Fleming, Alexander Gemignani, Joshua Henry, Lindsay Mendez and Jessie Mueller, principal soloists; Steven Epstein, producer	2018 Broadway Cast
2019	Jesus Christ Superstar Live in Concert	Sara Bareilles, Alice Cooper, Ben Daniels, Brandon Victor Dixon, Erik Grönwall, Jin Ha, John Legend, Norm Lewis and Jason Tam, principal soloists; Andrew Lloyd Webber and Harvey Mason Jr., producers	Original Television Cast
2019	My Fair Lady	Lauren Ambrose, Norbert Leo Butz and Harry Hadden-Paton, principal soloists; Van Dean, David Lai and Ted Sperling, producers	2018 Broadway Cast
2019	Once on This Island	Phillip Boykin, Merle Dandridge, Quentin Earl Darrington, Hailey Kilgore, Kenita R. Miller, Alex Newell, Isaac Cole Powell and Lea Salonga, principal soloists; Lynn Ahrens, Hunter Arnold, Ken Davenport, Stephen Flaherty and Elliot Scheiner, producers	New Broadway Cast

=== 2020s ===
Year	Album	Recipient(s)	Artist(s)
2020	Hadestown	Reeve Carney, André De Shields, Amber Gray, Eva Noblezada and Patrick Page, principal soloists; Mara Isaacs, David Lai, Anaïs Mitchell and Todd Sickafoose; Isaiah Abolin and Todd Sickafoose, engineers/mixers	Original Broadway Cast
2020	Ain't Too Proud: The Life and Times of the Temptations	Saint Aubyn, Derrick Baskin, James Harkness, Jawan M. Jackson, Jeremy Pope and Ephraim Sykes, principal soloists; Scott M. Riesett, producer	Original Broadway Cast
2020	Moulin Rouge! The Musical	Danny Burstein, Tam Mutu, Sahr Ngaujah, Karen Olivo and Aaron Tveit, principal soloists; Justin Levine, Baz Luhrmann, Matt Stine and Alex Timbers, producers	Original Broadway Cast
2020	The Music of Harry Potter and the Cursed Child in Four Contemporary Suites	Imogen Heap, composer/producer	Imogen Heap
2020	Oklahoma!	Damon Daunno, Rebecca Naomi Jones, Ali Stroker, Mary Testa and Patrick Vaill, principal soloists; Daniel Kluger and Dean Sharenow, producers	2019 Broadway Cast
2021	Jagged Little Pill	Kathryn Gallagher, Celia Rose Gooding, Lauren Patten and Elizabeth Stanley, principal soloists; Neal Avron, Pete Ganbarg, Tom Kitt, Michael Parker, Craig Rosen and Vivek J. Tiwary, producers; Neal Avron and Derik Lee, engineers/mixers	Original Broadway Cast
2021	Amélie	Audrey Brisson, Chris Jared, Caolan McCarthy and Jez Unwin, principal soloists; Daniel Messé, composer/lyricist; Nathan Tysen, lyricist; Michael Fentiman, Sean Patrick Flahaven, Barnaby Race and Nathan Tysen, producers	Original London Cast
2021	American Utopia on Broadway	David Byrne, composer/lyricist/producer	Original Cast
2021	Little Shop of Horrors	Tammy Blanchard, Jonathan Groff and Tom Alan Robbins, principal soloists; Will Van Dyke, Michael Mayer, Alan Menken and Frank Wolf, producers	The New Off-Broadway Cast
2021	The Prince of Egypt	Christine Allado, Luke Brady, Alexia Khadime and Liam Tamne, principal soloists; Stephen Schwartz, composer/lyricist; Dominick Amendum and Stephen Schwartz, producers	Original Cast
2021	Soft Power	Francis Jue, Austin Ku, Alyse Alan Louis and Conrad Ricamora, principal soloists; Jeanine Tesori, composer/lyricist; David Henry Hwang, lyricist; Matt Stine, producer	Original Cast
2022	The Unofficial Bridgerton Musical	Abigail Barlow and Emily Bear, composers/lyricists; Emily Bear, producer; Jon Rezin and Scott Smith, engineers/mixers	Barlow & Bear
2022	Andrew Lloyd Webber's Cinderella	Carrie Hope Fletcher, Ivano Turco, Victoria Hamilton-Barritt and Helen George, principal vocalists; Andrew Lloyd Webber and David Zippel, composers/lyricists; Andrew Lloyd Webber, Nick Lloyd Webber and Greg Wells, producers	Original Album Cast
2022	Burt Bacharach and Steven Sater's Some Lovers	Burt Bacharach, composer; Steven Sater, lyricist; Burt Bacharach, Michael Croiter, Ben Hartman, Cody Lassen and Steven Sater, producers	World Premiere Cast
2022	Girl from the North Country	Simon Hale, Conor McPherson and Dean Sharenow, producers	Original Broadway Cast
2022	Les Misérables: The Staged Concert	Michael Ball, Alfie Boe, Carrie Hope Fletcher and Matt Lucas, principal vocalists; Cameron Mackintosh, Lee McCutcheon and Stephen Metcalfe, producers	The All-Star Staged Concert
2022	Stephen Schwartz's Snapshots	Stephen Schwartz, composer/lyricist; Daniel Levine, Michael J. Moritz Jr., Bryan Perri and Stephen Schwartz, producers	World Premiere Cast
2023	Into the Woods	Sara Bareilles, Brian d'Arcy James, Patina Miller and Phillipa Soo, principal soloists; Rob Berman and Sean Patrick Flahaven, producers; Isaiah Abolin, Ian Kagey and Lawrence Manchester, engineers/mixers	2022 Broadway Cast
2023	Caroline, or Change	John Cariani, Sharon D. Clarke, Caissie Levy and Samantha Williams, principal vocalists; Jeanine Tesori, composer; Tony Kushner, lyricist; Van Dean, Nigel Lilley, Lawrence Manchester, Elliot Scheiner and Jeanine Tesori, producers	New Broadway Cast
2023	MJ the Musical	Myles Frost and Tavon Olds-Sample, principal vocalists; David Holcenberg, Derik Lee and Jason Michael Webb, producers	Original Broadway Cast
2023	Mr. Saturday Night	Shoshana Bean, Billy Crystal, Randy Graff and David Paymer, principal vocalists; Jason Robert Brown, composer; Amanda Green, lyricist; Jason Robert Brown, Sean Patrick Flahaven and Jeffrey Lesser, producers	Original Broadway Cast
2023	Six: Live on Opening Night	Toby Marlow and Lucy Moss, composers/lyricists; Joe Beighton, Tom Curran, Sam Featherstone, Paul Gatehouse, Toby Marlow and Lucy Moss, producers	Original Broadway Cast
2023	A Strange Loop	Jaquel Spivey, principal vocalist; Michael R. Jackson, composer/lyricist; Michael Croiter, Michael R. Jackson, Charlie Rosen and Rona Siddiqui, producers	Original Broadway Cast
2024	Some Like It Hot	Christian Borle, J. Harrison Ghee, Adrianna Hicks and NaTasha Yvette Williams, principal vocalists; Marc Shaiman, composer/lyricist; Scott Wittman, lyricist; Mary-Mitchell Campbell, Bryan Carter, Scott M. Riesett, Charlie Rosen and Marc Shaiman, producers; Marc Shaiman, engineer/mixer	Original Broadway Cast
2024	Kimberly Akimbo	Victoria Clark, principal vocalist; Jeanine Tesori, composer; David Lindsay-Abaire, lyricist; John Clancy, David Stone, and Jeanine Tesori, producers	Original Broadway Cast
2024	Parade	Micaela Diamond, Alex Joseph Grayson, Jake Pedersen and Ben Platt, principal vocalists; Jason Robert Brown, composer/lyricist; Jason Robert Brown and Jeffrey Lesser, producers	2023 Broadway Cast
2024	Shucked	John Behlmann, Andrew Durand, Caroline Innerbichler and Alex Newell, principal vocalists; Brandy Clark and Shane McAnally, composers/lyricists; Brandy Clark, Jason Howland, Shane McAnally and Billy Jay Stein, producers	Original Broadway Cast
2024	Sweeney Todd: The Demon Barber of Fleet Street	Annaleigh Ashford and Josh Groban, principal vocalists; Thomas Kail and Alex Lacamoire, producers	2023 Broadway Cast
2024	Hell's Kitchen	Shoshana Bean, Brandon Victor Dixon, Kecia Lewis and Maleah Joi Moon, principal vocalists; Adam Blackstone, Alicia Keys and Tom Kitt, producers	Original Broadway Cast
2024	Merrily We Roll Along	Jonathan Groff, Lindsay Mendez and Daniel Radcliffe, principal vocalists; David Caddick, Joel Fram, Maria Friedman and David Lai, producers	New Broadway Cast
2024	The Notebook	Ingrid Michaelson, composer/lyricist; John Clancy, Carmel Dean, Kurt Deutsch, Derik Lee, Kevin McCollum and Ingrid Michaelson, producers	Original Broadway Cast
2024	The Outsiders	Joshua Boone, Brent Comer, Brody Grant and Sky Lakota-Lynch, principal vocalists; Zach Chance, Jonathan Clay and Justin Levine, composers/lyricists; Zach Chance, Jonathan Clay, Matt Hinkley, Justin Levine and Lawrence Manchester, producers	Original Broadway Cast
2024	Suffs	Shaina Taub, composer/lyricist; Andrea Grody, Dean Sharenow and Shaina Taub, producers	Original Broadway Cast
2024	The Wiz	Wayne Brady, Deborah Cox, Nichelle Lewis and Avery Wilson, principal vocalists; Joseph Joubert, Allen René Louis and Lawrence Manchester, producers	2024 Broadway Cast Recording
2025	Buena Vista Social Club	Marco Paguia, Dean Sharenow and David Yazbek, producers	Original Broadway Cast
2025	Death Becomes Her	Taurean Everett, Megan Hilty, Josh Lamon, Christopher Sieber, Jennifer Simard and Michelle Williams, principal vocalists; Noel Carey and Julia Mattison, composers/lyricists; Mary-Mitchell Campbell, Noel Carey, Sean Patrick Flahaven, Julia Mattison and Scott M. Riesett, producers	Original Broadway Cast
2025	Gypsy	Danny Burstein, Kevin Csolak, Audra McDonald, Jordan Tyson and Joy Woods, principal vocalists; David Caddick, Andy Einhorn, David Lai and George C. Wolfe, producers	2024 Broadway Cast
2025	Just in Time	Emily Bergl, Jonathan Groff, Erika Henningsen, Gracie Lawrence and Michele Pawk, principal vocalists; Derik Lee, Andrew Resnick, Tom Kirdahy, Alex Timbers and Bill Sherman, producers	Original Broadway Cast
2025	Maybe Happy Ending	Marcus Choi, Darren Criss, Dez Duron and Helen J. Shen, principal vocalists; Will Aronson, composer/lyricist; Hue Park, lyricist; Deborah Abramson, Will Aronson, Ian Kagey and Hue Park, producers	Original Broadway Cast
2027	Chess	Nicholas Christopher, Hannah Cruz, Bradley Dean, Lea Michele, Bryce Pinkham and Aaron Tveit, principal vocalists; Benny Andersson, Ludvig Andersson and Brian Usifer, producers	2025 Broadway Cast
2027	The Lost Boys	Shoshana Bean, LJ Benet, Ali Louis Bourzgui, Paul Alexander Nolan, Benjamin Pajak and Maria Wirries, principal vocalists; Kyler England, Adrianne Gonzalez, Gabriel Mann and Ethan Popp, producers; Kyler England, Adrianne Gonzalez and Gabriel Mann, composers/lyricists	Original Broadway Cast
2027	Ragtime	Colin Donnell, Joshua Henry, Caissie Levy, Nichelle Lewis, Ben Levi Ross and Brandon Uranowitz, principal vocalists; Lynn Ahrens, Sean Patrick Flahaven and Stephen Flaherty, producers	2025 Broadway Cast
2027	Schmigadoon!	Alex Brightman, Sara Chase and Ana Gasteyer, principal vocalists; Doug Besterman, David Chase, Cinco Paul and Scott M. Riesett, producers; Cinco Paul, composer/lyricist	Schmigadoon! Original Broadway Company
2027	Two Strangers (Carry a Cake Across New York)	Christiani Pitts and Sam Tutty, principal vocalists; Jim Barne, Nick Finlow, Tim Jackson and Lux Pyramid, producers; Jim Barne, composer; Kit Buchan, lyricist	Original Broadway Cast

== Shows with multiple wins and nominations ==
=== Shows with multiple wins ===
2 wins:

- Gypsy
- Les Misérables
- West Side Story
- Into the Woods

=== Shows with multiple nominations ===
5 nominations

- Gypsy

4 nominations

- West Side Story
- Into the Woods
- Sweeney Todd: The Demon Barber of Fleet Street

3 nominations:

- Anything Goes
- Chicago
- Follies
- Guys and Dolls
- Hair
- Hello, Dolly!
- How to Succeed in Business Without Really Trying
- The King and I
- Les Misérables
- A Little Night Music
- The Music Man
- My Fair Lady
- Ragtime

2 nominations:

- Ain't Misbehavin'
- Assassins
- Carousel
- Cabaret
- Cats
- Chess
- A Chorus Line
- A Funny Thing Happened on the Way to the Forum
- Company
- Crazy for You
- The Color Purple
- Fiddler on the Roof
- Flower Drum Song
- Hedwig and the Angry Inch
- Joseph and the Amazing Technicolor Dreamcoat
- Kiss of the Spider Woman
- Kiss Me, Kate
- Kinky Boots
- Little Shop of Horrors
- Man of La Mancha
- Me and My Girl
- Merrily We Roll Along
- Nine
- Oklahoma!
- Pacific Overtures
- Promises, Promises
- South Pacific
- Sweet Charity
- The Wiz
- You're a Good Man, Charlie Brown
- Zorba

== Individuals with multiple wins and nominations ==
=== Individuals with multiple wins ===
6 wins:

- Thomas Z. Shepard
- Stephen Sondheim

5 wins:

- Frank Filipetti
- Jay David Saks

3 wins:

- Alex Lacamoire
- Charles Strouse

2 wins:

- David Caddick
- Pete Ganbarg
- Pete Karam
- Tom Kitt
- David Lai
- Goddard Lieberson
- Lin-Manuel Miranda
- Stephen Oremus
- Phil Ramone
- Tim Rice
- Richard Rodgers
- Stephen Schwartz
- Marc Shaiman
- Dean Sharenow
- Phillipa Soo
- Bill Sherman
- Andrew Lloyd Webber
- Todd Whitelock
- Scott Wittman
- David Yazbek

=== Individuals with multiple nominations ===
25 nominations

- Thomas Z. Shepard

17 nominations

- Jay David Saks

16 nominations

- Stephen Sondheim

12 nominations

- Tommy Krasker

10 nominations

- David Lai

9 nominations

- Cy Coleman
- Hugh Fordin
- Andrew Lloyd Webber

8 nominations

- Mike Berniker
- Kurt Deutsch
- Steven Epstein
- Frank Filipetti

7 nominations

- David Caddick
- John Kander
- Phil Ramone
- Robert Sher

6 nominations

- Jerry Bock
- Fred Ebb
- Sheldon Harnick
- Alan Menken
- Joel W. Moss
- Richard Rodgers
- Stephen Schwartz

5 nominations

- Betty Comden
- Sean Patrick Flahaven
- Adolph Green
- Jerry Herman
- Alex Lacamoire
- Kelli O'Hara
- Dean Sharenow
- Ted Sperling
- Jule Styne

4 nominations

- Lynn Ahrens
- Danny Burstein
- Van Dean
- Stephen Flaherty
- Sutton Foster
- Jonathan Groff
- Derik Lee
- Alan Jay Lerner
- Lawrence Manchester
- Chris Montan
- Stephen Oremus
- Scott M. Riesett
- Jeanine Tesori
- David Yazbek

3 nominations

- Shoshana Bean
- Sara Bareilles
- Philip Chaffin
- Michael Croiter
- Brian d'Arcy James
- Brandon Victor Dixon
- Dorothy Fields
- Micki Grant
- Goddard Lieberson
- Derik Lee
- Patti LuPone
- Bob Merrill
- Joel Moss
- Jessie Mueller
- Michael Kosarin
- Charles Strouse
- Bill Sherman
- Tim Rice

2 nominations

- Lee Adams
- Benny Andersson
- Julie Andrews
- Peter Asher
- Neal Avron
- Burt Bacharach
- Doug Besterman
- Christian Borle
- Stephen Bray
- Matthew Broderick
- Jason Robert Brown
- Norbert Leo Butz
- Sammy Cahn
- John Cariani
- Martin Charnin
- David Chase
- John Clancy
- Victoria Clark
- Carrie Hope Fletcher
- Pete Ganbarg
- Gary Geld
- Paul Gemignani
- Joshua Henry
- Megan Hilty
- Sammy James, Jr.
- Tom Jones
- Pete Karam
- Tom Kitt
- Henry Krieger
- Cyndi Lauper
- Jeffrey Lesser
- Justin Levine
- Caissie Levy
- Norm Lewis
- Galt MacDermot
- Tony McAnany
- Kevin McCollum
- Audra McDonald
- Lindsay Mendez
- Lin-Manuel Miranda
- Alex Newell
- Bernadette Peters
- Bryce Pinkham
- Ben Platt
- Daniel Radcliffe
- Phil Reno
- Conrad Ricamora
- Lea Salonga
- Steven Sater
- Elliot Scheiner
- Harvey Schmidt
- Marc Shaiman
- Phillipa Soo
- Billy Jay Stein
- Matt Stine
- Kiri Te Kanawa
- Stephen Trask
- Aaron Tveit
- Peter Udell
- Brandon Uranowitz
- Jimmy Van Heusen
- Todd Whitelock
- Meredith Willson
- William Wittman
- Scott Wittman
- George C. Wolfe
