= List of awards and nominations received by Stephen Sondheim =

Stephen Sondheim awards and nominations
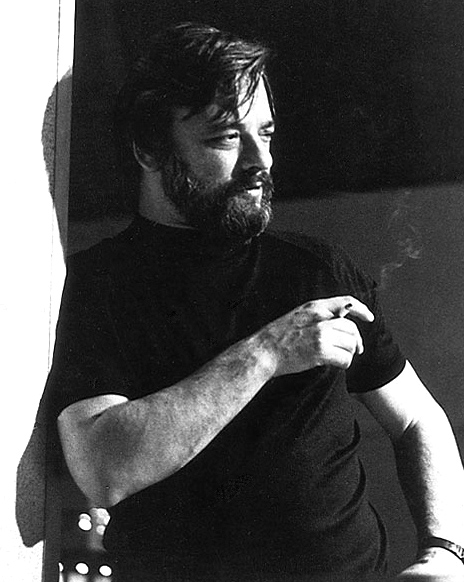
- Sondheim circa 1970
Awards and nominations
Award	Wins	Nominations
Academy Awards	1	1
Golden Globe Awards	0	2
Grammy Awards	8	18
Laurence Olivier Awards	5	9
Pulitzer Prize	1	1
Tony Awards	8	12

Totals (Note: Certain award groups do not simply award one winner. They acknowledge several different recipients, have runners-up, and have third place. Since this is a specific recognition and is different from losing an award, runner-up mentions are considered wins in this award tally. For simplification and to avoid errors, each award in this list has been presumed to have had a prior nomination.)
- Wins: 44
- Nominations: 75

This article is a list of awards and nominations received by Stephen Sondheim.

Stephen Sondheim (1930–2021) was an American composer and lyricist known for his work in musical theatre and film. He has received numerous accolades including an Academy Award, eight Grammy Awards, five Laurence Olivier Awards, a Pulitzer Prize and eight Tony Awards. Sondheim has received several honorary awards including an induction into the American Theater Hall of Fame in 1983, the Kennedy Center Honors in 1993, the National Medal of Arts in 1996, a Lifetime Achievement Tony Award in 2008, and the Society of London Theatre Special Award in 2011, and the Presidential Medal of Freedom (2015). Theaters were named in his honor on Broadway in 2010 and London's West End in 2019.

Known primarily for his work on the Broadway stage, he started his career as a lyricist for the musicals West Side Story (1957), Gypsy (1959), and Do I Hear a Waltz? (1965), the later of which earned him a nomination for the Tony Award for Best Original Score. He wrote A Funny Thing Happened on the Way to the Forum (1962), his first musical as both a composer and lyricist, followed by Anyone Can Whistle (1964) and Evening Primrose (1965). He earned critical acclaim for his musical Company (1970) earning Tony Awards for Best Original Score and Best Lyricist of a Musical. He won further Tony Awards for Best Original Score for Follies (1972), A Little Night Music (1973), Sweeney Todd: The Demon Barber of Fleet Street (1979), Into the Woods (1986), and Passion (1994). For his musical Sunday in the Park with George (1984) he won the Pulitzer Prize for Drama.

For his work on the West End he won two Laurence Olivier Awards for Best New Musical for Sweeney Todd: The Demon Barber of Fleet Street in 1980 and Follies in 1987. He won the Laurence Olivier Award for Best New Musical twice for Sunday in the Park with George in 1991 and Merrily We Roll Along in 2001. He was Olivier-nominated for Side by Side by Sondheim in 1976, Into the Woods in 1991, Assassins in 1993, and Passion in 1997. He was nominated for the Laurence Olivier Award for Outstanding Musical Contribution for Follies in 2018.

On film, he wrote three songs for the Warren Beatty directed crime action film Dick Tracy (1990), "More", What Can You Lose?", and "Sooner or Later (I Always Get My Man)", the later of which earned him the Academy Award for Best Original Song. He was also nominated for two Golden Globe Awards for Best Original Song and two Grammy Awards for Best Song Written for Visual Media. He won six Grammy Awards for Best Musical Theater Album for Company (1971), A Little Night Music (1974), Sweeney Todd: The Demon Barber of Fleet Street (1980), Sunday in the Park with George (1985), Into the Woods (1989) and Passion (1995). He won the Grammy Award for Song of the Year for "Send in the Clowns" (1976).

== Major awards ==
=== Academy Awards ===
Year	Category	Nominated work	Result	Ref.
1990	Best Original Song	"Sooner or Later (I Always Get My Man)" (from Dick Tracy)	Won	

=== Golden Globe Awards ===
Year	Category	Nominated work	Result	Ref.
1990	Best Original Song	"Sooner or Later" (from Dick Tracy)	Nominated	
1990	Best Original Song	"What Can You Lose?" (from Dick Tracy)	Nominated	

=== Grammy Awards ===
Year	Category	Nominated work	Result	Ref.
1960	Song of the Year	"Small World"	Nominated	
1963	Best Original Cast Show Album	A Funny Thing Happened on the Way to the Forum	Nominated	
1966	Best Score from an Original Cast	Do I Hear a Waltz?	Nominated	
1971	Best Score from an Original Cast	Company	Won	
1972	Best Score from an Original Cast	Follies	Nominated	
1974	Best Score from the Original Cast Show Album	A Little Night Music	Won	
1976	Best Cast Show Album	A Little Night Music	Nominated	
1976	Song of the Year	"Send In the Clowns"	Won	
1977	Best Cast Show Album	Pacific Overtures	Nominated	
1980	Best Cast Show Album	Sweeney Todd: The Demon Barber of Fleet Street	Won	
1983	Best Cast Show Album	Merrily We Roll Along	Nominated	
1985	Best Cast Show Album	Sunday in the Park with George	Won	
1989	Best Musical Cast Show Album	Into the Woods	Won	
1991	Best Song Written for a Visual Media	"More" (from Dick Tracy)	Nominated	
1991	Best Song Written for a Visual Media	"Sooner or Later" (from Dick Tracy)	Nominated	
1992	Best Musical Theater Album	Assassins	Nominated	
1995	Best Musical Theater Album	Passion	Won	
2008	Trustees Award	Himself	Honored	

=== Laurence Olivier Awards ===
Year	Category	Nominated work	Result	Ref.
1976	Musical of the Year	Side by Side by Sondheim	Nominated	
1980	Musical of the Year	Sweeney Todd	Won	
1987	Musical of the Year	Follies	Won	
1991	Best New Musical	Sunday in the Park with George	Won	
1991	Best New Musical	Into the Woods	Nominated	
1993	Best New Musical	Assassins	Nominated	
1997	Best New Musical	Passion	Nominated	
2001	Best New Musical	Merrily We Roll Along	Won	
2011	Society of London Theatre Special Award	Himself	Honored	
2018	Best Original Score or New Orchestrations	Follies	Nominated	

=== Pulitzer Prize ===
Year	Category	Nominated work	Result	Ref.
1985	Pulitzer Prize for Drama	Sunday in the Park with George	Won	

=== Tony Awards ===
Year	Category	Nominated work	Result	Ref.
1965	Best Original Score (with Richard Rodgers)	Do I Hear a Waltz?	Nominated	
1971	Best Original Musical Score	Company	Won	
1971	Best Lyricist of a Musical	Company	Won	
1972	Best Original Score	Follies	Won	
1973	Best Original Score	A Little Night Music	Won	
1976	Best Original Score	Pacific Overtures	Nominated	
1979	Best Original Score	Sweeney Todd: The Demon Barber of Fleet Street	Won	
1982	Best Original Score	Merrily We Roll Along	Nominated	
1984	Best Original Score	Sunday in the Park with George	Nominated	
1988	Best Original Score	Into the Woods	Won	
1994	Best Original Score	Passion	Won	
2008	Special Tony Award	Himself	Honored	

== Miscellaneous awards ==
Organizations	Year	Category	Nominated work	Result	Ref.
Drama Desk Awards	1970	Outstanding Musical	Company	Won	
Drama Desk Awards	1970	Outstanding Music	Company	Won (Note: Tied with Kurt Weill for Mahagonny.)	
Drama Desk Awards	1970	Outstanding Lyrics	Company	Won (Note: Tied with Bertolt Brecht for Mahagonny.)	
Drama Desk Awards	1971	Outstanding Music	Follies	Won	
Drama Desk Awards	1971	Outstanding Lyrics	Follies	Won	
Drama Desk Awards	1973	Outstanding Music	A Little Night Music	Won	
Drama Desk Awards	1973	Outstanding Lyrics	A Little Night Music	Won	
Drama Desk Awards	1976	Outstanding Music	Pacific Overtures	Nominated	
Drama Desk Awards	1976	Outstanding Lyrics	Pacific Overtures	Nominated	
Drama Desk Awards	1979	Outstanding Music	Sweeney Todd: The Demon Barber of Fleet Street	Won	
Drama Desk Awards	1979	Outstanding Lyrics	Sweeney Todd: The Demon Barber of Fleet Street	Won	
Drama Desk Awards	1982	Outstanding Music	Merrily We Roll Along	Nominated	
Drama Desk Awards	1982	Outstanding Lyrics	Merrily We Roll Along	Won (Note: Tied with Maury Yeston for Nine.)	
Drama Desk Awards	1984	Outstanding Music	Sunday in the Park with George	Nominated	
Drama Desk Awards	1984	Outstanding Lyrics	Sunday in the Park with George	Won	
Drama Desk Awards	1988	Outstanding Music	Into the Woods	Nominated	
Drama Desk Awards	1988	Outstanding Lyrics	Into the Woods	Won	
Drama Desk Awards	1991	Outstanding Music	Assassins	Nominated	
Drama Desk Awards	1991	Outstanding Lyrics	Assassins	Nominated	
Drama Desk Awards	1994	Outstanding Music	Passion	Won	
Drama Desk Awards	1994	Outstanding Lyrics	Passion	Won	
Drama Desk Awards	2000	Outstanding Music	Saturday Night	Nominated	
Drama Desk Awards	2000	Outstanding Lyrics	Saturday Night	Won	
Drama Desk Awards	2009	Outstanding Music	Road Show	Nominated	
Drama Desk Awards	2009	Outstanding Lyrics	Road Show	Won	
Edgar Awards	1974	Best Motion Picture	The Last of Sheila (Shared with Anthony Perkins)	Won	
IFMCA Awards	2021	Kyle Renick Special Award	West Side Story	Won	
Obie Awards	2009	Music and Lyrics	Road Show	Won	
OFTA Awards	2007	Best Adapted Song	"Johanna" (from Sweeney Todd: The Demon Barber of Fleet Street)	Nominated	
OFTA Awards	2019	Best Adapted Song	"Being Alive" (from Marriage Story)	Won	
OFTA Awards	2021	Best Adapted Song	"America" (for West Side Story)	Runner-up	
St. Louis Gateway Film Critics Association	2007	Best Score	Sweeney Todd: The Demon Barber of Fleet Street	Won	

== Honorary awards ==
Organization	Year	Honor	Result	Ref.
Songwriters Hall of Fame	1975	Inductee	Honored	
American Theater Hall of Fame	1982	Inductee	Honored	
John F. Kennedy Center for the Performing Arts	1993	Kennedy Center Honors	Honored	
President Bill Clinton	1996	National Medal of Arts	Honored	
The Imperial Family of Japan The Japan Art Association	2000	Praemium Imperiale	Honored	
Tony Awards	2008	Special Tony Award	Honored	
The Recording Academy	2008	Trustees Award	Honored	
Laurence Olivier Awards	2011	Society of London Theatre Special Award	Honored	
MacDowell Artists' Residency	2013	Edward MacDowell Medal	Honored	
President Barack Obama	2015	Presidential Medal of Freedom	Honored	

== See also ==
- List of EGOT winners
