= Marie Wallace =

American stage and television actress (born 1935)

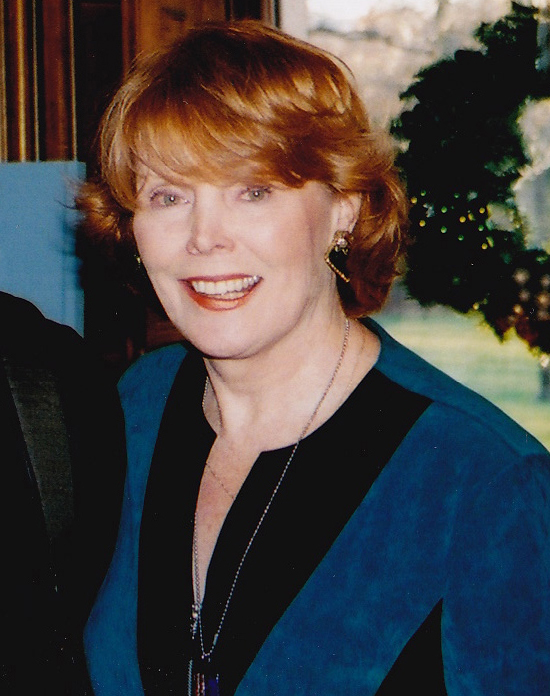
- Marie Wallace in 2001
- Born: May 19, 1935 (age 91); New York City, New York, U.S.
- Occupation: Actress
- Years active: 1959–present
- Known for: Dark Shadows
- Spouse: Gregory Pollock (1959 - early 1970s)

Marie Wallace (born May 19, 1935) is an American stage and television actress, best known for her performances in the gothic soap opera Dark Shadows.

== Early life and career ==
Marie Wallace was born in New York City on May 19, 1939, and grew up in the Yorkville neighborhood, on Manhattan's Upper East Side. She dreamt of being a star at an early age, having been inspired by the theatrical personality of Rev. Ralph Washington Sockman, the minister of Christ Church Methodist, the church she attended in Manhattan.

As a teenager, Wallace appeared in an Off-Broadway production, and also did modelling. With her dark red hair, green eyes, classic features, and tall, slender figure, she was popular on the runway, and often did print work. In 1959, Wallace performed on Broadway as a showgirl in Gypsy starring Ethel Merman. Wallace continued to perform in Broadway shows in the 1960s and early 1970s including the 1966 production of Sweet Charity in the role of Ursula March.

== Dark Shadows ==
In 1968, Wallace received national attention when she landed the first of three roles in the Gothic soap opera Dark Shadows produced by Dan Curtis. Her first appearance was on October 4, and she played the part of the diabolical Frankenstein-like monster Eve. She played Jenny Collins, the demented wife of Quentin Collins (David Selby), Wallace's personal favorite character, who was notable for her unkempt mane of red hair, black lace dress, and hysterical, cackling laughter. Her last part in the series was Megan Todd, an antique shop owner in the "Leviathan" storyline. Her final episode on the program aired on March 16, 1970. In 2009, she returned to the world of Dark Shadows in the series of audio dramas produced by Big Finish Productions. In 2010, she reprised the role of Jenny Collins in The Doll House.

== Later career ==
After Dark Shadows, Wallace had a part as the delightfully evil India Bishop Delaney in Somerset, a soap opera spin-off from Another World. She continued to perform on Broadway, in soap operas, the theatre, and did many television commercials. In 1993, she played the part of Eleanor of Aquitaine in a stage production of The Lion In Winter which was directed by her former Dark Shadows co-star Jonathan Frid. She still occasionally performs to this day. Wallace is also a photographer, and spends much time involved in charity work. Her longtime friend Ruth Buzzi described Wallace as having "grace, beauty, intelligence, sincerity, and kindness." In 2005, her autobiography, entitled On Stage and In Shadows, was published. A lively chronicle of her early life and especially her unique career in the theater, on Broadway and off, the book was edited by her dear friends Craig Hamrick, author of Barnabas & Co., and Michael Karol, author of The ABC Movie of the Week Companion.

Wallace collaborated with freelance writer (and long-time Dark Shadows fan) Rod Labbe on an interview for Scary Monsters magazine, which was published in issue #55, a "special" Dark Shadows edition. Labbe followed-up with another interview in issue #77, this time focusing on Wallace's recently released autobiography. He also interviewed her for Fangoria #313, the issue devoted to the 2012 Johnny Depp/Tim Burton version of Dark Shadows. This interview was entitled: "Marie Wallace: Eve of Destruction." A fourth interview, entitled "The Marie Wallace Chronicles," appeared in Scary Monsters #104, published in 2017. All four interviews garnered Labbe Rondo Award nominations for Best Article and Best Interview.

Wallace was extensively interviewed with her longtime friend Barbara London for the theater magazine The Sondheim Review, published in the winter of 2008, about their experiences with Ethel Merman in Gypsy as branches of the stripper Christmas tree that climaxed the stripper montage near the end of the show; including a story about an on-stage monkey who got quite excited when Merman sang. Written by a fellow member of a NY acting workshop, John Ellis, it supplements the stories in Wallace's own memoir.

On June 24, 2012 Wallace co-starred with Larry Storch in a production of Love Letters that benefitted The Actors' Temple in New York City.

== Personal life ==
In 1959, Wallace married Gregory Pollock, a plastic surgeon who was a former actor. He died in the early 1970s.
