= A Little Night Music (disambiguation) =

A Little Night Music is a 1973 musical with music and lyrics by Stephen Sondheim and book by Hugh Wheeler.

A Little Night Music may also refer to:

== Painting ==
- Eine Kleine Nachtmusik, a 1943 painting by Dorothea Tanning

== Television episodes ==
- "A Little Night Music'" (The Americans), an episode of The Americans
- "A Little Night Music" (Designing Women), an episode of Designing Women
- "A Little Night Music" (Desperate Housewives), an episode of Desperate Housewives

== Other uses ==
- A Little Night Music (original Broadway cast recording), a 1973 album containing a recording of the musical
- A Little Night Music (film), the 1977 film adaptation of the 1973 musical
- "A Little Night Music", literal translation of Eine kleine Nachtmusik ("A little serenade"), a 1787 composition by Mozart

== See also ==
- Eine kleine Nachtmusik (album), 1986 by Venom
