= Andy Propst =

American theatre critic (1965–2021)

- Born: March 7, 1965; Urbana, Illinois, U.S.
- Died: September 6, 2021 (aged 56)
- Occupations: Theater critic, journalist, writer

Andy Propst (March 7, 1965 – September 6, 2021) was an arts journalist, theater critic, and writer living in Peachtree City, Georgia.

== Early work as a critic ==
In 1998, he founded what would become one of the Internet's first major theater portals for theater news, reviews and production listings online, AmericanTheaterWeb.com. It was a site that predated and inspired such sites as TheaterMania and BroadwayWorld.com.

The uniqueness of the site and its pioneering nature for the theater community attracted remarkable press coverage, including a feature in The New York Times.

== Expanding outlets ==
Propst continued to run the site through 2009, even as he began to write reviews and features for print publications, including Backstage, The Village Voice, TimeOut NY, and The Sondheim Review. He and AmericanTheaterWeb also became affiliated with XM Satellite Radio's XM 28 On Broadway Channel, and for four years, he provided daily "Broadway and Beyond" reports and served as a deejay for the channel with programs airing Monday-Friday.

In 2009, he joined the staff of TheaterMania, writing news and reviews, and providing ongoing coverage of theater music available digitally and on disc. He also served as Senior Editor when the site launched its iPad magazine app in 2011, a position he retained until 2013. He subsequently contributed to Huffington Post, and served as a writer for Sh-K-Boom/Ghostlight Records.

== Other affiliations ==
In addition to his writing, Propst served for three consecutive years as a nominator for the Drama Desk Awards (2005-2007) and was secretary and judge for three years for The Village Voice's Obie Awards (2009-2011 ).

Propst is an alum of the Eugene O'Neill Theatre Center's National Critics Institute and has returned to the program to serve as a mentor to young critics since 2008. He has also been a reader for and mentor at the organization's National Music Theater Conference.

Propst returned to reviewing for AmericanTheaterWeb.com and for the 2015-2016 season, once again served as a member of the Drama Desk Awards' Nomimnating Committee.

== Work as a writer ==
His first book, You Fascinate Me So: The Life and Times of Cy Coleman, was published in April 2015 by Applause Books. Oxford University Press will release his second book, They Made Us Happy: The Musicals and Movies of Betty Comden and Adolph Green, in March 2019. He is currently at work on The 100 Most Important People in Musical Theater History for Rowman & Littlefield.

In early 2013, Propst provided the liner notes for two-time Tony Award winner Patti LuPone's CD Far Away Places. Since then he has written notes for three CDs from Harbinger Records, including Barnum Backer's Audition and A Jazzman's Broadway.
