= 27th Annual Grammy Awards =

1985 US music awards ceremony

- Date: February 26, 1985
- Location: Shrine Auditorium, Los Angeles
- Hosted by: John Denver
- Most awards: Prince, Tina Turner (4)
- Most nominations: Prince, Tina Turner (5)

Television/radio coverage
- Network: CBS

The 27th Annual Grammy Awards were held on February 26, 1985, at Shrine Auditorium, Los Angeles, and were broadcast live in the United States by CBS. They recognized accomplishments by musicians from the year 1984.

== Performers ==
- Huey Lewis & The News - The Heart of Rock & Roll
- Hank Williams Jr. & BB King - All My Rowdy Friends Are Coming Over Tonight
- Cyndi Lauper - Time After Time
- Amy Grant - Angels
- Stevie Wonder - I Just Called To Say I Love You
- Debbie Allen, Nia Peeples & The cast of West Side Story - America
- Tina Turner - What's Love Got To Do With It
- Rev. James Cleveland & the Southern California Community Choir, Andrae Crouch, Pops Staples, Deniece Williams, Clark Sisters - Can't Nobody Do Me Like Jesus
- Chaka Khan & Melle Mel - I Feel For You
- Howard Jones, Thomas Dolby, Herbie Hancock, & Stevie Wonder - Synth instrumental
- Kenny Loggins - Footloose
- Julia Migenes-Johnson
- Prince & Sheila E. - Baby I'm A Star
- Shel Silverstein - Unknown

== Presenters ==
- Laurie Anderson & Ray Davies - Best New Artist; Hulk Hogan acted as her bodyguard
- Dee Snider & Sheila E. - Best Pop Vocal Performance Male
- Jeffrey Osborne & Wendy & Lisa - Best Long Form Album
- Linda Ronstadt & Michael Tilson Thomas - Presented Leonard Bernstein with the Lifetime Achievement Award
- Julian Lennon & Andy Summers - Best Female Pop Performance
- Henry Mancini & Andrew Lloyd Webber - Best Album of Original Score Written for a Motion Picture or a Television Special
- The Judds - Best Male Country Vocal Performance
- Anne Murray & Sammy Hagar - Producer of the Year
- Jermaine & Philip Bailey - Best Female R&B Vocal Performance
- Andy Williams - Introduced the Grammy Hall of Fame
- Randy Newman & Kim Carnes - Song of the Year
- Diana Ross - Record of the Year

== Award winners ==
Record of the Year

- "What's Love Got To Do With It" – Tina Turner
  - Terry Britten, producer
- "Hard Habit To Break" – Chicago
  - David Foster, producer
- "Girls Just Want To Have Fun" – Cyndi Lauper
  - Rick Chertoff, producer
- "The Heart Of Rock And Roll" – Huey Lewis and the News
  - Huey Lewis and the News, producers
- "Dancing In The Dark" – Bruce Springsteen
  - Jon Landau, Chuck Plotkin, Little Steven & Bruce Springsteen, producers

Album of the Year

- Can't Slow Down – Lionel Richie
  - James Anthony Carmichael & Lionel Richie, producers
- She's So Unusual – Cyndi Lauper
  - Rick Chertoff, producer
- Purple Rain – Prince & The Revolution
  - Prince & The Revolution, producers
- Born in the U.S.A. – Bruce Springsteen
  - Jon Landau, Chuck Plotkin & Bruce Springsteen, producers
- Private Dancer – Tina Turner
  - Terry Britten, Carter, Leon "Ndugu" Chancler, Wilton Felder, Rupert Hine, Joe Sample, Greg Walsh & Martyn Ware, producers

Song of the Year

- "What's Love Got To Do With It"
  - Terry Britten and Graham Lyle, songwriters (Tina Turner)
- "Against All Odds (Take a Look at Me Now)"
  - Phil Collins, songwriter (Phil Collins)
- "Hello"
  - Lionel Richie, songwriter (Lionel Richie)
- "I Just Called to Say I Love You"
  - Stevie Wonder, songwriter (Stevie Wonder)
- "Time After Time"
  - Cyndi Lauper and Rob Hyman, songwriters (Cyndi Lauper)

Best New Artist

- Cyndi Lauper
- Sheila E.
- Frankie Goes to Hollywood
- Corey Hart
- The Judds

=== Blues ===
- Best Traditional Blues Recording
  - Sugar Blue, John P. Hammond, J.B. Hutto & the New Hawks, Luther "Guitar Junior" Johnson, Koko Taylor & the Blues Machine & Stevie Ray Vaughan & Double Trouble for Blues Explosion

=== Children's ===
- Best Recording for Children
  - Ron Haffkine (producer) & Shel Silverstein for Where the Sidewalk Ends

=== Classical ===
- Best Classical Orchestral Recording
  - Jay David Saks (producer), Leonard Slatkin (conductor) & the St. Louis Symphony for Prokofiev: Symphony No. 5 in B Flat
- Best Classical Vocal Performance
  - Pierre Boulez (conductor), Heather Harper, Jessye Norman & José van Dam, the BBC Symphony Orchestra & the Ensemble InterContemporain for Ravel: Songs of Maurice Ravel
- Best Opera Recording
  - Michel Glotz (producer), Lorin Maazel (conductor), Julia Migenes-Johnson, Plácido Domingo, Ruggero Raimondi, Faith Esham, the Choeur de Radio France and Maîtrise de Radio France & the Orchestre National de France for Bizet: Carmen (Original Soundtrack)
- Best Choral Performance (other than opera)
  - James Levine (conductor), Margaret Hillis (choir director) & the Chicago Symphony Orchestra & Chorus for Brahms: A German Requiem
- Best Classical Performance – Instrumental Soloist or Soloists (with orchestra)
  - Raymond Leppard (conductor), Wynton Marsalis & the English Chamber Orchestra for Wynton Marsalis, Edita Gruberova: Handel, Purcell, Torelli, Fasch, Molter
- Best Classical Performance – Instrumental Soloist or Soloists (without orchestra)
  - Yo-Yo Ma for Bach: The Unaccompanied Cello Suites
- Best Chamber Music Performance
  - The Juilliard String Quartet for Beethoven: The Late String Quartets
- Best New Classical Composition
  - Samuel Barber (composer) & Christian Badea (conductor) for Antony and Cleopatra
- Best Classical Album
  - John Strauss (producer), Neville Marriner (conductor), the Ambrosian Opera Chorus, Choristers of Westminster Abbey & the Academy of St Martin in the Fields for Amadeus (Original Soundtrack)

=== Comedy ===
- Best Comedy Recording
  - "Weird Al" Yankovic for "Eat It"

=== Composing and arranging ===
- Best Instrumental Composition (tie)
  - Randy Newman (composer) for "The Natural"
  - John Williams (composer) for "Olympic Fanfare and Theme" the official music of the XXIII Olympiad
- Best Album of Original Score Written for a Motion Picture or A Television Special
  - Lisa Coleman, John L. Nelson, Prince (musician) & Wendy Melvoin (composers) for Purple Rain performed by Prince
- Best Arrangement on an Instrumental
  - Quincy Jones & Jeremy Lubbock (arrangers) for "Grace (Gymnastics Theme)" performed by Quincy Jones
- Best Instrumental Arrangement Accompanying Vocal(s)
  - David Foster & Jeremy Lubbock (arrangers) for "Hard Habit To Break" performed by Chicago (band)
- Best Vocal Arrangement for Two or More Voices
  - Anita Pointer, June Pointer & Ruth Pointer (arrangers) for "Automatic" performed by The Pointer Sisters

=== Country ===
- Best Country Vocal Performance, Female
  - Emmylou Harris for "In My Dreams"
- Best Country Vocal Performance, Male
  - Merle Haggard for "That's the Way Love Goes"
- Best Country Performance by a Duo or Group with Vocal
  - The Judds for "Mama He's Crazy"
- Best Country Instrumental Performance
  - Ricky Skaggs for "Wheel Hoss"
- Best Country Song
  - Steve Goodman (songwriter) for "City of New Orleans" performed by Willie Nelson

=== Folk ===
- Best Ethnic or Traditional Folk Recording
  - Elizabeth Cotten for Elizabeth Cotten Live!

=== Gospel ===
- Best Gospel Performance, Female
  - Amy Grant for "Angels"
- Best Gospel Performance, Male
  - Michael W. Smith for Michael W. Smith 2
- Best Gospel Performance by a Duo or Group
  - Debby Boone & Phil Driscoll for "Keep The Flame Burning"
- Best Soul Gospel Performance, Female
  - Shirley Caesar for Sailin'
- Best Soul Gospel Performance, Male
  - Andrae Crouch for "Always Remember"
- Best Soul Gospel Performance by a Duo or Group
  - Shirley Caesar & Al Green for "Sailin' on the Sea of Your Love"
- Best Inspirational Performance
  - Donna Summer for "Forgive Me"

=== Historical ===
- Best Historical Album
  - J.R. Taylor (producer) for Big Band Jazz performed by Count Basie, Tommy Dorsey, Benny Goodman, Fletcher Henderson, Chick Webb, Paul Whiteman & others

=== Jazz ===
- Best Jazz Instrumental Performance, Soloist
  - Wynton Marsalis for "Hot House Flowers"
- Best Jazz Instrumental Performance, Group
  - Art Blakey for New York Scene performed by Art Blakey & the Jazz Messengers
- Best Jazz Instrumental Performance, Big Band
  - Count Basie for 88 Basie Street
- Best Jazz Fusion Performance, Vocal or Instrumental
  - Pat Metheny Group for First Circle
- Best Jazz Vocal Performance
  - Joe Williams for Nothin' but the Blues

=== Latin ===
- Best Latin Pop Performance
  - Plácido Domingo for Siempre en Mi Corazón—Always in My Heart
- Best Tropical Latin Performance
  - Eddie Palmieri for Palo Pa Rumba
- Best Mexican-American Performance
  - Sheena Easton & Luis Miguel for "Me Gustas Tal Como Eres"

=== Musical show ===
- Best Cast Show Album
  - Stephen Sondheim (composer & lyricist), Thomas Z. Shepard (producer) & the original cast for Sunday in the Park with George

=== Music video ===
- Best Video, Short Form
  - David Bowie for Jazzin' for Blue Jean
- Best Video Album
  - Michael Jackson for Making Michael Jackson's Thriller

=== Packaging and notes ===
- Best Album Package
  - Janet Perr (art director) for She's So Unusual performed by Cyndi Lauper
- Best Album Notes
  - Gunther Schuller & Martin Williams (notes writers) for Big Band Jazz performed by Paul Whiteman, Fletcher Henderson, Chick Webb, Tommy Dorsey, Count Basie, Benny Goodman & others

=== Pop ===
- Best Pop Vocal Performance, Female
  - Tina Turner for "What's Love Got to Do with It"
- Best Pop Vocal Performance, Male
  - Phil Collins for "Against All Odds (Take A Look At Me Now)"
- Best Pop Performance by a Duo or Group with Vocal
  - The Pointer Sisters for "Jump (For My Love)"
- Best Pop Instrumental Performance
  - Ray Parker Jr. for "Ghostbusters (Instrumental)"

=== Production and engineering ===
- Best Engineered Recording, Non-Classical
  - Humberto Gatica (engineer) for Chicago 17 performed by Chicago
- Best Engineered Recording, Classical
  - Paul Goodman (engineer), Leonard Slatkin (conductor) & the Saint Louis Symphony for Prokofiev: Symphony No. 5 in B Flat, Op. 100
- Producer of the Year, Non-Classical (Tie)
  - James Anthony Carmichael & Lionel Richie
  - David Foster
- Producer of the Year, Classical
  - Steven Epstein

=== R&B ===
- Best R&B Vocal Performance, Female
  - Chaka Khan for "I Feel for You"
- Best R&B Vocal Performance, Male
  - Billy Ocean for "Caribbean Queen"
- Best R&B Performance by a Duo or Group with Vocal
  - James Ingram & Michael McDonald for "Yah Mo B There"
- Best R&B Instrumental Performance
  - Herbie Hancock for "Sound System"
- Best Rhythm & Blues Song
  - Prince, songwriter for "I Feel for You" performed by Chaka Khan

=== Reggae ===
- Best Reggae Recording
  - Black Uhuru for Anthem

=== Rock ===
- Best Rock Vocal Performance, Female
  - Tina Turner for "Better Be Good to Me"
- Best Rock Vocal Performance, Male
  - Bruce Springsteen for "Dancing in the Dark"
- Best Rock Performance by a Duo or Group with Vocal
  - Prince and The Revolution for Purple Rain
- Best Rock Instrumental Performance
  - Yes for "Cinema"

=== Spoken ===
- Best Spoken Word or Non-musical Recording
  - Ben Kingsley for The Words of Gandhi
