= Into the Woods (original Broadway cast recording) =

Into the Woods – Original Cast Recording

Cast recording by the original cast
- Released: January 8, 1988 or January 19, 1988
- Label: RCA Victor

Into the Woods, subtitled A New Musical and Original Cast Recording, is an album containing a recording of Stephen Sondheim's musical Into the Woods made by its original 1987 Broadway cast. The album was released on January 8 or 19, 1988, by RCA Victor.

== Background ==
The album was produced by Jay David Saks.

According to the Show Music magazine, Stephen Sondheim "was very much part of the recording sessions" even if "he doesn't get an official credit on the album".

== Critical reception ==
Professional ratings
Review scores
Source	Rating
AllMusic	4/5 stars
Audio	(no rating)
Show Music	(no rating)

The Audio magazine rated the musical, along with "its immediate predecessor", as "[Stephen Sondheim's] most accessible work to date".

In a contemporary review for AllMusic, William Ruhlmann commends "the ensemble cast led by Bernadette Peters (as a witch)" and, in particular, Danielle Ferland (Little Red Riding Hood) and Robert Westenberg (the Wolf and Cinderella's Prince). He notes that the musical "succeeded in enchanting children [...] along with adults who understood the grown-up references" and points out how the album took advantage of the new CD format, with its longer playing time, and "used its 69-minute [length] to give a good sense of the show as a whole rather than being just a collection of musical highlights."

== Track listing ==
CD – RCA Victor 6796-2-RC

All lyrics are written by Stephen Sondheim; all music is composed by Stephen Sondheim.

No.	Title	Length
1.	"Prologue: Into the Woods"
2.	"Cinderella at the Grave"
3.	"Hello, Little Girl"
4.	"I Guess This Is Goodbye; Maybe They're Magic"
5.	"I Know Things Now"
6.	"A Very Nice Prince; First Midnight; Giants in the Sky"
7.	"Agony"
8.	"It Takes Two"
9.	"Stay with Me"
10.	"On the Steps of the Palace"
11.	"Ever After"
12.	"Act II Prologue: So Happy"
13.	"Agony"
14.	"Lament"
15.	"Any Moment; Moments in the Woods"
16.	"Your Fault; Last Midnight"
17.	"No More"
18.	"No One Is Alone"
19.	"Finale: Children Will Listen"

== Awards ==
Year	Award type	Categories	Results	Ref.
1989	Grammy Awards	Best Musical Cast Show Album	Won	
