= Phil Ramone =

South African-born American record producer (1934–2013)

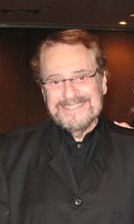
- Ramone in 2009

Background information
- Born: Philip Rabinowitz; January 5, 1934; South Africa
- Origin: Brooklyn, New York, U.S.
- Died: March 30, 2013 (aged 79) New York City, U.S.
- Occupations: Recording engineer; record producer; music executive; composer; songwriter; performer
- Instrument: Violin
- Years active: 1958–2013
- Labels: A & R Recording; Columbia; Warner Bros.; Verve; Hear Music; Casablanca
- Website: philramone.com (last version, archived at the Internet Archive)

Philip Rabinowitz (January 5, 1934 – March 30, 2013), better known as Phil Ramone, was a South African-born American recording engineer, record producer, violinist and composer, and co-founder of A & R recording studio. Its success led to expansion into several studios and a record production company. He was described by Billboard as "legendary", and the BBC as a "CD pioneer".

== Early life ==
Ramone was born in South Africa and grew up in Brooklyn, New York. As a child in South Africa, Ramone was a musical prodigy, beginning to play the violin at age three and performing for Princess Elizabeth at age 10. In the late 1940s, he trained as a classical violinist at the Juilliard School, where one of his classmates was Phil Woods. Ramone opened his own recording studio before he was 20. He became a naturalized citizen of the United States on December 14, 1953.

== Professional career ==
=== A & R Recording ===
In 1959, Ramone co-founded an independent New York City recording studio, A & R Recording, with business partner Jack Arnold. In the studio he quickly gained a reputation as a good sound engineer and music producer, in particular for his use of innovative technology. Among the performers whose music Ramone produced are Burt Bacharach, the Band, Bono, Laura Branigan, Ray Charles, Karen Carpenter, Chicago, Peter Cincotti, Natalie Cole, Celine Dion, Bob Dylan, Sheena Easton, Melissa Errico, Gloria Estefan, Aretha Franklin, Debbie Gibson, Clay Aiken, the Guess Who, Heatwave, Billie Hughes, Billy Joel, Elton John, Quincy Jones, Patricia Kaas, B.B. King, Lazarus, Julian Lennon, Shelby Lynne, Madonna, Barry Manilow, Richard Marx, Paul McCartney, George Michael, Cyndi Lauper, Liza Minnelli, Anne Murray, Olivia Newton-John, Sinéad O'Connor, Fito Páez, Luciano Pavarotti (including the Pavarotti and Friends Charity Concerts in Modena, Italy), Peter, Paul and Mary, June Pointer, André Previn, Jennifer Rush, Diane Schuur, Jon Secada, Michael Sembello, Carly Simon, Paul Simon, Frank Sinatra, Phoebe Snow, Dusty Springfield, Rod Stewart, Barbra Streisand, James Taylor, Frankie Valli, Dionne Warwick, Stevie Wonder, and Nikki Yanofsky. He also is credited with having recorded Marilyn Monroe's version of "Happy Birthday, Mr. President" to John F. Kennedy.

In 1972, management of A & R included Robert Gerics (general manager and studio manager), Nick Diminno (studio manager), and Irving Joel (chief engineer). The studios were located at 799 7th Avenue and 322 West 48th Street.

Ramone's early work in producing and engineering was with jazz artists, working on John Coltrane records and acting as engineer for the Getz/Gilberto album in 1963, for which he won his first Grammy. He transitioned during the 1960s to working with folk-rock, pop-rock, and R&B acts such as Peter, Paul and Mary, James Taylor, Aretha Franklin, and Bob Dylan, first primarily as an engineer, and later as a producer. He won his first production Grammy for his work on 1975's Still Crazy After All These Years by Paul Simon. He produced Billy Joel's 1977 album The Stranger and began a fruitful collaboration with Joel producing a string of hit albums throughout the rest of the 1970s and 1980s. In 1993, he produced Duets, Frank Sinatra's comeback album, a commercial hit that peaked at No. 2 on the Billboard Album Chart. During the rest of the 1990s, Ramone moved from production work to his primary role as an industry executive, serving as chairman of The Recording Academy, though he would still be involved in some studio work including several Broadway cast recordings, as well as helping produce, with Quincy Jones, the televised A Tribute to Brian Wilson in 2001.

=== Technical innovations ===
Ramone was a founding member of META (the Music & Engineering Technology Alliance).

October 1, 2025, marked the forty-third anniversary of the world's first commercially marketed compact disc. On that date in 1982, CBS/Sony released a digital compact disc of Billy Joel's 52nd Street in Japan, alongside Sony's CD player CDP-101.

Ramone introduced optical surround sound for movies. His book, Making Records: The Scenes Behind the Music, written with Chuck Granata, was released on October 9, 2007. Also in October 2007, Ramone produced a limited engagement performance of Richard Vetere's Be My Love: The Mario Lanza Story. The play was directed by Charles Messina and co-produced by Sonny Grosso. It premiered at The Tilles Center in Greenvale, New York.

=== Other professional activities ===
In addition to producing music, Ramone had numerous concert, film, Broadway, and television productions to his credit that include A Star Is Born, Walkabout, August Rush, Beyond the Sea, Flashdance, Ghostbusters, Little Shop of Horrors, Midnight Cowboy, On Her Majesty's Secret Service, Passion, Seussical, Simon and Garfunkel: The Concert In Central Park, Songwriters Hall of Fame Awards, The Score, VH1/BBC Party at the Palace: Queen’s Jubilee Concert and The Good Thief. A champion of music educational programs, Ramone served on the boards of the National Mentoring Partnership and Berklee College of Music.

=== Later work ===
On July 8, 2008, Columbia Records released The Stranger 30th Anniversary, which features interviews with Ramone. This box set includes a remastered version of the 1977 Billy Joel album The Stranger by Ramone. The following summer, Ramone produced Gershwin Across America, a tribute album to the music of George and Ira Gershwin. The album features Jewel, Jason Mraz, Darius Rucker, and Paul Simon. In 2011, Ramone worked with George Michael, during his 2011 Symphonica Tour. Also in 2011, Ramone produced the songs "You Were Meant for Me" and "I'm Coming Back" on Lalah Hathaway's album Where It All Begins. One of Ramone's final projects was as the producer of the rock band Chicago's 2011 holiday album, Chicago XXXIII: O Christmas Three.

== Personal life ==
Ramone was married to Karen Ichiuji-Ramone, with whom he had one son. Ramone had two sons from a prior marriage.

=== Death ===
Ramone was hospitalized in late February 2013 with an aortic aneurysm, and died on March 30, 2013, from complications involving the surgery related to it, at New York Presbyterian Hospital in Manhattan. He was aged 79.

== Awards ==
Grammy Award

Ramone was nominated for 34 Grammy Awards, winning 14 including a Technical Grammy Award in 2005 for a lifetime of innovative contributions to the recording industry.

- 1965 – Best Engineered Recording (non classical), for Getz/Gilberto
- 1970 – Best Musical Show Album for producing Promises, Promises
- 1976 – Album of the Year for producing Still Crazy After All These Years
- 1979 – Record of the Year for producing "Just the Way You Are"
- 1980 – Album of the Year for producing 52nd Street
- 1981 – Producer of the Year (non classical)
- 1984 – Best Album Of Original Score Written For A Motion Picture Or A Television Special, for Flashdance
- 1995 – Best Musical Show Album for producing Passion
- 2003 – Best Traditional Pop Vocal Album, for producing "Playin' With My Friends: Bennett Sings The Blues"
- 2005 – Album of the Year and Best Surround Sound Album for producing Genius Loves Company
- 2006 – Best Traditional Pop Vocal Album for producing The Art of Romance
- 2007 – Best Traditional Pop Vocal Album for producing Duets: An American Classic
- 2012 – Best Traditional Pop Vocal Album for producing Duets II

Other awards

- Ramone also won an Emmy Award in 1973 as the sound mixer for "Duke Ellington...We Love You Madly", a tribute to Duke Ellington broadcast on CBS.
- 1997 – American Eagle Award, National Music Council
- Ramone was awarded a Fellowship by the Audio Engineering Society in 2007.

Honorary degrees and collegiate appointments

Ramone was awarded honorary degrees by:

- Five Towns College
- Berklee College of Music
- Skidmore College

Ramone was a member of Berklee's board of trustees.
