= The Race to Urga =

- Music: Leonard Bernstein
- Lyrics: Stephen Sondheim
- Book: John Guare
- Basis: Bertolt Brecht's play The Exception and the Rule

The Race to Urga, later renamed A Pray by Blecht, is an unfinished musical adaptation of the Bertolt Brecht play The Exception and the Rule.

Collaboration on the production began in 1968, when Jerome Robbins asked John Guare to write the adaptation. Leonard Bernstein was to compose the music and Stephen Sondheim to write the lyrics. The musical was announced to open at Lincoln Center in January 1969, but Robbins left the production during cast auditions, and the project folded. Bernstein used themes from the work in Mass (1971), Arias and Barcarolles, and other works.

No cast album was produced, though a demo was recorded in 1968. Robbins returned to the show, still incomplete, as director and choreographer of an April 1987 workshop production at Lincoln Center.

== Synopsis ==
While never produced, the play featured a story within a story structure, with the musical numbers part of a television play of The Exception and the Rule. According to Sondheim's book Look, I Made A Hat, "The theatre would be a television studio and the play presented as a television play... The star of the TV play (intended to be Zero Mostel) would be white and the Guide and the Coolie would be black, and the growing paranoia of the star that the blacks were getting all the attention... would parallel the Merchant's paranoia."

== Workshop song list ==
- Prologue Marches
- Intro / In Seven Days Flat
- You're In Hann
- The Secret
- The Suspicion Song
- Coolie's Dilemma (lyrics by Jerry Leiber)
- Doors to Urga
- Get Your Ass In There
- Coolie's Prayer
- Number One
- The Zorba's Dance
