= Passion (original Broadway cast recording) =

Passion – Original Broadway Cast Recording

Cast recording by various artists
- Released: 1994
- Label: Broadway Angel

Passion, subtitled Original Broadway Cast Recording, is an album containing a recording of the 1994 musical Passion made by its original Broadway cast. The album was released on the Broadway Angel label in the same year.

== Background ==
The album was produced by Phil Ramone.

It was recorded at the Hit Factory in New York City.

== Critical reception ==
Professional ratings
Review scores
| Source | Rating |
|---|---|
| AllMusic | (no rating) |
| Billboard | (favorable) |

Billboard reviewed the album in the issue from September 17, 1994, writing: "All musical theater fans, and Sondheim followers in particular, will want this one."

In a contemporary review, AllMusic first notes the "lush orchestration by Sondheim's longtime collaborator, Jonathan Tunick", and then adds that, actually, the album added "twenty-six extra strings to the fifteen-piece orchestra originally used for the Broadway production", which "g[ave] the music a greater visceral strength".

== Chart performance ==
The album debuted at number 103 on the Billboard 200 chart, which remained its peak position.

On June 24, 1995, Billboard wrote that the album "ha[d] become [Sondheim's] fastest-selling title".

== Track listing ==
LP – Angel 55251 (Broadway Angel CDQ 7243 5 55251 23)

All lyrics are written by Stephen Sondheim; all music is composed by Stephen Sondheim.

| No. | Title | Artist(s) | Length |
|---|---|---|---|
| 1. | "Happiness" | Marin Mazzie, Jere Shea | 5:12 |
| 2. | "First Letter" | Marin Mazzie, Jere Shea, Tom Aldredge, Gregg Edelman | 1:11 |
| 3. | "Second Letter" | Marin Mazzie, Jere Shea, Donna Murphy, Gregg Edelman | 0:34 |
| 4. | "Third Letter" | Marin Mazzie, Jere Shea, Ensemble | 0:49 |
| 5. | "Fourth Letter" | Marin Mazzie | 0:51 |
| 6. | "I Read" | Donna Murphy, Jere Shea | 5:27 |
| 7. | "Transition" | Jere Shea, Ensemble | 0:42 |
| 8. | "Garden Sequence" | Tom Aldredge, Gregg Edelman, Donna Murphy, Jere Shea, Marin Mazzie | 5:14 |
| 9. | "Transition" | Jere Shea, Donna Murphy, Ensemble | 1:08 |
| 10. | "Trio" | Donna Murphy, Jere Shea, Marin Mazzie | 2:18 |
| 11. | "Transition" | Ensemble | 0:37 |
| 12. | "I Wish I Could Forget You" | Jere Shea, Donna Murphy | 3:15 |
| 13. | "Soldiers' Gossip" | Francis Ruivivar, George Dvorsky, Cris Groenendaal, William Parry | 1:10 |
| 14. | "Flashback" | Gregg Edelman, Donna Murphy, Linda Balgord, John Leslie Wolfe, Matthew Porretta, Juliet Lambert | 6:56 |
| 15. | "Sunrise Letter" | Marin Mazzie, Jere Shea, Donna Murphy | 1:43 |
| 16. | "Is This What You Call Love?" | Jere Shea | 1:34 |
| 17. | "Soldiers' Gossip" | Francis Ruivivar, Cris Groenendaal, George Dvorsky, William Parry | 1:10 |
| 18. | "Transition" | Cris Groenendaal | 0:37 |
| 19. | "Forty Days" | Marin Mazzie | 0:45 |
| 20. | "Loving You" | Jere Shea, Donna Murphy | 2:07 |
| 21. | "Transition" | Ensemble | 0:34 |
| 22. | "Soldiers' Gossip" | Francis Ruivivar, Cris Groenendaal, William Parry, George Dvorsky | 0:37 |
| 23. | "Farewell Letter" | Marin Mazzie, Jere Shea | 3:09 |
| 24. | "No One Has Ever Loved Me" | Jere Shea, Donna Murphy | 4:26 |
| 25. | "Finale" | Marin Mazzie, Matthew Porretta, Gregg Edelman, Jere Shea, Donna Murphy, Ensemble | 4:57 |

== Charts ==
| Chart (1994) | Peak position |
|---|---|
| US Billboard 200 | 103 |

== Awards ==
| Year | Award type | Categories | Results | Ref. |
|---|---|---|---|---|
| 1995 | Grammy Awards | Best Musical Show Album | Won | |
