= Finishing the Hat =

Book by Stephen Sondheim

Finishing the Hat: Collected Lyrics (1954–1981) with Attendant Comments, Principles, Heresies, Grudges, Whines, and Anecdotes
- Author: Stephen Sondheim

Finishing the Hat: Collected Lyrics (1954–1981) with Attendant Comments, Principles, Heresies, Grudges, Whines, and Anecdotes is a memoir by American musical theatre composer and lyricist Stephen Sondheim, first published by Knopf on October 29, 2010, running 444 pages. The second volume, Look, I Made a Hat: Collected Lyrics (1981–2011) with Attendant Comments, Amplifications, Dogmas, Harangues, Wafflings, Diversions and Anecdotes, was published by Knopf on November 22, 2011, running 480 pages. The two volumes were packaged together as Hat Box: The Collected Lyrics of Stephen Sondheim for a 2011 box set release. Spanning Sondheim's entire career in musical theater, film, and television, the collections detail the process of crafting these works alongside his opinion and self-critique.

== Finishing the Hat ==
The first volume contains Sondheim's lyrics from his first professionally staged show, Saturday Night (1954), through West Side Story, Gypsy, A Funny Thing Happened on the Way to the Forum, Anyone Can Whistle, Do I Hear a Waltz?, Company, Follies, A Little Night Music, The Frogs, Pacific Overtures, Sweeney Todd: The Demon Barber of Fleet Street, and ending with Merrily We Roll Along (1981), stopping just short of the Pulitzer Prize-winning Sunday in the Park with George (1984) which contains the song from which the title of the book is taken. The back of the book includes an appendix which lists the original Broadway production credits for the productions mentioned in the book.

While the book is not an autobiography, and much of it deals with Sondheim's lyrical technique (such as the use of perfect rhyme, proper stressing of syllables, avoiding redundancy), the comments and anecdotes mentioned in the subtitle often deal with his relationships with his collaborators, including Arthur Laurents, Jerome Robbins, George Furth, James Lapine and Leonard Bernstein, and with events important to the history of American musical theatre.

Additionally Sondheim offers sidebar critiques of some of the most renowned American lyricists of the first half of the 20th century, including Ira Gershwin, Irving Berlin, Lorenz Hart, Alan Jay Lerner, Frank Loesser, and his own mentor, Oscar Hammerstein II. Sondheim only discusses the works and styles of lyricists and composers who have died, for he states that he does not want to personally hurt anyone or ruin their reputation.

In the back of the second volume, Look, I Made a Hat, an appendix lists all of the lyrics and commentary that was accidentally left out of Finishing the Hat, including lyrics from Saturday Night, Anyone Can Whistle, Follies and A Little Night Music.

== Look, I Made a Hat ==
Cover of Look, I Made a Hat

The second volume covers the remainder of Sondheim's theatrical works, starting with Sunday in the Park with George, and includes Into the Woods, Assassins, Passion and several versions of Road Show. Also included are theatrical works that went unproduced or works Sondheim helped with in some extent throughout his career, including The Last Resorts, The World of Jules Feiffer, Hot Spot, The Mad Show, Illya Darling, A Pray by Blecht, the 1974 revival of Candide, Muscle, and Sondheim on Sondheim. The back of the book also includes an appendix which lists the original production credits for the productions mentioned in the book, as well as a selected discography that lists the recordings most frequently referenced in the book.

As with Finishing the Hat, Sondheim gives an in-depth look at his lyrical technique and relationships with collaborators. The book includes more critiques of deceased lyricists, including DuBose Heyward, Richard Wilbur, Howard Dietz, P. G. Wodehouse, Leo Robin, Johnny Mercer, John La Touche, Hugh Martin, Meredith Willson and Carolyn Leigh.

Sondheim also delves into his work in writing original songs for films both produced and unproduced, including films such as The Thing of It Is, The Seven-Per-Cent Solution, Dick Tracy (for which he won an Academy Award for Best Original Song for "Sooner or Later"), Singing Out Loud and The Birdcage.

Sondheim includes offerings from his work in television as well, providing lyrics and commentary on songs written for produced and unproduced television shows such as Kukla, Fran and Ollie, I Believe in You, The Fabulous Fifties, Do You Hear a Waltz? and Evening Primrose.

The book ends with Sondheim's inclusion of many small works he wrote throughout his career, such as political campaign songs, birthday songs for close friends, and collaborations from his college days.

== Reception ==
Finishing the Hat: Collected Lyrics (1954–1981) with Attendant Comments, Principles, Heresies, Grudges, Whines and Anecdotes received overall positive reviews. In The New York Times, Paul Simon called the book "a metaphor for that feeling of joy, the little squirt of dopamine hitting the brain when the artist creates a work of art". Randy Gener from American Theatre praised Sondheim's rigorous analysis of his own lyrics, calling the book "the best and most gorgeously produced book of its kind ever put together for a living composer".

Look, I Made a Hat: Collected Lyrics (1981–2011) with Attendant Comments, Amplifications, Dogmas, Harangues, Wafflings, Diversions and Anecdotes received more mixed reviews compared to the first volume. Brad Leithauser from The New York Times appreciated the inspirational nature of the book. He described this book as exhibiting "a donnish ease while blending amusement with edification". While writing an overall positive review, Joel Fishbane criticized unnecessary additions to the book, such as an expansive glossary and songs written as gifts to friends in Theatre Journal.
