= Sunday in the Park with George (original Broadway cast recording) =

Sunday in the Park with George – Original Cast Recording

Cast recording by various artists
- Released: 1984
- Label: Red Seal Digital

Sunday in the Park with George, subtitled A New Musical and Original Cast Recording, is an album containing a recording of the 1984 musical Sunday in the Park with George made by its original Broadway cast. The album was released on RCA's Red Seal Digital label in the same year.

== Background ==
The album was produced by Thomas Z. Shepard.

== Critical reception ==
Professional ratings
Review scores
Source	Rating
AllMusic	4.5/5 stars
Show Music	(favorable)
Saturday Review	(favorable)

The High Fidelity reviewed the album back in 1984, writing: "Sunday in the Park with George is a state-of-the-art musical, and here is a state-of-the-art recording of it. Don't be put off by the word 'musical': This is not a collection of vapid Jerry Herman show, brassily performed and harshly recorded. Rather Sunday in the Park with George is musical theater at its finest, a sensitive, witty play by James Lapine that is deepened and expanded by the words and music of Stephen Sondheim."

The Films in Review magazine called Sunday in the Park with George "one of the most unique experiences in modern theatre music".

Saturday Review reviewed the album as well, calling Sondheim "as accomplished a composer as anyone on the classical side of the tracks."

In a contemporary review for AllMusic, Bruce Eder wrote: "Clearly we're not talking about Gypsy or A Funny Thing Happened on the Way to the Forum here, in terms of entertainment [...], but Mandy Patinkin and Bernadette Peters turn in brilliant performances together on "Color and Light," "We Do Not Belong Together," "Move On," "Children and Art"; the entire ensemble excels in "Sunday," and his work on "Finishing the Hat" is worth the price of the CD by itself. The sound is clean, although the quiet passages could have been mastered at a slightly higher volume level."

== Chart performance ==
The album reached number 149 on Billboard's Top 200 Albums chart.

== Track listing ==
LP – RCA Victor 5042 (Red Seal Digital HBC1-5042)

All lyrics are written by Stephen Sondheim; all music is composed by Stephen Sondheim.

Side A
No.	Title	Note(s)	Length
1.	"[Untitled]"; 1. "Sunday in the Park with George"; 2. "No Life"; 3. "Color and Light"; 4. "Gossip"; 5. "The Day Off"; 6. "Everybody Loves Louis"; 7. "Finishing the Hat"; 8. "We Do Not Belong Together"	1. Bernadette Peters and Mandy Patinkin; 2. Charles Kimbrough and Dana Ivey; 3. Mandy Patinkin and Bernadette Peters; 4. Melanie Vaughan, Mary D'Arcy, Barbara Bryne, Judith Moore, William Parry; 5. Mandy Patinkin, Barbara Bryne, Judith Moore, Nancy Opel, Brent Spiner, Melanie Vaughan, Mary D'Arcy, Robert Westenberg, William Parry; 6. Bernadette Peters; 7. Mandy Patinkin; 8. Bernadette Peters and Mandy Patinkin	34:28

Side B
No.	Title	Note(s)	Length
1.	"Beautiful" "Sunday"	Barbara Bryne and Mandy Patinkin; Company	7:33
2.	"It's Hot Up Here"	Company	4:26
3.	"Chromolume #7" / "Putting It Together"	Judith Moore, Cris Groenendaal, Charles Kimbrough, Nancy Opel, Robert Westenberg, Dana Ivey, Mandy Patinkin, Kurt Knudson, Barbara Bryne	7:16
4.	"Children and Art"	Bernadette Peters and Mandy Patinkin	4:49
5.	"Lesson #8"	Mandy Patinkin	2:50
6.	"Move On"	Mandy Patinkin and Bernadette Peters	3:38
7.	"Sunday"	Company	3:51

== Charts ==
Chart (1984)	Peak position
US Billboard Top 200 Albums	149
US Billboard Top Classical Albums	5

== Awards ==
Year	Award type	Categories	Results	Ref.
1985	Grammy Awards	Best Cast Show Album	Won	
