= The Exception and the Rule =

Short play by German playwright Bertolt Brecht

The Exception and the Rule (German: Die Ausnahme und die Regel) is a short play by German playwright Bertolt Brecht and is one of several Lehrstücke (Teaching plays) he wrote around 1929/30. The objective of Brecht's Lehrstücke was that they be taken on tour and performed in schools or in factories to educate the masses about socialist politics.

The play itself is short, and lasts no longer than 60 minutes if performed in its entirety. It tells the story of a rich merchant, who must cross the fictional Yahi Desert to close an oil deal. During the trip the class differences between him and his working-class porter (or "coolie" as he is called in most English-language editions) are shown. As he becomes increasingly afraid of the desert, the merchant's brutality increases, and he feels terribly alone without police nearby to protect him. Eventually when the Merchant fires his guide, the porter and the Merchant himself get lost and the water supplies are running low. The Merchant mistakenly shoots the coolie, thinking he was being attacked, when he was in reality being offered some water the coolie still had left in his bottle.

Later, in a court room scene, the evidence of the murder is presented, and ultimately the Merchant is acquitted. The Judge concludes that the Merchant had every right to fear a potential threat from the coolie, and that he was justified in shooting the coolie in self-defense regardless of whether there was an actual threat, or whether the Merchant simply felt threatened.

Brecht intends to show the coolie as a victim caught in the gears of the merciless logic of class warfare. The play, due to its investigation of class differences between rich and poor, with the poor 'losing out', can be seen as arguing in favor of Brecht's Marxist politics. Brecht wishes to draw attention to the status quo, in which the working class is exploited by the ruling class, and show the absurdity of such an arrangement.

He hanshan ("The Confronted undershirt"), a Yuan Dynasty-era Chinese play, was the model for The Exception and the Rule. The scholar Antony Tatlow discovered this relationship through archival materials.

== See also ==
- The Race to Urga
