= A Little Night Music (original Broadway cast recording) =

Cast recording by the original Broadway cast
- Released: 1973
- Recorded: March 18, 1973
- Studios: Columbia 30th Street Studio, New York
- Label: Columbia Masterworks

An original Broadway cast recording of the 1973 musical A Little Night Music was made in the same year by Columbia. Released on LP, it peaked at number 94 on Billboard's Top LPs chart and won the Grammy in the "Best Score from the Original Cast Show Album" category.

== Background ==
Produced by Goddard Lieberson with Thomas Z. Shepard, the album was recorded in 1973 at the Columbia 30th Street Studio, New York.

== Critical reception ==
Professional ratings
Review scores
Source	Rating
AllMusic	4.5/5 stars
Billboard	(positive)

In a retrospective review on AllMusic, William Ruhlmann commends the recording, saying that it "captured the performances with amazing fidelity and immediacy for its time" and calling the LP "a marvel".

Back in 1963, Billboard picked the album for its "Radio action and pick LPs" section, calling the musical and the recording "unusually elegant adult entertainment" and singling out the song "Send in the Clowns" as the "best cut".

== Chart performance ==
The album reached number 94 on the Billboard's Top LPs chart.

== Track listing ==
LP – Columbia KS 32265

All lyrics are written by Stephen Sondheim; all music is composed by Stephen Sondheim.

Side 1
No.	Title	Artist(s)	Length
1.	"Overture" and "Night Waltz"	Benjamin Rayson, Teri Ralston, Barbara Lang, Gene Varrone, Beth Fowler
2.	"Now" "Later" "Soon"	Len Cariou; Mark Lambert; Victoria Mallory, Mark Lambert, Len Cariou
3.	"The Glamorous Life"	Judy Kahan, Glynis Johns, Hermione Gingold, Teri Ralston, Beth Fowler, Barbara Lang, Benjamin Rayson, Gene Varrone
4.	"Remember?"	Benjamin Rayson, Teri Ralston, Beth Fowler, Gene Varrone, Barbara Lang
5.	"You Must Meet My Wife"	Len Cariou and Glynis Johns
6.	"Liaisons"	Hermione Gingold

Side 2
No.	Title	Artist(s)	Length
1.	"In Praise of Women"	Laurence Guittard
2.	"Every Day a Little Death"	Patricia Elliott, Victoria Mallory
3.	"A Weekend in the Country"	Company
4.	"The Sun Won't Set"	Barbara Lang, Beth Fowler, Teri Ralston, Benjamin Rayson, Gene Varrone
5.	"It Would Have Been Wonderful"	Len Cariou, Laurence Guittard
6.	"Perpetual Anticipation"	Teri Ralston, Beth Fowler, Barbara Lang
7.	"Send in the Clowns"	Glynis Johns
8.	"The Miller's Son"	D. Jamin-Bartlett
9.	"Finale" (Reprise: "Send in the Clowns") and "Night Waltz"	Glynis Johns and Len Cariou

== Personnel ==
- Harold Hastings – musical direction
- Jonathan Tunick – orchestration

== Charts ==
Chart (1973)	Peak position
US Billboard Top LPs	94

== Awards ==
Year	Award type	Categories	Results	Ref.
1974	Grammy Awards	Best Score from the Original Cast Show Album	Won	
