= The Sondheim Review =

Defunct American music magazine

Front cover

The Sondheim Review was a quarterly magazine published in Chicago, United States, by Ray Birks starting in Summer 1994. Per its tagline, it was "Dedicated to the work of the musical theatre's foremost composer and lyricist," Stephen Sondheim. It was originally edited by Paul Salsini; starting in 2004, Cincinnati theatre critic Rick Pender became its managing editor; its editorial board included Chicago theatre columnist John Olson, drama critic and university professor Eric Grode, university professor Paul M. Puccio, and theater journalist Russell M. Dembin. Sondheim wrote occasional short items for the magazine, although he was not formally connected with the magazine.

The Sondheim Review ceased publication with the Spring 2016 issue (Volume 22, issue 2). The associated website is defunct, and many subscribers did not receive refunds from the publisher for their 2016–2017 subscription season. At present, the website www.sondheimreview.com uses an invalid security certificate that expired on December 19, 2016.

The Sondheim Review maintained a low-activity website that included one free article from each issue and a list of upcoming Sondheim productions primarily in the United States and Canada. The magazine had subscribers in more than 25 countries, as Sondheim's work is widely acclaimed and respected, even in non-English-speaking countries.

== Everything Sondheim ==
Rick Pender, former Managing Editor of the Review, established the website called Everything Sondheim in 2016, envisioned as a "go-to source of news, information, commentary and analysis for musical theater enthusiasts who admire the works and career of composer and lyricist Stephen Sondheim". Operation of Everything Sondheim ceased on December 31, 2017 as the "anticipated financial model did not succeed".

On January 4, 2018 it was announced that Signature Theatre in Arlington, Virginia, had acquired EverythingSondheim.org. Signature's Artistic Director Eric Schaeffer plans to "continue to publish new and original content, including articles, videos, production listings, puzzles, quizzes and more starting in Winter 2018”.
