= Stephen Sondheim =

American composer and lyricist (1930–2021)

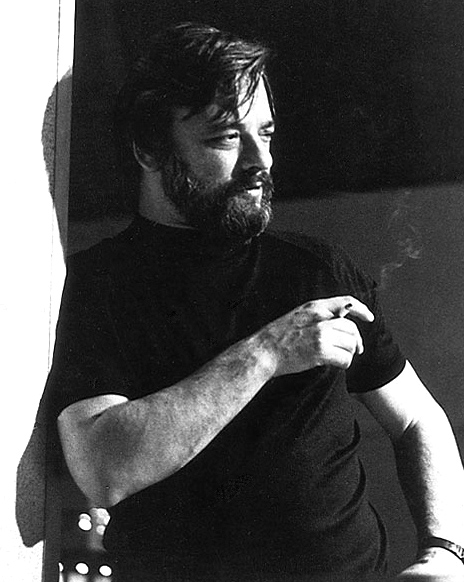
- Sondheim in 1970
- Born: March 22, 1930; New York City, U.S.
- Died: November 26, 2021 (aged 91); Roxbury, Connecticut, U.S.
- Education: Williams College (BA)
- Occupations: Composer; lyricist
- Years active: 1952–2021
- Spouse: Jeffrey Romley (m. 2017)
- Awards: Full list
- Musical career
- Genre: Musical theater

Stephen Joshua Sondheim (/ˈsɒndhaɪm/; March 22, 1930 – November 26, 2021) was an American composer and lyricist. Considered one of the most important figures in 20th-century theater, he is credited with reinventing the American musical. He received numerous accolades, including eight Tony Awards, eight Grammy Awards and five Olivier Awards. He was inducted into the American Theater Hall of Fame in 1982 and awarded the Kennedy Center Honor in 1993 and the Presidential Medal of Freedom in 2015.

Sondheim was mentored by Oscar Hammerstein II and later frequently collaborated with Harold Prince and James Lapine. His Broadway musicals tackle themes that range beyond the genre's traditional subjects, addressing darker elements of the human experience. His music and lyrics are characterized by their complexity, sophistication and ambivalence.

Sondheim started by writing the lyrics for West Side Story (1957) and Gypsy (1959). He transitioned to writing both music and lyrics, including five works that earned the Tony Award for Best Musical: A Funny Thing Happened on the Way to the Forum (1962), Company (1970), A Little Night Music (1973), Sweeney Todd: The Demon Barber of Fleet Street (1979) and Passion (1994). He is also known for Follies (1971), Pacific Overtures (1976), Merrily We Roll Along (1981), Into the Woods (1987), and Assassins (1990). Sunday in the Park with George (1984) won the Pulitzer Prize for Drama, one of the few musicals so honored.

Theaters are named after him both on Broadway and in the West End of London. He won the Academy Award for Best Original Song for "Sooner or Later" from Dick Tracy (1990). Many of his works have been adapted for film, including West Side Story (in 1961 and 2021), Gypsy (1962), A Funny Thing Happened on the Way to the Forum (1966), A Little Night Music (1977), Sweeney Todd: The Demon Barber of Fleet Street (2007), and Into the Woods (2014). He published two books involving his collected lyrics, starting with Finishing the Hat.

== Early life and education ==
Sondheim was born on March 22, 1930, into a Jewish family in New York City, the son of Etta Janet ("Foxy"; née Fox; 1897–1992) and Herbert Sondheim (1895–1966). His paternal grandparents, Isaac and Rosa, were German Jews, and his maternal grandparents, Joseph and Bessie, were Lithuanian Jews from Vilnius. His father manufactured dresses designed by his mother. Sondheim grew up on the Upper West Side of Manhattan, where he began taking piano lessons at age 7. After his parents divorced, he lived on a farm near Doylestown, Pennsylvania. The only child of affluent parents living in the San Remo at 145 Central Park West, he was described in Stephen Sondheim: A Life as an isolated, emotionally neglected child. When he lived in New York City, Sondheim attended the Ethical Culture Fieldston School. He spent several summers at Camp Androscoggin, where Tom Lehrer was a counselor.

Sondheim traced his interest in musical theater to Very Warm for May, which he saw when he was nine. "The curtain went up and revealed a piano", Sondheim recalled. "A butler took a duster and brushed it up, tinkling the keys. I thought that was thrilling." When Sondheim was about ten years old (around the time of his parents' divorce), he formed a close friendship with James Hammerstein, son of lyricist and playwright Oscar Hammerstein II, who were neighbors in Bucks County. The elder Hammerstein became Sondheim's surrogate father, influencing him profoundly and developing his love of musical theater. Sondheim met Hal Prince, who later directed many of his shows, at the opening of South Pacific, Hammerstein's musical with Richard Rodgers. Of the premiere of Rodgers and Hammerstein's Carousel, he said: "It was a seminal experience of my life. I was completely overwhelmed."

Sondheim's mother sent him to New York Military Academy in 1940. From 1942 to 1947, he attended George School, a private Quaker preparatory school in Bucks County, Pennsylvania, where, in 1945, he wrote his first musical, By George.

=== Mentorship by Oscar Hammerstein II ===
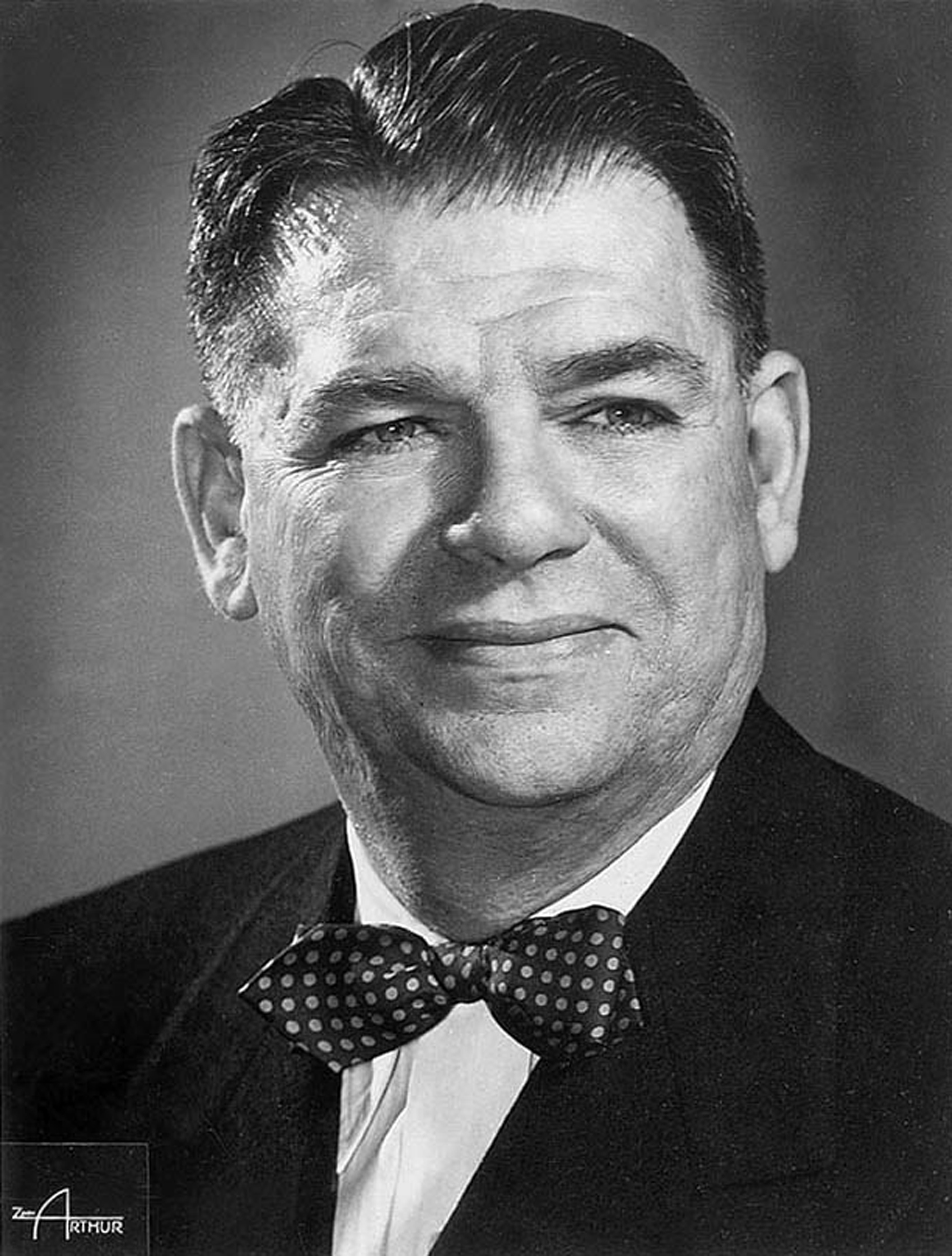
Oscar Hammerstein c. 1940

By George was a success among Sondheim's peers and buoyed his self-esteem. When he asked Hammerstein to evaluate it, Hammerstein called it "the worst thing I've ever read", adding: "I didn't say that it was untalented, I said it was terrible. And if you want to know why it's terrible, I'll tell you." They spent the rest of the day going over the musical, and Sondheim said, "In that afternoon I learned more about songwriting and the musical theater than most people learn in a lifetime."

Hammerstein designed a course for Sondheim on writing a musical. He had him write four musicals, each with one of the following conditions:

- Based on a play he admired; Sondheim chose George S. Kaufman and Marc Connelly's Beggar on Horseback (which became All That Glitters)
- Based on a play he liked but thought flawed; Sondheim chose Maxwell Anderson's High Tor
- Based on an existing novel or short story not previously dramatized, which became his unfinished version of Mary Poppins (Bad Tuesday, unrelated to the musical film and stage play scored by the Sherman Brothers)
- An original, which became Climb High

None of the "assignment" musicals was produced professionally. High Tor and Mary Poppins have never been produced: the rights holder for the original High Tor refused permission (though a musical version by Arthur Schwartz was produced for television in 1956), and Mary Poppins was unfinished. Sondheim learned "that art is work and not inspiration, that invention comes with craft". Sondheim was a gofer for Rodgers and Hammerstein's Allegro: "Somebody said to me once, 'Your whole life has been fixing Allegro. That's what I've been doing. I've been trying to fix Allegro all my life."

=== Education ===
After graduating from high school, Sondheim attended Williams College, where he initially majored in mathematics but switched to music after taking an elective during his first year. At Williams, he participated in Cap & Bells, the college's student-run theater group, and wrote his first two full musicals. Sondheim was inducted into Phi Beta Kappa and received the Hubbard Hutchinson Prize, which included a two-year fellowship to study music. His first teacher there was Robert Barrow, of whom Sondheim said:

everybody hated him because he was very dry, and I thought he was wonderful because he was very dry. And Barrow made me realize that all my romantic views of art were nonsense. I had always thought an angel came down and sat on your shoulder and whispered in your ear "dah-dah-dah-DUM." It never occurred to me that art was something worked out. And suddenly it was skies opening up. As soon as you find out what a leading tone is, you think, Oh my God. What a diatonic scale is—Oh my God! The logic of it. And, of course, what that meant to me was: Well, I can do that. Because you just don't know. You think it's a talent, you think you're born with this thing. What I've found out and what I believed is that everybody is talented. It's just that some people get it developed and some don't.

Sondheim told Meryle Secrest: "I just wanted to study composition, theory, and harmony without the attendant musicology that comes in graduate school. But I knew I wanted to write for the theater, so I wanted someone who did not disdain theater music." Barrow suggested that Sondheim study with Milton Babbitt, whom Sondheim called "a frustrated show composer" with whom he formed "a perfect combination". When they met, Babbitt was working on a musical for Mary Martin based on the myth of Helen of Troy. The two met once a week in New York City for four hours. (At the time, Babbitt was teaching at Princeton University.) According to Sondheim, they spent the first hour dissecting Rodgers and Hart or George Gershwin or studying Babbitt's favorites (Buddy DeSylva, Lew Brown, and Ray Henderson). They then proceeded to analyzing other works (such as Mozart's Jupiter Symphony) in the same way. Fascinated by mathematics, Babbitt and Sondheim studied songs by a variety of composers (especially Jerome Kern). Sondheim told Secrest that Kern could "develop a single motif through tiny variations into a long and never boring line and his maximum development of the minimum of material". He said of Babbitt, "I am his maverick, his one student who went into the popular arts with all his serious artillery". A member of the Beta Theta Pi fraternity, he graduated magna cum laude in 1950.

"A few painful years of struggle" followed, when Sondheim auditioned songs, lived in his father's dining room to save money, and spent time in Hollywood writing for the TV series Topper. He devoured 1940s and 1950s films, and called cinema his "basic language"; his film knowledge got him through The $64,000 Question contestant tryouts. Sondheim disliked movie musicals, favoring films like Citizen Kane, The Grapes of Wrath and A Matter of Life and Death: "Studio directors like Michael Curtiz and Raoul Walsh ... were heroes of mine. They went from movie to movie to movie, and every third movie was good and every fifth movie was great. There wasn't any cultural pressure to make art".

Screenwriters Julius and Philip Epstein's Front Porch in Flatbush, unproduced at the time, was being shopped around by designer and producer Lemuel Ayers. Ayers approached Frank Loesser and another composer; both turned him down. Ayers and Sondheim met as ushers at a wedding, and Ayers commissioned Sondheim for three songs for the show; Julius Epstein flew in from California and hired Sondheim, who worked with him in California for four or five months. After eight auditions for backers, half the money needed was raised. The show, retitled Saturday Night, was intended to open during the 1954–55 Broadway season, but Ayers died of leukemia in his early forties. The production rights transferred to his widow, Shirley, and due to her inexperience the show did not continue as planned; it opened off-Broadway in 2000. Sondheim later said, "I don't have any emotional reaction to Saturday Night at all—except fondness. It's not bad stuff for a 23-year-old. There are some things that embarrass me so much in the lyrics—the missed accents, the obvious jokes. But I decided, leave it. It's my baby pictures. You don't touch up a baby picture—you're a baby!"

Hammerstein died of stomach cancer on August 23, 1960, aged 65. Sondheim later recalled that Hammerstein had given him a portrait of himself. Sondheim asked him to inscribe it, and said later of the request that it was "weird... it's like asking your father to inscribe something." Reading the inscription ("For Stevie, My Friend and Teacher"), an emotional Sondheim said, "That describes Oscar better than anything I could say."

== Career ==
=== 1954–1959: Lyrics ===
==== West Side Story ====
Burt Shevelove invited Sondheim to a party where he saw a familiar face, Arthur Laurents, who had seen one of the auditions of Saturday Night. Laurents told him he was working on a musical version of Romeo and Juliet with Leonard Bernstein, but they needed a lyricist; Betty Comden and Adolph Green, who were supposed to write the lyrics, were under contract in Hollywood. He said that although he was not a big fan of Sondheim's music, he enjoyed the lyrics from Saturday Night and he could audition for Bernstein. The next day, Sondheim met and played for Bernstein, who said he would let him know. Sondheim wanted to write music and lyrics; he consulted with Hammerstein, who said, "Look, you have a chance to work with very gifted professionals on a show that sounds interesting, and you could always write your own music eventually. My advice would be to take the job." West Side Story, directed by Jerome Robbins, opened in 1957 and ran for 732 performances. Sondheim expressed dissatisfaction with his lyrics, saying they did not always fit the characters and were sometimes too consciously poetic. Initially Bernstein was also credited as a co-writer of the lyrics, but he later offered Sondheim solo credit, as Sondheim had essentially done all of them. The New York Times review did not mention the lyrics. Sondheim described the division of the royalties, saying that Bernstein received 3% and he received 1%. Bernstein suggested evening the percentage at 2% each, but Sondheim refused because he was satisfied with just getting the credit. Sondheim later said he wished "someone stuffed a handkerchief in my mouth because it would have been nice to get that extra percentage". The show was revived on Broadway in 1960, 1964, 1980, 2009, and 2020.

After West Side Story opened, Shevelove lamented the lack of "lowbrow comedy" on Broadway and mentioned a possible musical based on Roman comedies. Sondheim was interested in the idea and called a friend, Larry Gelbart, to co-write the script. The show went through a number of drafts and was interrupted briefly by Sondheim's next project.

==== Gypsy ====
In 1959, Laurents and Robbins approached Sondheim for a musical version of Gypsy Rose Lee's memoir after Irving Berlin and Cole Porter turned it down. Sondheim agreed, but Ethel Merman—cast as Mama Rose—had just finished Happy Hunting, a flop with an unknown composer (Harold Karr) and lyricist (Matt Dubey). Although Sondheim wanted to write the music and lyrics, Merman refused to let another first-time composer write for her and demanded that Jule Styne write the music. Concerned that writing lyrics again would pigeonhole him as a lyricist, Sondheim called his mentor for advice. Hammerstein told him he should take the job, because writing a vehicle for a star would be a good learning experience. Sondheim agreed; Gypsy opened on May 21, 1959, and ran for 702 performances. Notable songs include "Everything's Coming Up Roses". The show was revived on Broadway in 1974, 1989, 2003, 2008, and 2024.

=== 1962–1966: Music and lyrics ===
==== A Funny Thing Happened on the Way to the Forum ====
The first Broadway show for which Sondheim wrote both music and lyrics was A Funny Thing Happened on the Way to the Forum, starring Zero Mostel. It opened in 1962 and ran for 964 performances. The book, based on farces by Plautus, was by Burt Shevelove and Larry Gelbart. The show won six Tony Awards, including Best Musical and had the longest Broadway run of any show for which Sondheim wrote both music and lyrics. It was adapted as a film by Richard Lester, with Mostel reprising his stage role, and received Broadway revivals in 1972 and 1996.

==== Anyone Can Whistle ====
Sondheim had participated in three straight hits, but his next show—1964's Anyone Can Whistle—was a nine-performance bomb, although it introduced Angela Lansbury to musical theater.

==== Do I Hear a Waltz? ====
Do I Hear a Waltz?, based on Laurents's 1952 play The Time of the Cuckoo, was intended as another Rodgers and Hammerstein musical with Mary Martin in the lead. A new lyricist was needed, and Laurents and Mary Rodgers, Rodgers's daughter, asked Sondheim to fill in. Although Richard Rodgers and Sondheim agreed that the original play did not lend itself to musicalization, they began writing a musical version. The project had many difficulties, including Rodgers's alcoholism. Sondheim later called it the one project he truly regretted writing, given that the reasons he wrote it—as a favor to Mary, as a favor to Hammerstein, as an opportunity to work again with Laurents, and as an opportunity to make money—were not reasons to write a musical. He then decided to work only when he could write both music and lyrics.

Sondheim asked author and playwright James Goldman to join him as bookwriter for a new musical inspired by a gathering of former Ziegfeld girls, initially titled The Girls Upstairs.

==== Evening Primrose and other work ====
In 1966, Sondheim semi-anonymously provided lyrics for "The Boy From...", a parody of "The Girl from Ipanema" in the off-Broadway revue The Mad Show. The song was credited to "Esteban Río Nido", Spanish for "Stephen River Nest", and in the show's playbill the lyrics were credited to "Nom De Plume". That year Goldman and Sondheim hit a creative wall on The Girls Upstairs, and Goldman asked Sondheim about writing a TV musical. The result was Evening Primrose, with Anthony Perkins and Charmian Carr. Written for the anthology series ABC Stage 67 and produced by Hubbell Robinson, it was broadcast on November 16, 1966. According to Sondheim and director Paul Bogart, the musical was written only because Goldman needed money for rent. The network disliked the title and Sondheim's alternative, A Little Night Music.

After Sondheim finished Evening Primrose, Jerome Robbins asked him to adapt Bertolt Brecht's The Measures Taken despite Sondheim's general dislike of Brecht's work. Robbins wanted to adapt Brecht's The Exception and the Rule and asked John Guare to adapt the book. Leonard Bernstein had not written for the stage in some time, and his contract as conductor of the New York Philharmonic was ending. Sondheim was invited to Robbins's house in the hope that Guare would convince him to write the lyrics for a musical version of The Exception and the Rule; according to Robbins, Bernstein would not work without Sondheim. When Sondheim agreed, Guare asked: "Why haven't you all worked together since West Side Story?" Sondheim answered, "You'll see". Guare said that working with Sondheim was like being with an old college roommate, and he depended on him to "decode and decipher their crazy way of working"; Bernstein worked only after midnight, and Robbins only in the early morning. Bernstein's score, which was supposed to be light, was influenced by his need to make a musical statement. Stuart Ostrow, who worked with Sondheim on The Girls Upstairs, agreed to produce the musical, initially titled A Pray by Blecht, then The Race to Urga. An opening night was scheduled, but during auditions Robbins asked to be excused for a moment. When he did not return, a doorman said he had gotten into a limousine to go to John F. Kennedy International Airport. Bernstein burst into tears and said, "It's over". Sondheim later said of this experience: "I was ashamed of the whole project. It was arch and didactic in the worst way." He wrote one and a half songs and threw them away, the only time he ever did that. Eighteen years later, Sondheim refused Bernstein's and Robbins's request to retry the show.

The film rights to Gypsy allowed Sondheim to afford to live in a Turtle Bay, Manhattan brownstone. Ten years later, he heard a knock on the door. His neighbor, Katharine Hepburn, was in "bare feet—this angry, red-faced lady" and told him, "You have been keeping me awake all night!" (she was practicing for her musical debut in Coco). "I remember asking Hepburn why she didn't just call me, but she claimed not to have my phone number. My guess is that she wanted to stand there in her bare feet, suffering for her art".

=== 1970–1981: Collaborations with Hal Prince ===
==== Company ====
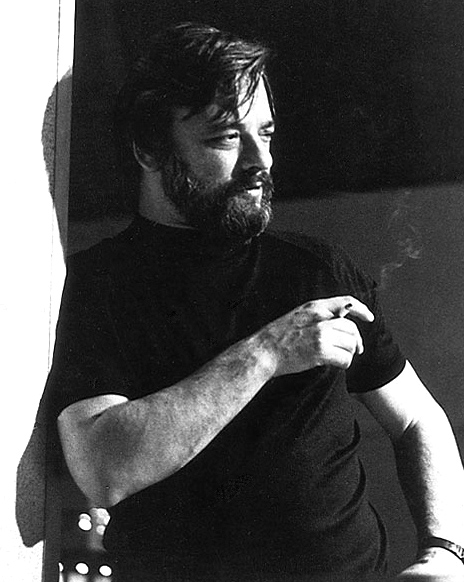
Sondheim, c. 1976

After Do I Hear a Waltz?, Sondheim devoted himself to writing both music and lyrics for the theater—and in 1970, he began a collaboration with director Harold Prince resulting in a body of work that is considered one of the high water marks of musical theater history, with critic Howard Kissel writing that the duo had set "Broadway's highest standards".

Sondheim's first show directed by Prince was Company (1970). A show about a single man and his married friends, Company (with a book by George Furth) lacks a straightforward plot, instead centering on themes such as marriage and the difficulty of making an emotional connection with another person. It opened on April 26, 1970, at the Alvin Theatre, running for 705 performances after seven previews, and won Tony Awards for Best Music, Best Lyrics, and Best Musical. The original cast included Dean Jones, Elaine Stritch, and Charles Kimbrough. Popular songs include "Company", "The Little Things You Do Together", "Sorry-Grateful", "You Could Drive a Person Crazy", "Another Hundred People", "Getting Married Today", "Side by Side", "The Ladies Who Lunch", and "Being Alive". Walter Kerr praised the production, performances, and score, writing, "Sondheim has never written a more sophisticated, more pertinent, or—this is the surprising thing in the circumstances—more melodious score".

Documentarian D. A. Pennebaker captured the making of the original cast recording in Original Cast Album: Company (1970). Stritch, Sondheim, and producer Thomas Z. Shepard are featured prominently. Company was revived on Broadway in 1995, 2006 and 2020/2021 (the last revival began previews in March 2020, but shut down before resuming in November 2021 due to the ongoing COVID-19 pandemic; in this revival, the main character was a woman, Bobbie, portrayed by Katrina Lenk). The 2006 and 2021 productions won the Tony Award for Best Revival of a Musical.

==== Follies ====
Follies (1971), with a book by James Goldman, opened on April 4, 1971, at the Winter Garden Theatre and ran for 522 performances after 12 previews. The plot centers on a reunion, in a crumbling Broadway theater scheduled for demolition, of performers in Weismann's Follies, a musical revue based on the Ziegfeld Follies, that played in the theater between the world wars. The production also featured choreography and co-direction by Michael Bennett, who later created A Chorus Line. Frank Rich wrote, "Sondheim has composed his richest score (and also his most difficult)", adding, "Prince and Bennett have not missed out on any opportunities in their complex staging, and Boris Aronson has designed a set that in itself evokes the substance of the show it houses." The original production starred Dorothy Collins, John McMartin, Alexis Smith, and Gene Nelson. It includes the songs "Broadway Baby", "I'm Still Here", "Could I Leave You?", and "Losing My Mind". The score is a pastiche of earlier show tunes. It was nominated for 11 Tony Awards and won 7, including Best Original Score. The show was revived on Broadway in 2001 and 2011. Martin Gottfried wrote, "Follies is truly awesome and, if it is not consistently good, it is always great."

==== A Little Night Music ====
A Little Night Music (1973), based on Ingmar Bergman's Smiles of a Summer Night and with a score primarily in waltz time, was among Sondheim's greatest commercial successes. Time magazine called it his "most brilliant accomplishment to date". The original cast included Glynis Johns, Len Cariou, Hermione Gingold and Judy Kahan. The show opened on Broadway at the Shubert Theatre on February 25, 1973 and ran for 601 performances after 12 previews. Clive Barnes wrote, "A Little Night Music is soft on the ears, easy on the eyes, and pleasant on the mind. It is less than brash, but more than brassy, and it should give a lot of pleasure. It is the remembrance of a few things past, and all to the sound of a waltz and the understanding smile of a memory. Good God!—[an] adult musical!"

The production was nominated for 12 Tony Awards and won 6, including Best Original Score and Best Musical. "Send in the Clowns" was a hit for Judy Collins and became Sondheim's best-known song. It has since been covered by Frank Sinatra, Barbra Streisand, and Judi Dench. It was revived on Broadway in 2009 in a production starring Catherine Zeta-Jones and Angela Lansbury.

==== Pacific Overtures ====
Pacific Overtures (1976), with a book by John Weidman, was one of Sondheim's most unconventional efforts: it explored the westernization of Japan, and was originally presented in a mock-Kabuki style. The show received mixed reviews and closed after 193 performances. It was revived on Broadway in 2004.

==== Sweeney Todd ====
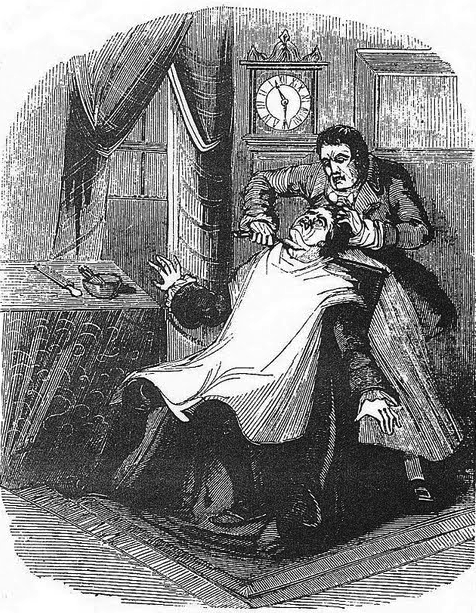
1850 depiction of Sweeney Todd

Sweeney Todd: The Demon Barber of Fleet Street (1979), with a score by Sondheim and a book by Hugh Wheeler, is based on Christopher Bond's 1973 stage play derived from the Victorian original. It follows a barber with too many customers and a restaurateur without enough meat, who find a common solution to their problem. Popular songs from it include "The Ballad of Sweeney Todd", "The Worst Pies in London", "Pretty Women", "A Little Priest", "Not While I'm Around", "By the Sea", and "Johanna". Richard Eder wrote: "Mr. Sondheim's lyrics can be endlessly inventive. There is a hugely amusing recitation of the attributes given by the different professions—priest, lawyer, and so on—to the pies they contribute to. At other times the lyrics have a black, piercing poetry to them. His score is extraordinary. From the pounding 'Sweeney Todd Ballad,' to a lovely discovery theme given to Todd's young friend, Anthony, in various appearances, to the most beautiful 'Green Finch and Linnet Bird' sung by Joanna, Todd's daughter, and through many others, Mr. Sondheim gives us all manner of musical strength." T. E. Kalem called it "one giant step for vegetarianism".

It was nominated for nine Tony Awards and won eight, including Best Original Score, Best Actress, Best Actor, and Best Musical. The original production starred Angela Lansbury and Len Cariou and featured Victor Garber, Edmund Lyndeck, and Ken Jennings. Lansbury performed alongside George Hearn in the Los Angeles production, which was filmed and shown on PBS as part of Masterpiece Theatre. It later earned five Primetime Emmy Award nominations. It has been revived on Broadway in 1989, 2005, and 2023. The 2023 production starred Josh Groban, Annaleigh Ashford, Jordan Fisher, and Gaten Matarazzo. Tim Burton's film adaptation starred Johnny Depp, Helena Bonham Carter, and Alan Rickman.

==== Merrily We Roll Along ====
Merrily We Roll Along (1981), with a book by George Furth, is based on the 1934 play by George S. Kaufman and Moss Hart. Like the play, it employs reverse chronology. The show was not the success his earlier Prince collaborations had been: after a chaotic series of preview performances, it opened to widely negative reviews, and closed after a run of less than two weeks. Martin Gottfried wrote, "Sondheim had set out to write traditional songs ... But [despite] that there is nothing ordinary about the music." Frank Rich wrote: "Mr. Sondheim has given this evening a half-dozen songs that are crushing and beautiful—that soar and linger and hurt. But the show that contains them is a shambles."

Sondheim later said: "Did I feel betrayed? I'm not sure I would put it like that. What did surprise me was the feeling around the Broadway community—if you can call it that, though I guess I will for lack of a better word—that they wanted Hal and me to fail." Due to the high quality of Sondheim's score, Sondheim and Furth continued to revise the show. A documentary on the show and its aftermath, Best Worst Thing That Ever Could Have Happened, directed by Merrily cast member Lonny Price and produced by Bruce David Klein, Kitt Lavoie, and Ted Schillinger, premiered at the New York Film Festival in 2016. A film adaptation of Merrily We Roll Along, directed by Richard Linklater, began production in 2019 and is planned to continue for the next two decades to allow the actors to age in real time. An off-Broadway revival starring Jonathan Groff, Daniel Radcliffe, and Lindsay Mendez ran from November 2022 to January 2023 at the New York Theatre Workshop; it moved to Broadway in fall 2023. In 2024, Merrily won Tony Awards for Best Revival of a Musical, Best Performance by an Actor in a Leading Role in a Musical (Groff), Best Performance by an Actor in a Featured Role in a Musical (Radcliffe), and Best Orchestrations (Jonathan Tunick).

Merrily's failure deeply affected Sondheim; he was ready to quit theater and make movies, design video games or write mysteries: "I wanted to find something to satisfy myself that does not involve Broadway and dealing with all those people who hate me and hate Hal." After Merrily, Sondheim and Prince did not collaborate again until their 2003 production of Bounce.

=== 1984–1994: Collaborations with James Lapine ===
==== Sunday in the Park with George ====
Sondheim decided "that there are better places to start a show" and found a new collaborator in James Lapine after he saw Lapine's Twelve Dreams off-Broadway in 1981: "I was discouraged, and I don't know what would have happened if I hadn't discovered Twelve Dreams at the Public Theatre"; Lapine has a taste "for the avant-garde and for visually oriented theater in particular". Their first collaboration was Sunday in the Park with George (1984), with Sondheim's score evoking Georges Seurat's pointillism. Mandy Patinkin starred as Seurat as he paints his masterpiece Sunday Afternoon on the Island of La Grande Jatte, and Bernadette Peters played his mistress, Dot. Frank Rich wrote: "Mr. Sondheim and Mr. Lapine have created an audacious, haunting and, in its own intensely personal way, touching work. Even when it fails—as it does on occasion—Sunday in the Park is setting the stage for even more sustained theatrical innovations yet to come." Sondheim and Lapine won the 1985 Pulitzer Prize for Drama. It was revived on Broadway in 2008, and again in a limited run in 2017.

==== Into the Woods ====
Lapine and Sondheim worked on Into the Woods (1987), an amalgam of several fairy tales from the Brothers Grimm. Frank Rich wrote, "The characters of Into the Woods may be figures from children's literature, but their journey is the same painful, existential one taken by so many adults in Sondheim musicals past."

Although Sondheim has been called the first composer to bring rap music to Broadway (with the Witch in the Into the Woods Prologue), he attributed its first appearance to Meredith Willson's "Rock Island" from The Music Man (1957). Into the Woods was revived on Broadway in 2002 and in 2022 at the St. James Theatre.

==== Passion ====
Sondheim's and Lapine's last collaboration on a musical was the rhapsodic Passion (1994), adapted from Ettore Scola's Passione D'Amore. With a run of 280 performances, Passion was the shortest-running show to win Best Musical.

=== 1990–2021: Later work ===
==== Assassins ====
Assassins opened off-Broadway at Playwrights Horizons on December 18, 1990, with a book by John Weidman. The show explored, in revue form, a group of historical figures who tried (with varying success) to assassinate the President of the United States. The musical closed on February 16, 1991, after 73 performances. The Los Angeles Times reported the show "has been sold out since previews began, reflecting the strong appeal of Sondheim's work among the theater crowd." Frank Rich wrote, "Assassins will have to fire with sharper aim and fewer blanks if it is to shoot to kill." Assassins was eventually staged on Broadway in 2004. In Look, I Made a Hat: Collected Lyrics (1981–2011), Sondheim wrote, "Assassins has only one moment I'd like to improve. ... Otherwise, as far as I'm concerned, the show is perfect. Immodest that may sound, but I'm ready to argue it with anybody."

==== Road Show ====
Sondheim and Weidman reunited during the late 1990s for Wise Guys, a musical comedy based on the lives of colorful businessmen Addison and Wilson Mizner. A Broadway production starring Nathan Lane and Victor Garber, directed by Sam Mendes and planned for spring 2000, was delayed. Renamed Bounce in 2003, the show premiered at the Goodman Theatre in Chicago and the Kennedy Center in Washington, D.C., in a production directed by Harold Prince, his first collaboration with Sondheim since 1981. Poor reviews prevented Bounce from reaching Broadway, but a revised version opened off-Broadway as Road Show at the Public Theater on October 28, 2008. Directed by John Doyle, it closed December 28, 2008. The production won the 2009 Obie Award for Music and Lyrics and the Drama Desk Award for Outstanding Lyrics.

==== Sondheim on Sondheim and Six by Sondheim ====
Asked about writing new work, Sondheim replied in 2006: "No ... It's age. It's a diminution of energy and the worry that there are no new ideas. It's also an increasing lack of confidence. I'm not the only one. I've checked with other people. People expect more of you and you're aware of it and you shouldn't be." In December 2007, he said that in addition to continuing work on Bounce, he was "nibbling at a couple of things with John Weidman and James Lapine".

Lapine prepared the multimedia production iSondheim: aMusical Revue, which was scheduled to open in April 2009 at the Alliance Theatre in Atlanta; it was canceled due to "difficulties encountered by the commercial producers attached to the project ... in raising the necessary funds". Later revised as Sondheim on Sondheim, the revue was produced at Studio 54 by the Roundabout Theatre Company; previews began on March 19, 2010, and ran from April 22 to June 13. The revue's cast included Barbara Cook, Vanessa L. Williams, Tom Wopat, Norm Lewis, and Leslie Kritzer.

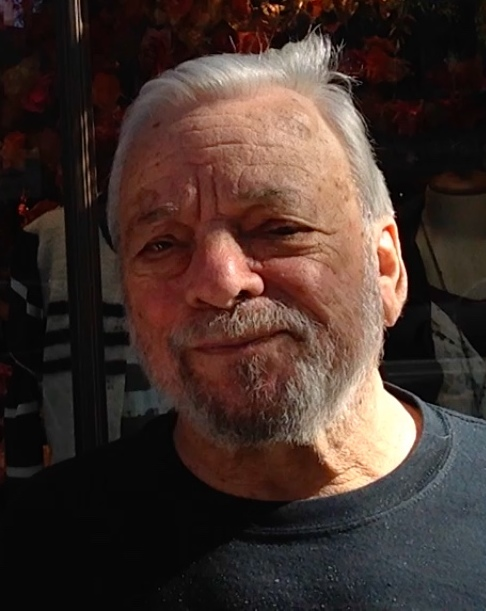
Stephen Sondheim (2014)

In 2013, Lapine directed the documentary Six by Sondheim, which he executive produced with Frank Rich. It explores Sondheim's work through six songs: "Opening Doors", "Being Alive", "I'm Still Here", "Something's Coming", "Send In the Clowns", and "Sunday". Sondheim himself acts and sings in the documentary as Joe, the cynical theater producer in the song "Opening Doors".

Sondheim collaborated with Wynton Marsalis on A Bed and a Chair: A New York Love Affair, an Encores! concert at New York City Center. Directed by John Doyle with choreography by Parker Esse, it consisted of "more than two dozen Sondheim compositions, each piece newly reimagined by Marsalis". The concert featured Bernadette Peters, Jeremy Jordan, Norm Lewis, Cyrille Aimée, four dancers, and the Jazz at Lincoln Center Orchestra conducted by David Loud. In Playbill, Steven Suskin called the concert "neither a new musical, a revival, nor a standard songbook revue; it is, rather, a staged-and-sung chamber jazz rendition of a string of songs ... Half of the songs come from Company and Follies; most of the other Sondheim musicals are represented, including the lesser-known Passion and Road Show".

==== Here We Are ====
Sondheim and David Ives began work on a musical based on Luis Buñuel's films The Exterminating Angel and The Discreet Charm of the Bourgeoisie, initially slated for previews at the Public Theater in 2017. That date was cast into doubt after an August 2016 reading for the musical had only the first act finished. A November 2016 workshop included Matthew Morrison, Shuler Hensley, Heidi Blickenstaff, Sierra Boggess, Gabriel Ebert, Sarah Stiles, Michael Cerveris, and Jennifer Simard. After media outlets mistakenly reported that the show had the working title Buñuel, Sondheim said that it still lacked a title in 2017. The Public Theatre denied reports that the show would be part of its 2019–20 season, but hoped to produce the musical "when it is ready". Development reportedly ceased for a time, but resumed for a September 2021 reading of the show, then called Square One. Nathan Lane and Bernadette Peters were involved in a reading of this new work, and Sondheim discussed adapting the Buñuel films in his final interview. A posthumous production, directed by Joe Mantello, premiered at The Shed in September 2023 as Here We Are.

== Other projects ==
=== Conversations with Frank Rich and others ===
The Kennedy Center staged a 15-week repertory festival of six Sondheim musicals—Sweeney Todd, Company, Sunday in the Park with George, Merrily We Roll Along, Passion, and A Little Night Music—from May to August 2002. The Kennedy Center Sondheim Celebration also included Pacific Overtures, a junior version of Into the Woods, and Frank Rich speaking with the composer for Sondheim on Sondheim on April 28, 2002. The two men took their discussion, dubbed "A Little Night Conversation with Stephen Sondheim", on a West Coast tour of different U.S. cities, including Santa Barbara, San Francisco, Los Angeles, and Portland, Oregon, in March 2008, then to Oberlin College in September. The Cleveland Jewish News reported on their Oberlin appearance: "Sondheim said: 'Movies are photographs; the stage is larger than life.' What musicals does Sondheim admire the most? Porgy and Bess tops a list which includes Carousel, She Loves Me, and The Wiz, which he saw six times. Sondheim took a dim view of today's musicals. What works now, he said, are musicals that are easy to take; audiences don't want to be challenged". Sondheim and Rich had additional conversations: January 18, 2009, at Avery Fisher Hall; February 2 at the Landmark Theatre in Richmond, Virginia; February 21 at the Kimmel Center in Philadelphia; and April 20 at the University of Akron in Akron, Ohio. The conversations were reprised at Tufts and Brown University in February 2010, at the University of Tulsa in April, and at Lafayette College in March 2011. Sondheim had another "conversation with" Sean Patrick Flahaven (associate editor of The Sondheim Review) at the Kravis Center in West Palm Beach on February 4, 2009, in which he discussed many of his songs and shows: "On the perennial struggles of Broadway: 'I don't see any solution for Broadway's problems except subsidized theatre, as in most civilized countries of the world.'"

On February 1, 2011, Sondheim joined former Salt Lake Tribune theater critic Nancy Melich before an audience of 1,200 at Kingsbury Hall. Melich described the evening:

He was visibly taken by the university choir, who sang two songs during the evening, "Children Will Listen" and "Sunday", and then returned to reprise "Sunday". During that final moment, Sondheim and I were standing, facing the choir of students from the University of Utah's opera program, our backs to the audience, and I could see tears welling in his eyes as the voices rang out. Then, all of a sudden, he raised his arms and began conducting, urging the student singers to go full out, which they did, the crescendo building, their eyes locked with his, until the final "on an ordinary Sunday" was sung. It was thrilling, and a perfect conclusion to a remarkable evening—nothing ordinary about it.

On March 13, 2008, A Salon with Stephen Sondheim (which sold out in three minutes) was hosted by the Academy for New Musical Theatre in Hollywood.

=== Beyond Broadway ===
Sondheim was an avid fan of puzzles and games. He is credited with introducing cryptic crosswords, a British invention, to American audiences through a series of puzzles he created for New York in 1968 and 1969. Sondheim was "legendary" in theater circles for "concocting puzzles, scavenger hunts and murder-mystery games", inspiring the central character of Anthony Shaffer's 1970 play Sleuth. Sondheim's love of puzzles and mysteries is evident in The Last of Sheila (1973), a whodunit written with Anthony Perkins. Directed by Herbert Ross, it featured Dyan Cannon, Joan Hackett, Raquel Welch, James Mason, James Coburn, Ian McShane, and Richard Benjamin. Sondheim collaborated with Company librettist George Furth on the play Getting Away with Murder (1996); the Broadway production closed after 31 previews and only 17 performances.

Sondheim wrote music for film: most notably, he contributed five songs to Warren Beatty's Dick Tracy, including "Sooner or Later (I Always Get My Man)", which won the Academy Award for Best Original Song. He also contributed to Reds (both to the score and the song "Goodbye for Now"), The Seven-Per-Cent Solution ("The Madam's Song", later recorded as "I Never Do Anything Twice"), Stavisky (writing the score), and The Birdcage ("Little Dream" and the eventually cut "It Takes All Kinds"). For the 2014 film adaptation of Into the Woods, Sondheim wrote the new song "She'll Be Back" for The Witch (Meryl Streep), which was eventually cut. Sondheim made a posthumous cameo appearance as himself in Glass Onion: A Knives Out Mystery (2022).

In 2003, Sondheim was invited to serve as guest curator for the Telluride Film Festival. He admired the work of Trey Parker and wrote him a letter in which he called South Park: Bigger, Longer & Uncut (1999) the best movie musical in 15 years. In a second letter, Sondheim wrote that he voted for Team America: World Police (2004) for Best Picture. He signed off, "Would you ever be interested in writing a stage musical with an old traditionalist, namely me?"

=== Mentoring ===
==== Adam Guettel ====
Having been mentored by Hammerstein, Sondheim returned the favor, saying that he loved "passing on what Oscar passed on to me". In an interview with Sondheim for The Legacy Project, composer-lyricist Adam Guettel (son of Mary Rodgers and grandson of Richard Rodgers) recalled how as a 14-year-old boy he showed Sondheim his work. Guettel was "crestfallen" since he had come in "sort of all puffed up thinking I would be rained with compliments and things", which was not the case since Sondheim had some "very direct things to say". Later, Sondheim wrote and apologized to Guettel for being "not very encouraging" when he was actually trying to be "constructive". After Guettel's musical Floyd Collins premiered off-Broadway, Sondheim put a song from it, "The Riddle Song", on a list of songs he "wish[ed] he had written" for the Library of Congress. In an interview with Library of Congress Senior Music Specialist Mark Eden Horowitz, Sondheim said:

I've been around the block so many times that I tend to be ahead of the chordal structure of most music... in the musical theater... So when it surprises, it really surprises... Sometimes, as in a score like Floyd Collins, which I think is a great score, I want to study the music... I really want to see how he did it. It's not all that dissonant music, it's that he's got a fresh mind; he doesn't go where you expect him to, and yet it sounds inevitable... you get that in Kern, and you get that in Adam's work too, and that's the mark of a good composer.

==== Jonathan Larson ====
Sondheim mentored Jonathan Larson, attending Larson's workshop for Superbia (originally an adaptation of Nineteen Eighty-Four). In Larson's musical Tick, Tick... Boom!, a voicemail is played in which Sondheim apologizes for leaving early, says he wants to meet him, and is impressed with his work. Sondheim called Larson one of the few composers "attempting to blend contemporary pop music with theater music, which doesn't work very well; he was on his way to finding a real synthesis. A good deal of pop music has interesting lyrics, but they are not theater lyrics", adding that a musical-theater composer "must have a sense of what is theatrical, of how you use music to tell a story, as opposed to writing a song. Jonathan understood that instinctively." After Larson died, Sondheim reflected on Larson's work:

I met him at a show called Superbia. I don't remember what brought us together. My guess is he wrote me a letter and asked to meet. I meet a lot of young composers: if they write a letter and the work interests me at all, I will always meet with them. He worked on Superbia for a long time while I knew him, which I think was right after the first draft. I thought the show was interesting and that what he was trying to do was interesting. I thought some of the songs were good and others not. The opening number had some originality to it, whereas the others didn't. He was still finding a voice and I think he still is. But he had a voice and that was the important thing.

Sondheim also commented on Larson's work in Rent, giving him notes throughout the writing process:

I think it is a work in progress...He wanted to put in everything and the kitchen sink, and he did. I think it suffers from that... At one point I sent three songs from Rent to David Geffen, at Jonathan's request I think, and he got turned down within a week. He said it fell between two stools. Partly showbiz and partly pop... I didn't know that Jonathan would die, that made it a myth... The last time I'd spoken to him was in December [1995]. He felt pleased about the way he was growing up. He felt that way any author does in the middle of rehearsal—"It's terrible, it's wonderful, I'm ashamed of it, isn't it great?"

==== Lin-Manuel Miranda ====
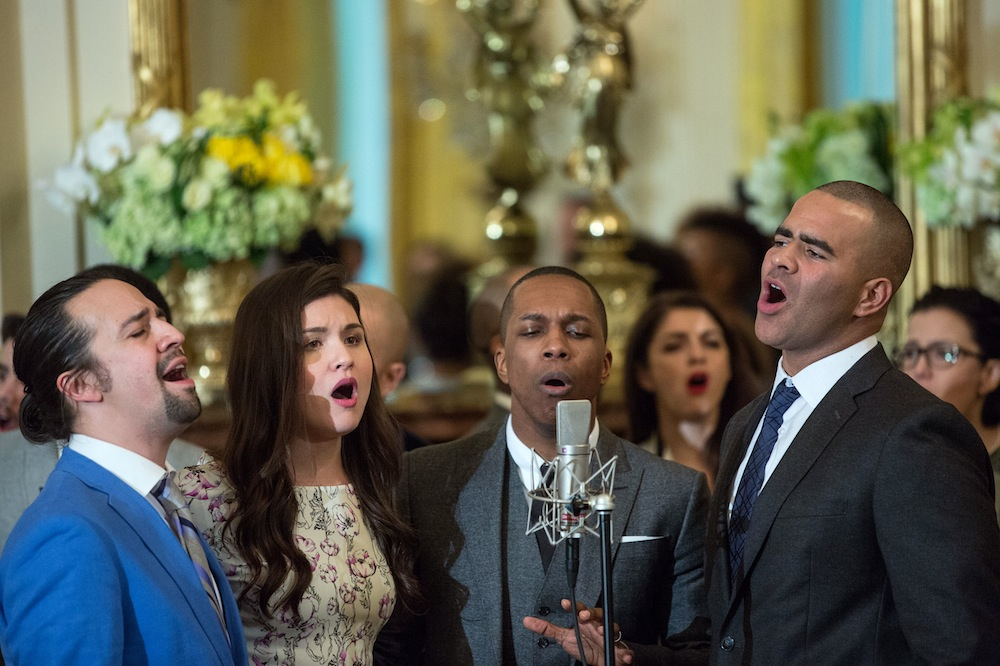
Lin-Manuel Miranda and the cast of Hamilton

Around 2008, Sondheim approached Lin-Manuel Miranda to work with him on translating West Side Story's lyrics into Spanish for an upcoming Broadway revival. Miranda later showed Sondheim his project The Hamilton Mixtape, which Sondheim gave notes on. Sondheim was originally wary of the project, but he believed Miranda's attention to and respect for good rhyming made it work. In an interview, Sondheim called Hamilton a "breakthrough":

At some point, Lin-Manuel started telling me about Hamilton, which, back then, was called The Hamilton Mixtape. He sent me lyrics printed out, and recordings of the songs. This raised obvious red flags: I worried that an evening of rap might get monotonous; I thought the rhythm might become relentless.

But the wonderful thing about Lin-Manuel's use of rap is that he's got one foot in the past. He knows theater. He respects and understands the value of good rhyming, without which the lines tend to flatten out. Jokes don't land the way they should. Even emotional lines don't land the way they should. Rhyme does something to the listener's perception that is very important, and Lin-Manuel recognizes that, which gives the Hamilton score a great deal more heft than it might otherwise have. Most lyrics are by their very nature banal—it's the way they're expressed that makes them soar.

Hamilton is a breakthrough, but it doesn't exactly introduce a new era. Nothing introduces an era. What it does is empower people to think differently. There's always got to be an innovator, somebody who experiments first with new forms. The minute something is a success, everybody imitates it. It's what happened with Oklahoma; everybody immediately started to write bad Western musicals. Hair also had that effect. But eventually people stop imitating and the form matures. Hair allowed young writers to say, "Hey, let's use rock as a way of telling a story." Now they'll say, "Let's use rap as a way of telling a story." So we'll certainly see more rap musicals. The next thing we'll get is Lincoln set to rap. If you think I'm kidding, talk to me in a year.

Sondheim made a voice cameo in Miranda's 2021 film adaptation of Tick, Tick... Boom!, in the scene where he leaves a phone message. Sondheim worked on a revised text of the message and voiced it himself after Bradley Whitford, who portrays him, was unavailable to rerecord the line.

==== Oxford master class ====
In 1989, Cameron Mackintosh had a Contemporary Theatre Chair endowed at the University of Oxford and invited Sondheim to be the first in a series of artist-in-residence professors. Submissions to take the course came from throughout the world. The selected group of students were Leslie Arden, Denise Wharmby, Patrick Dineen, Ed Hardy, Stephen Clarke, Andrew Pergiovanni, Kit Hesketh-Harvey, James McConnel, Ben Mason, Paul James, Paul Leigh, Stephen Keeling, and Michael Bland. Sondheim held a series of master classes during the production process of the National Theatre's Sunday in the Park with George. He taught 13 students, giving them various writing assignments while they worked on their own musicals.

=== Dramatists Guild ===
A supporter of writers' rights in the theater industry, Sondheim was an active member of the Dramatists Guild of America. In 1973, he was elected as the Guild's 16th president, serving until 1981.

== Unrealized projects ==
According to Sondheim, he was asked to translate Mahagonny-Songspiel: "But I'm not a Brecht/Weill fan and that's really all there is to it. I'm an apostate: I like Weill's music when he came to America better than I do his stuff before ... I love The Threepenny Opera but, outside of The Threepenny Opera, the music of his I like is the stuff he wrote in America—when he was not writing with Brecht, when he was writing for Broadway." He turned down an offer to musicalize Nathanael West's A Cool Million with James Lapine c. 1982.

Around 1960, Sondheim and Burt Shevelove considered making a musical of Sunset Boulevard, and had sketched out the opening scenes when they approached the film's director Billy Wilder at a cocktail party on the possibility. Wilder rejected the idea, believing the story was more suited to opera. Sondheim agreed, and resisted a later offer from Prince and Hugh Wheeler to create a musical version starring Angela Lansbury. Several years later, Andrew Lloyd Webber wrote a Sunset Boulevard musical.

Sondheim and Leonard Bernstein wrote The Race to Urga, scheduled for Lincoln Center in 1969, but after Jerome Robbins left the project, it was not produced.

After writing The Last of Sheila together, Sondheim and Anthony Perkins tried to collaborate again two more times, but the projects were unrealized. In 1975, Perkins said he and Sondheim were working on another script, The Chorus Girl Murder Case: "It's a sort of stew based on all those Bob Hope wartime comedies, plus a little Lady of Burlesque and a little Orson Welles magic show, all cooked into a Last of Sheila-type plot". He later said other inspirations were They Got Me Covered, The Ipcress File and Cloak and Dagger. They had sold the synopsis in October 1974. At one point, Michael Bennett was to direct, with Tommy Tune to star. In November 1979, Sondheim said they had finished it, but the film was never made. In the 1980s, Perkins and Sondheim collaborated on another project, the seven-part Crime and Variations for Motown Productions. In October 1984 they had submitted a treatment to Motown. It was a 75-page treatment set in the New York socialite world about a crime puzzle; another writer was to write the script. It, too, was never made.

In 1991, Sondheim worked with Terrence McNally on a musical, All Together Now. McNally said, "Steve was interested in telling the story of a relationship from the present back to the moment when the couple first met. We worked together a while, but we were both involved with so many other projects that this one fell through". The story follows Arden Scott, a 30-something female sculptor, and Daniel Nevin, a slightly younger, sexually attractive restaurateur. Its script, with concept notes by McNally and Sondheim, is archived in the Harry Ransom Center at the University of Texas at Austin. In February 2012, it was announced that Sondheim would collaborate on a musical titled All Together Now with David Ives and he had "about 20–30 minutes of the musical completed". The show was assumed to follow the format of Merrily We Roll Along. Sondheim described the project as "two people and what goes into their relationship ... We'll write for a couple of months, then have a workshop. It seemed experimental and fresh 20 years ago. I have a feeling it may not be experimental and fresh anymore". Ives later described All Together Now as "a musical that exploded a single moment in the lives of two people meeting for the first time. We'd see the moment without music and then we'd explore it musically." Ives and Sondheim worked on the piece intermittently until Sondheim's death, but it was ultimately unrealized.

Sondheim worked with William Goldman on Singing Out Loud, a musical film, in 1992, penning the song "Water Under the Bridge". According to Sondheim, he had written six and a half songs and Goldman one or two drafts of the script when director Rob Reiner lost interest in the project. "Dawn" and "Sand" were recorded for the albums Sondheim at the Movies and Unsung Sondheim.

Nathan Lane said that he once approached Sondheim about creating a musical based on Being There (1979), with Lane starring as the central character of Chauncey. Sondheim declined on the basis that the central character is essentially a cipher, whom an audience would not accept expressing himself through song.

In August 2003, Sondheim expressed interest in the idea of creating a musical adaptation of Groundhog Day (1993), but in a 2008 live chat, he said that "to make a musical of Groundhog Day would be to gild the lily. It cannot be improved." The musical was later created and premiered in 2016 with music and lyrics by Tim Minchin and book by Danny Rubin (screenwriter of the film) with Sondheim's blessing.

== Awards, honors and legacy ==
Sondheim received an Academy Award, eight Tony Awards and eight Grammy Awards. He also received the Pulitzer Prize for Drama for Sunday in the Park with George (1985, shared with James Lapine) and was honored with the Kennedy Center Honors's Lifetime Achievement (1993). He received the Hutchinson Prize for Music Composition (1950) and was elected to the American Academy of Arts and Letters (1983). He was also awarded the Golden Plate Award of the American Academy of Achievement presented by Awards Council member James Earl Jones (2005), the Algur H. Meadows Award from Southern Methodist University (1994), a Special Laurence Olivier Award (2011) "in recognition of his contribution to London theatre", and the 2012 Critics' Circle Theatre Award, which according to drama section chair Mark Shenton "is effectively a lifetime achievement award." He became a member of the American Theater Hall of Fame (2014). In 2013, Sondheim was awarded The Edward MacDowell Medal by The MacDowell Colony for outstanding contributions to American culture In November 2015, Sondheim was awarded the Presidential Medal of Freedom by President Barack Obama in a ceremony at the White House. (Note: Sondheim was named for this award for 2014, but was unable to attend the ceremony, and thus was named again for the 2015 award and ceremony.)

Sondheim founded Young Playwrights Inc. in 1981 to introduce young people to writing for the theater, and was the organization's executive vice-president. The Stephen Sondheim Center for the Performing Arts, at the Fairfield Arts and Convention Center in Fairfield, Iowa, opened in December 2007 with performances by Len Cariou, Liz Callaway, and Richard Kind, all of whom had participated in Sondheim musicals.

The Stephen Sondheim Society was established in 1993 to provide information about his work, with its Sondheim – the Magazine provided to its membership. The society maintains a database, organizes productions, meetings, outings, and other events, and assists with publicity. Its annual Student Performer of the Year Competition awards a £1,000 prize to one of twelve musical-theatre students from UK drama schools and universities. At Sondheim's request, an additional prize is offered for a new song by a young composer. Judged by George Stiles and Anthony Drewe, each contestant performs a Sondheim song and a new song.

Most episode titles of Desperate Housewives refer to Sondheim's song titles or lyrics, and the series finale is titled "Finishing the Hat". In 1990, Sondheim, as the Cameron Mackintosh chair in musical theater at Oxford, conducted workshops with promising musical writers including George Stiles, Anthony Drewe, Andrew Peggie, Paul James, Kit Hesketh-Harvey, and Stephen Keeling. The writers founded the Mercury Workshop in 1992, which merged with the New Musicals Alliance to become MMD (a UK-based organization to develop new musical theater, of which Sondheim was a patron). Stephen Colbert said: "When I was 19, I read the lyrics of 'Putting It Together' to my mother, to say that this is what I wanted to do with my life. Even though I had no idea of what 'this' might be. I couldn't sing like Mandy Patinkin, I couldn't compose like Sondheim, I couldn't write or direct like James Lapine. But like Seurat's hat, that play was a window from this world to that."

Signature Theatre in Arlington County, Virginia established its Sondheim Award, which includes a $5,000 donation to a nonprofit organization of the recipient's choice, "as a tribute to America's most influential contemporary musical theatre composer". The first award, to Sondheim, was presented at an April 27, 2009, benefit with performances by Bernadette Peters, Michael Cerveris, Will Gartshore, and Eleasha Gamble. The 2010 recipient was Angela Lansbury, with Peters and Catherine Zeta-Jones hosting the April benefit. The 2011 honoree was Bernadette Peters. Other recipients were Patti LuPone in 2012, Hal Prince in 2013, Jonathan Tunick in 2014, and James Lapine in 2015. The 2016 awardee was John Weidman and the 2017 awardee was Cameron Mackintosh.

Henry Miller's Theatre, on West 43rd Street in New York City, was renamed the Stephen Sondheim Theatre on September 15, 2010, for the composer's 80th birthday. In attendance were Nathan Lane, Patti LuPone, and John Weidman. Sondheim said of the honor: "I'm deeply embarrassed. Thrilled, but deeply embarrassed. I've always hated my last name. It just doesn't sing. I mean, it's not Belasco. And it's not Rodgers and it's not Simon. And it's not Wilson. It just doesn't sing. It sings better than Schoenfeld and Jacobs. But it just doesn't sing". Lane said, "We love our corporate sponsors and we love their money, but there's something sacred about naming a theatre, and there's something about this that is right and just".

In 2010, The Daily Telegraph wrote that Sondheim was "almost certainly" the only living composer with a quarterly journal published in his name; The Sondheim Review, founded in 1994, chronicled and promoted his work. It ceased publication in 2016.

In Greta Gerwig's 2017 film Lady Bird, characters perform songs from Merrily We Roll Along, Into the Woods, and Anyone Can Whistle. In 2019, it was observed that three major films of that year prominently featured Sondheim songs: Joker (Wall Street businessmen sing "Send In the Clowns" on the subway), Marriage Story (Adam Driver sings "Being Alive"; Scarlett Johansson, Merritt Wever, and Julie Hagerty sing "You Can Drive a Person Crazy"), and Knives Out (Daniel Craig sings "Losing My Mind"). In Paddington 2, Hugh Grant sings "Rain on the Roof".

Sondheim's work has also been referenced in television, such as The Morning Show (Jennifer Aniston and Billy Crudup sing "Not While I'm Around"). He voiced himself in The Simpsons episode "Yokel Chords".

=== Sondheim at 80 ===
Several benefits and concerts were performed to celebrate Sondheim's 80th birthday in 2010. Among them were the New York Philharmonic's March 15 and 16 Sondheim: The Birthday Concert at Lincoln Center's Avery Fisher Hall, hosted by David Hyde Pierce. The concert included Sondheim's music, performed by some of the original performers. Lonny Price directed and Paul Gemignani conducted; performers included Laura Benanti, Matt Cavenaugh, Michael Cerveris, Victoria Clark, Jenn Colella, Jason Danieley, Alexander Gemignani, Joanna Gleason, Nathan Gunn, George Hearn, Patti LuPone, Marin Mazzie, Audra McDonald, John McMartin, Donna Murphy, Karen Olivo, Laura Osnes, Mandy Patinkin, Bernadette Peters, Bobby Steggert, Elaine Stritch, Jim Walton, Chip Zien, and the 2009 Broadway revival cast of West Side Story. A ballet was performed by Blaine Hoven and María Noel Riccetto to Sondheim's score for Reds and Jonathan Tunick paid tribute to his longtime collaborator. The concert was broadcast on PBS's Great Performances in November, and its DVD was released on November 16.

Sondheim 80, a Roundabout Theatre Company benefit, was held on March 22. The evening included a performance of Sondheim on Sondheim, dinner and a show at the New York Sheraton. "A very personal star-studded musical tribute" featured new songs by contemporary musical-theater writers. The composers (who sang their own songs) included Tom Kitt and Brian Yorkey, Michael John LaChiusa, Andrew Lippa, Robert Lopez and Kristen Anderson-Lopez, Lin-Manuel Miranda (accompanied by Rita Moreno), Duncan Sheik, Jeanine Tesori, and David Lindsay-Abaire. Bernadette Peters performed a song that had been cut from a Sondheim show.

An April 26 New York City Center birthday celebration and concert to benefit Young Playwrights, among others, featured (in order of appearance) Michael Cerveris, Alexander Gemignani, Donna Murphy, Debra Monk, Joanna Gleason, Maria Friedman, Mark Jacoby, Len Cariou, BD Wong, Claybourne Elder, Alexander Hanson, Catherine Zeta-Jones, Raúl Esparza, Sutton Foster, Nathan Lane, Michele Pawk, the original cast of Into the Woods, Kim Crosby, Chip Zien, Danielle Ferland, Ben Wright, Angela Lansbury, and Jim Walton. The concert, directed by John Doyle, was co-hosted by Mia Farrow; greetings from Sheila Hancock, Julia McKenzie, Milton Babbitt, Judi Dench, and Glynis Johns were read. After Catherine Zeta-Jones performed "Send in the Clowns", Julie Andrews sang part of "Not a Day Goes By" in a recorded greeting. Patti LuPone, Barbara Cook, Bernadette Peters, Tom Aldredge, and Victor Garber were originally scheduled to perform, but did not appear.

A July 31 BBC Proms concert celebrated Sondheim's 80th birthday at the Royal Albert Hall. The concert featured songs from many of his musicals, including "Send in the Clowns" sung by Judi Dench (reprising her role as Desirée in the 1995 production of A Little Night Music), and performances by Bryn Terfel and Maria Friedman.

On November 19 the New York Pops, led by Steven Reineke, performed at Carnegie Hall for Sondheim's 80th birthday. Kate Baldwin, Aaron Lazar, Christiane Noll, Paul Betz, Renee Rakelle, Marilyn Maye, and Alexander Gemignani appeared, and songs included "I Remember", "Another Hundred People", "Children Will Listen", and "Getting Married Today". Sondheim took the stage during an encore of "Old Friends".

=== Sondheim at 90 ===
To honor Sondheim's 90th birthday, The New York Times published a special nine-page Theater supplement featuring comments by "Critics, Performers and Fans on the Bard of Broadway." Due to theater closures during the COVID-19 pandemic, the Broadway revival of Company set to open on March 22, 2020, Sondheim's 90th birthday, was delayed. Instead the virtual concert Take Me to the World: A Sondheim 90th Birthday Celebration was livestreamed on the Broadway.com YouTube channel on April 26, with performers including Lin-Manuel Miranda, Steven Spielberg, Meryl Streep, Nathan Lane, Mandy Patinkin, Victor Garber, Bernadette Peters, Patti LuPone, Neil Patrick Harris, Jake Gyllenhaal, Christine Baranski, Sutton Foster, Josh Groban, Ben Platt, Brandon Uranowitz, Katrina Lenk, Kelli O'Hara, Jason Alexander, Brian Stokes Mitchell, Beanie Feldstein, Audra McDonald, Laura Benanti, and Raúl Esparza. JAY Records released the first complete recording of Anyone Can Whistle in December 2020, with the composer's milestone birthday used to promote the restoration of the 1997 audio recorded at Abbey Road Studios with cast members Julia McKenzie, Maria Friedman, and John Barrowman joined by a 42-piece orchestra. After New York City theaters reopened in 2021, Sondheim attended revivals of two of his musicals: the opening night of Assassins at the Classic Stage Company on November 14, and the first post-shutdown preview of Company at the Jacobs Theatre on November 15.

=== Stephen Sondheim's Old Friends ===
In 2022, Cameron Mackintosh presented Stephen Sondheim's Old Friends, a two-hour concert tribute to the late Sondheim. The concert happened in the West End in May and aired on BBC Two in December. Performers at the event included Helena Bonham Carter, Rob Brydon, Petula Clark, Judi Dench, Damian Lewis, Julia McKenzie, Bernadette Peters, and Imelda Staunton. Highlights included Dench singing "Send in the Clowns", Peters singing "Children Will Listen", and "Everything's Coming Up Roses".

Mackintosh revived the tribute for a limited run at the Gielgud Theatre beginning previews on September 16, 2023, with a planned closing on January 6, 2024. The production stars Bernadette Peters, marking her West End debut, and Lea Salonga, returning to the West End for the first time since 1996.

== Style, themes and influences ==
According to Sondheim, when he asked Milton Babbitt if he could study atonality, Babbitt replied: "You haven't exhausted tonal resources for yourself yet, so I'm not going to teach you atonal". Music critic Anthony Tommasini wrote that Sondheim's work, "while hewing to a tonal musical language, activated harmonies and folded elements of jazz and impressionist styles in his own distinctive, exhilarating voice."

Sondheim is known for complex polyphony in his vocals, such as the five minor characters who make up a Greek chorus in A Little Night Music. He used angular harmonies and intricate melodies. His musical influences were varied; although he said he "loves Bach", his favorite musical period was from Brahms to Stravinsky.

Raymond-Jean Frontain writes that, thematically, Sondheim's musicals occupy a paradoxical place in gay culture, describing him as a gay creative artist who never created an explicitly gay character but nevertheless attained gay cult status. Frontain continues:

He incarnates the paradox of a highly intellectualized gay perspective that prizes ambivalence, undercuts traditional American progressivism, and rejects the musical's historically idealistic view of sex, romance, and the family; but that at the same time eschews camp, deconstructs the diva, and is apparently oblivious to AIDS, the post-Stonewall struggle for civil equality, and other socio-political issues that concern most gay men of his generation.

Luca Prono described Sondheim's work as rejecting the traditional image of the Western world typically presented in Broadway productions, instead depicting it as "predatory and alienating". His works have acquired a cult following with queer audiences, and his songs have been adopted as life scores for successive generations of gays, and have often had a primary role in AIDS fundraising events. "Somewhere" from West Side Story was informally adopted as a gay anthem before the start of the gay liberation movement, but Sondheim rejected that reading, saying, "If you think that's a gay song, then all songs about getting away from the realities of life are gay songs."

In an interview with Terry Gross, Sondheim said:

I'm interested in the theater because I'm interested in communication with audiences [...] Otherwise I would be in concert music. I'd be in another kind of profession. I love the theater as much as music, and the whole idea of getting across to an audience and making them laugh, making them cry—just making them feel—is paramount to me.

Matt Zoller Seitz cited Sondheim's work for its bravery to express the truth, in all its complexity: "compassionately but without sugarcoating anything", devoid of the "easy reassurances and neat resolutions" typically demanded in the marketplace.

On Desert Island Discs, Sondheim chose Brahms's Second Piano Concerto, Ravel's Piano Concerto for the Left Hand, Copland's Music For the Theater, Stravinsky's Symphony of Psalms, and his own "Ballad of Sweeney Todd", "Finishing the Hat" and "The Advantages of Floating in the Middle of the Sea". His first choice was Gershwin's "Oh Bess, Where Is My Bess?" His book choice was The Collected Works of E. B. White.

== Personal life and death ==
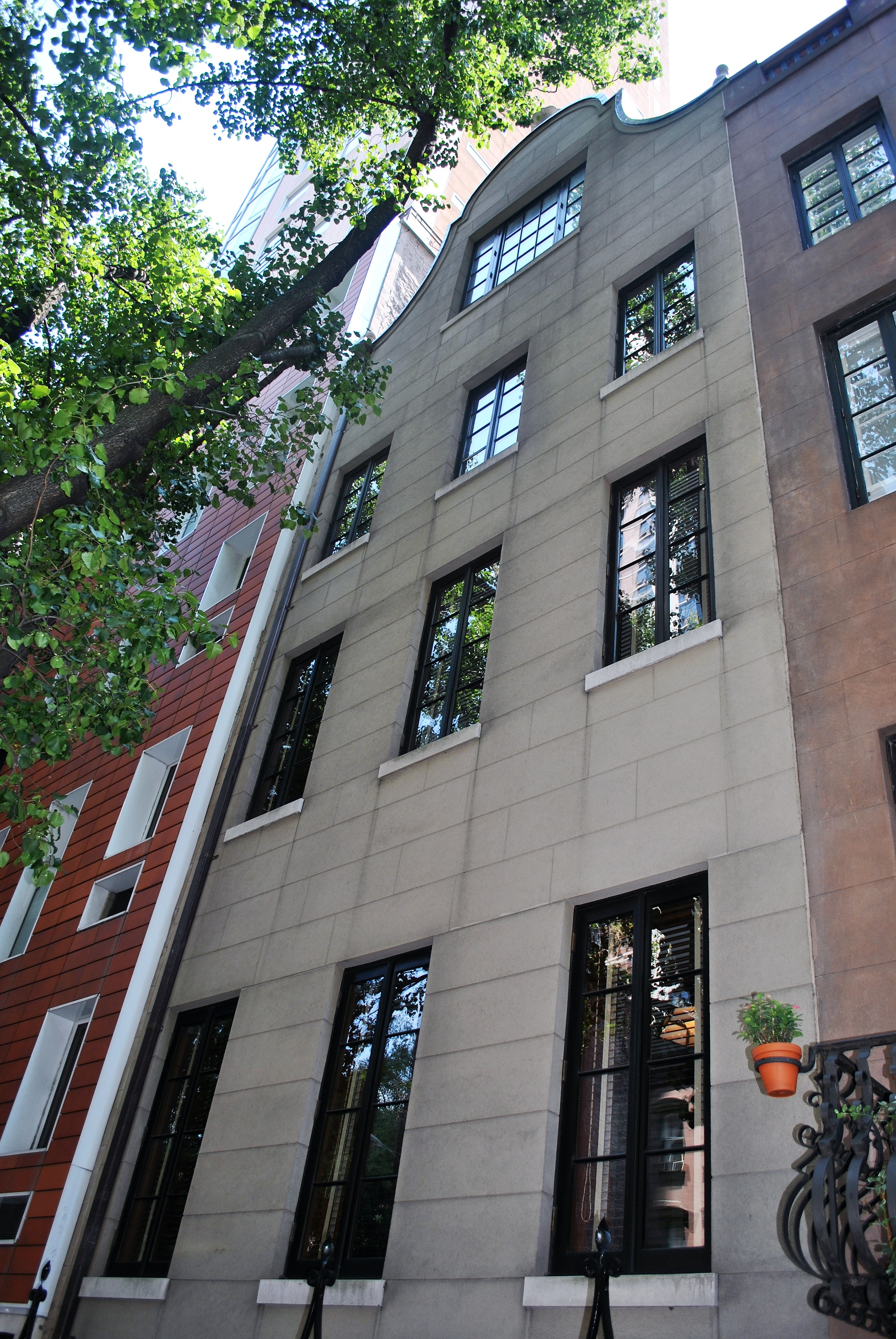
Stephen Sondheim's House, Turtle Bay, New York City, New York

Sondheim was often described as introverted and solitary. In an interview with Frank Rich, he said: "The outsider feeling—somebody who people want to both kiss and kill—occurred quite early in my life". Sondheim jokingly told the New York Times in 1966: "I've never found anybody I could work with as quickly as myself, or with less argument", although he described himself as "naturally a collaborative animal".

Sondheim detested his mother, who was said to be psychologically abusive and to have projected her anger from her failed marriage onto her son: "When my father left her, she substituted me for him. And she used me the way she used him, to come on to and to berate, beat up on, you see. What she did for five years was treat me like dirt, but come on to me at the same time." She once wrote him a letter saying the only regret she had was giving birth to him. When she died in 1992, Sondheim did not attend her funeral. He had been estranged from her for nearly 20 years.

Sondheim came out as gay at age 40. He rarely discussed his personal life, though he said in 2013 that he had not been in love before he turned 60, when he entered into a roughly eight-year relationship with dramatist Peter Jones. Sondheim met Jones in 1990, when Jones, an aspiring composer, wrote him a letter. The two soon began a romantic relationship. Jones moved in with Sondheim, and in 1993, the couple exchanged rings. In a 1994 interview focused on the Broadway production of Passion, Sondheim said he was in love for the first time in his life. In April 1996, Sondheim and Jones broke up due to Jones's infidelity, but in late 1997, Jones and Sondheim began seeing each other again, and Jones moved back in with Sondheim. In mid-1998, after difficulties in their relationship, Jones moved out of the house, though they continued a romantic relationship until 2002. In 2003, Sondheim and his assistant, Steve Clar, hired Jones as an archivist.

Sondheim married Jeffrey Scott Romley, a digital technologist, in 2017; they lived in Manhattan and Roxbury, Connecticut. Sondheim called Romley "a great joy in my life", adding, "Once I had tasted the joys of living with someone, I wanted to live with someone else." Sondheim and Romley had two dogs, Willie and Addie, named after the main characters of Road Show.

In 2010–2011, Sondheim published, in two volumes, his autobiography, Finishing the Hat: Collected Lyrics (1954–1981) with Attendant Comments, Principles, Heresies, Grudges, Whines and Anecdotes and Look, I Made a Hat: Collected Lyrics (1981–2011) with Attendant Comments, Amplifications, Dogmas, Harangues, Digressions, Anecdotes and Miscellany. The memoir included Sondheim's lyrical declaration of principle, stating that four principles underpinned "everything I've ever written". These were: "Content Dictates Form, Less is More, God is in the Details—all in the service of Clarity."

In Six by Sondheim, Sondheim said he liked to write his music lying down and occasionally had a cocktail to help him write.

Sondheim died of cardiovascular disease at his home in Roxbury, Connecticut, on November 26, 2021, at age 91. Collaborator and friend Jeremy Sams said Sondheim "died in the arms of his husband, Jeff". On November 29, theatres across the West End of London dimmed their lights for two minutes to mark Sondheim's passing. Broadway theaters similarly dimmed their marquee lights for one minute on December 8.

It is estimated that Sondheim's estate, including the rights to his work, was valued at around $75 million, all of which was placed in trust. In his will, he named F. Richard Pappas and a second unnamed person as the executors. Beneficiaries included his husband, Jeff; his frequent collaborator James Lapine; former lover Peter Jones; former assistant Steven Clar; designer Peter Wooster; gardener Rob Girard; the Smithsonian Institution; the Library of Congress; and the New York Public Library for the Performing Arts.

The Library of Congress received Sondheim's papers in early 2025 and made many available for public viewing in July. Head music specialist Mark Eden Horowitz first began pursuing the papers in 1993, when the music division invited Sondheim to the library to "knock his socks off". They showed him papers from his mentor, Oscar Hammerstein II, along with materials from Sondheim's other heroes. George Gershwin's manuscript for Porgy and Bess brought Sondheim to tears and convinced him to leave his own papers at the library. The collection includes over 5,000 items.

== Major works ==
Year	Title	Music	Lyrics	Book	Ref.
1955 (Note: Saturday Night was in rehearsals to open on Broadway in 1955, but the production was abandoned in the rehearsal stages after the death of the producer. A few songs from the completed score were recorded over the years, but Saturday Night as a whole was not performed on stage until 1997.)	Saturday Night	Stephen Sondheim		Julius J. Epstein	
1957	West Side Story	Leonard Bernstein	Stephen Sondheim	Arthur Laurents	
1959	Gypsy	Jule Styne	Stephen Sondheim	Arthur Laurents	
1962	A Funny Thing Happened on the Way to the Forum	Stephen Sondheim		Burt Shevelove, Larry Gelbart	
1964	Anyone Can Whistle	Stephen Sondheim		Arthur Laurents	
1965	Do I Hear a Waltz?	Richard Rodgers	Stephen Sondheim	Arthur Laurents	
1966	Evening Primrose	Stephen Sondheim		James Goldman	
1970	Company	Stephen Sondheim		George Furth	
1971	Follies	Stephen Sondheim		James Goldman	
1973	A Little Night Music	Stephen Sondheim		Hugh Wheeler	
1974 (Note: Original version performed in 1974 by the Yale Repertory Theatre in the Yale swimming pool. Heavily revised (with many new songs) and first performed on Broadway in 2004.)	The Frogs	Stephen Sondheim		Burt Shevelove; Nathan Lane (2004 book)	
1976	Pacific Overtures	Stephen Sondheim		John Weidman	
1979	Sweeney Todd: The Demon Barber of Fleet Street	Stephen Sondheim		Hugh Wheeler	
1981	Merrily We Roll Along	Stephen Sondheim		George Furth	
1984	Sunday in the Park with George	Stephen Sondheim		James Lapine	
1987	Into the Woods	Stephen Sondheim		James Lapine	
1990	Assassins	Stephen Sondheim		John Weidman	
1994	Passion	Stephen Sondheim		James Lapine	
2008	Road Show	Stephen Sondheim		John Weidman	
2023	Here We Are (Note: Here We Are was first staged posthumously; Sondheim called the show Square One during his lifetime.)	Stephen Sondheim		David Ives	

== Published works ==
- Stephen Sondheim's Crossword Puzzles: From New York Magazine (1980) ISBN 0-06-090708-8
- Finishing the Hat: Collected Lyrics (1954–1981) with Attendant Comments, Principles, Heresies, Grudges, Whines and Anecdotes (2010) ISBN 978-0-679-43907-3
- Look, I Made a Hat: Collected Lyrics (1981–2011) with Attendant Comments, Amplifications, Dogmas, Harangues, Digressions, Anecdotes and Miscellany (2011) ISBN 978-0-307-59341-2

== See also ==
- List of Tony Award records

== Notes and references ==
=== Sources ===
- Gottfried, Martin (1993). Sondheim. photos by Martha Swope. New York: Harry N. Abrams. ISBN 0-8109-3844-8.
- Secrest, Meryle (1998). Stephen Sondheim: A Life. New York: Alfred A. Knopf. ISBN 0-679-44817-9.
- Zadan, Craig (1986). Sondheim & Co (2 ed.). New York: Harper & Row. ISBN 0-06-015649-X.

Awards and achievements
Preceded by Harold Prince	Special Tony Award for Lifetime Achievement in the Theatre; 2008	Succeeded by Jerry Herman
