= Works of Stephen Sondheim =

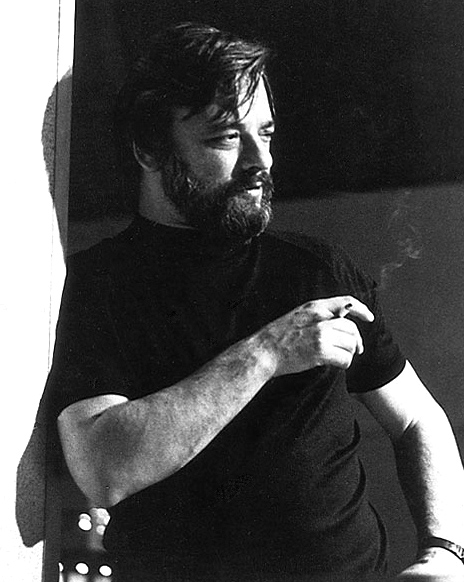
Stephen Sondheim circa 1970

Stephen Sondheim was an American composer and lyricist whose most acclaimed works include A Funny Thing Happened on the Way to the Forum (1962), Company (1970), Follies (1971), A Little Night Music (1973), Sweeney Todd: The Demon Barber of Fleet Street (1979), Sunday in the Park with George (1984), and Into the Woods (1987). He is also notable as the lyricist for West Side Story (1957) and Gypsy (1959).

== Major works ==
Year	Title	Music	Lyrics	Book	Notes
1954	Saturday Night	Stephen Sondheim		Julius J. Epstein	Based on the play Front Porch in Flatbush by Epstein and his brother Philip
1957	West Side Story	Leonard Bernstein	Stephen Sondheim	Arthur Laurents	Based on Romeo and Juliet by William Shakespeare
1959	Gypsy	Jule Styne	Stephen Sondheim	Arthur Laurents	Based on the 1957 memoirs of Gypsy Rose Lee
1962	A Funny Thing Happened on the Way to the Forum	Stephen Sondheim		Burt Shevelove and Larry Gelbart	Based on the farces of the ancient Roman playwright Plautus, specifically Curculio, Pseudolus, Miles Gloriosus, and Mostellaria
1964	Anyone Can Whistle	Stephen Sondheim		Arthur Laurents	
1965	Do I Hear a Waltz?	Richard Rodgers	Stephen Sondheim	Arthur Laurents	
1966	Evening Primrose	Stephen Sondheim		James Goldman	Based on a John Collier short story published in the 1951 collection Fancies and Goodnights
1970	Company	Stephen Sondheim		George Furth	
1971	Follies	Stephen Sondheim		James Goldman	Inspired by the ZIegfeld Follies
1973	A Little Night Music	Stephen Sondheim		Hugh Wheeler	Inspired by the 1955 Ingmar Bergman film Smiles of a Summer Night
1974	The Frogs	Stephen Sondheim		Burt Shevelove	Based on the Ancient Greek comedy The Frogs by Aristophanes; the book was revised in 2004 by Nathan Lane
1976	Pacific Overtures	Stephen Sondheim		John Weidman	
1979	Sweeney Todd: The Demon Barber of Fleet Street	Stephen Sondheim		Hugh Wheeler	Based on the 1970 play Sweeney Todd by Christopher Bond
1981	Merrily We Roll Along	Stephen Sondheim		George Furth	Based on the 1934 play by George S. Kaufman and Moss Hart
1984	Sunday in the Park with George	Stephen Sondheim		James Lapine	Inspired by Georges Seurat's painting A Sunday Afternoon on the Island of La Grande Jatte
1987	Into the Woods	Stephen Sondheim		James Lapine	Based on Brothers Grimm and other traditional fairy tales
1990	Assassins	Stephen Sondheim		John Weidman	Based on real assassinations and attempts on US presidents
1994	Passion	Stephen Sondheim		James Lapine	Based on the film Passione d'Amore by Ettore Scola
2008	Road Show	Stephen Sondheim		John Weidman	Inspired by the lives of brothers Addison Mizner and Wilson Mizner
2023	Here We Are	Stephen Sondheim		David Ives	Based on the films The Discreet Charm of the Bourgeoisie and The Exterminating Angel by Luis Buñuel

== Revues and anthologies ==
The following are revues of Sondheim's work as composer and lyricist, with songs performed in or cut from productions.

Year	Title	Music	Lyrics	Book	Notes
1976	Side by Side by Sondheim	Stephen Sondheim (with selections by Jule Styne, Leonard Bernstein, Richard Rodgers, and Mary Rodgers)	Stephen Sondheim	Ned Sherrin	
1980	Marry Me a Little	Stephen Sondheim		Craig Lucas, Norman René	Setting of songs cut from Sondheim's better-known musicals, as well as Saturday Night
1993	Putting It Together	Stephen Sondheim		Stephen Sondheim, Julia McKenzie	
2010	Sondheim on Sondheim	Stephen Sondheim (with selections by Jule Styne, Leonard Bernstein, Richard Rodgers)	Stephen Sondheim	James Lapine	
2022	Stephen Sondheim's Old Friends	Stephen Sondheim		Cameron Mackintosh	

Jerome Robbins' Broadway features "You Gotta Have a Gimmick" from Gypsy, "Suite of Dances" from West Side Story and "Comedy Tonight" from A Funny Thing Happened on the Way to the Forum. The 2010 revue Classic Moments, Hidden Treasures was conceived and directed by Tim McArthur, first produced at the Jermyn Street Theatre. Sondheim's "Pretty Women," "Don't Laugh," and "Everybody Ought to Have a Maid" are featured in The Madwoman of Central Park West.

== Film and TV adaptations ==
Year	Title	Director	Notes
1961	West Side Story	Robert Wise; Jerome Robbins	Film adaptation
1962	Gypsy	Mervyn LeRoy	Film adaptation
1966	A Funny Thing Happened On the Way to the Forum	Richard Lester	Film adaptation
1966	Evening Primrose	Paul Bogart	Television musical
1977	A Little Night Music	Harold Prince	Film adaptation
1993	Gypsy	Emile Ardolino	Television adaptation
2007	Sweeney Todd: The Demon Barber of Fleet Street	Tim Burton	Film adaptation
2014	Into the Woods	Rob Marshall	Film adaptation
2021	West Side Story	Steven Spielberg	Film adaptation
TBA	Merrily We Roll Along	Richard Linklater	Film adaptation

== Other works ==
=== Theatre ===
Year	Title	Role	Notes
1946	By George	First complete musical	Written while a student at the George School in Newtown, PA.
1951	I Know My Love	Christmas carol arrangement	
1955	A Mighty Man is He	"Rag Me That Mendelssohn March"	
1956	Girls of Summer	Incidental music	
1957	Take Five	Revue	
1960	Invitation to a March	Incidental music	
1963	Hot Spot	"Don't Laugh"	Written for Judy Holliday
1966	The Mad Show	"The Boy From…" (lyrics)	
1967	Illya Darling	"I Think She Needs Me" (lyrics; unused)	
1971	Twigs	"Hollywood and Vine" (music)	
1973	The Enclave	Incidental music	
1974	Candide	New lyrics	
1975	By Bernstein	Additional lyrics	
1996	Getting Away with Murder	Co-writer with George Furth	
2007	King Lear	Incidental music for Public Theater production	

=== Film and television ===
Year	Title	Notes
1953	Topper	Co-writer of eleven episodes
1973	The Last of Sheila	Co-writer with Anthony Perkins
1974	June Moon	Plays the role of Maxie Schwartz on PBS television version
1974	Stavisky	Score (Alain Resnais film)
1976	The Seven-Per-Cent Solution	Wrote "The Madam's Song", also known as "I Never Do Anything Twice"
1981	Reds	Music for and includes "Goodbye For Now"
1990	Dick Tracy	Wrote five songs
1996	The Birdcage	Two songs for the film: "It Takes All Kinds" (unused) and "Little Dream"
2003	Camp	Cameo as himself
2007	The Simpsons	Guest appearance as himself, Episode: "Yokel Chords"
2013	Six by Sondheim	HBO documentary by James Lapine
2016	Best Worst Thing That Ever Could Have Happened	Documentary about original Merrily We Roll Along production
2021	Tick, Tick... Boom!	Vocal cameo as himself
2022	Glass Onion: A Knives Out Mystery	Cameo as himself (Posthumous release)

=== Unproduced works for theatre ===
Year	Title	Music	Lyrics	Book	Notes
1949	All That Glitters	Stephen Sondheim			Based on the 1924 play Beggar on Horseback by George S. Kaufman and Marc Connelly. Wrote five songs "When I See You", "I Love You, Etc.", "Let's Not Fall in Love", "I Need Love", and "I Must Be Dreaming".
1953	Climb High	Stephen Sondheim			
1953	The Legendary Mizners	Stephen Sondheim			Based on the 1953 biography of the same name by Alva Johnston. The basis for what would eventually become Road Show.
1956	The Last Resorts	Stephen Sondheim		Jean Kerr	Based upon the social study of the same name written by Cleveland Amory. Wrote three songs, "High Life", "Pour le Sport", and "I Wouldn't Change a Thing".
1957	Ring Around the Moon	Stephen Sondheim		Arthur Laurents (unwritten)	Based on the play Invitation to the Castle by Jean Anouilh.
1962	Passionella segment of The World of Jules Feiffer	Stephen Sondheim		Jules Feiffer	Sondheim contributed the song "Truly Content" as well as incidental music.
1968	A Pray by Blecht	Leonard Bernstein	Stephen Sondheim	John Guare	Based on the play The Exception and the Rule by Bertolt Brecht
1994	Muscle	Stephen Sondheim		James Lapine	Based on the memoir Muscle: Confessions of an Unlikely Bodybuilder by Samuel Fussell

=== Unproduced works for television ===
Year	Title	Notes
1953	The Man with the Squeaky Shoes	Non-musical teleplay
1954	The Lady, or the Tiger?	Music and lyrics co-written with Mary Rodgers. Based on the eponymous 1882 short story by Frank R. Stockton.
1956	I Believe in You	Incidental music. Wrote one song, "They Ask Me Why I Believe in You".
1958	The Jet-Propelled Couch	Musical adaptation of the story by Robert Lindner
1960	Do You Hear a Waltz?	Musical adaptation of Arthur Laurent's play The Time of the Cuckoo, later redeveloped as Do I Hear a Waltz? in 1965

=== Unproduced works for film ===
Year	Title	Notes
1969	The Thing of It Is...	Unproduced screenplay by William Goldman based on his novel. Wrote one song, "No, Mary Ann".
1992	Singing Out Loud	Unproduced film musical with a screenplay by William Goldman. Wrote six songs, "Dawn", "Looks", "Lunch", "Sand", "Singing Out Loud", and "Water Under the Bridge".
1995	Into the Woods	Unproduced screen adaptation of the original stage musical in collaboration with The Jim Henson Company. Wrote two new songs, "I Wish" and "Rainbows".

=== Books ===
Sondheim's 2010 Finishing the Hat annotates his lyrics "from productions dating 1954–1981. In addition to published and unpublished lyrics from West Side Story, Follies and Company, the tome finds Sondheim discussing his relationship with Oscar Hammerstein II and his collaborations with composers, actors and directors throughout his lengthy career". The book, first of a two-part series, is named after a song from Sunday in the Park With George. Sondheim said, "It's going to be long. I'm not, by nature, a prose writer, but I'm literate, and I have a couple of people who are vetting it for me, whom I trust, who are excellent prose writers". Finishing the Hat was published in October 2010. According to a New York Times review, "The lyrics under consideration here, written during a 27-year period, aren't presented as fixed and sacred paradigms, carefully removed from tissue paper for our reverent inspection. They're living, evolving, flawed organisms, still being shaped and poked and talked to by the man who created them". The book was 11th on the New York Times' Hardcover Nonfiction list for November 5, 2010.

The sequel, Look, I Made a Hat: Collected Lyrics (1981–2011) with Attendant Comments, Amplifications, Dogmas, Harangues, Digressions, Anecdotes and Miscellany, was published on November 22, 2011. Continuing from Sunday in the Park With George, the book includes sections on Sondheim's work in film and television.

Musicologist and Library of Congress curator Mark Eden Horowitz conducted a series of in-depth interviews with Sondheim, published in 2003 as Sondheim on Music: Minor Details and Major Decisions.
