= Scapigliatura =

Artistic movement in 19th-century Italy

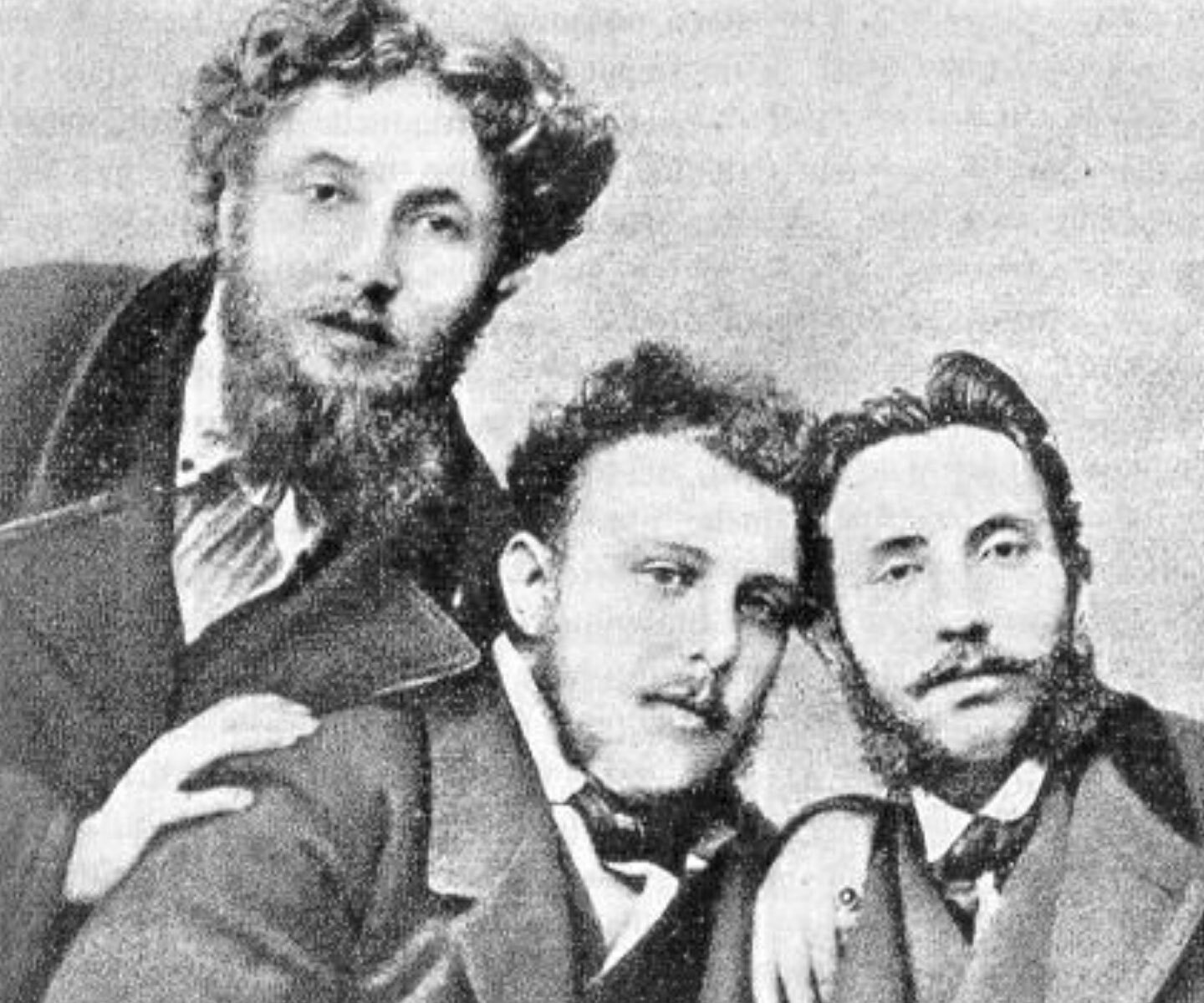
- Emilio Praga, Carlo Dossi & Luigi Conconi in a late 19th-century photo.

Additional media
- Location: Italy
- Influences: Bohemianism, German Romanticism
- Influenced: Decadentism; Verismo; Crepuscolari

Scapigliatura (Italian: [skapiʎʎaˈtuːra]) is the name of an artistic movement that developed in Italy after the Risorgimento period (1815–71). The movement included poets, writers, musicians, painters and sculptors. The term "Scapigliatura" is the Italian equivalent of the French bohème (bohemian), and scapigliato literally means "unkempt" or "dishevelled". Most of these authors have never been translated into English, hence in most cases this entry cannot have and has no detailed references to specific sources from English books and publications. However, a list of sources from Italian academic studies of the subject is included, as is a list of the authors' main works in Italian.

== History ==
=== Origin and inspiration ===
The term Scapigliatura was derived from the novel La Scapigliatura e il 6 Febbraio by Cletto Arrighi, pen-name of Carlo Righetti (1830–1906), who was one of the forerunners of the movement. The main Italian inspiration of the Scapigliati was the writer and journalist Giuseppe Rovani (1818–1874), author of the novel Cento Anni and the influential aesthetic theories of his essays Le Tre Arti, an anti-conformist and charismatic figure on the fringes of the literary world of Milan, the city where the movement first developed through literary 'cenacles' which met in taverns and cafes. It attracted attention and scandalized the more conservative and Catholic circles of Italy with many pamphlets, journals and magazines like Arrighi's Cronaca Grigia, Antonio Ghislanzoni's Rivista Minima, Cesare Tronconi's Lo Scapigliato and Felice Cavallotti and Achille Bizzoni's Gazzettino Rosa, which challenged the status quo artistically, socially and politically. A wing of the movement became politically active, and known as Scapigliatura Democratica was central to the development of both the Socialist and Anarchist movements, with leaders such as the poet Felice Cavallotti who entered the Italian parliament on the extreme left, and whose libertarian ideals attracted much popular support for his political group, known as the Radicali.

=== Purpose ===
The brotherhood of the scapigliati attempted to rejuvenate Italian culture through foreign influences, notably from German Romanticism (Heine, Jean Paul and E.T.A. Hoffmann), French bohemians Théophile Gautier and Gérard de Nerval and, above all, the poetry of Charles Baudelaire and the works of American writer Edgar Allan Poe. The group also helped with the introduction of Wagner's music into Italy, with musician Franco Faccio (1840–1891) conducting the first Italian performances of Die Meistersinger von Nürnberg.

=== Leading figures ===
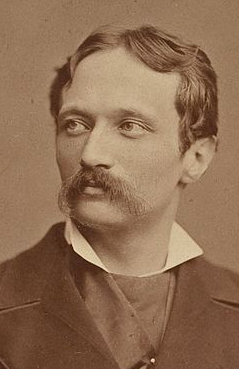
A young Boito

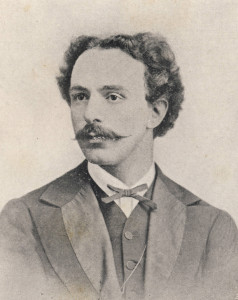
Franco Faccio

The major figures of the movement were the poet and painter Emilio Praga (1839–1875) and the poet and musician Arrigo Boito (1842–1918). The latter is memorable for the fact that he wrote both the libretto and the music (an instance which had no precedent in Italian opera) for his opera Mefistofele, which introduced elements of Wagner's music into Italian opera. Composer and orchestra director Franco Faccio was another important figure for the movement.

The three of them volunteered with guerrilla leader Giuseppe Garibaldi's redshirts to fight the Austrian Empire for the annexation of Venice to the newly formed Kingdom of Italy in 1866. Franco Faccio was also responsible for two of the three Scapigliatura operas: I profughi fiamminghi (with a libretto by Emilio Praga) and Amleto, set to a text by Boito. It was on the lukewarm premiere of the former in 1863 that Faccio was fêted with a banquet where Boito read his ode All'arte italiana, which famously so offended Giuseppe Verdi that the composer refused to work with him when the publisher Ricordi first suggested a collaboration. The offending lines, Forse già nacque chi sovra l'altare / Rizzerà l'arte, verecondo e puro, / Su quel'altar bruttato come un muro / Di lupanare ("Perhaps the man is already born who, modest and pure, will restore art to its altar stained like a brothel's wall"). In later years, Boito wrote revisions to the libretto of Verdi's opera Simon Boccanegra and the original librettos for Otello and Falstaff. Boito is widely considered by most scholars as the best librettist with whom Verdi collaborated.

The movement did not have formal manifestos, but developed organically, through its members sharing common aesthetic and political ideals. In their early days they were known as "Avveniristi", from a line of a Boito's poem which spoke of "L'arte dell'avvenire" (The art of the future). The term Scapigliatura came in vogue later.

=== 1864–1891 ===
Praga and Boito launched the Scapigliatura in earnest when they edited the paper Figaro in 1864. A year later saw the publishing of the first works by poet and novelist Iginio Ugo Tarchetti (1839–1869), who today is the best-known author of the Scapigliatura. They rebelled against late Romantic maudlin poets like Aleardo Aleardi and Giovanni Prati, Italian Catholic tradition and clericalism, and the Italian government's betrayal of the revolutionary roots of the Risorgimento period. Praga scandalized Italy with his second poetry collection Penombre (1864), reminiscent of Baudelaire's Les Fleurs du Mal, and Tarchetti with his novel Una Nobile Follia (1867) in which he opposed the militarist culture of Italy under the reigning Savoy royal family and in which he propounded his anarchism derived from French philosopher Pierre-Joseph Proudhon. In the barracks of the Italian Army officers had bonfires with Tarchetti's books to give "the example" to many young soldiers who identified with Tarchetti's protests (Tarchetti had originally volunteered for the army, but changed his mind and was later discharged because of insubordination and also because of his failing health—after being sent to fight "brigandage" in the south, which he saw as a cruel colonialist war of Piedmont against the recently annexed south of Italy). Boito produced the poetry collection Il Libro Dei Versi, the musical fable Re Orso and memorable short-stories like L'Alfier Nero. In the late 1860s he detached himself from the movement, moved on to more conservative positions and was even made Senator of The Kingdom of Italy in 1914, while Faccio suffered a nervous breakdown and ended in the same mental institution where his father was an inmate.

The manifestos of these young and rebellious writers were the works themselves: poems like Praga's Preludio (Prelude), which opened Penombre striking against Catholicism, and the many mediocre followers of the main Italian novelist of the time, Alessandro Manzoni, author of the classic historical novel I promessi sposi (The Betrothed). Another such manifesto was Arrigo Boito's poem Dualismo (Dualism), which challenged common values and sense of decency by espousing a decadent take on art, inspired mainly by Baudelaire and Poe.

=== Praga, Tarchetti and Camerana ===
Emilio Praga and Igino Ugo Tarchetti are the authors who best represent the Scapigliatura and its aesthetic programme. They were the first in Italy to open up to foreign influences, starting a process of renewal in Italian culture. Synaesthesia, the theory based upon the correspondences among music, poetry and painting, was one of their innovations. They were also the first to promote the literature of Realism, opening the door for the Italian novelists of Verismo such as Giovanni Verga and Luigi Capuana. The influence of the supernatural stories of Poe and Hoffmann on Praga and Tarchetti was the foundation of Italian writers such as Antonio Fogazzaro, Luigi Pirandello and Dino Buzzati.

The works of Praga, Tarchetti and poet Giovanni Camerana (1845–1905) mark the transition from Romanticism to Decadentism, with their Romantic themes of love and death, Gothic imagery, sexuality and narcotics, and the supernatural. Praga was the first poet to imbue his works with the technics of Impressionism, and Camerana's poetry is characterized by a dark Existentialism. The conflict between the lonely artist totally committed to his ideals and the values of bourgeois society was another theme found in the Scapigliati's works.

=== Lifestyle ===
The Scapigliati are also famous for erasing any difference between art and life, and lived their lives of anti-conformism, anarchist idealism and a desire for transcendence to the full. Like Baudelaire and Poe, and French Symbolist poets Arthur Rimbaud and Paul Verlaine after them, they often recurred to the aid of alcohol and drugs. Their lives were also characterized by poverty and financial failure, and they were also the target of a conservative backlash against their movement and its ideals. Praga died an alcoholic aged thirty-five in 1875. Tarchetti died aged twenty-nine in 1869 of tuberculosis and typhoid fever while completing his novel Fosca, practically destitute, in the house of his friend and follower Salvatore Farina. Camerana committed suicide in 1905. Precursors Rovani and Arrighi died both through alcohol abuse.

=== Spread of the movement ===
The movement developed throughout Italy between the 1860s and the 1880s, starting from Milan. Its main offshoot was in Turin and Piedmont, with followers such as Roberto Sacchetti, Giovanni Faldella, and playwright Giuseppe Giacosa. Giulio Pinchetti (1845–1870) was one of the younger and most promising poets, but committed suicide aged twenty-five after publishing his poetry collection Versi. A similar figure was the poet Giulio Uberti—a friend of Giuseppe Mazzini who wrote a type of civic poetry which spread the Republican ideals of Mazzini, a sort of Italian equivalent of Walt Whitman—who committed suicide in 1876 after falling in love with an English teenage girl. Another author who scandalized the country was Lorenzo Stecchetti with his poetry collection Postuma (1876), which in reality was the work of poet Olindo Guerrini who created the character of the young and doomed poet Stecchetti (based upon Tarchetti) for this specific purpose. Among the Scapigliati painters are Tranquillo Cremona, Daniele Ranzoni, and the best-known sculptor is Giuseppe Grandi. Their style would influence later painters such as Medardo Rosso, Mosè Bianchi and Giuseppe Amisani in the 1920s. Giacomo Puccini also took his first steps into the world of Scapigliatura with two librettos by Ferdinando Fontana, namely Le Villi and Edgar, and later composed the opera La bohème. Orchestra director Arturo Toscanini was another famous figure who shared the ideals of the Scapigliatura. Other exponents of the movement were the writers Carlo Dossi (1849–1910) and Camillo Boito (1836–1914), older brother of Arrigo and a well-known art critic, who wrote the short story Senso, which later inspired Luchino Visconti's film by the same title in 1954 and Tinto Brass' film of 2002. Il Corriere della Sera, to this day the major Italian newspaper, was founded by the Scapigliato Eugenio Torelli Viollier, a friend of Tarchetti.

=== Significance ===
The Scapigliati are now considered an important chapter in Italian cultural history, creating the archetype of the artistic avant-garde and are considered the forerunners of literary movements like Decadentism, Symbolism, and the Italian Poeti Crepuscolari of the 1920s and '30s. Praga's poetry collection Trasparenze, published posthumously in 1878, and his novel Memorie Del Presbiterio (left unfinished, completed by Roberto Sacchetti in 1881) are perhaps some of the best examples for illustrating how the Scapigliati were somewhat ahead of their times and prophetic in terms of their vision. In Italian literature, fine arts and music, they are the equivalent of the German Idealists, the French and Russian Symbolists, the English Romantics and the American Transcendentalists.

=== Controversy in opera and the Scapigliatura's ambiguous language for reform ===
Reasons for the Scapigliatura not having been allotted as much attention in the musical arts include several controversial issues. Only three operas have been identified as belonging to this movement, which was thought of as a pseudo-Wagnerian attempt in Italian opera. This has proven to be a fallacy by the operatic scholar, Dr. Mary-Lou Vetere, who has "identified that the Scapigliatura was actually an independent movement between Verdi and Verismo, born to counteract Wagner's growing presence and to protect Italian operatic supremacy."

She has defined the movement with its own set of aesthetic principles and revealed that the Scapigliatura's fundamental purpose was to remain ambiguous in order to achieve its goals; that is—to promote a new and modern Italian aesthetic that might compete more readily with growing international styles. Since ambiguity was a requisite feature of its policy, the language used by the "scapigliati" was intentionally obscure, therefore obscuring the authentic meaning of their works. Verdi's connection to the Scapigliatura, via his collaboration with Arrigo Boito (the most prominent 'scapigliato') has recently inspired the need for deeper scrutiny.

=== Revivals ===
While official culture in Italy has often forgotten the Scapigliati, the movement has had several revivals: during the counter-cultural climate of the late 1960s many of their works were back in print and there were exhibitions dedicated to them, and again in the 1990s, when Tarchetti's Racconti Fantastici and Fosca were translated and published in the US by Lawrence Venuti as Fantastic Tales and Passion, respectively. Filmmaker Ettore Scola turned Tarchetti's Fosca into the film Passione d'Amore, which was released in 1982. Christine Donougher translated Camillo Boito's Senso and Other Stories in English in 1993. In 2005 WP:BIO Robert Caruso (Anglo-Italian rock singer and poet, not to be confused with the American film-director of commercials) translated Praga, Camerana and some of Tarchetti's poetry into English for the first time. American composer Stephen Sondheim adapted Tarchetti's novel Fosca into Passion, a successful Broadway musical in 1994.

== Other Scapigliatura writers and poets ==
- Ferdinando Fontana
- Giuseppe Cesare Molineri
- Achille Giovanni Cagna
- Ambrogio Bazzero
- Cesare Tronconi
- Remigio Zena
- Edoardo Calandra
- Luigi Gualdo
- Domenico Milelli
- Salvatore Farina
- Mario Rapisardi
- Gian Pietro Lucini
- Paolo Valera
- Bernardino Zendrini
- Pompeo Bettini
- Giuseppe Aurelio Costanzo
- Alberto Cantoni
- Felice Cavallotti
- Antonio Ghislanzoni
- Vittorio Imbriani
