= Valeria D'Obici =

Italian actress (born 1944)

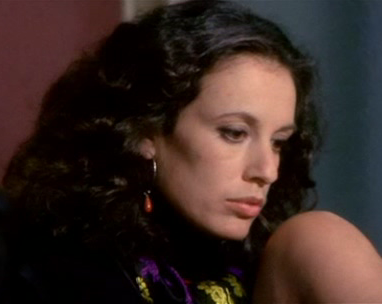
- D'Obici in Killer Cop (1975)
- Born: 17 April 1944 (age 82); Lerici, La Spezia, Italy
- Occupation: Actress
- Years active: 1974–present

Valeria D'Obici (born 17 April 1944) is an Italian film, stage and television actress.

== Career ==
D’Obici was born in Liguria, and moved to Milan in 1967. There she trained at the Piccolo Teatro theatre company directed by Paolo Grassi, and studied acting alongside several future collaborators. After completing her studies, she co-founded a theatrical cooperative with colleagues, and participated in the opening of the Salone Pier Lombardo, later renamed Teatro Franco Parenti. She remained with the company for approximately six years before moving to Rome.

Between 1975 and 1977 she was part of the Eduardo De Filippo stage company.

In 1975 she made her film debut in Killer Cop, a poliziottesco directed by Luciano Ercoli.

Her breakout role was in Ettore Scola’s Passione d’amore (1981), based on the novel by Iginio Ugo Tarchetti. Playing the role of Fosca, it required extensive physical transformation, as D'Obici's character is defined by illness rather than traditional attractiveness, marking a departure from dominant female representations in Italian cinema of the period. The film was presented in competition at the 1981 Cannes Film Festival. She won the Golden Globe for Best Newcomer, the David di Donatello for Best Actress, and Globo d'oro in the same category for the role.

In the same year, she appeared in Peter Del Monte’s Piso Pisello, portraying a maternal figure involved in a surreal narrative that contrasts her character with youthful beauty and innocence. The film further contributed to her association with unconventional and non-stereotypical female roles.

In their book about her, Francesco Foschini and Stefano Careddu describe D’Obici as an actress "sui generis", emphasizing her ability to move fluidly between theatre, cinema, and television, as well as between dramatic and comic roles, often embracing characters that deliberately challenged conventional ideals of female beauty in Italian cinema.

== Awards ==
- 1981: David di Donatello for Best Actress, winner – Passion of Love
- 1981: Globo d'oro for Best Actress, winner – Passion of Love
- 1981: Golden Globe for Best Newcomer, winner – Passion of Love
- 1982: David di Donatello for Best Supporting Actress, nominee – Sweet Pea
- 1984: David di Donatello for Best Supporting Actress, nominee – A Proper Scandal
- 1988: San Remo Film Festival, Best Actress, winner – La rosa bianca
