= Zuriel Oduwole =

American education activist

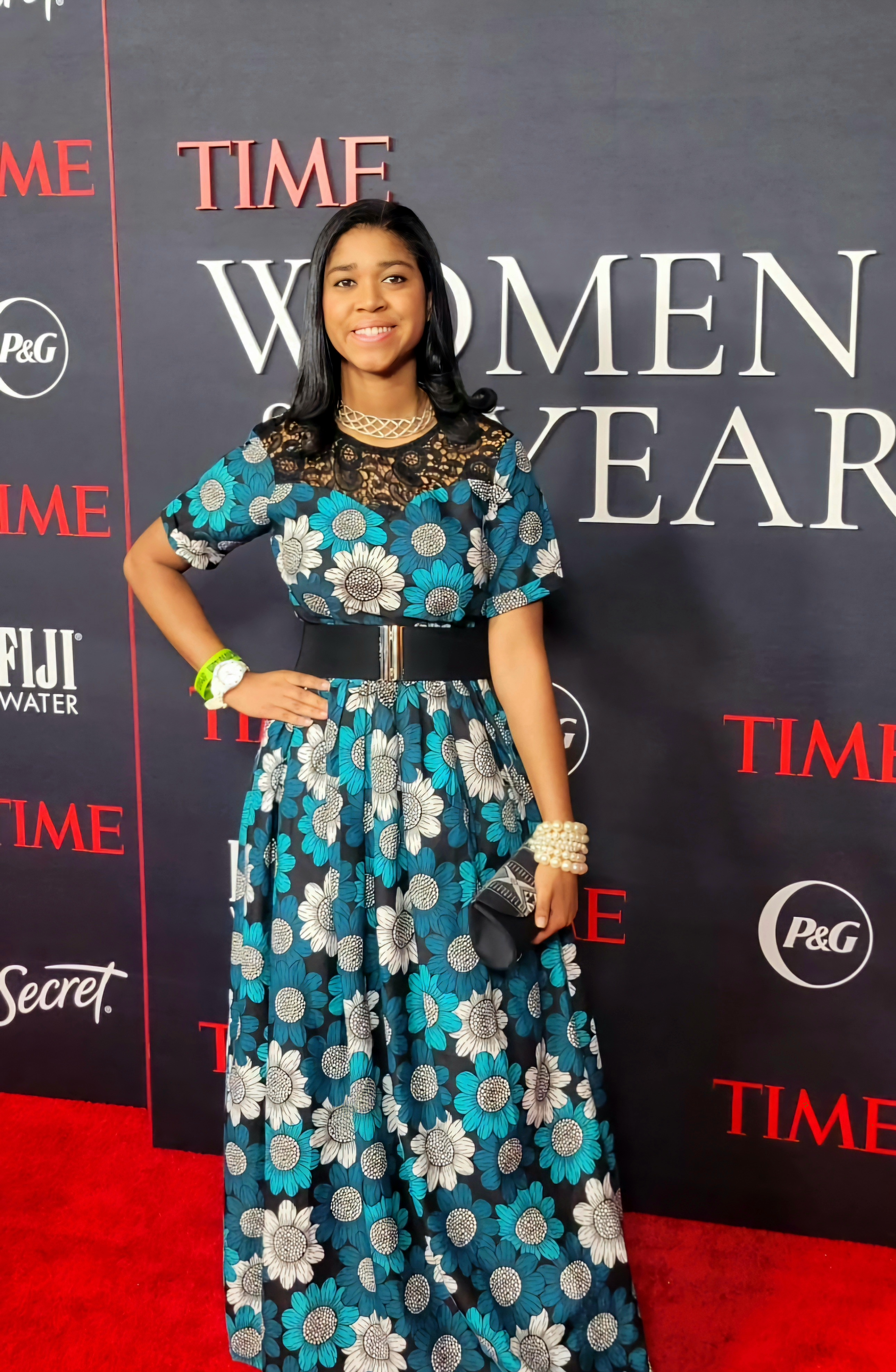
- Born: Zuriel Oduwole; July 2002 (age 24); Los Angeles, California, United States
- Occupations: Child advocate; filmmaker; writer
- Years active: 2012–present
- Notable work: The Ghana Revolution; A Promising Africa
- Website: www.zurieloduwole.com

Dr. Zuriel Oduwole is an American education advocate, policy advisor, and filmmaker. Born to British parents of Mauritian and Nigerian ancestry in Los Angeles, California, Oduwole was first featured in a Forbes magazine in 2010 at the age of 10. In November 2014, Zuriel became the youngest filmmaker to self-produce and edit a screened work for the movie theater and was featured by CNBC..

For her more than a decade long development work since the age of 10, Oduwole was nominated in January 2025 by 2 US institutions and a Senator, for the Nobel Peace Prize. It was in recognition of her many initiatives and interventions in influencing discussions on education across Africa and the Caribbean, actively engaging in diplomatic efforts and peace mediation in South America, the Sahel region and the Middle East, and her work to create opportunities for youths in marginalized communities via a free film making class.

Zuriel has met with 36 presidents and prime ministers in line with her education advocacy and various global socio-development work. Some of these include the leaders of Jamaica, Croatia, Nigeria, Kenya, Tanzania, Malawi, Liberia, South Sudan, Malta, St. Vincent & the Grenadines, Guyana, Sierra Leone and Namibia. She has also appeared in popular television stations including CNBC, Bloomberg TV, BBC and CNN. In 2013, Oduwole was listed in the New African Magazine's list of "100 Most Influential People" and in October 2017, Harvard University graduate school featured her development story.

In May 2026 at the age of 23, she completed her doctoral degree in Global Organizational Change & Leadership from the University of Southern California [USC]

== Early life and career ==
Zuriel meeting US Secretary of State Kerry January 6th 2017

Oduwole was born in Los Angeles, California in July 2002. Her first venture into media and advocacy was in 2012 when she entered a school competition as part of the National History Day (NHD) sponsored by the History Channel with a documentary film about Africa titled The Ghana Revolution. For this she conducted her first presidential interviews, when she met with two former presidents of Ghana: Jerry Rawlings and John Kufuor.

In 2013, after the release of her documentary film titled The 1963 OAU Formation, Zuriel Oduwole was profiled in Forbes Magazine. As part of this second documentary, she interviewed the President of Malawi (Joyce Banda), the President of Tanzania (Jakaya Kikwete) and the President of Mauritius (Rakeshwar Purryag). In March 2013, Oduwole formally started a project called "Dream Up, Speak Up, Stand Up", a campaign which was first launched at the Lagos Business School's Pan-Atlantic University, for the advocacy and promotion of girl-child education in Africa.^{[28]}

In 2014 at age 12, her self-produced documentary film titled A Promising Africa was screened in five countries. On 21 April 2014, Oduwole was listed as the most Powerful 11 year old in the world by New York Business Insider's in their listing of "World's Most Powerful Person at Every Age". In February 2015, Elle Magazine listed her in their annual feature of "33 Women Who Changed The World", alongside Fed Reserve Chairwoman Janet Yellen and President of General Motors, Mary Barra.

== University speeches and early engagements ==
The University of Pretoria in South Africa [aka TUKS] invited her to speak to their student body in March 2015 as a filmmaker, to give the students an insight into how to communicate and tell the story of global events, from a specific perspectiv— as part of their Humanities series.

In April 2015, the Ivy League's Columbia University in New York, U.S. invited her as a featured speaker at their African Economic Forum conference, as well as a segment panelist, to speak about the potentials of the new Africa.

President Alpha Conde of Guinea met and spoke with Zuriel in May 2015, as part of an information documentary she was doing on the Ebola virus, which started in his country Guinea [before ravaging Sierra Leone and Liberia] ,to understand the impact on the economies of the region, as well as the effect on children's education. President Conde was her 15th world leader she would meet to talk about pertinent and pressing issues.

As part of their global #LikeAGirl campaign to shore up girls' confidence as they entered adolescence, global giant Procter & Gamble engaged Zuriel in June 2015 to create a short documentary about the education of girls about puberty, and the support needed during this period of their lives. She wrote, narrated and produced the video for the campaign with the theme Unstoppable Like A Girl.

While attending global events during the 70th United Nations General Assembly session in New York in September 2015, she met David A. Granger, the President of Guyana on the sidelines of the General Assembly, to speak about the Guyana–Venezuela territorial dispute.

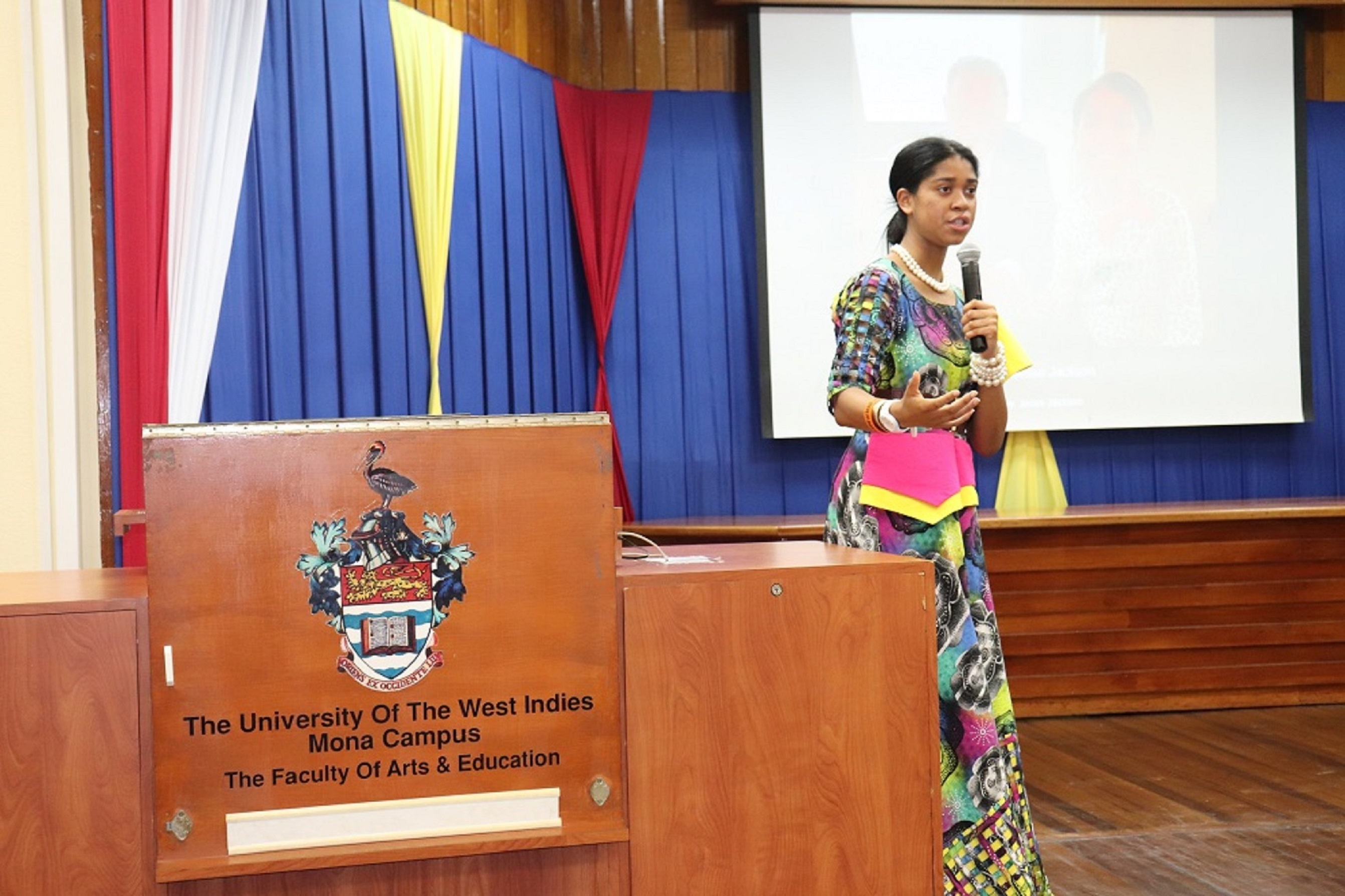
Speaking at the University of West Indies in Jamaica

In December 2015, she formally launched her DUSUSU Foundation aimed at building partnerships with corporation and individuals to develop the education capabilities of children, but especially the girl child, across the globe. As a filmmaker, she launched her film making 101 Initiative for youths in Windhoek, Namibia in March 2016 and Lagos, Nigeria in June 2016, teaching some of Africa's poorest children basic filmmaking skills so they have practical skills they can use in gainful or self-employment as young adults.

In April 2016, at age 13, she was invited as the keynote speaker at the annual Maryland State Department of Education's Early Childhood EducationaC conference at Ocean City, Maryland, addressing more than 600 adult delegates on how she sees the education of future US leaders developing. Later in June 2016, she was invited as the featured speaker as well as a panelist at the annual Women in Entertainment Luncheon, in Los Angeles, California, U.S.

The Guardian Newspaper, in late June 2016 signed her on as a columnist to share her insight on issues as seen by a younger generation and giving her a section and segment for periodic writing. She became a TEDx circuit speaker when she headlined the TEDx Gbagada event in July 2016 as the featured speaker, talking about the inter-onnectivity between the past and future generations.

Complexities in our world today need a different approach to problem-solving, according to Zuriel. For this reason, she continues to speak at universities across the globe, including at Unilag in March 2025, where she believes creativity driven innovation hubs like the MAD House in the University of Lagos are wellsprings of solutions.

== UN events: effect of climate change on education ==
At the 71st United Nations [UN] General Assembly events in New York in September 2016, Zuriel was invited to speak on how the effects of climate change is significantly affecting the education of children in the Pacific Island region. She met to discuss these issues afterwards with the Prime Minister of Samoa - H.E. Tuilaepa Malielegaoi and the Prime Minister of Tuvalu, H.E. Enele Sopoaga. She was invited to meet the new Jamaica Prime Minister - H.E. Andrew Holness, to understand how Global Warming is affecting countries in the Caribbean region also. As President of the COP23 in Bonn, Prime Minister Frank Bainimarama of Fiji shared the challenges his country faced with rising flood waters with Zuriel, asking her to use her documentaries to share with the world the plight of children in the pacific islands. Concerned about the very slow pace of the worlds redress of the climate change issue, she penned her first Op-Ed on the topic in October 2021, ahead of COP26 in Glasgow, in November 2021. It was from a position of knowledge, as a UN designated Climate Neutral 'Champion'

TRT World news interviewed and featured her on their Newsmakers section after her participation at the UN events

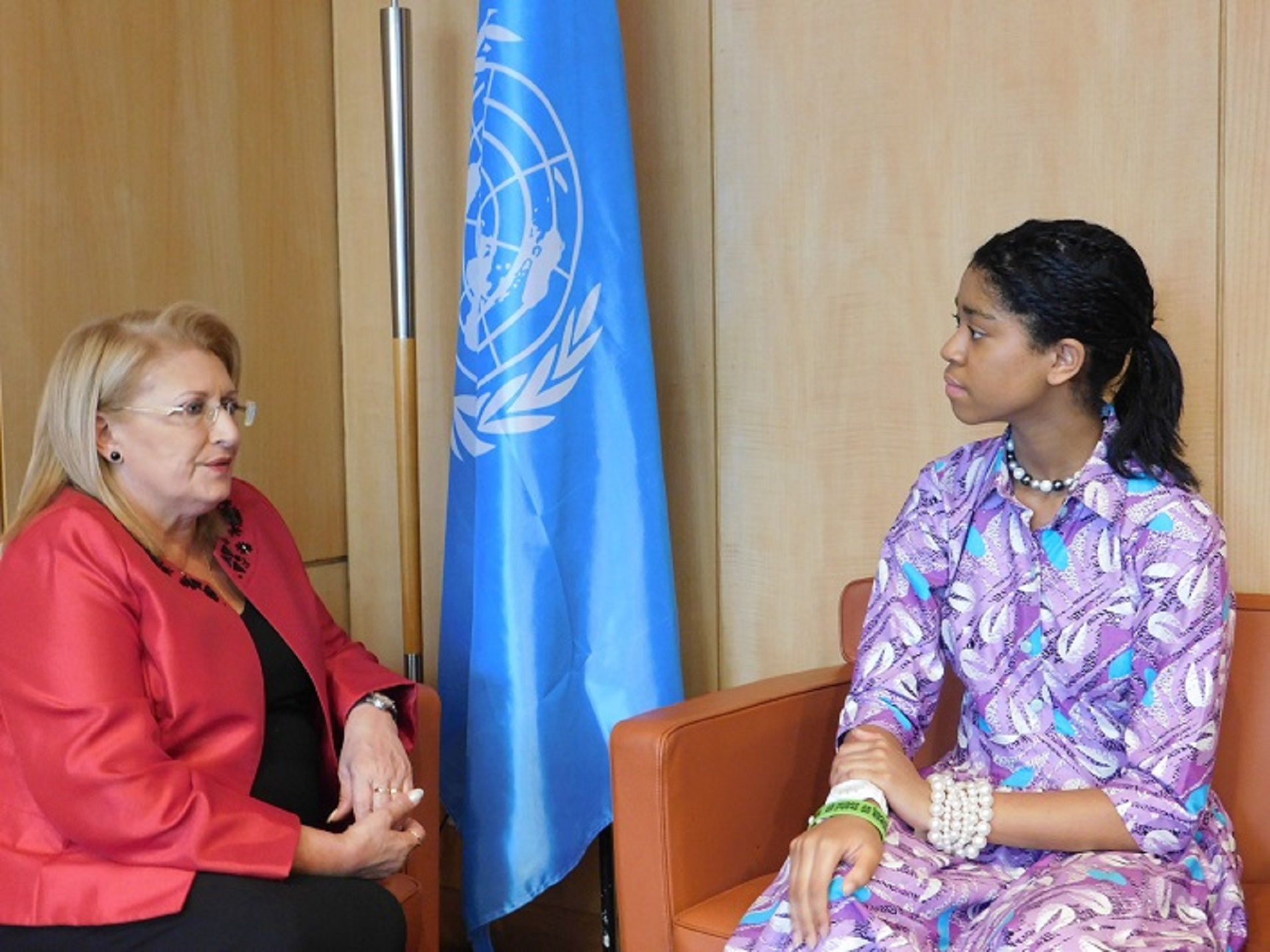
Meeting President Marie-Louise Preca of Malta at UNESCO Paris

In October 2016, she met with her 23rd World Leader, the President of Malta Her Excellency Mary Louise Preca, to share her ideas on building a network of female world leaders to tackle the issue of "out of school children", especially girls, around the world.

As part of activities to commemorate their 11th annual Kreole festival from 22 to 25 November, the government of Mauritius invited Zuriel Oduwole to be the special guest for the years events. Apart from being a judge for the film competition during the festival chaired by the Deputy Prime Minister Xavier-Luc Duval, she taught 150 underprivileged children basic film making skills from the Port Louis municipality as a film maker herself, and was a guest at the African night concert at the country's Citadel center in Port Louis along with Zambian First Lady, H.E. Esther Lungu

== Open advocacy for girls' education and the youth voice ==
On 6 January 2017, the US Secretary of State - Rt Hon John Kerry met Zuriel in Washington DC to commend her for what he called her 'clarity of purpose' in recognizing a major global developmental issue - Girls Education, and taking on the challenge head on. He also lauded her film making class for unemployed youths, which he said was making a tangible difference.

In February 2015, President Kolinda Grabar-Kitarovic of Croatia met with Zuriel Oduwole to commend her work on Girls Education and to learn how her basic 'Film Making 101' skill transfer programs could make a difference for the youth in Croatia.

Forbes Afrique featured Zuriel for their February 2017 [Fevrier 2017] issue. The magazine introduced her DUSUSU Foundation and its evolving partnerships with development groups on the continent, such as the Dangote Foundation, for her Gender Development and Skill transfer project initiatives

Zuriel visited Mexico as an Education Ambassador, speaking to 350 youths in Mexico State and Hidalgo State and taking them through her basic Film Making 101 Class, already conducted in 4 other countries. The City of Pachuca - in Hidalgo state then honored her with an Award and Citation for her global work in the area of Education Development and Girls Equality advocacy President Nana Akufo-Addo of Ghana met with Zuriel in June 2018 in Accra, and commended her for her basic film class projects to benefit the young girls in his country. Zuriel believes that in a digital age of social media and the new economy, learning the art of digital communications and motion picture communications puts girls at an advantage in tackling their own unemployment, as they would have skills they can use effectively in a matter of weeks.

The UN in September 2000 launched the first set of MDGs [Millennium Development Goals] with 8 development goals by 2015, including eradicating extreme poverty, gender equality, and universal primary education. Because the UN did not set an age limit or overall criteria on partnerships aimed at accomplishing these goals, Zuriel saw an opportunity to participate in processes that moved the gender equality needle forward, especially on the African continent where she saw huge challenges. Being a girl and with a first hand understanding of some global challenges girls face, she with the help of volunteers and academics across 3 continents began to collate data and measures the impact first ladies and gender ministers on the African continent are making towards achieving universal primary education, which she sees as a prerequisite for gender equality. She then created the annual DUSUSU [Dream Up, Speak Up, Stand Up] Awards in 2014 to encourage a healthy competition and reference point of progress among African first ladies and African gender ministers, to do more each year for girls education. So far, the first ladies of Tanzania in 2014, Kenya in 2015, Namibia in 2016 Senegal in 2017, Mozambique in 2018, Cape Verde in 2019 and Sierra Leone in 2020 have received the award between 2014 and 2020, as well as gender ministers from Ghana, Rwanda, Jamaica and Mauritius.

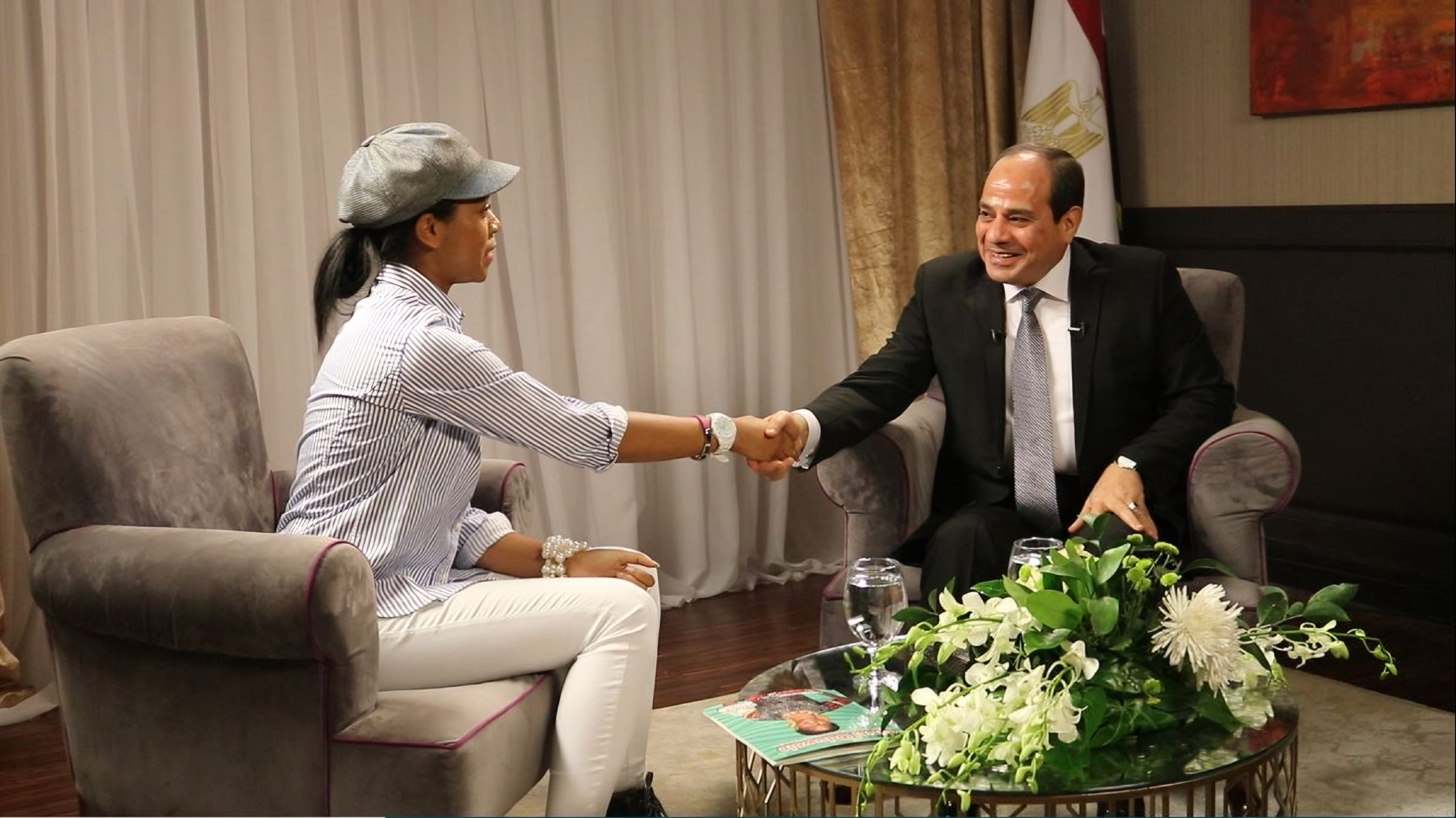
Zuriel Meets President Abdel Fattah El-Sisi in Egypt

Brushing aside geopolitical challenges around the Middle East, and simply driven by the need to continue to dialog with world leaders on the issues of youth development and advocating for a stronger youth voice in finding solutions to the worlds social problems, she sat down in December 2018 with her first Arab leader - the President of Egypt - Abdel Fattah El-Sisi and shared her ideas on how leaders in the region and youths can communicate openly their ideas constructively, without animosity. According to her, the youths of today, would become the leaders of tomorrow.

The US Embassy in Kingston - Jamaica in recognition of the impact she is making in the lives of children around the world, especially girls, invited her to visit the Mona school in Kingston in May 2019. She spoke to 200 girls about the power of dreams, a good education, showed herself as an example of what an educated girl can accomplish, and asked them never to give up in what they believe in.

== Fighting against girl and child marriage ==
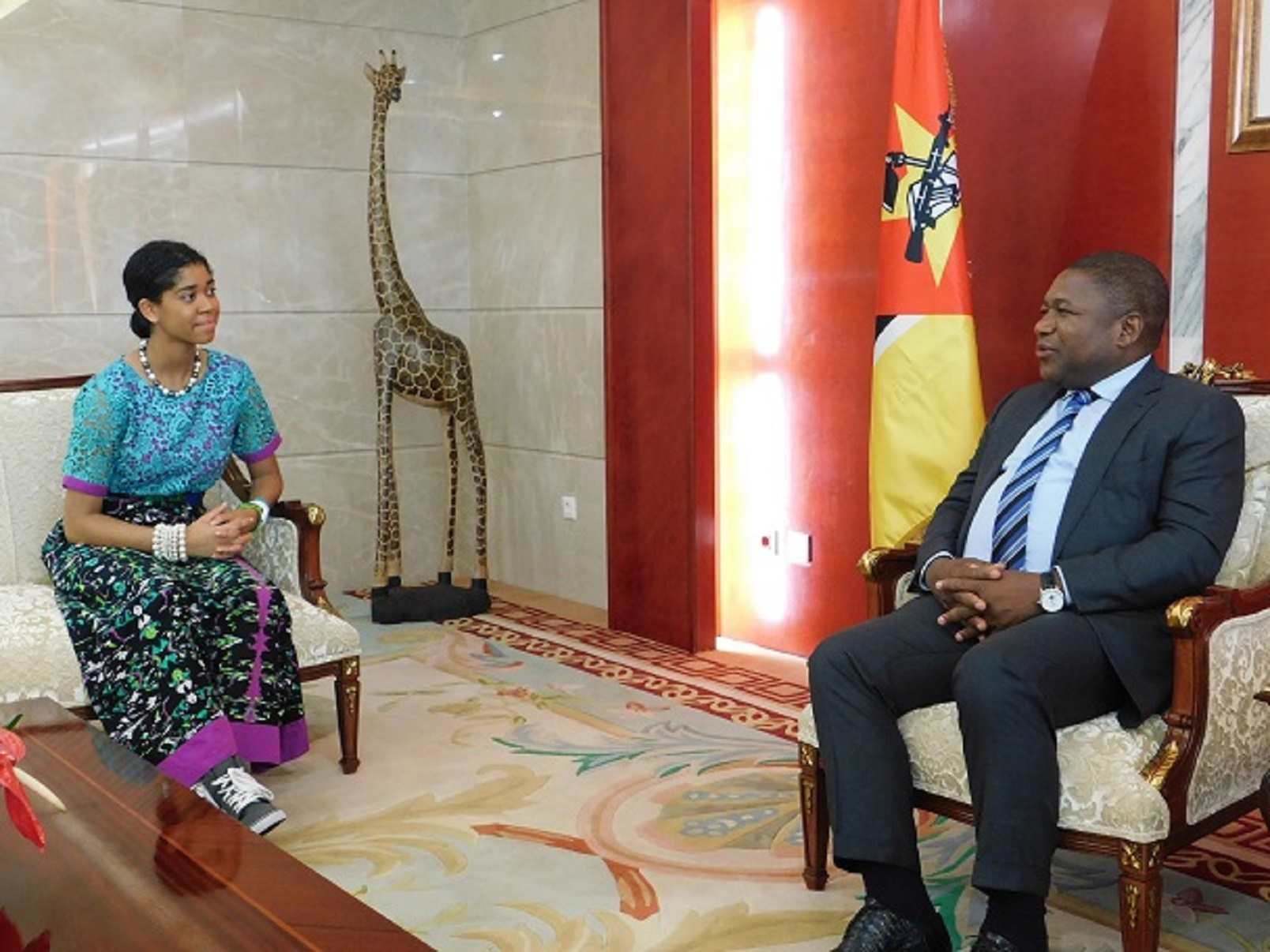
Meeting with President Filipe Nyusi of Mozambique in Maputo

A UNICEF report identified Mozambique as having one of the highest rates of girl marriage in the world, with 48% of the country's women married before the age of 18 and the consequences are very damaging to the nations human capital development. However, in recognition of her work in fighting the incidence of girl marriage in her country, Zuriel Oduwole presented her annual DUSUSU Award to Mozambique's First Lady H.E. Mrs. Isaura Nyusi in March 2018 in Maputo, and later met personally with the country's leader H.E. President Filipe Nyusi a few hours later. Zuriel presses for stronger measures that encourages girl education and tackles the girl marriage epidemic. On 15 July 2019, seventeen months after Zuriel's meeting with President Filipe Nyusi, Mozambique's parliament passed a law against child marriage by voting to criminalize child marriage, a major victory in the quest for universal girls education in the SADC country, and a strong example for other countries in the region to follow. That decision by Mozambique suddenly changed the lives and trajectory of more than 1.1 million young girls across the country.

One of the legacies of the eleven year Sierra Leone civil war from 1991 to 2002 was the systematic abuse of young and teenage girls by younger and older men, that quickly became a culture long after the war. Because girls were still seen as spoils of war, educating them was no longer a priority, until the new government of President Julius Maada Bio in 2018 introduced free education for all primary and secondary school students to gently reverse this trend. Accompanied by Sierra Leones First Lady Fatima Maada Bio, Zuriel addressed 20,000 girls at the Freetown Stadium and 250 paramount chiefs on 13 December 2019, showing herself to them as an example of what an educated girl can do if unhindered. She hoped the chiefs would begin to discourage girl marriage on return to their various communities. She also shared her ideas on e-learning during her meeting with President Julius Bio and first lady Fatima Bio, at the second launch of a national 'Hands Off Our Girls' campaign across the country, a social program aimed at discouraging the abuse of teenage girls.

== Redefining primary education methods - school vs. education ==
The UNICEF December 2018 report on education trends indicated that Africa's most populous country - Nigeria, with a population of over 200 million had seen its number of out of school children rise from 10.5 million to 13.2 million. This alarming statistic meant more traditional and non-traditional methods of educating children were needed to stem the tide. In line with this goal, Zuriel met in February 2020 with Governor Babajide Sanwo-Olu of Lagos State, the country's most populous state with more than 20 million inhabitants, to share her story in using multimedia and digital creatives as an education platform and subject for older girls who had aged out of school, but were unemployed. It was another way of effectively reducing the growing number of out of school children, including vulnerable teenage girls, by teaching them non-traditional education skills such as film editing and creative programs.

Understanding the non-traditional reasons why some girls across Africa are not educated, Zuriel visited schools in various townships in South Africa including Alexandria and Soweto, speaking to more than 2000 girls about the importance and value of staying in school. Creating a partnership with a Femcare manufacturer from South Africa, she delivered products to dozens of girls across the Gauteng province, to ensure that female students really do stay, in school.

In recognition of her approach to empowering young girls in Africa and the Caribbean via her emphasis on differentiating between 'schooling and education' in policy planning, The Education University of Hong Kong invited her as their keynote speaker for the December 2020 annual international conference on gender and education. She shared her insights and offered solutions to the many cultural, economic and social factors that denies girls the same formal education opportunities as boys, refencing challenges pointed out by the Brookings Institution and her own study of adolescents girls, across Africa and Asia, including Cambodia, South Africa, Ghana, Nepal and India

Youth Voice & The State of California - World's 6th Largest Economy

Zuriel has always seen a connection between the power of youth, global affairs, leadership, and the ability to address some of the worlds pressing social and development problems. She has met personally with 31 world leaders since the age of 10, to create and find solutions to some of these problems. Having shared the stage with Bill & Melinda Gates, and Ndaba Mandela at a youth rally where 500,000 youths turned up in Paris in April 2017. A month later, in May 2017, France elected its youngest leader in 39-year-old Emmanuel Macron Zuriel experienced at first-hand the power of youth in deciding a nation's future.

On July 1, 2021, the worlds 6th largest economy - The State of California, where Zuriel was born and raised, announced a special election to either keep its current leader [Governor Gavin Newsome], or replace him. Understanding the power and voice of youth of which she is one, Zuriel released a statewide video, talking to Californians about her 18-year journey and speaking about the need for youths to get involved in charting the future of the state, and by default, the country. Immediately, media, from across California to Canada, to the United Kingdom began reporting that 18-year-old Zuriel Oduwole was entering the California Governor's race. Instead, Zuriel made it clear she was not running and for 2 simple reasons. First, she was a full time University student, and second, she would need to raise a lot of money by appealing to people and soliciting donations, just to tell or show what she was capable of or what she is able to do, when she had been doing the same things quietly, globally and successfully without spending a penny, for the last 8 years. She didn't understand that logic behind such political accoutrements of spending and profligacy, when people were hungry, homeless and in need of immediate medical attention statewide and across the United States.

Qatar Foundation & Global Education Development

For the Qatar Foundation's December 2021 bi-annual WISE education summit, Oduwole was invited to share the success story of her 'alternative education' model and initiative that teaches real world skills such as basic film making to young people who are out of traditional schools and classrooms. She shared that these initiatives on a larger national and regional scale would greatly reduce the annual number of hundreds of millions of out of school children across the globe.

Saudi Arabia and The MiSK Foundation Global Youth Index

Recognized as an emerging thought leader in global development, Zuriel was a keynote speaker and panelist at the Misk Foundation 10th anniversary speaker series in Riyadh, speaking on the global youth index. She enunciated three reasons why the worlds youth voice should be included in the management of global affairs as 1) taking good risks 2) having no agendas except problem solving and 3) driven and fueled by sheer creativity in crafting solutions

Discovering A Confluence Between Climate and Education

As a believer in the power of youths in bringing a fresh approach to solving many of the world's challenges, Zuriel saw the need to engage with world leaders to understand first-hand the effects of climate change on their countries education systems to foster the development of practical solutions via what she terms a 'fair participation and narrative engagement' at global events such as COP. She met in September 2022 with the Prime Minister of Grenada The Honorable Dickon Mitchel, Prime Minister of Bahamas The Honorable Philip Davis and the Prime Minister of St Kitts & Nevis The Honorable Terrance Drew, in this quest using education as a clear segue in defining a change of narrative. Sharing her insights at the 2022 Global Citizens Festival in New York central park, she also sees the power of an educated girl and the voice of youth as a necessary partner in the transformation of many inequalities.

== Awards and recognitions ==
In October 2013, Oduwole was bestowed with an honorary ambassador title in Tanzania by Salma Kikwete, and a computer lab in one of the country's schools was named after her. Also that year she was listed in the New African Magazine's list of "100 Most Influential People in Africa". On 21 April 2014, Oduwole was listed as the most Powerful 11 year old in the world by New York Business Insider's in their listing of "World's Most Powerful Person at Every Age". In February 2015, Elle Magazine listed her in their annual feature of "33 Women Who Changed The World", alongside Fed Reserve Chairwoman Janet Yellen and President of General Motors, Mary Barra.

On 12 March 2016, Zuriel won the "Woman on The Rise" category at the 2016 edition of the "New African Women Awards". In August 2016 at age 14, Forbes Afrique which is distributed across all 23 Francophone African countries as well as France, Belgium and Switzerland, featured her in their annual Africa's 100 Most Influential Women's list, alongside the President of Liberia, Ellen Johnson Sirleaf and Ameenah Gurib, President of Mauritius.^{[27]}

In September 2017, The New York Times featured her growing work in the area of girls education advocacy and development programs to preventing early girl marriage on the African continent, in their segment - Women In The World.

Following the release of her short documentary film in February 2019 on the centenary life of Madiba, she was honored for her humanitarian work by the Nelson Mandela Foundation in March 2019 in Johannesburg. It included a private tour of Mr. Mandela's personal archives and a stop over in his last office.

In recognition of her various development works across the globe especially in the area of girls education, the City of Beverly Hills chose her as one of 28 Americans to feature each day of February 2021, for the annual US Black History Month

On September 9, 2022, at an event in New York, the 8th Secretary General of the United Nations, Ban Ki-moon, presented Zuriel Oduwole with the Ban Ki-moon leadership award for her work in girls' education advocacy, gender development, her film making programs for unemployed older girls, and her research on the confluence between climate and education development in children.

It was for her more than a decade long work since the age of 10, influencing discussions on education, actively engaging in global diplomatic efforts in peace mediation, working to create opportunities for marginalized communities via a film making class, and in promoting meaningful change, that she was nominated for the 2025 Nobel Peace Prize.

== Works ==
- The Ghana Revolution (2012)
- The 1963 OAU Formation (2013)
- Technology in Educational Development (2014)
- A Promising Africa (2014)
- Follow The Ball For Education (2017)
- Goree Island - Senegal, A Solemn Story (2019)
- Nelson Mandela - A Centenary Life of Giving (2019)
