= San Salvatore Monferrato =

- Comune
- Comune di San Salvatore Monferrato
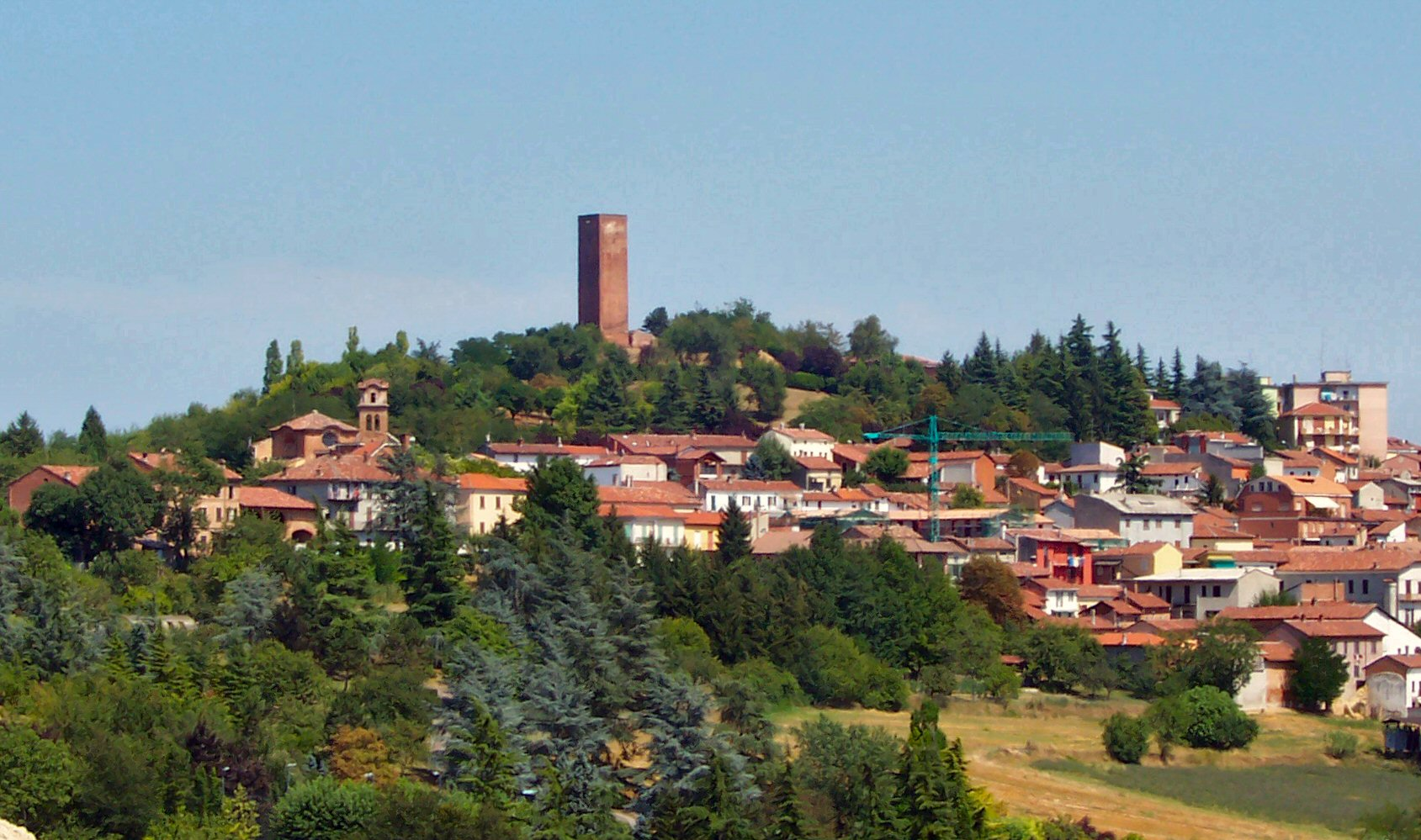

- Coat of arms

- Location within Italy Location within Piedmont
- Coordinates: 44°59′42″N 8°34′1″E
- Country: Italy
- Region: Piedmont
- Province: Alessandria (AL)
- Frazioni: Fosseto, Frescondino, Piazzolo, Salcido, Valdolenga, Valparolo

Government
  - Mayor: Enrico Beccaria

Area
  - Total: 31.65 km^{2} (12.22 sq mi)
- Elevation: 205 m (673 ft)

Population (30 November 2017)
  - Total: 4,261
  - Density: 134.6/km^{2} (348.7/sq mi)
- Demonym: Sansalvatoresi
- Time zone: UTC+1 (CET)
  - Summer (DST): UTC+2 (CEST)
- Postal code: 15046
- Dialing code: 0131

San Salvatore Monferrato is a comune (municipality) in the Province of Alessandria in the Italian region Piedmont, located about 70 kilometres (43 mi) east of Turin and about 10 kilometres (6 mi) northwest of Alessandria.

== Main sights ==
The tower of the Paleologi was erected for Theodore II, Marquess of Montferrat.

Other sights include the 16th century churches of San Martino e San Siro. the communal cemetery of the town is home to the grave of Paolo Provera, surnamed Tantasà, an example of outsider art.

== People ==
- Iginio Ugo Tarchetti (1839–1869), a novelist, also poet and journalist, and part of the Milanese Scapigliatura.
