= Muscle (musical) =

- Music: William Finn
- Lyrics: Ellen Fitzhugh
- Book: James Lapine
- Basis: Muscle: Confessions of an Unlikely Bodybuilder by Samuel Wilson Fussell
- Productions: 1995 New York workshop; 2001 Chicago world premiere

Muscle is a musical with a book by James Lapine, music by William Finn, and lyrics by Ellen Fitzhugh, based on Samuel Wilson Fussell's 1991 memoir Muscle: Confessions of an Unlikely Bodybuilder. The project originated in the early 1990s as a one-act musical Lapine developed with Stephen Sondheim as a companion piece to what became Passion; when Sondheim's contribution grew into a full-length show, his work on Muscle was abandoned. Lapine later developed the piece into a full-length musical with Finn and Fitzhugh. An invitation-only workshop was staged in New York City in 1995, and the completed musical received its world premiere at Chicago's Pegasus Players in 2001.

== Sondheim and Lapine one-act ==
Muscle originated in the early 1990s as one of two planned one-act musicals by Lapine and Sondheim, intended to be staged together as a single evening. The companion piece, based on Iginio Tarchetti's 1869 novel Fosca, was written primarily by Sondheim and developed into the full-length musical Passion (1994); the Muscle half, based on Fussell's bodybuilding memoir, was to be written largely by Lapine. Lapine described the two pieces as sharing a common theme of beauty and self-image, and characterized Fussell's memoir as "a metaphor for the eighties."

In his own account, published in 2011, Sondheim wrote that he had originally proposed Passion to Lapine as a one-act piece that would need a companion, and that Lapine, drawn to Fussell's memoir for its similar concern with the effect of physical appearance on both its subject and observers, proposed pairing it with Muscle. Sondheim wrote music and lyrics for a single continuous opening sequence—comprising a montage titled "Opening Sequence (Poses)" and a number titled "No Problem"—before abandoning the piece, by his own account unfinished, as Passion grew from a one-act into a full-length work. He then handed the project to Lapine, who took it to William Finn.

== Development with Finn and Fitzhugh ==
By November 1995 Lapine had returned to the project separately with composer William Finn and lyricist Ellen Fitzhugh, retaining his own book. Lapine asked Finn to write both music and lyrics, but Finn chose to write only the music; freed of lyric-writing, he found the process "like a vacation," and finished seventeen songs in eighteen months. Jason Robert Brown, who would go on to arrange Finn's A New Brain, also worked on the project.

An invitation-only workshop, produced by the Shubert Organization, was staged in November 1995 at the Tribeca Performing Arts Center in New York, directed by Lapine, with musical staging by Joey McKneely and musical direction by John McDaniel. Design consultants included Heidi Landesman (scenic), Ann Hould-Ward (costume), Peter Kaczorowski (lighting), and Dan Moses Schreier (sound). The cast was led by Jarrod Emick as Max Riddle, with Jessica Walter, Dennis Parlato, Karen Ziemba, Norm Lewis, Chuck Cooper, Kevin Chamberlin, Christopher Sieber, Sarah Uriarte Berry, William Parry, Stacey Logan, Denise Faye, Brenda Braxton, Darcie Roberts, Stephen Lee Anderson, Brooks Ashmanskas, John Christopher Jones, and Jimmy Noonan. A filming of the workshop, dated November 30, 1995, is held in the Theatre on Film and Tape Archive at the New York Public Library for the Performing Arts. The Shubert Organization, which had funded the workshop, did not consider the piece suited to Broadway, though Finn later recalled that a New York reading of the show had been "wildly received."

=== Musical numbers (1995 workshop) ===
- "Nothing Like a Beginning"
- "As Far As the Eye Can See"
- "Terrors of the Heart"
- "The Arnold Metaphor"
- "Anyone at All"
- "Theory"
- "Theory (Reprise)"
- "You're an Athlete"
- "Now I Understand"
- "California"
- "You're an Athlete (Reprise)"
- "Beauty"
- "Terrors of the Heart (Reprise)"
- "Real Life"
- "A Nice Thing"
- "Almost Perfect"
- "Nothing Like a Beginning (Reprise)"

(Note: Song list per a private archival audio recording of the workshop, catalogued by CastAlbums.org; no commercial recording of the workshop was released.)

== 2001 Chicago premiere ==
After the 1995 workshop Lapine continued developing the piece independently until Sondheim, who had had several of his own musicals staged at Chicago's Pegasus Players and had been in residence there for its 1999 American premiere of Saturday Night, suggested the non-Equity company to him; Lapine called Pegasus's producing director, Arlene Crewdson, who agreed to schedule the show for the 2000–2001 season, later remarking that a call from a writer of Lapine's stature was not one she felt she could turn down.

Even so, as late as September 2000, several months after Pegasus had announced the show for its coming season, Finn told Playbill that he did not know whether the production would go forward; asked whether he seemed disconnected from the project, he replied that he had simply written the music and that it "was really easy."

Previewing the show days before it opened, Richard Christiansen described it in the Chicago Tribune as one of the more anticipated new productions of the season, noting the roughly seven years the piece had taken to reach the stage and the pedigree of its creative team. The production, directed by Gareth Hendee, a longtime associate of Lapine, with choreography by Ann Filmer and musical direction by Jon Steinhagen, (Note: Playbill, Variety, and the Chicago Reader all give "Jon Steinhagen"; Dietz's The Complete Book of 2000s Broadway Musicals gives "Joe Steinhagen"; and Windy City Times gives "John Steinhagen.") was capitalized at $100,000; previews began June 5, 2001, the production officially opened June 13, and it closed July 22 at the O'Rourke Center for the Performing Arts on the campus of Truman College, its sole engagement.

The cast was led by Rob Hancock as Max Riddle, with Anita Hoffman and Dan Loftus as his parents, Audrey Yeck as Alice, and Chuck Karvelas as Mousie, alongside Jane Blass, Cory James, Timothy Jon, Carrie McNulty, Henry Michael Odum, Brad Potts, Chavez Ravine, Michael Reyes, Eddie Schumacher, Kate Staiger, Joel Sutliffe, and Megan Van De Hey. The creative team included set designer Jack Magaw, costume designer Nan Zabriskie, lighting designer David Lander, and sound designer Steve Mezger.

=== Musical numbers (2001 Chicago production) ===
Act One

- "Nothing Like a Beginning"
- "Street Scene"
- "This Is Not Cornell"
- "Arnold Schwarzenegger"
- "The Brain and the Body"
- "Never Look Back"
- "Muscle"
- "Theory"
- "A Day at the Office"
- "Theory" (reprise)
- "Athlete"
- "Now I Understand"
- "California"

Act Two

- "Athlete" (reprise)
- "Beauty"
- "The Brain and the Body" (reprise)
- "A Nice Thing"
- "Nothing Like a Beginning" (reprise)
- "Judges"
- "Almost Perfect"
- "Now I Understand" (reprise)
- Finale

(Note: Several numbers from the 1995 workshop were retitled or reworked for Chicago—for example, "You're an Athlete" became "Athlete" and "The Arnold Metaphor" appears to correspond to "Arnold Schwarzenegger"—while others, including "Street Scene," "This Is Not Cornell," the title song "Muscle," "Never Look Back," "A Day at the Office," and "Judges," do not appear in the 1995 song list at all and appear to have been added during the show's further development.)

=== Plot ===
Max Riddle, a 22-year-old, prize-winning scholar of American literature just out of an Ivy League college, takes a publishing job in New York City. Dissatisfied with his physique and unsettled by urban life, he takes up weightlifting at a gym, where he falls in with a circle of bodybuilders; his training intensifies until he travels to California to compete, becoming involved with steroid use before reconsidering the path he has taken. Lapine described his adaptation as broadly faithful to Fussell's memoir, condensed and omitting some of its more extreme material, and characterized the story as one of a man who had built an emotional defense around himself before bodybuilding forced him to confront parts of his character he had long denied.

=== Critical reception ===
Reviews of the Chicago premiere were mixed, with several critics praising Finn's score while faulting Lapine's book and the production's development. In Variety, Chris Jones found the show's concept "intriguing" and praised the opening number, "Nothing Like a Beginning," and "The Brain and the Body," but felt the production undercut its own more serious ambitions and that most of the book would need to be reworked. Reviewing the show, Christiansen judged it "still looking for its true voice," finding the opening strong and singling out "The Brain and the Body" and "A Nice Thing" for praise while judging parts of the storytelling underdeveloped and some of the humor weak. Albert Williams, writing in the Chicago Reader, praised Finn's "propulsive rhythms and fertile melodic sense" and Fitzhugh's deadpan wit, but found Lapine's script populated by generic types rather than psychologically specific characters. Jonathan Abarbanel, in Windy City Times, likewise praised the stylistic range of Finn's score—moving between operetta-style patter, Latin rhythms, and ballad forms—while faulting the show's underdeveloped storytelling, including a compressed timeline he found implausible for Max's physical transformation; he judged the production a promising but unfinished early draft of what could become a stronger show. Writing in a Chicago theatre column, critic Lucia Mauro took a harsher view, arguing that the show neglected the metaphorical heart of its subject and finding the result "emotionally flabby."

Reviewers disagreed on the effectiveness of the padded costume used to represent Max's bodybuilder physique, with Christiansen finding it convincing and Mauro finding it unconvincing.
