= Salvatore Farina (novelist) =

Italian novelist

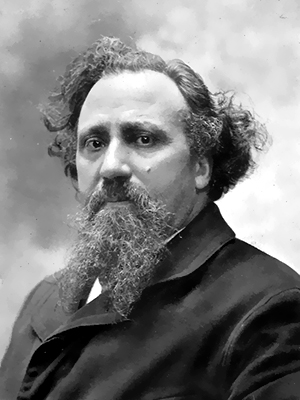
- Born: 10 January 1846; Sorso, Sardinia, Italy
- Died: 15 December 1918 (aged 72)
- Occupation: novelist

Salvatore Farina (10 January 1846 – 15 December 1918) was an Italian novelist whose style of sentimental humour has been compared to that of Charles Dickens. He was nominated for the Nobel Prize in Literature three times.

== Biography ==
A Sardinian by birth, he graduated in law at the University of Turin before moving to Milan, where he became closely associated with the Scapigliatura, and wrote for the Rivista minima and Nuova antologia and edited the Gazzetta musicale. He wrote a chapter of Tarchetti's Fosca (1869) to ensure that his dying and destitute friend was paid for its serialization. He suffered from a long period of amnesia, subsequently reconstructing his life in three volumes of autobiography (1910–15).

== Life ==
Born in the Sardinian town of Sorso, he studied law at Turin and Pavia before moving to Milan and taking up literature, remaining there for the rest of his life. The late nineteenth-century English novelist George Gissing thought that his novella Si Muore, read by him in January 1890, was 'far more interesting than I expected; in fact excellently written'.

== Works ==
- Il tesoro di Donnina (1873)
- Amore bendato (1875)
- Capelli biondi (1876)
- Mio figlio! (1877–1881)
- Si Muore: L'ultima battaglia di Prete Agostino (1886)
- Frutti proibiti
- Un tiranno al bagni di mare
- Cuore e blasone
- Due amori
- Amore ha cento occhi
- Per la vita e per la morte
- La mia giornata, a trilogy:
  - Dall'alba al meriggio (1910)
  - Care ombre (1913)
  - Dal meriggio al tramonto (1915)

== Bibliography ==
- Convegno Salvatore Farina: la figura e il ruolo a 150 anni dalla nascita (1996 : Sorso, Italy)
