= Cagna =

Cagna is an Italian surname. Notable people with the surname include:

- Achille Giovanni Cagna (1847–1931), Italian writer
- Diego Cagna (born 1970), Argentine football coach
- Mario Cagna (1911–1986), Italian prelate
- Stefano Cagna (1901–1940), Italian aviator

== See also ==
- La cagna
- Cagno (surname)
