= Nathalie Beatrice Chinje =

Cameroonian entrepreneur

Nathalie Beatrice Chinje (also known as Dr. Nath) is an entrepreneur and international consultant. She is the founder and CEO of the company Upbeat Marketing, and has been actively working to forward private sector development, foreign direct investment, and female entrepreneurship on the African continent for over 20 years. Dr. Nath is a member of the Advocacy and Communications Committee of the South African Qualifications Authority (SAQA) Board, an Expert for the African Union Commission (AUC) and the United Nations Economic Commission for Africa (UNECA), and consults for the African Development Bank (AFDB).

== Professional life ==
=== Career ===
As an international consultant, Dr. Nath advises leading public and private entities in such sectors as financial services, information, communication and technology as well as retail and mining on the topics of entrepreneurship, women economic empowerment, gender mainstreaming and private sector development in Africa. She consults for the African Development Bank (AFDB) since 2016. She is also a board member of the Business Women’s Association of South Africa, which has over 25,000 members and chairs the organization’s brand, marketing and communication committee.

Dr. Nath has been working internationally on developing business and trade relationships with clients in the United States, Europe and Africa. She has also been instrumental in creating mutually beneficial partnerships and opportunities, facilitating market entry and providing strategic marketing, business management, trade and technical assistance for these organizations and their affiliates in Africa.

Dr. Nathalie Chinje founded the company UPbeat Marketing in 2004.

In addition, Dr. Nath is a sought speaker on the topics of Entrepreneurship, African Business Women, Global Business and Global Supply Chain, Trading in Africa, and Women's Economic Emancipation.

== Personal life ==
Born in Cameroon, Dr. Nath has eight siblings. As a young woman, she attended the Lycée de Jeunes Filles (Lycée de New-Bell) in Douala.

She is now the mother of two daughters, and they live in South Africa.

== Accomplishments ==
While leading her company, Upbeat Marketing, and in partnership with the China Europe International Business School, they have launched the CEIBS Women Entrepreneurship and Leadership for Africa (WELA) in October 2017, a program that aims to teach women how to become effective entrepreneurs and where they are provided with coaching from other women entrepreneurs.

She was a recipient of the 2017 Global Business Leadership Award (awarded on 21 Sept.17 in New York City, USA) and a finalist for 2017 New African Woman Award – Business Category by New African Woman and IC Publications (UK).

== Research ==
- The Economic Impact of MTN's Involvement
- Continuous mobile banking usage and relationship commitment – A multi-country assessment
- The Influence of Trust and Ease of Use of Social Media Platforms on South Africa’s Generation Y Social Media Use Intention and Information Sharing
- Extending the four-stage brand loyalty framework in African Telecoms
- Harnessing Digital Marketing To Access Markets: Opportunities For Africa’s SMEs
- Digital natives and information sharing on social media platforms : implications for managers
- Strategic Marketing
- Consumers’ perceptions of mobile banking continuous usage in Finland and South Africa
- Customer Relationship Management (CRM) Implementation within the Banking and Mobile Telephony Sectors of Nigeria and South Africa
- The economic impact of MTN's involvement in Cameroon
