= Jere Shea =

American actor

- Born: June 14, 1965 (age 59); Boston, Massachusetts, United States
- Occupation: Actor
- Years active: 1992–present

Jere Shea (born June 14, 1965) is an American actor. He is best known for originating the role of Giorgio in the Broadway production of Passion, for which he received a nomination for the Tony Award for Best Actor in a Musical. Shea left acting in 1998 in order to spend more time with his family, working as deputy chief of staff to Massachusetts Governor Paul Cellucci among other positions. He returned to acting in a 2016 concert production of The Secret Garden. He starred in the 2019 Showtime series City on a Hill.

== Theatre credits ==
| Year | Title | Role | Venue | Awards |
|---|---|---|---|---|
| 1992 | As You Like It | Amiens | Delacorte Theater | |
| 1992 | Guys and Dolls | Various | Martin Beck Theatre | |
| 1993 | Damn Yankees | Joe Hardy | Old Globe Theatre | |
| 1994 | Passion | Giorgio | Plymouth Theatre | Theatre World Award (winner), Tony Award for Best Actor in a Musical (nominee), Drama Desk Award for Outstanding Actor in a Musical (nominee) |
| 1996 | Overtime | Bassanio | New York City Center | |
| 1997 | High Society | Mike Connor | American Conservatory Theater | |
| 1998 | You Never Can Tell | Bohun | Laura Pels Theatre | |
| 2016 | The Secret Garden | Ben Weatherstaff | Lincoln Center | |
