= Sweet Pea (film) =

1981 Italian comedy-drama film

- Directed by: Peter Del Monte
- Written by: Bernardino Zapponi; Peter Del Monte
- Cinematography: Giuseppe Lanci
- Edited by: Sergio Montanari
- Music by: Fiorenzo Carpi
- Release date: 1981
- Running time: 105 minutes
- Country: Italy
- Language: Italian

Sweet Pea (Italian: Piso pisello) is a 1981 Italian comedy-drama film co-written and directed by Peter Del Monte. It was entered into the main competition at the 38th Venice International Film Festival.

== Cast ==
- Luca Porro as Oliviero
- Fabio Peraboni as Cristiano 'Pisello'
- Valeria D'Obici as the mother
- Alessandro Haber as the father
- Victoria Gadsden as May
- Piero Mazzarella as Bamba
- Eros Pagni as Corazza
- Leopoldo Trieste as the tramp
