= A Promising Africa =

- Directed by: Zuriel Oduwole
- Produced by: Zuriel Oduwole
- Release date: 2014
- Countries: Nigeria; United Kingdom; South Africa
- Language: English

A Promising Africa is a 2014 self-produced documentary film by Zuriel Oduwole.

== Background ==
Released in November 2014 at the Film House Cinema in Lagos, the A Promising Africa series was screened in five countries over three years. A Promising Africa made Oduwole the world's youngest film maker to commercially release a self-produced film.
