= New African =

English-language monthly news magazine based in London

- Editor: Anver Versi
- Categories: News magazine
- Frequency: Monthly
- Circulation: 40,218 / month (2012)
- Publisher: IC Publications
- Founded: 1966; 60 years ago
- Company: IC Publications
- Country: United Kingdom
- Based in: London
- Language: English
- Website: newafricanmagazine.com
- ISSN: 0142-9345

New African is an English-language monthly news magazine based in London. Published since 1966, it is read by many people across the African continent and the African diaspora. It claims to be the oldest pan-African monthly in English, as well as "the bestselling pan-African magazine". It is published by IC Publications, which also publishes African Banker, New African Woman and African Business.

== History ==
The magazine was founded in 1966 under the name African Development. In 1977 it was renamed New African Development, a name that it retained until the following year. In 1978, it was rebranded New African.

== Event production ==
=== COMESA Investment Forum ===
IC Publishing and specifically New African magazine served as the host and promoter of a number of trade and investment fairs and/or conferences on behalf of COMESA (Common Market for Eastern and Southern Africa). In particular, the COMESA Investment Forum meetings held in Egypt and the United Arab Emirates have involved a high amount of pro-Chinese programming and media content. Of note, the financial "arm" of COMESA that manages COMESA's trade agreements and investment portfolios is the Preferential Trade Area Bank (PTA Bank), of which the sole non-African member and largest non-regional shareholding state is China.

=== AFRICASEA Business Forum ===
IC Publishing is also the organizer and promoter of the Africa and Southeast Asia Business Forum, an annual business conference focused on Sino-African trade relationships. Of note, the primary financial supporter and endorser of the AFRICASEA Forum is BRICS.

== Other languages ==
In 2007, IC Publications launched a French-language edition of the New African entitled Le Magazine De l'Afrique ("The Magazine of Africa"), which features content relating to Francophone Africa.

== List of editors ==
- 1970 March–July: Editor director - Richard Hall, Editor - Alan Rake
- 1970 August: Editor - Alan Rake
- 1977 January: Managing editor - Alan Rake, Editor - Sam Uba, Publisher - Afif Ben Yedder
- 1978 January–April: Executive director - David Coetzee, Managing editor - Alan Rake
- 1978 May: Editor-in-chief - Peter Enahoro
- 1980 January–October: Editor-publisher - Peter Enahoro
- 1980 November: Editor-in-chief - M. Mlamali Adam
- 1981 February: Acting editor-in-chief - Alan Rake, Deputy Editor - Baffour Ankomah
- 1995 January: Editor-in-chief - Alan Rake, Deputy editor - Baffour Ankomah
- 1999 July/August: Editor - Baffour Ankomah
- 2018 July/August: Editor - Anver Versi
