= Alan Rake =

Twenty Group of chairman

Alan Rake (born 1933) is an English journalist and writer about Africa.

== Life ==
Alan Rake was educated at Oxford University, where he studied Philosophy, politics and economics. He was invited by Jim Bailey, also educated at Oxford, to work for Drum magazine. In the late 1950s he opened a Nairobi office for the magazine, working as its East African editor. In the early 1960s he briefly worked for Drum in South Africa, and as General Manager of Drum in West Africa, before continuing to work for East African Drum as a London-based editor.

In 1968 he was briefly editor of the newsletter Africa Confidential.

In 1969 he started editing the monthly London-based African Development magazine, later renamed New African. He remained there as editor until his retirement in 1999.

== Works ==
- (with John Dickie) Who's who in Africa; the political, military and business leaders of Africa. London: African Buyer and Trader, 1973.
- Who's Who in Africa: leaders for the 1990s. Metuchen, N.J.: Scarecrow Press, 1992.
- 100 Great Africans. Metuchen, N.J.: Scarecrow Press, 1994.
