= Anver Versi =

Kenyan-born journalist and editor

- Born: Anwarali Versi; Nairobi, Kenya
- Education: Aga Khan School; University of Warwick; University of Nairobi; King's College, Cambridge
- Occupations: Journalist and editor

Anwarali Versi, professionally known as Anver Versi, is a Kenyan-born journalist who is editor-in-chief of New African magazine, based in London. He began his journalistic career in Nairobi, before moving to England, where he eventually worked for several UK-based pan-African publications, including African Business and African Banker. Other newspapers and journals for which he has written include The Times, The Independent, The Wall Street Journal, the Chicago Tribune and the International Herald Tribune.

== Biography ==
Born in Nairobi, Kenya, Versi started his education at the Aga Khan School, Mombasa, and read Political Science, Economics, and English at the University of Nairobi. He would go on to further studies in the UK at the University of Warwick and King's College, Cambridge.

Versi began his career as a journalist working with the Nation Group of newspapers in Nairobi, before moving to London in 1983, where he was a sub-editor for The Guardian and the Financial Times, and was also employed by UK-based African magazines such as Africa Journal and Drum (West Africa). Working for more than 30 years with IC Publications, he was the founding editor of African Banker magazine, and in 1994 became editor of African Business and as of 2018 is editor-in-chief of New African magazine (where he was formerly deputy editor from 1983 to 1994).

== Selected bibliography ==
- Football in Africa, Collins, 1986, ISBN 978-0003278088
- Search for Africa's Political Identity, Macmillan
