= Cagno (surname) =

Cagno is an Italian surname. Notable people with the surname include:

- Alessandro Cagno (1883–1971), Italian racing driver, aviation pioneer, and powerboat racer
- Gregg Cagno (born 1969), American songwriter and performer

== See also ==
- Cagna
