= Versi =

Versi is a surname. Notable people with this surname include:

- Ahmed J. Versi, Muslim editor, publisher, journalist, and pharmacist
- Anver Versi, Kenyan journalist
- Miqdaad Versi, Muslim activist

== See also ==
- Hersi
