= Achille Giovanni Cagna =

Italian writer

- Born: September 8, 1847; Vercelli, Italy
- Died: February 23, 1931 (aged 83); Vercelli, Italy
- Occupation: Writer (novelist)
- Writing career
- Period: 19th, 20th century
- Genres: History, fiction
- Literary movement: Scapigliatura

Achille Giovanni Cagna (September 8, 1847 – February 23, 1931) was an Italian writer. He was known primarily for fiction but published two volumes of poetry as well as a number of plays.

== Biography ==
Cagna was born in the northern Italian town of Vercelli. He attended a technical school but was expelled after which he began to work with his father as a contractor. He had a passion for literature and started to write in his early twenties. He was inspired by some influential friendships, such as that of Giuseppe Cesare Abba, Edmondo De Amicis and especially Giovanni Faldella.

He visited Milan frequently where he met authors such as Medoro Savini and Antonio Ghislanzoni. His first project, Falene dell'amore e Un bel sogno (1871), was a sentimental story with moving and sometimes pathetic descriptions that emerged in the two stories. He wrote several narratives including Provincials (1886), Mountaineers ciabattoni (1888), The revenge of love (1891), and Contrada dei gatti (1924). With the publication of the Provincials, the Faldellian influence became clearer. In this book, the writer focused his attention on provincial life, characterized by the fresco of the urban context seen from its particular angle, expressed thanks to the taste of impressions and a colorful language embellished with lexical inventions sometimes tending to crudeness.

Cagna was a member of the Scapigliatura society, an Italian version of Bohemianism. In his works the life of a certain petty-bourgeois world is vividly represented. From his friend Giovanni Faldella he derived a stylistic-linguistic research in an expressionistic key. What is considered his masterpiece: Alpinisti Ciabattoni, was reevaluated by Croce, Gobetti and Contini, above all for his linguistic innovations, which followed the creative path opened by the Provincials, extending it from the point of view of inspiration. The book tells the misadventures of a couple of merchants on holiday.

In The Revenge of Love, the literary dimension of Cagna was enriched by realistic derivations and nuances.

The writer experimented with various plays and also published two volumes of verses.

== Works ==
- Maria ovvero Così cammina il mondo. Dramma in quattro atti, Milano, Carlo Barbini, 1869.
- Tempesta sui fiori. Bozzetti sociali, Milano, Carlo Barbini, 1870.
- Un bel sogno. Romanzo, Milano, Carlo Barbini, 1871.
- In società. Commedia in 4 atti, Milano, Carlo Barbini, 1872.
- Don Luigi da Toledo. Melodramma in 3 atti, musica di Giovanni Cerioni, versi di A.G. Cagna, Vercelli, Tipografia Guglielmoni, 1874.
- Povera cetra. Poesie varie, Milano, Carlo Barbini, 1874.
- Serenate. Versi, Milano, Carlo Barbini, 1875.
- Falene dell'amore, Milano, Galli e Omodei, 1878.
- Noviziato di sposa, Milano, Giuseppe Galli, 1881.
- Vecchia ruggine. Commedia in due atti, Milano, Carlo Barbini, 1884.
- Spartaco. Dramma in 5 atti, Milano, Carlo Barbini, 1885.
- Provinciali, Milano, Giuseppe Galli, 1886. Nuova ed.: Roma, Edizioni di storia e letteratura, 2013. ISBN 978-88-6372-529-2.
- Alpinisti ciabattoni, seconda edizione, Milano, Giuseppe Galli, 1888. Nuova ed.: Roma, Elliot, 2013. ISBN 978-88-6192-386-7.
- Presso la culla. Commedia in un atto, Milano, Tip. Edoardo Sonzogno Edit., 1888.
- La rivincita dell'amore, Milano, Giuseppe Galli, 1891. Nuova ed.: Roma, Edizioni di storia e letteratura, 2013. ISBN 978-88-6372-525-4.
- Scena ultima. Bozzetto drammatico, Bergamo, Stab. Tip. Lit. Bolis, 1891.
- Le tentazioni di sor Fiorenzo. Commedia in due atti, Napoli, S. De Angelis, 1892.
- Quando amore spira. Romanzo, Milano, Casa editrice Galli di C. Chiesa e F. Guindani, 1894.
- A volo, Milano, Libreria editrice lombarda, 1905.
- I mendicanti, Milano, A. Barion, 1922.
- Lei voi tu; Vince chi... torna; Presso la culla. Commedie di un atto, Milano, Barion, 1923.
- Contrada dei Gatti. Proiezioni, Milano, A. Barion, 1924.
- L' uomo, lo scrittore. Note e Saggi biografici, Sesto S. Giovanni-Milano, A. Barion, 1926.
- Moscheide, Torino: A. Formica, 1929.
