= African Business =

London-based magazine about business in Africa

- Editor: David Thomas
- Editor-in-Chief: Omar Ben Yedder
- Categories: Business
- Frequency: Monthly
- Publisher: IC Publications
- Total circulation (December 2016): 25,572
- Founder: Afif Ben Yedder
- First issue: January 1982
- Country: UK
- Based in: London
- Language: English, French
- Website: africanbusinessmagazine.com
- ISSN: 0141-3929
- OCLC: 609950292

African Business is an African business magazine published by London-based IC Publications. The current editor is David Thomas.

== History and profile ==
African Business was first published in January 1982. Anver Versi was the first editor of the magazine. Its headquarters are in London. The monthly magazine covers business events across Africa. Special reports discuss specific sectors and industries. As of 2012, the magazine had about 140,000 subscribers. The magazine is published in English and French editions.

The magazine organizes the annual "African Business Awards" event in collaboration with the Commonwealth Business Council. The 2011 event was held in London, England.
