= Giuseppe Aurelio Costanzo =

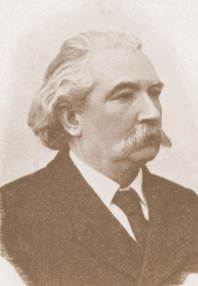

Giuseppe Aurelio Costanzo (6 March 1843 – 14 July 1913) was an Italian writer, professor, and poet.

== Biography ==
He was born in Melilli, province of Siracusa, Sicily. He studied at the University of Naples. In 1869, he published his first work of poetry. In 1871, he moved to Rome to teach literature at the Royal Institute for Women. With the support of De Sanctis and Guido Baccelli, in 1878 he became director. He died in Rome.
