= Iginio Ugo Tarchetti =

Italian author, poet, and journalist

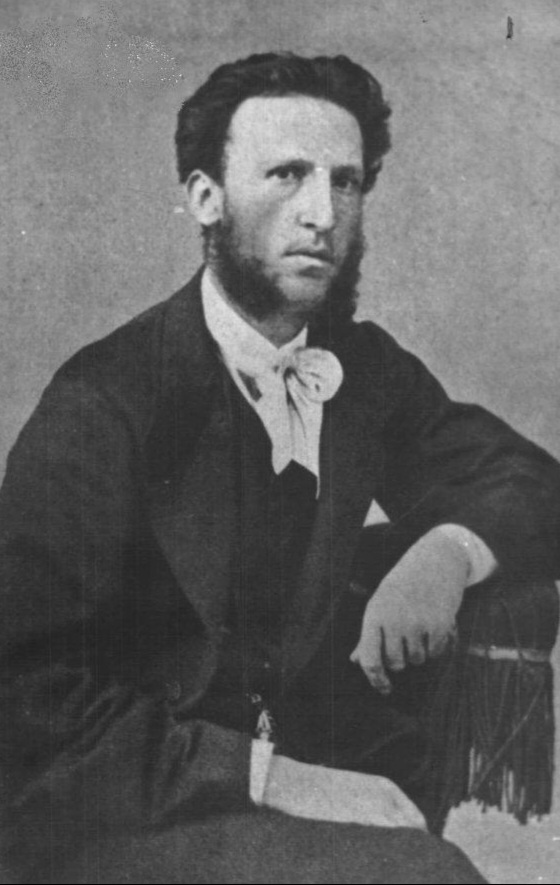
- Iginio Ugo Tarchetti
- Born: 29 June 1839; San Salvatore Monferrato, Grand Duchy of Tuscany
- Died: 25 March 1869 (aged 29); Milan, Kingdom of Italy
- Occupations: author, poet, journalist
- Writing career
- Period: 19th century
- Genre: Gothic fiction
- Notable works: Fantastic Tales; Fosca
- Movement: Scapigliatura

Iginio (or Igino) Ugo Tarchetti (Italian pronunciation: [iˈdʒiːnjo ˈuːɡo tarˈketti]; 29 June 1839 – 25 March 1869) was an Italian author, poet, and journalist of the first generation of Lombard line. Long forgotten by Italian literary critics, Tarchetti's work is undergoing critical reappraisal in recent years. Tarchetti is considered the first practitioner of Gothic fiction in Italy.

== Life ==
Born in San Salvatore Monferrato, his military career was cut short by ill health, and in 1865 he settled in Milan. His experiences as a volunteer officer in the army between 1859 and 1865 led to the novel Una nobile follia (1867), which provides a courageous denunciation of the conscript army at a time when the armed forces were a potent, if fragile, symbol of Italy's Unification. The work caused an uproar in the press, and copies were openly burned at many Italian military barracks.

In his last few years Tarchetti lived a peripatetic existence between Turin and Milan, eventually settling in the latter and working frenetically to earn enough to be a full-time writer. He worked on several newspapers and published a torrent of short stories, novels, and poems.

He also set up two short-lived journals, the Piccolo giornale and Palestra musicale, and contributed to many others. He became one of the leading figures of the Scapigliatura, producing serialized novels and stories which reveal a restless, eclectic personality and aspire, like other works of the group, to deprovincialize Italian literature by turning to foreign literary models. His works reveal the influences of the German Romantics, and particularly of E. T. A. Hoffmann.

The Scapigliati rebelled against late Romantic maudlin poets like Aleardo Aleardi and Giovanni Prati, Italian Catholic tradition and clericalism, and the Italian government's betrayal of the revolutionary roots of the Risorgimento period. They laced their works with protests against capitalism, the Catholic Church, and militarism.

After the social humanitarianism of Paolina: mistero del coperto Figini (1865), Tarchetti introduced the fantastic to the Italian reading public, five of his stories being posthumously collected as Racconti fantastici (1869; Eng. trans. Fantastic Tales, 1992).

Tarchetti contracted tuberculosis and died in poverty in Milan at the age of 29. His last novel, Fosca, written when he was dying, is a study of its eponymous heroine's sexuality and sickness and the morbid attraction–repulsion she holds for the narrator. His close friend Salvatore Farina completed the crucial missing chapter so that Tarchetti could be paid on its serialization.

Tarchetti published a plagiarized translation of "The Mortal Immortal" (1833) by Mary Shelley as "The Elixir of Immortality", with small but significant changes but without attribution. Lawrence Venuti, who discovered the antecedents of "Mortal Immortal" while translating Tarchetti's Fantastic Tales, considers his appropriation as serving the social agenda of Scapigliatura. On the other hand J. D. Beresford's short story Fosca (1896) most probably borrowed from Tarchetti's homonymous novel of 1869.

== Works ==
- Opere, Cappelli, Bologna, 1967.
- Paolina, Mursia, Milano, 1994.
- L'Amore Nell'Arte, Passigli, Firenze, 1992.
- Racconti Fantastici + Racconti Vari, Bompiani, Milano, 1993. Translated by Lawrence Venuti as Fantastic Tales, Mercury House, San Francisco, 1992, ISBN 1-56279-020-X, winner of Bram Stoker Award for Best Fiction Collection.
- Una Nobile Follia, Mondadori, Milano, 2004.
- Fosca, Mondadori, Milano, 1981. Translated by Lawrence Venuti as Passion: A Novel (Mercury House, 1994).

== Adaptations ==
Fosca, written in 1869, was the basis for Ettore Scola's 1981 film Passione d'amore, which in turn served as the basis for James Lapine and Stephen Sondheim's 1994 musical Passion.

== Bibliography ==
- Caesar, Ann (1987). "Construction of Character in Tarchetti's "Fosca"". Modern Language Review. 82 (1): 76–87. doi:10.2307/3729914. JSTOR 3729914.
- Del Principe, David (1996). Rebellion, Death, and Aesthetics in Italy: The Demons of Scapigliatura. Madison, NJ: Fairleigh Dickinson University Press. ISBN 978-0-8386-3638-1.
- Pireddu, Nicoletta (2004). "Poe spoetizzato: l'esotismo tarchettiano". In R. Cagliero (ed.). Fantastico Poe. Verona: Ombre Corte. pp. 157–176.
- Del Principe, David (2006). "From Beyond the Grave: Ugo Tarchetti's "Fosca" and A. Beresford's "Fosca"". Italica. 83 (3/4): 418–432. JSTOR 27669099.
- Sartini Blum, Cinzia (2015). "Tarchetti's "fame": Revisiting the Myth of the Scapigliato as Misfit Genius". Italica. 92 (2): 337–357. JSTOR 43895971.
- Petraglia, Christina (2017). "A double dose of death in Iginio Ugo Tarchetti's 'I fatali'". In Carol Margaret Davison (ed.). The Gothic and death. Manchester: Manchester University Press. pp. 145–156. ISBN 9781784992699.
- Scalessa, Gabriele (2019). "TARCHETTI, Igino". Dizionario Biografico degli Italiani (in Italian). Vol. 95: Taranto–Togni. Rome: Institute of the Italian Encyclopaedia. ISBN 978-88-12-00032-6.
- Venuti, Lawrence (December 4, 2020). "The Hyena's Laugh: I. U. Tarchetti and the Birth of Italian Gothic". Los Angeles Review of Books.
