= Passion (musical) =

Musical by Stephen Sondheim and James Lapine

- Original Broadway windowcard
- Music: Stephen Sondheim
- Lyrics: Stephen Sondheim
- Book: James Lapine
- Basis: Passione d'Amore by Ruggero Maccari; Ettore Scola; Fosca by Iginio Ugo Tarchetti
- Productions: 1994 Broadway; 1996 West End
- Awards: Tony Award for Best Musical; Tony Award for Best Book of a Musical; Tony Award for Best Original Score

Passion is a one-act musical, with music and lyrics by Stephen Sondheim and a book by James Lapine. The story is adapted from Ettore Scola's 1981 film Passione d'Amore, and its source material, Iginio Ugo Tarchetti's 1869 novel Fosca. Central themes include love, sex, obsession, illness, passion, and the nature of beauty and power. Passion is notable as one of the few projects that Sondheim himself conceived, along with Sweeney Todd and Road Show.

Set in Risorgimento-era Italy, the plot concerns a young soldier and the changes in him brought about by the obsessive love of Fosca, his Colonel's homely, ailing cousin.

== Background and history ==
The story originally came from a 19th-century novel by Iginio Ugo Tarchetti, an experimental Italian writer prominently associated with the Scapigliatura movement. His book Fosca was a fictionalized recounting of an affair he had had with an epileptic woman when he was a soldier.

Sondheim first came up with the idea of writing a musical adaptation when he saw the film in 1983:

As Fosca started to speak and the camera cut back to her, I had my epiphany. I realized that the story was not about how she is going to fall in love with him, but about how he is going to fall in love with her . . . at the same time thinking, "They're never going to convince me of that, they're never going to pull that off," all the while knowing they would, that Scola wouldn't have taken on such a ripely melodramatic story unless he was convinced that he could make it plausible. By the end of the movie, the unwritten songs in my head were brimming and I was certain of two things. First, I wanted to make it into a musical, the problem being that it couldn't be a musical, not even in my nontraditional style, because the characters were so outsized. Second, I wanted James Lapine to write it; he was a romantic, he had a feel for different centuries and different cultures, and he was enthusiastically attracted to weirdness.

As it turned out, Lapine was already exploring the idea of adapting Muscle, a memoir by Sam Fussell, for the musical stage. Together, they came up with the idea of a pair of double-billing one acts. Lapine wrote a couple of scenes and Sondheim had just started working on the opening number when he began to feel that his musical style was unsuitable for Muscle. The piece was more contemporary and in his opinion required a score reflecting pop sensibilities. He called Lapine and suggested that he find another songwriter, perhaps William Finn, and include it as a companion piece. Meanwhile, they continued to work on Passion and as the piece grew, they found that it was enough for an entire evening of theatre, and Sondheim's involvement with Muscle ended. Lapine later completed the piece separately as a full-length musical, Muscle, with Finn and lyricist Ellen Fitzhugh; it received an invitation-only workshop in New York in 1995 and was premiered by Chicago's Pegasus Players in 2001.

== Productions ==
=== Original Broadway production ===
After 52 previews, Passion opened on Broadway at the Plymouth Theatre on May 9, 1994, and closed on January 7, 1995. Directed by James Lapine, the show starred Jere Shea as Giorgio, Donna Murphy as Fosca, and Marin Mazzie as Clara. Scenic design was by Adrianne Lobel, costume design by Jane Greenwood, lighting design by Beverly Emmons, orchestrations by Jonathan Tunick, and music direction by Paul Gemignani. This production was filmed shortly after closing and televised on the Public Broadcasting Service series American Playhouse on September 8, 1996. (It was released on DVD in 2003 by Image Entertainment.) The musical ran a total of 280 performances, making it the shortest-running musical ever to win the Tony Award for Best Musical.

The role of Fosca was originally offered to Patti LuPone, but she turned it down to star in Sunset Boulevard in the West End. LuPone was then famously fired from Sunset Boulevard in favor of Glenn Close, who took the show to Broadway.

On October 20, 2004, there was a tenth-anniversary concert at the Ambassador Theatre. It starred Marin Mazzie, Michael Cerveris, John McMartin and Donna Murphy.

=== Original London production ===
The show opened in the West End, with significant musical and script revisions, at the Queen's Theatre in 1996. Directed by Jeremy Sams, the cast featured Michael Ball as Giorgio, Helen Hobson as Clara, and Maria Friedman as Fosca. The production ran for 232 performances. A recording was later made of the show performed in concert, with nearly all of the original London cast recreating their roles and preserving the musical changes from the earlier production.

=== 2010 London revival ===
A production was mounted at the Donmar Warehouse in London to coincide with Sondheim's 80th birthday celebrations in 2010. It began previews on September 10, opened on September 21, and then continued a sold-out limited engagement until closing on November 27. It was directed by Jamie Lloyd, who was the Donmar associate director at the time, and the cast included Argentine actress Elena Roger, Scarlett Strallen, and David Thaxton. This production won the Evening Standard Awards, Best Musical Award. Thaxton won the Olivier Award for Best Actor in a Musical. During the matinee performance on October 2, actor David Birrell was injured on stage by a faulty firearm, resulting in hospitalization and the cancellation of several performances.

=== 2011 premiere in Germany ===
Passion received its German-language premiere (translated by Roman Hinze) on January 28, 2011, at the Dresden State Operetta. Directed by Holger Hauer, the lead roles were filled by Marcus Günzel (Giorgio), Maike Switzer (Clara) and Vasiliki Roussi (Fosca). The choir and orchestra of the Dresden State Operetta performed under the musical direction of Peter Christian Feigel. A special feature of this production was its orchestral arrangement for a symphonic orchestra, including a great string ensemble, harpsichord and harp, with no electronic instruments being used and modifications to the musical score being made in cooperation with the composer. Passion ran at the Dresden State Operetta in the 2010–11 and 2011–12 seasons. The work was performed for the CD label “bobbymusic” from August 22 to 25, 2012 using the same performers. It is the first recording in German, and the first recording of the entire work with all of the musical numbers and spoken texts. Since December 2, 2013 the double CD has been on sale at the Dresden State Operetta (www.staatsoperette-dresden.de) as well as online (www.soundofmusic-shop.de or www.bobbymusic.de).

=== 2013 Off-Broadway revival ===
The show was mounted by the East Village-based Classic Stage Company, starring Judy Kuhn as Fosca, Melissa Errico as Clara and Ryan Silverman as Giorgio. Known primarily for their stagings of classical plays, Passion was the first musical that the company had ever produced. The production was helmed by John Doyle and took a minimalist approach to the piece. Unlike other Doyle productions of Sondheim works, there were no instruments onstage. The run was extended through April 2013, and a two-disc cast recording was released on July 2 from PS Classics. Rebecca Luker, who played the role of Clara in the Kennedy Center's 2002 Sondheim Celebration production, replaced the ill Errico on this recording.

=== 2016 Scandinavian premiere in Sweden ===
Passion received its Swedish-language premiere (translated by Ulricha Johnson) on September 17, 2016, at the Kulturhuset Spira. Directed by Victoria Brattström, the lead roles were portrayed by Kalle Malmberg (Giorgio), Mari Lerberg Fossum (Clara) and Annica Edstam (Fosca). The Jönköping Sinfonietta performed under the musical direction of Johan Siberg who also wrote the musical arrangements. The production had a second run at NorrlandsOperan in 2017.

=== Other productions ===
The musical made its regional premiere at New Line Theatre in St. Louis in 1996, and was later part of the Sondheim Celebration at the Kennedy Center, running from July 19 to August 23, 2002, directed by Eric Schaeffer. Judy Kuhn and Michael Cerveris played Fosca and Giorgio, with Rebecca Luker as Clara.

The work was presented by the Minnesota Opera in 2004, staged by Tim Albery and starring Patricia Racette as Fosca, William Burden as Giorgio, and Evelyn Pollock as Clara.

In 2004 the show was performed in the Netherlands, and a Dutch-language recording was released—one of the few translations of a Sondheim score. This production had Vera Mann as Fosca, Stanley Burleson as Giorgio, and Pia Douwes as Clara.

A semi-staged concert, starring Patti LuPone as Fosca, Michael Cerveris as Giorgio and Audra McDonald as Clara, was held at Lincoln Center in New York for three performances, March 30 – April 1, 2005. Directed by Lonny Price, this production was broadcast on the PBS television show Live from Lincoln Center on March 31, 2005. It won the Primetime Emmy Award for Outstanding Special Class Program. The score in this production preserved the musical revisions from the London version. This same cast performed the revised London version at the Ravinia Festival, Highland Park, Illinois, on August 22–23, 2003.

The show was done at Chicago Shakespeare Theater from October 2, 2007, to November 11, 2007, starring Ana Gasteyer as Fosca, Adam Brazier as Giorgio, and Kathy Voytko as Clara.

The work was presented by Life Like Company at the Arts Centre Melbourne from November 5 to 8, 2014, starring Theresa Borg as Fosca, Kane Alexander as Giorgio, and Silvie Paladino as Clara.

The musical had its Italian premiere at the Cantiere Internazionale d'Arte of Montepulciano on July 12, 2019, directed by Keith Warner. The musical direction was by Roland Boer, and Janie Dee played Fosca.

A production was staged in 2018 at Signature Theatre directed by Matthew Gardiner and starring Claybourne Elder as Giorgio, Natascia Diaz as Fosca and Steffanie Leigh as Clara. It was Signature's second production of the work.

The show was set to open in Pasadena, California, on March 15, 2020, directed by Michael Michetti at Boston Court Pasadena, but was postponed, and later canceled, due to the COVID-19 pandemic.

In a production produced by Ruthie Henshall who also starred as Fosca, Passion opened at the Hope Mill Theatre in Manchester on May 5, 2022, directed by Michael Strassen.

== Casts ==
| Character | Broadway | West End | Off-Broadway |
| Character | 1994 | 1996 | 2013 |
|---|---|---|---|
| Clara | Marin Mazzie | Helen Hobson | Melissa Errico |
| Giorgio Bachetti | Jere Shea | Michael Ball | Ryan Silverman |
| Fosca | Donna Murphy | Maria Friedman | Judy Kuhn |
| Colonel Ricci | Gregg Edelman | David Firth | Stephen Bogardus |
| Ludovic | Matthew Porretta | Barry Patterson | Will Reynolds |
| Doctor Tambourri | Tom Aldredge | Hugh Ross | Tom Nelis |
| Major Rizzolli | Cris Groenendaal | Nigel Williams | Will Reynolds |

== Synopsis ==
The musical is usually presented in one act. An intermission was added only for the London production.

=== Act I ===
In Milan in 1863, two lovers are at the height of ecstasy ("Happiness"). The handsome captain, Giorgio, breaks their reverie by telling Clara that he is being transferred to a provincial military outpost. In the next scene, Giorgio is in the mess hall at the army camp with Colonel Ricci, the unit's commanding officer, and Dr. Tambourri, its physician. He thinks longingly of Clara ("First Letter") and she thinks longingly of him ("Second Letter"). Giorgio's thoughts are interrupted by a bloodcurdling scream. The Colonel tells him not to worry; it's just Fosca, his sick cousin. Giorgio offers to lend her some of his books.

As he begins to adjust to the tedium of life at the outpost, the sensitive Giorgio feels increasingly out of place amongst the other men ("Third Letter"). He starts becoming friendly with the Doctor, who says Fosca has a nervous disorder. She frequently collapses into seizures, exposing her suffering and need for connection.

Fosca arrives after dinner to thank Giorgio for the books. When he suggests she keep a novel longer to meditate over it, she explains that she does not read to think or search for truth, but to live vicariously through the characters. She then darkly muses on her life ("I Read"). Giorgio awkwardly changes the subject, but when he observes a hearse pulling up, Fosca has a hysterical convulsion. Giorgio is stunned and appalled ("Transition").

The next afternoon, the Colonel, the Doctor, Giorgio, and Fosca go for a walk together. As they stroll through a castle's neglected garden, Giorgio politely engages Fosca in conversation while mentally narrating a letter to Clara. When Fosca confesses that she feels no hope in her life, he tells her that "the only happiness that we can be certain of is love." Fosca is hurt and embarrassed, but recognizes that Giorgio, like herself, is different from others, and asks for his friendship ("Garden Sequence").

Giorgio and Clara exchange letters about Fosca. Clara urges him to avoid her whenever possible. When Giorgio is preparing to take a five-day leave, Fosca shows up unexpectedly, begging him to return soon. Fosca is next seen reading, stone-faced, from a letter Giorgio has sent rejecting her feelings as he and Clara make love ("Trio").

Upon Giorgio's return, Fosca reproaches him. She demands to know about his affair and learns that Clara is married. In a sharp exchange, they agree to sever all ties. Weeks go by with no contact between them, but just as he is beginning to think he is finally free of Fosca, Giorgio is informed by the Doctor that she is dying. His rejection of her love has exacerbated her illness. Giorgio, whose job as a soldier is to save lives, must visit her sickbed. He reluctantly agrees.

Giorgio enters Fosca's chamber, and she implores him to lie beside her while she sleeps. At daybreak, Fosca asks him to write her a letter acknowledging the impact that she has made on his soul ("I Wish I Could Forget You"). She then tries to kiss him. She is seized by another convulsive attack, and he hastens from the room.

=== Act II ===
The soldiers gossip about Giorgio and Fosca while playing pool ("Soldiers' Gossip"). The Colonel thanks Giorgio for the kindness he has shown Fosca and explains her history. As a child, Fosca's parents doted on her, and she once had illusions about her looks. When she was 17, the Colonel introduced her to an Austrian count, Ludovic. Fosca was taken with him, though she had her reservations. Once they were married, Ludovic took all her family's money. Fosca eventually discovered that he had another wife and a child. When confronted, he admitted his deception and vanished. It was then that Fosca first became ill. After her parents died, she went to live with the Colonel, who felt responsible for her circumstances ("Flashback").

Meanwhile, Clara has written Giorgio a letter ("Sunrise Letter") in which she describes her fear of losing love when she is old and no longer beautiful. Giorgio makes his way to a desolate mountain and is in the midst of reading when Fosca appears. After Giorgio lashes out at her in anger ("Is This What You Call Love?"), she crumples and faints. He picks her up and carries her back in the rain.

The rain, the ordeal of getting Fosca back to camp, and perhaps exposure to her contagious emotions conspire to give Giorgio a fever. He falls into slumber and dreams that Fosca is dragging him down into the grave ("Nightmare"). The Doctor sends him to Milan on sick leave ("Forty Days"). As he boards the train, he is followed once again by Fosca. She apologizes for everything and promises to keep her distance for good. Giorgio pleads with her to give him up. She explains that her love is not a choice: it is who she is, and she would gladly die for him ("Loving You"). Giorgio is finally moved by the force of her emotion. He takes her back to the outpost ("Transition").

The Doctor warns Giorgio that he must stop seeing Fosca because she threatens his mental and physical health. Giorgio requests to forgo his leave; he feels it his duty to stay and help her as much as he can. In Milan, Clara questions him jealously about Fosca. Giorgio asks Clara to leave her husband and start a new life with him, but she says she cannot because of her son.

At Christmas, Giorgio is told that he has been transferred to military headquarters. Later, he reads Clara's newest letter, in which she asks him to wait until her son is grown before planning a more serious commitment ("Farewell Letter"). Giorgio finds he no longer desires the carefully arranged, convenient affair they shared ("Just Another Love Story").

Having discovered the letter Fosca dictated, the Colonel accuses Giorgio of leading her on and demands a duel. Giorgio insists the letter is sincere. The Doctor attempts to mediate between them, but Giorgio insists on seeing her again. He realizes that he loves Fosca, for no one has ever truly loved him but her. That evening, he returns to Fosca's room, knowing that the physical act might very well kill her ("No One Has Ever Loved Me"). They embrace, their passion consummated at last.

The duel takes place the following morning behind the castle. Giorgio shoots the Colonel and lets out a shrill howl eerily reminiscent of Fosca's earlier outbursts.

Months later, Giorgio is in a hospital, dazed, recovering from a nervous breakdown. He is told that Fosca died shortly after their night together; the Colonel recovered from the wound. Dreamlike, the other characters in the story reappear as Giorgio begins reading Fosca's last letter. Gradually her voice joins his, and together they look back on their revelations ("Finale").

The company walks off, Fosca last, leaving Giorgio alone at his table.

== Scenes and musical numbers ==
Note: No song titles appear in the program; titles below are from cast recordings.

Scene 1: Clara's bedroom in Milan

- Happiness – Clara and Giorgio

Scene 2: The dining quarters; Outdoors; The dining quarters

- First Letter ("Clara, I cried...") – Clara and Giorgio
- Second Letter ("Giorgio, I too have cried") – Clara and Giorgio
- Third Letter ("Clara, I'm in hell") – Clara, Giorgio and Soldiers
- Fourth Letter ("Yesterday I walked through the park...") – Clara
- I Read – Fosca
- Transition #1 ("How can I describe her?"/"The town – it is remote, isn't it?") – Giorgio/Soldiers

Scene 3: The castle garden

- Garden Sequence
  - "All the while as we strolled..." – Giorgio, Clara
  - "Love that fills every waking moment..." – Clara, Giorgio
  - "To speak to me of love..." – Fosca

Scene 4: The dining quarters

- Three Days – Fosca
- Transition #2 ("All the time I watched from my room...") – Soldiers

Scene 5: The courtyard; Fosca's drawing room & Clara's bedroom

- Happiness – Trio (Fifth Letter) – Fosca, Giorgio, Clara
- Transition #3 ("I watched you from my window...") – Attendants

Scene 6: Fosca's Drawing Room; Doctor Tambourri's office

- Three weeks/"This is hell..." – Clara/Soldiers

Scene 7: Fosca's bedroom

- "God, you are so beautiful..." (Happiness) – Fosca
- I Wish I Could Forget You – Fosca (Giorgio)
- Transition #4 ("How can I describe her? The wretchedness, the embarrassment.") – Soldiers

Scene 8: Billiard room; Outdoors; Flashback to Fosca's past

- Soldiers' Gossip #1 – Soldiers

Scene 9: Flashback to Fosca's past

- Flashback – Colonel Ricci, Fosca, Fosca's Mother, Fosca's Father, Ludovic, Mistress

Scene 10: The Mountainside, a distance from the outpost.

- Sunrise Letter – Clara and Giorgio
- Is This What You Call Love? – Giorgio

Scene 11: Parade ground; Giorgio's bedroom

- Soldiers' Gossip #2 – Soldiers
- Transition #5 – Nightmare ("Everywhere I turn...") – Group #1 and #2

Scene 12: A Train compartment to Milan; back at the Courtyard

- Transition #6 ("To feel a woman's touch...") – Major Rizolli
- Forty Days – Clara
- Loving You – Fosca
- Transition #7 ("How long were we apart") – Woman, Man
- Soldiers' Gossip #3 – Soldiers

Scene 13: Near the Milan Train Station

- "Giorgio, I didn't tell you in my letter" – Clara

Scene 14: A Christmas party at the dining quarters.

- La Pace Sulla Terra (Peace on Earth) – Lieutenant Torasso
- Farewell Letter – Clara
- Just Another Love Story (Happiness/Is This What You Call Love?) – Giorgio and Clara

Scene 15: Doctor Tambourri's office; Fosca's Bedroom

- No One Has Ever Loved Me (Extended) – Giorgio (to Dr. Tambourri) †
- No One Has Ever Loved Me – Giorgio (to Fosca)
- "All this happiness..." (Happiness – Reprise) – Fosca

Scene 16: An Open Field

- The Duel

Scene 17: A hospital

- Final Transition – Company
- Finale (Your Love Will Live In Me) – Giorgio, Fosca, Company

† Cut from the original Broadway production and then restored to 1996 London production.

== Response and analysis ==
Passion was generally admired by critics for its ambition but savaged by theatregoers when it first opened. In particular, audiences were repelled by the characterization of Fosca. During previews, people would applaud whenever Fosca had a meltdown. In one performance, someone from the balcony yelled "Die, Fosca! Die!"

Sondheim said the show is about how "the force of somebody's feelings for you can crack you open, and how it is the life force in a deadened world." In response to the hostility encountered during the early performances, he has said:

The story struck some audiences as ridiculous. They refused to believe that anyone, much less the handsome Giorgio, could come to love someone so manipulative and relentless, not to mention physically repellent, as Fosca. As the perennial banality would have it, they couldn't "identify" with the main characters. The violence of their reaction, however, strikes me as an example of "The lady doth protest too much." I think they may have identified with Giorgio and Fosca all too readily and uncomfortably. The idea of a love that's pure, that burns with D.H. Lawrence's gemlike flame, emanating from a source so gnarled and selfish, is hard to accept. Perhaps they were reacting to the realization that we are all Fosca, we are all Giorgio, we are all Clara.

Michiko Kakutani of the New York Times wrote that Passion had "a lush, romantic score that mirrors the heightened, operatic nature of the story . . . Jonathan Tunick's orchestration plays an especially important role in lending the music a richness of texture and bringing out its sweeping melodic lines. The sets and lighting are warm and glowy and fervent, reminiscent of the colors of Italian frescoes and evocative of the story's intense, highly dramatic mood. Less a series of individual songs than a hypnotic net of music, the show's score traces the shifting, kaleidoscopic emotions of the characters, even as it draws the audience into the dreamlike world of their fevered passions."

Clive Barnes gave the musical a rave review: "Once in an extraordinary while, you sit in a theater and your body shivers with the sense and thrill of something so new, so unexpected, that it seems, for those fugitive moments, more like life than art. Passion is just plain wonderful—emotional and yes, passionate . . . Sondheim's music—his most expressive yet—glows and glowers, and Tunick has found the precise tonal colorations for its impressionistic moods and emotional overlays. From the start of his career, Sondheim has pushed the parameters of his art. Here is the breakthrough. Exultantly dramatic, this is the most thrilling piece of theater on Broadway."

The New York Times review of the original Broadway production called it an "unalloyed love story . . . The score contains some insinuating melodies. You can hear madness in the ecstatic lilt." But, the reviewer wrote, "the boldness of the enterprise never quite pays off. The musical leads an audience right up to the moment of transcendence but is unable in the end to provide the lift that would elevate the material above the disturbing."

In his review of the Off-Broadway revival, Ben Brantley called Passion "the most personal and internalized of Sondheim's works . . . Of all the directors who have staged Mr. Sondheim's musicals, no one cuts closer to their heart than John Doyle, a minimalist with a scalpel. When it was first staged, in 1994, this concentrated portrait of a romantic triangle seemed to take place at a chilly, analytic remove. In contrast Mr. Doyle's Passion comes across as a pulsing collective fever dream. And it reminds us that out of such dreams a startling clarity can emerge, almost painful in its acuteness . . . What follows is the gradual shift of Giorgio's affections from the seductive, radiant Clara to the demanding Fosca, who pursues him with an obsessiveness to rival the revenge fixation of Sweeney Todd. If this is, on the surface, a most improbable transition, it also feels inevitable here, as Giorgio arrives at the realization that 'love within reason is not love at all' . . . but I didn't stop to think that I was listening to songs. I was hearing thought. And at moments, I was hearing a distillation of pure emotion."

== Recordings ==
- Passion – Original Broadway Cast Recording (1994)

== Awards and honors ==
=== Original Broadway production ===
| Year | Award Ceremony | Category | Nominee | Result |
|---|---|---|---|---|
| 1994 | Tony Award | Best Musical | | Won |
| 1994 | Tony Award | Best Book of a Musical | James Lapine | Won |
| 1994 | Tony Award | Best Original Score | Stephen Sondheim | Won |
| 1994 | Tony Award | Best Actor in a Musical | Jere Shea | Nominated |
| 1994 | Tony Award | Best Actress in a Musical | Donna Murphy | Won |
| 1994 | Tony Award | Best Featured Actor in a Musical | Tom Aldredge | Nominated |
| 1994 | Tony Award | Best Featured Actress in a Musical | Marin Mazzie | Nominated |
| 1994 | Tony Award | Best Direction of a Musical | James Lapine | Nominated |
| 1994 | Tony Award | Best Costume Design | Jane Greenwood | Nominated |
| 1994 | Tony Award | Best Lighting Design | Beverly Emmons | Nominated |
| 1994 | Drama Desk Award | Outstanding Musical | | Won |
| 1994 | Drama Desk Award | Outstanding Book of a Musical | James Lapine | Won |
| 1994 | Drama Desk Award | Outstanding Actor in a Musical | Jere Shea | Nominated |
| 1994 | Drama Desk Award | Outstanding Actress in a Musical | Donna Murphy | Won |
| 1994 | Drama Desk Award | Outstanding Director of a Musical | James Lapine | Nominated |
| 1994 | Drama Desk Award | Outstanding Orchestrations | Jonathan Tunick | Won |
| 1994 | Drama Desk Award | Outstanding Lyrics | Stephen Sondheim | Won |
| 1994 | Drama Desk Award | Outstanding Music | Stephen Sondheim | Won |
| 1994 | Drama Desk Award | Outstanding Set Design | Adrianne Lobel | Nominated |
| 1994 | Drama Desk Award | Outstanding Costume Design | Jane Greenwood | Nominated |
| 1994 | Drama Desk Award | Outstanding Lighting Design | Beverly Emmons | Nominated |
| 1994 | Theatre World Award | | Jere Shea | Won |

=== Original London production ===
| Year | Award Ceremony | Category | Nominee | Result |
|---|---|---|---|---|
| 1997 | Laurence Olivier Award | Best New Musical | | Nominated |
| 1997 | Laurence Olivier Award | Best Actress in a Musical | Maria Friedman | Won |
| 1997 | Laurence Olivier Award | Best Performance in a Supporting Role in a Musical | Hugh Ross | Nominated |
| 1997 | Laurence Olivier Award | Best Set Design | Paul Farnsworth | Nominated |

=== 2010 London revival ===
| Year | Award Ceremony | Category | Nominee | Result |
|---|---|---|---|---|
| 2011 | Laurence Olivier Award | Best Musical Revival | | Nominated |
| 2011 | Laurence Olivier Award | Best Actor in a Musical | David Thaxton | Won |
| 2011 | Laurence Olivier Award | Best Actress in a Musical | Elena Roger | Nominated |
| 2011 | Evening Standard Awards | Best Musical Revival | | Won |

=== 2013 Off-Broadway Revival ===
| Year | Award Ceremony | Category | Nominee | Result |
|---|---|---|---|---|
| 2013 | Drama Desk Awards | Drama Desk Award for Outstanding Revival of a Musical | | Nominated |
| 2013 | Drama Desk Awards | Outstanding Actor in a Musical | Ryan Silverman | Nominated |
| 2013 | Drama Desk Awards | Outstanding Featured Actress in a Musical | Melissa Errico | Nominated |
| 2013 | Drama Desk Awards | Outstanding Featured Actor in a Musical | Stephen Bogardus | Nominated |
| 2013 | Drama Desk Awards | Outstanding Director | John Doyle | Nominated |
| 2013 | Drama Desk Awards | Outstanding Sound Design in a Musical | Dan Moses Schreier | Nominated |
| 2013 | Drama Desk Awards | Outstanding Lighting Design | Jane Cox | Nominated |
