= IC Publications =

UK business

- Founded: 1957
- Founder: Afif Ben Yedder
- Country of origin: United Kingdom
- Headquarters location: London
- Publication types: Magazines
- Official website: www.icpublications.com

IC Publications is a publishing house founded in 1957 in Paris by Afif Ben Yedder. Its headquarters are now based in London Farringdon.

The Group's magazines are read by 2.6 million people in over 100 countries.

In English, IC publishes New African, African Business and African Banker. Its flagship title, African Business Magazine, is a widely respected source of business and investment news across the continent.
