= Passion of Love =

1981 film

- French film poster
- Directed by: Ettore Scola
- Screenplay by: Ruggero Maccari; Ettore Scola
- Based on: Fosca by Iginio Ugo Tarchetti
- Produced by: Franco Committeri
- Starring: Bernard Giraudeau
- Cinematography: Claudio Ragona
- Edited by: Raimondo Crociani
- Music by: Armando Trovajoli
- Distributed by: Cineriz
- Release dates: 7 May 1981 (Rome); 16 September 1981 (France)
- Running time: 117 minutes
- Countries: Italy; France
- Language: Italian

Passion of Love (Italian: Passione d'amore) is a 1981 drama film directed by Ettore Scola and was adapted from the 1869 novel Fosca by Iginio Ugo Tarchetti. The film was entered into the 1981 Cannes Film Festival.

It served as the inspiration for the 1994 Broadway musical Passion by Stephen Sondheim and James Lapine.

== Plot ==
In Turin in the winter of 1862, the unmarried Giorgio Bacchetti, a good-looking cavalry captain with a distinguished combat record, is involved in a passionate affair with Clara, a sweet and beautiful married woman. Their meetings end when he is transferred to an isolated outpost on the frontier.

The officers there eat and socialise in the house of their colonel, who has given a home to a handicapped cousin of his. This is a young woman named Fosca, suffering not only from a range of physical and psychological problems but also strikingly ugly. Yet she is also sensitive and cultured, and desperate for sympathetic male company. Encouraged by the regimental surgeon, who thinks contact with the new arrival may help, Giorgio spends time with her.

While she thrives on what to her is a conquest, Giorgio is dragged down by the emotional strain of her demands on him and falls ill. The surgeon realises that his plan was a mistake and that the only solution is to get Giorgio a transfer. The transfer notice is delivered during the Christmas party in the colonel's house. Fosca goes into massive hysterics, to the horror of the guests who had no idea of the existence and depth of her passion.

The colonel, considering his honour impugned by this relationship, which Giorgio entered into out of kindness and pity, challenges Giorgio to a duel next morning. That night, knowing it may be his last and desperately sorry for Fosca, he goes to her bedroom and they consummate their strange love. In the duel, he wounds the colonel but himself collapses under the nervous strain. Fosca dies of shock, and Giorgio is invalided out of the army with no prospects.

== Cast ==
- Bernard Giraudeau as Giorgio
- Valeria D'Obici as Fosca
- Laura Antonelli as Clara
- Jean-Louis Trintignant as Doctor
- Massimo Girotti as Colonel
- Bernard Blier as Maj. Tarasso
- Gerardo Amato as Lt. Baggi
- Sandro Ghiani as Giorgio's attendant
- Alberto Incrocci as Capt. Rivolti
- Rosaria Schemmari as Fosca's maid
- Francesco Piastra as Colonel's attendant
- Saverio Vallone as Blond lieutenant
- Franco Committeri as Clara's husband

== Release ==
Passione d'amore was released in Italy in Rome on May 7, 1981. It was released in France as Passion d'amour on September 16, 1981. It was entered into the 1981 Cannes Film Festival.
