= Muscle: Confessions of an Unlikely Bodybuilder =

1991 book by Samuel Wilson Fussell

- Author: Samuel Wilson Fussell
- Language: English
- Subject: Bodybuilding
- Publisher: Poseidon Press
- Publication date: 1991
- Publication place: United States
- ISBN: 9780671701956

Muscle: Confessions of an Unlikely Bodybuilder is a 1991 non-fiction book by Samuel Wilson Fussell. It describes Fussell's time as a bodybuilder over four years, during which he takes steroids.

Publishers Weekly described it as "A book of minor significance, but enjoyable reading."

Camille Paglia wrote, "Fussell has a great eye for eccentric characters and a great ear for the crackling vernacular. But too little time has passed for him to have psychological perspective on his profoundly self-altering experience.

== Musical adaptation ==
The book was considered for musical adaptation by Broadway composer Stephen Sondheim and librettist James Lapine as a one-act companion piece to Sondheim's Passion, but Sondheim's involvement ended as Passion grew into a full-length show; he suggested Lapine continue the project with another composer. Lapine subsequently completed the piece as a full-length musical with composer William Finn and lyricist Ellen Fitzhugh; it was workshopped in New York in 1995 and received its world premiere at Chicago's Pegasus Players in 2001.
