= Fosca (novel) =

1869 novel by Igino Ugo Tarchetti

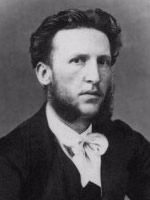
Portrait of Ugo iginio Tarchetti

Fosca is an 1869 Italian-language novel by Iginio Ugo Tarchetti, initially published in serial form. Fosca served as the basis for Ettore Scola's 1981 film Passione d'amore as well as Stephen Sondheim and James Lapine's 1994 stage musical Passion. Due to the success of the stage adaptation, an English translation by Lawrence Venuti was published in 1994 as Passion: A Novel (Mercury House).
