= The Owl and the Pussycat (soundtrack) =

Soundtrack album by Barbra Streisand, George Segal, and Blood, Sweat & Tears
- Released: December 19, 1970
- Genres: Jazz fusion, Jazz rock, Progressive rock, Blue-eyed soul
- Length: 46:41
- Label: Columbia
- Producer: Thomas Z. Shepard

Barbra Streisand chronology
On a Clear Day You Can See Forever (1970)	The Owl and the Pussycat (1970)	Stoney End (1971)

George Segal chronology
The Yama Yama Man (1967)	The Owl and the Pussycat (1970)	A Touch of Ragtime (1974)

Blood, Sweat & Tears chronology
Blood, Sweat & Tears 3 (1970)	The Owl and the Pussycat (1970)	Blood, Sweat & Tears 4 (1971)

The Owl and the Pussycat is the soundtrack album to the 1970 American film of the same name. Released by Columbia Records, it features film dialogue by Barbra Streisand and George Segal recorded over music performed by American band Blood, Sweat & Tears. The album's five tracks were all written by Buck Henry, produced by Thomas Z. Shepard.

While critiqued for lacking any Streisand singing, critics generally felt the music paired nicely with the dialogue. Commercially, the album charted in both the United States and Canada.

== Background ==
The Owl and the Pussycat was released to movie theaters on November 3, 1970, by Columbia Pictures. The accompanying soundtrack was released on vinyl and 8-track cartridge on December 19 of the same year through Columbia Records, featuring five tracks of dialogue spoken by cast members Barbra Streisand and George Segal recorded over music performed by American band Blood, Sweat & Tears. They created the instrumentals for the film while touring shortly before band member and lead vocalist, David Clayton-Thomas, departed the group. This was Clayton-Thomas's first film score credit, and he considered the work as being difficult because he was tasked with placing music over preexisting dialogue. He wrote: "Somebody should have told me what can happen when you do a film score. When the picture is completed, the powers that be can do what they want with the score." The record's five song titles correlate with different scenes in the film and are primarily rock-influenced.

The soundtrack's creation was headed by Richard Halligan, who composed and arranged the selections. Screenwriter Buck Henry is credited with writing all five album tracks while Thomas Z. Shepard served as the album's sole producer. Rather than five individual songs, the 8-track cartridge of the soundtrack features "Highlights from Buck Henry's Hilarious Screenplay" in four consecutive parts.

== Critical reception ==
Professional ratings
Review scores
Source	Rating
AllMusic	1.5/5 stars

Criticism towards the soundtrack was aimed at the absence of Streisand's vocals. AllMusic's William Ruhlmann awarded The Owl and the Pussycat 1.5 out of 5 stars. He suggested that the soundtrack was Streisand's least successful because the album's songs featured the singer talking and enduring in "endless bickering" instead of actually singing and performing with live vocals. The staff members at Billboard noted the influence of rock and big band-style music and wrote that "the music that is heard [...] fits in with the dialogue quite well". Concluding, they wrote: "the dialog itself runs the gamut from absurdly sublime material to simply ridiculous material".

== Commercial performance ==
In the United States, the album debuted at the bottom position on the Billboard 200 chart on February 6, 1971. It later peaked at number 186, becoming Streisand's lowest-charting entry of her entire career, behind 1967's A Christmas Album and 1970's On a Clear Day You Can See Forever, which both peaked at number 108. However, the soundtrack fared better for Segal, as his previous highest-peaking record was The Yama Yama Man, which peaked at number 199 in September 1967. On Canada's Top Albums chart conducted and published by RPM, The Owl and the Pussycat debuted at number 85 during the week ending January 16, 1971. It eventually peaked at number 74.

== Track listing ==
All tracks written by Buck Henry and produced by Thomas Z. Shepard.

The Owl and the Pussycat (Comedy Highlights and Music from the Soundtrack) – Standard edition
No.	Title	Length
1.	"The Confrontation"	11:18
2.	"The Warmup"	9:55
3.	"The Seduction"	4:01
4.	"The Morning After"	11:05
5.	"The Reunion"	10:22
Total length:		46:41

An alternate edition of the soundtrack was released on 8-track cartridge and cassette tape, divided into four tracks instead of five.

The Owl and the Pussycat (Comedy Highlights and Music from the Soundtrack) – 8-track cartridge edition
No.	Title	Length
1.	"Highlights from Buck Henry's Hilarious Screenplay" (Part 1)	11:36
2.	"Highlights from Buck Henry's Hilarious Screenplay" (Part 2)	11:36
3.	"Highlights from Buck Henry's Hilarious Screenplay" (Part 3)	11:36
4.	"Highlights from Buck Henry's Hilarious Screenplay" (Part 4)	11:36
Total length:		46:24

== Personnel ==
- Barbra Streisand – dialogue
- George Segal – dialogue
- Blood, Sweat & Tears – music
- Richard Halligan – composer, arranger
- Buck Henry – writer
- Al Hirschfield – illustrations
- Arthur Kendy – engineering
- Steve Schiffman – liner notes
- Thomas Z. Shepard – producer

== Charts ==
Weekly chart performance for The Owl and the Pussycat (soundtrack)
Chart (1971)	Peak position
Canada Top Albums/CDs (RPM)	74
US Billboard 200	186

== Release history ==
Region	Date	Format(s)	Label	Ref.
United States	December 19, 1970	LP	Columbia	
United States	December 19, 1970	8-track cartridge	Columbia	

=== Instrumentals ===
Blood, Sweat & Tears released all the film's instrumental and incidental compositions on Rare, Rarer & Rarest, a 2013 compilation album that also includes outtakes from The Owl and the Pussycat score.
