= Ain't Misbehavin' =

Ain't Misbehavin' may refer to:

== Music ==
- "Ain't Misbehavin'" (song), a 1929 Fats Waller standard
- Ain't Misbehavin' (musical), a 1978 musical that features the 1929 song
  - Ain't Misbehavin' (original Broadway cast recording), a 1978 album containing a recording of the musical
- Ain't Misbehavin' (Clark Terry album), 1979
- Ain't Misbehavin' (Hank Jones album), 1979
- Ain't Misbehavin' (Tokyo Blade album), 1987
- Ain't Misbehavin' (UFO album), 1986

== Film and television ==
- Ain't Misbehavin' (film), a 1955 American musical romantic comedy
- Ain't Misbehavin' (TV series), a 1990s British sitcom
- Ain't Misbehavin' (serial), a 1997 British TV serial starring Jerome Flynn and Robson Green
