= Flaco Jiménez (album) =

Studio album by Flaco Jiménez
- Released: October 25, 1994
- Genre: Tejano
- Length: 33:51
- Label: Arista
- Producer: Bill Halverson, Flaco Jiménez

Flaco Jiménez chronology
Partners (1992)	Flaco Jiménez (1994)	Bolsa Vacía (1995)

Flaco Jiménez is a studio album released by American performer Flaco Jiménez. It was released on October 25, 1994, by Arista Records. Jiménez was awarded the Best Mexican-American/Tejano Music Performance at the 38th Grammy Awards with the album.

== Track listing ==
No.	Title	Writer(s)	Length
1.	"Seguro Que Hell Yes"	Mike Blakely, Alex Harvey, John Arthur Martínez	3:33
2.	"El Pesudo"	Ramón Ortega	2:56
3.	"Por Las Parrandas"	José Flores, Miguel Vaca Flores	3:20
4.	"Por Una Mujer Bonita"	Eddie Alemán, George Gonzáles	3:19
5.	"Jealous Heart"	Jenny Carson	3:13
6.	"Open up Your Heart"	Buck Owens	3:24
7.	"Que Problems"	Abel Santos Alaniz	3:26
8.	"Carolina"	Flaco Jiménez, Oscar Téllez	2:50
9.	"Que Lo Sepa el Mundo"	Salomé Gutiérrez	2:51
10.	"Catwalk"	Jiménez, Lee Roy Parnell	4:59

== Chart performance ==
Chart (1994)	Peak position
US Billboard Top Latin Albums	38
US Billboard Regional Mexican Albums	14
