= Merrily We Roll Along =

Merrily We Roll Along may refer to:

- Merrily We Roll Along (play), a 1934 play by George S. Kaufman and Moss Hart
- "Merrily We Roll Along" (song), a 1935 composition used as the Warner Bros. theme for Looney Tunes and Merrie Melodies
- Merrily We Roll Along (DuPont Show of the Week), a 1961 television special about automobiles hosted by Groucho Marx
- Merrily We Roll Along (musical), a 1981 musical by Stephen Sondheim and George Furth, adapted from the 1934 play
  - Merrily We Roll Along (original Broadway cast recording), an album of the 1981 musical
  - Merrily We Roll Along (film), an upcoming American coming-of-age musical comedy film based on the 1981 musical
- "Goodnight, Ladies", an old folk song which contains the line "Merrily we roll along"
