= 29th Annual Grammy Awards =

1987 US music awards ceremony

- Date: February 24, 1987
- Location: Shrine Auditorium, Los Angeles, California
- Hosted by: Billy Crystal
- Most awards: Steve Winwood, Anita Baker and Deniece Williams (2)
- Most nominations: Steve Winwood (5)

Television/radio coverage
- Network: CBS

The 29th Annual Grammy Awards were held on February 24, 1987, at Shrine Auditorium, Los Angeles, California. They recognized accomplishments by musicians from the previous year.

Paul Simon won Album of the Year for Graceland, and Burt Bacharach and Carole Bayer Sager won Song of the Year for "That's What Friends Are For".

== Performers ==
- Whitney Houston – "Greatest Love of All"
- Simply Red – "Money's Too Tight (to Mention)"
- Luther Vandross – "Give Me the Reason"
- Steve Earle – "Guitar Town"
- Randy Travis – "Diggin' Up Bones"
- Dwight Yoakam – "Guitars, Cadillacs"
- Willie Dixon – "I Just Want to Make Love to You"
- Albert King & B. B. King – "Let the Good Times Roll"
- Sandi Patty – "Let There Be Praise"
- Billy Idol – "To Be a Lover"
- Anita Baker – "God Bless the Child"
- Bobby McFerrin – "Round Midnight"
- Kathleen Battle – "Ave Maria (Schubert)"
- Janet Jackson – "What Have You Done for Me Lately"
- Ben E. King, Whitney Houston, Mick Hucknall & Luther Vandross – "Stand by Me"

== Presenters ==
- Bob Geldof & The Bangles - Best Pop Vocal Performance Male
- Robert Palmer & Peter Cetera - Best Pop Vocal Performance Female
- The Fabulous Thunderbirds & Kenny Loggins - Best New Artist
- Ben E. King & Gregory Abbott - Best R&B Vocal Performance Male and Female
- Michael McDonald & Brian Wilson - Producer of the Year
- The Judds & The Gatlin Brothers - Best Country Vocal Performance Male
- Carol Bayer Sager - Introduces That's What Friends Are For
- Olivia Newton-John & Julio Iglesias - Song of the Year
- John Denver - Introduces the Grammy Hall of Fame
- Al Green & Ricky Skaggs - Best Gospel Performance
- Kim Carnes & James Ingram - Presented awards earlier
- The Beastie Boys - Best Rock Vocal Performance Male
- Ruben Blades & Miles Davis - Best Male Jazz Vocal Performance
- Larry Blackmon & Kris Kristofferson - Record of the Year
- Don Johnson & Whoopi Goldberg - Album of the Year

== Award winners ==
Record of the Year

- "Higher Love" – Steve Winwood
  - Russ Titelman & Steve Winwood, producers
- "Sledgehammer" – Peter Gabriel
  - Peter Gabriel & Daniel Lanois, producers
- "Greatest Love of All" – Whitney Houston
  - Michael Masser, producer
- "Addicted to Love" – Robert Palmer
  - Bernard Edwards, producer
- "That's What Friends Are For" – Dionne Warwick & Friends; Elton John, Gladys Knight & Stevie Wonder
  - Burt Bacharach & Carole Bayer Sager, producers

Album of the Year

- Graceland – Paul Simon
  - Paul Simon, producer
- So – Peter Gabriel
  - Peter Gabriel & Daniel Lanois, producers
- Control – Janet Jackson
  - Janet Jackson, Jimmy Jam & Terry Lewis, producers
- The Broadway Album – Barbra Streisand
  - Peter Matz, producer
- Back in the High Life – Steve Winwood
  - Russ Titelman & Steve Winwood, producers

Song of the Year

- "That's What Friends Are For"
  - Burt Bacharach & Carole Bayer Sager, songwriters (Dionne Warwick & Friends; Elton John, Gladys Knight & Stevie Wonder)
- "Sledgehammer"
  - Peter Gabriel, songwriter (Peter Gabriel)
- "Addicted to Love"
  - Robert Palmer, songwriter (Robert Palmer)
- "Higher Love"
  - Steve Winwood & Will Jennings, songwriters (Steve Winwood)
- "Graceland"
  - Paul Simon, songwriter (Paul Simon)

Best New Artist

- Bruce Hornsby & the Range
- Glass Tiger
- Nu Shooz
- Simply Red
- Timbuk3

=== Blues ===
- Best Traditional Blues Recording
  - Albert Collins, Johnny Copeland & Robert Cray for Showdown!

=== Children's ===
- Best Recording for Children
  - Jim Henson, Kathryn King & Geri Van Rees (producers) for The Alphabet performed by the Sesame Street cast

=== Classical ===
- Best Classical Orchestral Recording
  - Michael Haas (producer), Georg Solti (conductor) & the Chicago Symphony Orchestra for Liszt: A Faust Symphony
- Best Classical Vocal Soloist Performance
  - André Previn (conductor), Kathleen Battle & the Royal Philharmonic Orchestra for Kathleen Battle Sings Mozart
- Best Opera Recording
  - Elizabeth Ostrow (producer), John Mauceri (conductor), James Billings, Joyce Castle, Maris Clement, David Eisler, Jack Harrold, John Lankston, Erie Mills, Scott Reeve & the New York City Opera Orchestra for Bernstein: Candide
- Best Choral Performance (other than opera)
  - James Levine (conductor), Margaret Hillis (choir director) & the Chicago Symphony Orchestra & Chorus for Orff: Carmina Burana
- Best Classical Performance - Instrumental Soloist or Soloists (with or without orchestra)
  - Vladimir Horowitz for Horowitz - The Studio Recordings, New York 1985
- Best Chamber Music Performance
  - Emanuel Ax & Yo-Yo Ma for Beethoven: Cello Sonata No. 4; Variations
- Best Contemporary Composition
  - Witold Lutosławski (composer) & Esa-Pekka Salonen (conductor) for Lutosławski: Symphony No. 3
- Best Classical Album
  - Thomas Frost (producer) & Vladimir Horowitz for Horowitz - The Studio Recordings, New York 1985

=== Comedy ===
- Best Comedy Recording
  - Bill Cosby for Those of You With or Without Children, You'll Understand

=== Composing and arranging ===
- Best Instrumental Composition
  - John Barry (composer) for Out of Africa
- Best Arrangement on an Instrumental
  - Patrick Williams (arranger) for "Suite Memories" performed by Bill Watrous & Patrick Williams
- Best Instrumental Arrangement Accompanying Vocals
  - David Foster (arranger) for "Somewhere" performed by Barbra Streisand

=== Country ===
- Best Country Vocal Performance, Female
  - Reba McEntire for "Whoever's in New England"
- Best Country Vocal Performance, Male
  - Ronnie Milsap for Lost in the Fifties Tonight
- Best Country Performance by a Duo or Group with Vocal
  - The Judds for "Grandpa (Tell Me 'Bout the Good Ol' Days)"
- Best Country Instrumental Performance (orchestra, group or soloist)
  - Ricky Skaggs for "Raisin' the Dickens"
- Best Country Song
  - Jamie O'Hara (songwriter) for "Grandpa (Tell Me 'Bout the Good Old Days)" performed by The Judds

=== Folk ===
- Best Traditional Folk Recording
  - Doc Watson for Riding the Midnight Train
- Best Contemporary Folk Recording
  - Al Bunetta, Dan Einstein & Hank Neuberger (producers) for Tribute to Steve Goodman performed by various artists

=== Gospel ===
- Best Gospel Performance, Female
  - Sandi Patti for Morning Like This
- Best Gospel Performance, Male
  - Philip Bailey for Triumph
- Best Gospel Performance by a Duo or Group, Choir or Chorus
  - Deniece Williams & Sandi Patti for "They Say"
- Best Soul Gospel Performance, Female
  - Deniece Williams for "I Surrender All"
- Best Soul Gospel Performance, Male
  - Al Green for "Going Away"
- Best Soul Gospel Performance by a Duo or Group, Choir or Chorus
  - The Winans for Let My People Go

=== Historical ===
- Best Historical Album
  - Aziz Goksel & Bob Porter (producers) for Atlantic Rhythm and Blues 1947-1974, Vols. 1-7 performed by various artists

=== Jazz ===
- Best Jazz Vocal Performance, Female
  - Diane Schuur for Timeless
- Best Jazz Vocal Performance, Male
  - Bobby McFerrin for "Round Midnight"
- Best Jazz Vocal Performance, Duo or Group
  - 2+2 Plus for Free Fall
- Best Jazz Instrumental Performance, Soloist
  - Miles Davis for Tutu
- Best Jazz Instrumental Performance, Group
  - Wynton Marsalis for J Mood
- Best Jazz Instrumental Performance, Big Band
  - Doc Severinsen for The Tonight Show Band with Doc Severinsen
- Best Jazz Fusion Performance, Vocal or Instrumental
  - Bob James & David Sanborn for Double Vision

=== Latin ===
- Best Latin Pop Performance
  - José Feliciano for "Le Lo Lai"
- Best Tropical Latin Performance
  - Rubén Blades for Escenas
- Best Mexican-American Performance
  - Flaco Jiménez for Ay Te Dejo en San Antonio y Más!

=== Musical show ===
- Best Cast Show Album
  - Thomas Z. Shepard (producer) & the original 1986 cast for Follies in Concert

=== Music video ===
- Best Music Video, Short Form
  - Dire Straits for "Dire Straits - Brothers in Arms"
- Best Music Video, Long Form
  - Michael Apted (video director) & Sting for Bring on the Night

=== New Age ===
- Best New Age Recording
  - Andreas Vollenweider for Down to the Moon

=== Packaging and notes ===
- Best Album Package
  - Eiko Ishioka (art director) for Tutu performed by Miles Davis
- Best Album Notes
  - Andrew Sarris, Frank Conroy, Gary Giddins, Jonathan Schwartz, Murray Kempton, Stephen Holden & Wilfrid Sheed for The Voice - The Columbia Years 1943-1952 performed by Frank Sinatra

=== Polka ===
- Best Polka Recording
  - Eddie Blazonczyk for Another Polka Celebration performed by Eddie Blazonczyk's Versatones
  - Jimmy Sturr for I Remember Warsaw performed by Jimmy Sturr & His Orchestra

=== Pop ===
- Best Pop Vocal Performance, Female
  - Barbra Streisand for The Broadway Album
- Best Pop Vocal Performance, Male
  - Steve Winwood for "Higher Love"
- Best Pop Performance by a Duo or Group with Vocal
  - Dionne Warwick, Elton John, Gladys Knight & Stevie Wonder for "That's What Friends Are For"
- Best Pop Instrumental Performance, (Orchestra, Group or Soloist)
  - Harold Faltermeyer & Steve Stevens for "Top Gun Anthem"

=== Production and engineering ===
- Best Engineered Recording, Non-Classical
  - Jason Corsaro and Tom Lord-Alge (engineers) for Back in the High Life performed by Steve Winwood
- Best Engineered Recording, Classical
  - Paul Goodman (engineer) & Vladimir Horowitz for Horowitz - The Studio Recordings, New York 1985
- Producer of the Year (Non-Classical)
  - Jimmy Jam and Terry Lewis
- Classical Producer of the Year
  - Thomas Frost

=== R&B ===
- Best R&B Vocal Performance, Female
  - Anita Baker for Rapture
- Best R&B Vocal Performance, Male
  - James Brown for "Living in America"
- Best R&B Performance by a Duo or Group with Vocal
  - Prince and The Revolution for "Kiss"
- Best R&B Instrumental Performance (Orchestra, Group or Soloist)
  - Yellowjackets for "And You Know That"
- Best Rhythm & Blues Song
  - Anita Baker, Gary Bias & Louis A. Johnson (songwriters) for "Sweet Love" performed by Anita Baker

=== Reggae ===
- Best Reggae Recording
  - Peter Tosh for No Nuclear War

=== Rock ===
- Best Rock Vocal Performance, Female
  - Tina Turner for "Back Where You Started"
- Best Rock Vocal Performance, Male
  - Robert Palmer for "Addicted to Love"
- Best Rock Performance by a Duo or Group with Vocal
  - Eurythmics for "Missionary Man"
- Best Rock Instrumental Performance (Orchestra, Group or Soloist)
  - Art of Noise & Duane Eddy for "Peter Gunn"

=== Spoken ===
- Best Spoken Word or Non-musical Recording
  - Johnny Cash, Jerry Lee Lewis, Chips Moman, Ricky Nelson, Roy Orbison, Carl Perkins & Sam Phillips for Interviews From the Class of '55 Recording Sessions
