= Mike Blakely =

American singer-songwriter

Mike Blakely is an American novelist and singer-songwriter, focusing on Western subjects. He lives in, and is closely associated with, the U.S. state of Texas.

== Books ==
Blakely has been writing Western fiction since 1993. Eighteen of his novels are currently in print. Two of them were co-written with Willie Nelson and Kenny Rogers.

Summer of Pearls, won the 2000 Spur Award for Best Western Novel from the Western Writers of America. Two others have been nominated for the award. Four of his novels comprise an untitled Western saga that has been compared to the work of Louis L'Amour.

=== Partial Bibliography ===
- The Snowy Range Gang, 1992
- Glory Trail, 1993
- Shortgrass Song, 1994
- The Last Chance, 1995
- Wild Camp Tales, 1995
- Too Long at the Dance, 1996
- More Wild Camp Tales, 1996
- Spanish Blood, 1996
- Dead Reckoning, 1997
- Vendetta Gold, 1998
- Comanche Dawn, 1998
- Summer of Pearls, 2000
- Moon Medicine, 2001
- Come Sundown, 2006
- A Song to Die For, 2014
- A Sinister Splendor, 2019

== Music ==
As a performer, Mike Blakely has toured extensively on his own and with his band and has made 16 tours to Europe. He currently performs mostly at festivals, house concerts, and private parties, most of them in Texas. He holds monthly concerts at his ranch near Llano.

He has released eleven CDs on his own label, mostly featuring his own songs. His songs have also been recorded by artists such as Johnny Bush, Flaco Jiménez, Raul Malo, Gary P. Nunn, Johnny Rodriguez, and Red Steagall. In 2007, his story song "The Last Wild White Buffalo" won the first-ever Spur Award for Best Western Song. Members of the Western Writers of America named three of his songs as being among the Top 100 Western songs of all time: "The Last Wild White Buffalo", "The Last Comanche Moon", and "The Old Cantina".

== Personal life ==
Mike Blakely grew up on a ranch in Wharton County, Texas, where he helped his father tend cattle. He says he "has always wanted to live in the country, have his own place, be his own boss, and hunt and fish." From an early age, he also wanted to be a fiction writer. He served as a helicopter mechanic in the U.S. Air Force, after which he earned a degree in journalism at the University of Texas at Austin. His literary influences include one of his early English teachers, as well as J. Frank Dobie, Elmer Kelton, and Norman Zollinger. He is a past president of the Western Writers of America.
