= On a Clear Day You Can See Forever (soundtrack) =

Soundtrack album by Barbra Streisand and Yves Montand
- Released: July 1, 1970
- Recorded: Early 1970
- Studio: Samuel Goldwyn Studios (West Hollywood, California)
- Length: 31:12
- Label: Columbia
- Producer: Wally Gold

Barbra Streisand chronology
Barbra Streisand's Greatest Hits (1970)	On a Clear Day You Can See Forever (1970)	The Owl and the Pussycat (1970)

Yves Montand chronology
Je soussigné (1969)	On a Clear Day You Can See Forever (1970)	Yves Montand (1970)

On a Clear Day You Can See Forever is the soundtrack album to the 1970 American film of the same name. It was released by Columbia Records on July 1, 1970 and features singing by Barbra Streisand and Yves Montand, in addition to choral arrangements and live orchestration. No commercial singles were released from the soundtrack, but the reprise version of the title track was released as a promotional single on 7" vinyl by Columbia. Executively and solely produced by Wally Gold, the album's ten tracks were written by Alan Jay Lerner while the music was written by Burton Lane. The album was reissued on compact disc in 2008.

Music critics highlighted the compilation's title track and Streisand's singing ability. Commercially, the soundtrack was once Streisand's lowest-performing entry on the Billboard 200, peaking at number 108 in September 1970. However, her other 1970 soundtrack album, The Owl and the Pussycat, would later take its place as Streisand's lowest-peaking album. Nonetheless, On a Clear Day You Can See Forever served as Montand's only charting effort in the United States.

== Background and songs ==
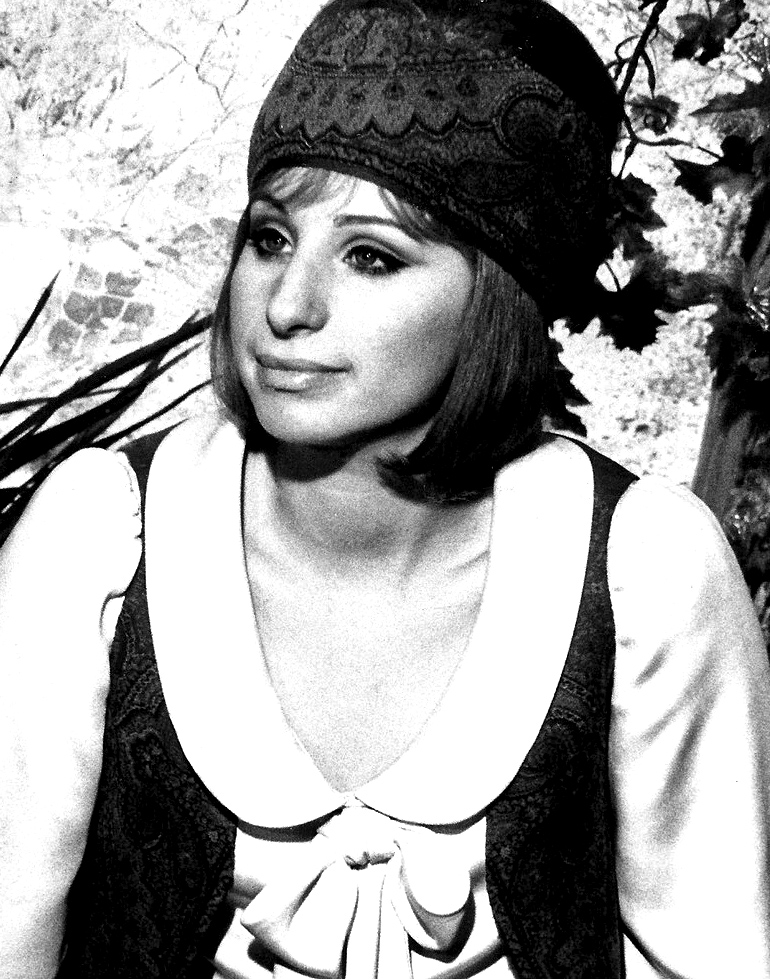
Barbra Streisand portraying Daisy Gamble in the film On a Clear Day You Can See Forever.

On a Clear Day You Can See Forever was released on July 1, 1970, through Barbra Streisand's record label, Columbia Records. The songs were recorded by Streisand and co-star Yves Montand on-set at Samuel Goldwyn Studios in West Hollywood, California in early 1970. Lyrics for the album's ten songs were written by Alan Jay Lerner while the music was written by Burton Lane. On the album's fourth track, "Melinda", Luiz Bonfá and Maria Toledo are credited as additional lyricists. Streisand is credited as the sole singer for "Hurry! It's Lovely Up Here", "Love with All the Trimmings", "Go to Sleep", "He Isn't You", "What Did I Have That I Don't Have", and the reprise version of the title track, while Montand is credited for the standard version of the title track in addition to "Melinda" and "Come Back to Me". The album's second song is an orchestral version of "On a Clear Day (You Can See Forever)" as performed by a live chorus. The album itself was executively produced by Wally Gold and arranged and conducted by Nelson Riddle.

Although no songs were released from the soundtrack as singles, the film's title track "On a Clear Day (You Can See Forever)" was distributed as a promotional single by Columbia Records in July 1970. Distributed to the radio stations for airplay, the 7" release featured the reprise version of the song as both the A-side and B-side. The soundtrack was also printed on 8-track cartridges where it was distributed with the same track listing but a revised order. On a Clear Day You Can See Forever was released physically on compact discs on February 5, 2008.

== Critical reception ==
Professional ratings
Review scores
Source	Rating
AllMusic	2/5 stars
Billboard	Favorable

The soundtrack to On a Clear Day You Can See Forever received generally positive reviews from music critics. The staff at Billboard wrote that the strength of the title track, "He Isn't You", and "What Did I Have That I Don't Have" made the soundtrack worth buying. They also predicted that the soundtrack would be successful on the Billboard charts due to the film's popularity. Vincent Canby from The New York Times considered "Love with All the Trimmings" to be the album's highlight due to its "lush lyricism"; among the rest of the soundtrack, he listed "Come Back to Me", "Go to Sleep", "On a Clear Day (You Can See Forever)", and "What Did I Have That I Don't Have" as the album's "four other excellent songs". AllMusic's William Ruhlmann was more critical of the collection, writing: "The film was considered to be a low point in the career of Barbra Streisand, and the soundtrack is not much better." Although he awarded the album two out of five stars and complimented Streisand's strong vocals, Ruhlmann criticized the decision to include most of Montand's contributions: "[he] gets a lot of space on the record, making this almost a complete waste."

== Commercial performance ==
At the time of its release, On a Clear Day You Can See Forever became Streisand's lowest-charting effort on the Billboard 200 in the United States, whereas for Montand, it served as his highest and only entry. For the week of July 25, 1970, the soundtrack entered at number 192, becoming the week's fifth-highest debut. During its seventh week charting, it peaked at number 108 in the United States, becoming Streisand's first album to miss the top 100 of the chart. In total, it spent a total of 24 weeks on the Billboard 200. Later that year, Streisand's other soundtrack album – The Owl and the Pussycat – would underperform more on the chart, only peaking at number 186 and becoming Streisand's lowest-charting album.

== Track listing ==
On a Clear Day You Can See Forever – Standard edition
No.	Title	Writer(s)	Performer(s)	Length
1.	"Hurry! It's Lovely Up Here"	Burton Lane; Alan Jay Lerner	Barbra Streisand	2:56
2.	"On a Clear Day (You Can See Forever)" (Main Theme)	Lane; Lerner	Orchestra / Chorus	2:28
3.	"Love with All the Trimmings"	Lane; Lerner	Streisand	2:50
4.	"Melinda"	Luiz Bonfá; Lane; Lerner; Maria Toledo	Yves Montand	2:18
5.	"Go to Sleep"	Lane; Lerner	Streisand	3:01
6.	"He Isn't You"	Lane; Lerner	Streisand	2:14
7.	"What Did I Have That I Don't Have"	Lane; Lerner	Streisand	5:58
8.	"Come Back to Me"	Lane; Lerner	Montand	4:25
9.	"On a Clear Day (You Can See Forever)"	Lane; Lerner	Montand	2:51
10.	"On a Clear Day (You Can See Forever)" (Reprise)	Lane; Lerner	Streisand	2:11
Total length:				31:12

On a Clear Day You Can See Forever – 8-track cartridge edition
No.	Title	Length
1.	"Hurry! It's Lovely Up Here"	2:56
2.	"On a Clear Day (You Can See Forever)" (Main Theme)	2:28
3.	"Melinda"	2:18
4.	"Go to Sleep"	3:01
5.	"Come Back to Me"	4:25
6.	"He Isn't You"	2:14
7.	"What Did I Have That I Don't Have"	5:58
8.	"Love with All the Trimmings"	2:50
9.	"On a Clear Day (You Can See Forever)"	2:51
10.	"On a Clear Day (You Can See Forever)" (Reprise)	2:11
Total length:		31:12

== Personnel ==
Credits adapted from the liner notes of the CD edition of On a Clear Day You Can See Forever.

- Yves Montand – vocals
- Barbra Streisand – vocals
- John Arrias – CD restoration
- Luiz Bonfá – lyrics (track 4)
- Wally Gold – production
- Bernie Grundman – CD remastering
- Burton Lane – music
- Alan Jay Lerner – lyrics
- Don Meehan – recording engineer
- Nelson Riddle – music arrangements, conductor
- Maria Toledo – lyrics (track 4)

== Charts ==
Weekly chart for On a Clear Day You Can See Forever (soundtrack)
Chart (1970)	Peak position
US Billboard 200	108
US Cashbox Top Albums	50

== Release history ==
Region	Date	Format	Label
United States	July 1, 1970	LP · 8-track cartridge	Columbia
United States	February 5, 2008	CD	Columbia
