= Follies in Concert =

Cast recording by various artists
- Released: 1985 or January 1986
- Label: RCA Red Seal

Follies in Concert is a concert video and an album recorded live on September 6 and 7, 1985, at Avery Fisher Hall, New York City. It contains a recording of the musical Follies, with music and lyrics by Stephen Sondheim.

== Background ==
The album was produced by Thomas Z. Shepard.

== Critical reception ==
Follies: In Concert (video)
Review scores
Source	Rating
AllMusic	3/5 stars

Follies in Concert (album)
Review scores
Source	Rating
Record Research	(favorable)

In a contemporary review for AllMusic, Marjorie Ellen Ruhlmann notes: "This performance [...] features a dream cast singing Sondheim's ambitious and fascinating score. It includes Barbara Cook, George Hearn, Mandy Patinkin, Lee Remick, Betty Comden, Adolph Green, Liliane Montevecchi, Elaine Stritch, Phyllis Newman and Carol Burnett, among others."

Back in 1986, Record Research, too, noted the cast, starting its review with: "Not an original cast LP, but what a cast for this special concert of Sondheim's show!".

According to The Stephen Sondheim Encyclopedia, "some critics find the overall recording 'less than sum of its parts'".

== Chart performance ==
The album debuted at number 190 on the Billboard 200 chart for the week of January 25, 1986, and peaked at number 181 two weeks later.

== Track listing ==
LP – RCA Red Seal HBC2-7128

All lyrics are written by Stephen Sondheim; all music is composed by Stephen Sondheim.

Side 1
No.	Title	Artist(s)	Length
1.	"Overture"	New York Philharmonic Conductor – Paul Gemignani	5:02
2.	"Beautiful Girls"	Andre Gregory, Arthur Rubin	4:58
3.	"Don't Look at Me"	Barbara Cook, George Hearn	2:04
4.	"Waiting for the Girl Upstairs"	Jim Walton, Howard McGillin, Mandy Patinkin, George Hearn, Lee Remick, Barbara Cook, Liz Callaway, Daisy Prince	5:40
5.	"Rain on the Roof"	Betty Comden, Adolph Green	0:51
6.	"Ah, Paree!"	Liliane Montevecchi	2:01
7.	"Broadway Baby"	Elaine Stritch	4:04

Side 2
No.	Title	Artist(s)	Length
1.	"The Road You Didn't Take"	George Hearn	2:50
2.	"In Buddy's Eyes"	Barbara Cook	2:59
3.	"Who's That Woman?"	Phyllis Newman, Barbara Cook, Lee Remick, Elaine Stritch, Betty Comden, Liliane Montevecchi	5:23
4.	"I'm Still Here"	Carol Burnett	5:49

Side 3
No.	Title	Artist(s)	Length
1.	"Too Many Mornings"	George Hearn, Barbara Cook	4:52
2.	"The Right Girl"	Mandy Patinkin	4:40
3.	"One More Kiss"	Licia Albanese, Erie Mills	2:45
4.	"Could I Leave You?"	Lee Remick	3:03
5.	"Loveland"	"Follies" Original Broadway Cast	2:48
6.	"You're Gonna Love Tomorrow" / "Love Will See Us Through"	Howard McGillin, Jim Walton, Daisy Prince, Liz Callaway	4:49

Side 4
No.	Title	Artist(s)	Length
1.	"Buddy's Blues"	Mandy Patinkin	3:59
2.	"Losing My Mind"	Barbara Cook	4:17
3.	"The Story of Lucy and Jessie"	Lee Remick	2:46
4.	"Live, Laugh, Love"	George Hearn	4:45
5.	"Finale: Waiting For The Girls Upstairs"; "Beautiful Girls" (Reprise)	"Follies" Original Broadway Cast	4:06

== Charts ==
Chart (1986)	Peak position
US Billboard 200	181

== Awards ==
Year	Award type	Categories	Results	Ref.
1987	Grammy Awards	Best Cast Show Album	Won	
