= Call Down the Thunder =

Studio album by Guy Davis
- Released: 1996
- Studio: The Loft
- Genre: Blues
- Label: Red House
- Producer: Joe Ferry, Guy Davis

Guy Davis chronology
Stomp Down Rider (1995)	Call Down the Thunder (1996)	You Don't Know My Mind (1998)

Call Down the Thunder is an album by the American musician Guy Davis, released in 1996. He supported the album with a North American tour.

== Production ==
Recorded at The Loft, in Bronxville, New York, the album was coproduced by Joe Ferry. Davis considered his writing style similar to Bob Dylan's, where he would fill a page with as many words as possible before editing them. "I Got the Power" is about a deal with the devil. Pete Seeger played banjo on "Jelly Bone Jelly". "Minglewood Blues" is a version of the Noah Lewis song. "When You Got a Good Friend" is a cover of the Robert Johnson song. "See Me When You Can" is a tribute to Davis's grandmother.

== Critical reception ==
Professional ratings
Review scores
Source	Rating
AllMusic	3/5 stars
DownBeat	4/5 stars
Los Angeles Daily News	3/4 stars
MusicHound Blues: The Essential Album Guide	4.5/5 stars
The Penguin Guide to Blues Recordings	4/4 stars

The Los Angeles Daily News opined that "the best song here is barely blues at all... Davis's own 'The Road Is Calling' has a great r&b feel that fits so well." Jeanne Cooper, of The Boston Globe, listed Call Down the Thunder as the second best album of 1996. The Ithaca Journal said that Davis's "gruff voice, spry fingerpicking and command of traditional acoustic blues styles add up to one powerful package." The Sydney Morning Herald concluded that "the beautiful flourish of his performances and the genuine sincerity for his traditional musical culture are not the problem... Davis has yet to find his true voice."

AllMusic wrote that Davis's "slide playing is exceptional and at times very reminiscent of Robert Johnson."

== Track listing ==
No.	Title	Length
1.	"Georgia Jelly Roll"
2.	"I Got the Power"
3.	"When You Got a Good Friend"
4.	"Long Train"
5.	"Run Sinner Run"
6.	"Mama's Gonna Fix It Right"
7.	"Jelly Bone Jelly"
8.	"See Me When You Can"
9.	"Gee the Mule"
10.	"Minglewood Blues"
11.	"Thanksgiving Day"
12.	"The Road Is Calling"
13.	"New Shoes"
