= Give in Kind =

Studio album by Guy Davis
- Released: 2002
- Genre: Blues, country blues
- Label: Red House
- Producer: John Platania

Guy Davis chronology
Butt Naked Free (2000)	Give in Kind (2002)	Chocolate to the Bone (2003)

Give in Kind is an album by the American musician Guy Davis, released in 2002. It was his fifth album for Red House Records. Davis supported it with a North American tour. The album was nominated for a W. C. Handy Award for best "Acoustic Blues Album".

== Production ==
The album was produced by John Platania. Davis did not spend a lot of time on song selection, choosing what he liked, what others liked, and what was already worked out. He played banjo, six- and twelve-string guitars, and washboard; he played a didgeridoo on "Layla, Layla". Ken Whiteley contributed on mandolin. "Loneliest Road That I Know" is a version of Mississippi Fred McDowell's song "Highway 61". "What You Doin'" is a cover of the Sleepy John Estes song. "Good Liquor" is a cover the Big Bill Broonzy song. "Joppatowne" is about a prisoner returning to his hometown for a funeral. "I Will Be Your Friend" is a tribute to the Scottish musician Davy Steele, who died in 2001.

== Critical reception ==
Professional ratings
Review scores
Source	Rating
AllMusic	4.5/5 stars
The Atlanta Journal-Constitution	B+
Robert Christgau	(3-star Honorable Mention)
DownBeat	4/5 stars
The Gazette	4/5
The Penguin Guide to Blues Recordings	4/4 stars

Robert Christgau called the album "country blues in the spirit of friendship, like John Hurt did it." The Star Tribune wrote that "Davis continues his dogged but creative commitment to traditional acoustic blues." The Gazette determined that "Davis recalls the days when jug bands ruled Memphis's Beale St.," writing that his original songs "preserve and carry forward the tradition." The Birmingham Post opined that Davis "has an inbuilt empathy with the music, without any of the vaudeville hokum of Keb' Mo' or the sophisticated gloss of Eric Bibb." The Atlanta Journal-Constitution concluded that "his previous albums have sometimes been weighed down by an artificial vocal gruffness... Now he has found his voice."

AllMusic wrote that "he's listened hard to classic Delta blues and based his style on it, without ever becoming a carbon copy of the greats."

== Track listing ==
No.	Title	Length
1.	"Good Liquor"
2.	"Loneliest Road That I Know"
3.	"Lay Down By My Side"
4.	"I Will Be Your Friend"
5.	"(I Love My Job)"
6.	"Layla, Layla"
7.	"Honeydew Melon Rag"
8.	"Six Cold Feet of Ground"
9.	"Grandma Is Dancing"
10.	"What You Doin'"
11.	"Watch Over Me"
12.	"I Don't Know"
13.	"Don't You Leave Me Here"
14.	"(Joppatowne Intro)"
15.	"Joppatowne"
16.	"God's Unchanging Hand"
