= Ay Te Dejo en San Antonio y Más! =

Compilation album by Flaco Jiménez
- Released: 1990
- Recorded: 1979, May 1985
- Studio: Toby's (San Antonio, Texas), ZAZ (San Antonio)
- Genre: Tejano, Conjunto, Ranchera
- Length: 64:18
- Language: Spanish
- Label: Arhoolie
- Producer: Chris Strachwitz

Flaco Jiménez chronology
25 Golden Hits (1985)	Ay Te Dejo en San Antonio y Más! (1990)	Entre Humo y Botellas (1989)

Ay Te Dejo en San Antonio y Más! is the title of a compilation album released by American performer Flaco Jiménez. It was released in 1990 by Arhoolie Records and contains all of the songs from Jiménez's 1986 album Ay Te Dejo en San Antonio (Arhoolie, 3021) and most of the songs from his 1980 album El Sonido de San Antonio (Arhoolie, 3014).

For the original Ay Te Dejo en San Antonio album, Jiménez was awarded the Best Mexican-American/Tejano Music Performance at the 29th Annual Grammy Awards.

== Track listing ==
1. Ay Te Dejo en San Antonio – 2:51
2. Juárez – 4:15
3. Mentiste Cuando Dijiste – 3:23
4. El Barrelito – 2:42
5. Las Gaviotas – 3:17
6. Morir Soñando – 2:20
7. Rosa María – 2:29
8. Traigo un Recuerdo – 3:21
9. Amor de los Dos – 2:26
10. La Barranca – 2:26
11. Mujer Casada – 2:46
12. La Paloma – 2:37
13. El Cerrito – 2:09
14. Ni el Dinero Ni Nada – 4:14
15. Ángel Mío – 2:38
16. Grítenme Piedras del Campo – 3:39
17. Un Viejo Amor – 2:20
18. Tu Nuevo Cariñito – 2:43
19. El Gallito – 2:28
20. La Piedrera – 2:20
21. Spanish Eyes – 3:33
22. Vuelve a Quererme – 3:10

== Personnel ==
- Flaco Jiménez – accordion, vocals
- Eduardo Garcia – bajo sexto (tracks 1–10, 17, 18, 21, 22); vocals (track 7)
- Toby Torres – bajo sexto and vocals (tracks 1–10, 17, 18, 21, 22)
- Hugo Gonzales – bajo sexto and vocals (tracks 1–16)
- Joey Lopez – bajo sexto (tracks 11–16)
- Oscar Tellez – bajo sexto (tracks 19–22)
- Henry "Big Red" Ojeda – bass (tracks 1–10, 17, 18, 21, 22)
- Ruben Valle – bass (tracks 11–16)
- Francisco Salazar – bass (tracks 19, 20)
- Isaac Garcia – drums (tracks 1–8, 21, 22)
- Juan "Eddie Hurricane" Bosquez – drums (tracks 19–22)
- Fred Ojeda – vocals (tracks 11–16)

== Chart performance ==
For the original 1986 release:

Chart (1986)	Peak position
US Billboard Regional Mexican Albums	15
