= Fabrizio Poggi =

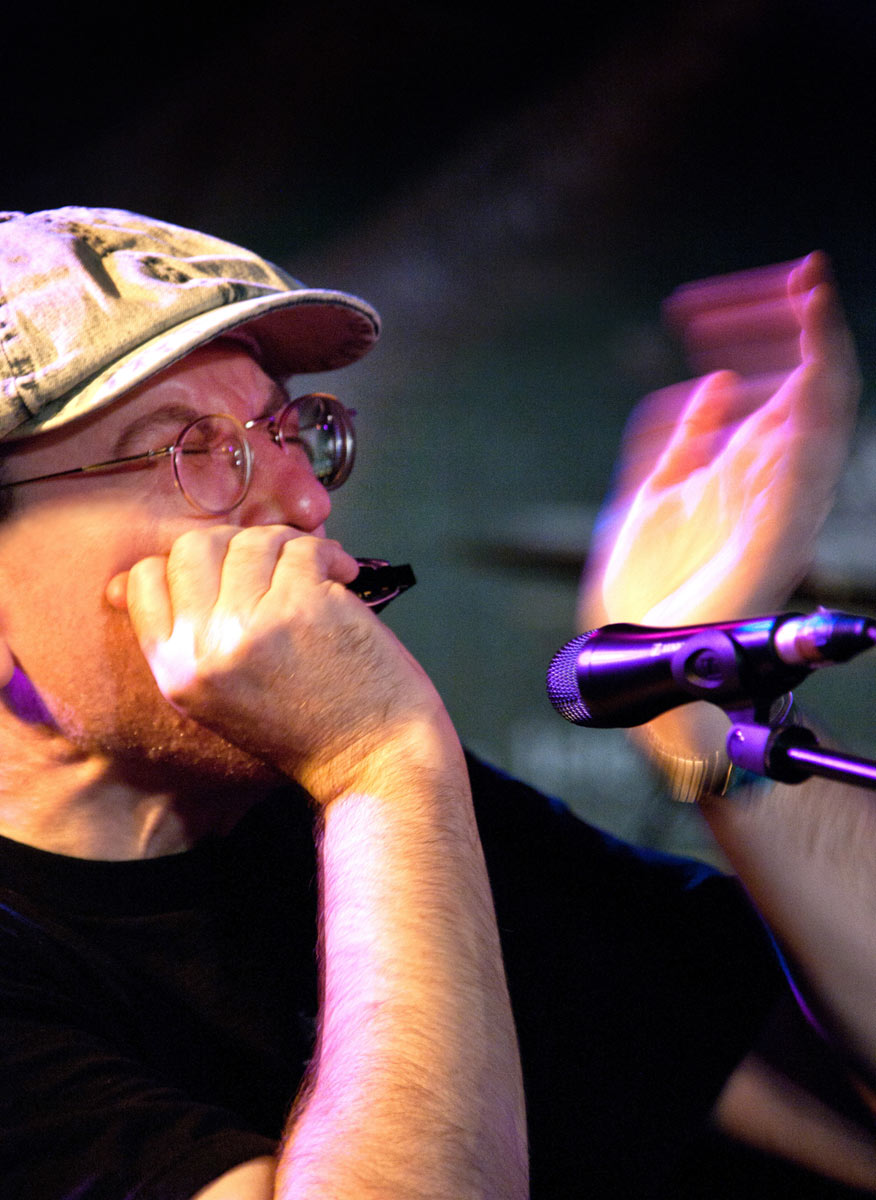
Fabrizio Poggi

Fabrizio Poggi (pronounced Pohjee) (born 1 July 1958) is a singer and harmonica player. He is a Grammy Awards nominee who has received the Hohner Lifetime Award, and has been two times Blues Music Awards nominee, and a Jimi Awards nominee. During his long career he has recorded twenty six albums. He has performed in the US and Europe with the Blind Boys of Alabama, Garth Hudson of the Band, Steve Cropper, Charlie Musselwhite, Ronnie Earl, John P. Hammond, Marcia Ball, Guy Davis, Eric Bibb, Flaco Jimenez, Little Feat and many others.

== Biography ==
Fabrizio Poggi's first recordings in the United States date back to 1997 in Texas with "Nuther World".

He was among the first Italian artists to do a long tour in the United States. Between 1998 and 2002 he toured in Texas and Louisiana. Among the areas that hosted his performances were The House of Blues in New Orleans; Threadgill's; Antone's; Doctor Rockit's in Corpus Christi; Gruene Hall Gruene Hall; and Luckenbach.

In 2006, he performed at the Center for Southern Folklore, Memphis. On that occasion he played at Ground Zero- the Red's Lounge Clarksdale, the Walnut Street Blues Bar Greenville as well as Greenwood at the Blue Parrot. In the same year, he participated on the CBS television show "Live at 9" from Memphis, and hosted the legendary radio program "King Biscuit Time".

In 2010, Poggi released "Spirit & Freedom", recorded mostly in the United States. Among the guests are The Blind Boys of Alabama; Flaco Jimenez; Garth Hudson (The Band); Charlie Musselwhite; Augie Meyers; Eric Bibb; Guy Davis; Billy Joe Shaver; Tish Hinojosa; Mickey Raphael; Kevin Welch; Kelley Mickwee; Debbi Walton; and Nora Guthrie (Woody Guthrie's daughter).

In 2011, Poggi released "Live in Texas", an album recorded entirely live in Texas. Among the guest musicians on the disc are: Flaco Jimenez; Marcia Ball; Floyd Domino; Ponty Bone; Debbi Walton; and Tommy Elskes.

He has published two books: Il soffio dell'anima (blues harmonica and blues harmonica players) published by Ricordi in 2005, and Angeli Perduti del Mississippi (stories and legends of the blues) published by Meridiano Zero in 2010, with the cover designed by Robert Crumb.

In 2011 and 2012, the US magazine, Blues Revue, chose him for an insert CD attached to the magazine, along with North Mississippi All Stars, Mavis Staples, Ruthie Foster and Bob Margolin. Harpway 61, an instrumental album dedicated to the harmonica was released in May 2012. Spirit of Mercy a collection of blues and spiritual songs from previous albums Mercy and Spirit & Freedom was released in In February 2013. Actor and musician Dan Aykroyd, the Elwood Blues of the Blues Brothers, called Poggi "an extraordinary harmonica player" in his radio broadcast "TheBluesMobile". In September 2013, he appeared both as a musician and as producer for Guy Davis' Juba Dance, which premiered at the BBC in London. The album came in first place in the ranking of most broadcasts by American Radio, and was nominated in the Blues Music Awards 2014 for Best Acoustic Album.

In 2014, he released Spaghetti Juke Joint featuring Ronnie Earl, Bob Margolin and Sonny Landreth.

2016 found him in Texas again to record Texas Blues Voices with guests Ruthie Foster; Miss Lavelle White; W.C. Clark; Carolyn Wonderland; Shelley King; Mike Zito; Bobby Mack; Donnie Price, and Dony Winn. In February 2016, he played at the Carnegie Hall with Guy Davis, Eric Burdon and Buddy Guy. In March 2017, MC Records released Sonny & Brownie's Last Train by Guy Davis and Fabrizio Poggi. A look back to Brownie McGhee and Sonny Terry. Poggi is also the producer of the record.

In November 2017, he was nominated for the 2018 Grammy Award for Best Traditional Blues Album of the Year.

In May 2018, he was nominated for a Blues Music Awards nominee for the album.

In June 2020, Appaloosa Records released For You.

In December 2020 he was nominated as Artist of the Year by the American magazine, Bluebird Reviews.

In February 2021 he was the first European to appear on the cover of the American magazine Blues Blast Magazine.

In May 2021, Appaloosa Records released Hope

In November 2022, Appaloosa Records released Basement Blues

In May 2023 he received a lifetime award from Milano Harmonica Rumble

In June 2024 Appalosa Records released the single "Every Life Matters" Fabrizio Poggi with Shar White

In June 2024 Arcana Edizioni released "BELIEVE. Conversations with Fabrizio Poggi" written by Serena Simula (in Italian)

In June 2024 Poggi was awarded with the Knight of Merit of the Italian Republic by President of Italy Sergio Mattarella for artistic merit.

In November 2024 Appalosa Records released the vinyl "Healing Blues".

In August 2026 the single BELLA CIAO A Partisan's Farewell by Rik Palieri and Fabrizio Poggi was released.

== Discography ==
=== Albums ===
Title	Year	Artist	Label
Mississippi Moon	(1993)	Chicken Mambo	Music On
Under the Southern Sky	(1995)	Chicken Mambo	Bon Ton Roulet
Heroes & Friends	(1997)	Chicken Mambo	Bon Ton Roulet
Nuther World	(1999)	Fabrizio Poggi & Chicken Mambo	Club de Musique
Songs for Angelina	(2001)	Fabrizio Poggi & Chicken Mambo	Music on
Canzoni popolari	(2002)	Fabrizio Poggi e Turututela	Dunya/Felmay
L'armonica a bocca: il violino dei poveri	(2003)	Fabrizio Poggi	Adolescere
Armonisiana	(2003)	Fabrizio Poggi	Ultrasound Records
The breath of soul	(2006)	Fabrizio Poggi & Francesco Garolfi	Ultrasound Records
La storia si canta	(2006)	Fabrizio Poggi e Turututela	Dunya/Felmay
Still Alive!	(2006)	Fabrizio Poggi & Chicken Mambo	Ultrasound Records
Mercy	(2008)	Fabrizio Poggi & Chicken Mambo	Ultrasound Records
Spirit & Freedom	(2010)	Fabrizio Poggi & Chicken Mambo	Ultrasound Records
Live in Texas CD + DVD Columblues Days	(2011)	Fabrizio Poggi & Chicken Mambo	Ultrasound Records
Harpway 61	(2012)	Fabrizio Poggi	The Blues Foundation
Spirit of Mercy: a Collection	(2013)	Fabrizio Poggi & Chicken Mambo	Ultrasound Records
Juba Dance	(2013)	Guy Davis & Fabrizio Poggi	Dixiefrog
Spaghetti Juke Joint	(2014)	Fabrizio Poggi & Chicken Mambo	Appaloosa Records
Il soffio della libertà	(2015)	Fabrizio Poggi	Appaloosa Records
Texas Blues Voices	(2016)	Fabrizio Poggi	Appaloosa Records
Compilation 2016 con inediti	(2016)	Fabrizio Poggi	Paviaphone
Sonny & Brownie's Last Train	(2017)	Guy Davis & Fabrizio Poggi	MC Records
For You	(2020)	Fabrizio Poggi	Appaloosa Records
Hope	(2021)	Fabrizio Poggi & Enrico Pesce	Appaloosa Records
Basement Blues	(2022)	Fabrizio Poggi	Appaloosa Records
Healing Blues	(2024)	Fabrizio Poggi	Appaloosa Records

=== Collaborations ===
- Punk prima di te with Enrico Ruggeri
- Rock 'n' Rouge with Enrico Ruggeri
- Amore e Guerra with Enrico Ruggeri
- Sogni e tradimenti with Renato Franchi
- Careless Moonlight with Mike Blakely
- West of You with Mike Blakely
- Down in Texas with Don McCalister
- All the Colours of My Blues with Mauro Sbuttoni
- Valigie di cartone with Germano Di Mattia
- The Rarest of the Breed with Mike Blakely
- The Hardest Truth with Penny Ney
- Sweet State of Mind with Debbi Walton
- Kokomo Kidd with Guy Davis
- Merry Christmas with The Joey Williams Project (The Blind Boys of Alabama)
- Finestre with Renato Franchi & Orchestrina del Suonatore Jones
- Le sette note del contrappasso with Matteo Bordiga
- Semplicemente Sacher - Sacher Quartet
- 50/50 - Mora & Bronski
- Oggi, Mi meritavo il mare - Renato Franchi & Orchestrina del Suonatore Jones
- Memphisto - Hubert Dorigatti
- Border guards - Katleen Scheir
- On the other side of water - Luca Burgalassi
- A - Blindur
- Morning Songs & Midnight Lullabies - Gospel Book Revisited
- Stop - Hubert Dorigatti
- Country Blues From Nepal - Prakash Slim
- Piccolo Romanticismo Scapigliato - Verdecane
- La luna del giorno dopo - Tiziano Cantatore
- Poor Boy - Hubert Dorigatti
- Papaveri Rossi
- For You - A Tribute to Bruce Springsteen
- In terra Zapatista
- Bar Italia
- Soffi d'ancia
- Celtica Volume 29
- Suoni dal mondo
- Concerto per il centenario della Cigl
- Concerto per la costituzione nata dalla Resistenza
- Deep Down Blues 2
- X-mas Evergreen Gospel Essentials, Vol. 2
- Acoustic Sunday Afternoon
- Blues Revue Cd Sampler Compilation April 2011 with the song I'm on My Way
- Blues Revue Cd Sampler Compilation April 2012 with the song King Biscuit Time
- Natale Pop 2001-2002-2003 Paviaphone
- The Blues Masters An Italian Tribute AAVV
- BELLA CIAO A Partisan's Farewell by Rik Palieri
