= Rare, Rarer & Rarest =

Compilation album by Blood Sweat & Tears
- Released: July 2, 2013
- Recorded: 1968–1975
- Genre: Rock
- Length: 57:16
- Label: Wounded Bird Records Sony Music WOU 3040
- Producer: James William Guercio, Roy Halee, Bobby Colomby, Jimmy Ienner, Thomas Z. Shepard

Rare, Rarer & Rarest is a compilation album by the band Blood, Sweat & Tears released by Wounded Bird Records/Sony Music on July 2, 2013. The songs here were recorded over an eight-year period and include mono single mixes, previously unreleased songs, and the music the band recorded for a film soundtrack from 1970.

The last half of this compilation includes the music from the movie soundtrack The Owl and the Pussy Cat. These songs were written and arranged by Dick Halligan and do not contain the dialog from the movie that was included on the original vinyl release. There are four outtakes from the soundtrack sessions included at the end of this collection.

== Reception ==
Professional ratings
Review scores
Source	Rating
Allmusic	2.5/5 stars

Writing for Allmusic, critic Jason Lymangrover wrote, "There are releases that will only appeal to fans, and there are releases for strict diehards. Wounded Bird's Rare, Rarer, & Rarest is intended for the latter; it's a compilation of 25 Blood, Sweat & Tears tracks that didn't make their albums; some for good reason."

== Track listing ==
1. "You've Made Me So Very Happy" [Mono Single Version] (Berry Gordy Jr., Brenda Holloway, Patrice Holloway, Frank Wilson) – 3:26
2. "Blues, Part II" [Mono Single Version] (David Clayton-Thomas, Fred Lipsius, Robert Colomby, Steven Katz) – 5:26
3. "More and More" [Mono Single Version] (Pea Vee Smith, Don Juan) – 2:38
4. "Spinning Wheel" [Mono Single Version] (David Clayton-Thomas) – 2:39
5. "And When I Die" [Mono Single Version] (Laura Nyro) – 3:26
6. "Hi-De-Ho" [Single Version] (Gerry Goffin, Carole King) – 4:05
7. "Got to Get You Into My Life" [Single Version] (John Lennon, Paul McCartney) – 3:09
8. "Kråkbergravningen (The Crow's Funeral)" (Barbro Lindgren, Georg Wadenius) – 3:48
9. "M" (David Clayton-Thomas, Fred Lipsius, Robert Colomby, Steve Katz) – 4:38
10. "The Confrontation [Instrumental Interlude, Part 1]" (Richard Halligan) – 2:19
11. "The Confrontation [Instrumental Interlude, Part 2]" (Richard Halligan) – 2:28
12. "The Warmup [Instrumental Interlude, Part 1]" (Richard Halligan) – :40
13. "The Warmup [Instrumental Interlude, Part 2]" (Richard Halligan) – 2:17
14. "The Seduction [Instrumental Interlude, Part 1]" (Richard Halligan) – :21
15. "The Seduction [Instrumental Interlude, Part 2]" (Richard Halligan) – :45
16. "The Morning After [Instrumental Interlude, Part 1]" (Richard Halligan) – 1:20
17. "The Morning After [Instrumental Interlude, Part 2]" (Richard Halligan) – 1:08
18. "The Morning After [Instrumental Interlude, Part 3]" (Richard Halligan) – 1:30
19. "The Reunion [Instrumental Interlude, Part 1]" (Richard Halligan) – 1:58
20. "The Reunion [Instrumental Interlude, Part 2]" (Richard Halligan) – :19
21. "Just Want To Mention (You've Been Alone Too Long) [The Owl and the Pussycat - Closing Credits]" (Richard Halligan) – 3:08
22. "The Owl and the Pussycat [Instrumental Interlude - Outtake 1]" (Richard Halligan) – 1:23
23. "The Owl and the Pussycat [Instrumental Interlude - Outtake 2]" (Richard Halligan) – 3:21
24. "The Owl and the Pussycat [Instrumental Interlude - Outtake 3]" (Richard Halligan) – :44
25. "The Owl and the Pussycat [Instrumental Interlude - Outtake 4]" (Richard Halligan) – :20

Tracks 10 through 21 were recorded for the film The Owl and the Pussycat

== Personnel ==
The Owl and the Pussycat – Personnel

- David Clayton-Thomas – Lead Vocals on "Just Want to Mention (You've Been Alone Too Long)"
- Steve Katz – Guitar, vocals
- Fred Lipsius – Saxophone, piano
- Chuck Winfield – Trumpet, flugelhorn
- Lew Soloff – Trumpet, flugelhorn
- [Jerry Hyman] – Trombone, bass trombone, baritone horn
- Dick Halligan – Organ, piano, flute, trombone
- Jim Fielder – Bass
- Bobby Colomby – Drums

== Production ==
- Compilation by Jeff James and Terry Wachsmuth
- Tracks 1 – 5: Produced by James William Guercio
- Track 6: Produced by Roy Halee and Bobby Colomby
- Track 7: Produced by Jimmy Ienner
- Tracks 8 – 9: Produced by Bobby Colomby
- Tracks 10 – 25: Produced by Thomas Z. Shepard
- Track 9 mixed by Sean Brennan at Battery Studios, New York City – previously unreleased
- Tracks 22 – 25 previously unreleased
- Tracks 10 – 25: Composed and Arranged by Richard Halligan
- Tracks 1 – 5: Released in 1969 by Columbia Records, a division of Sony Music Entertainment
- Tracks 6, 10 – 21: Released in 1970 by Columbia Records, a division of Sony Music Entertainment
- Track 7: ℗ 1975 Columbia Records, a division of Sony Music Entertainment
- Track 8: ℗ 1972 Columbia Records, a division of Sony Music Entertainment
- Track 9: ℗ 2013 Columbia Records, a division of Sony Music Entertainment
- Tracks 22 – 25: originally recorded in 1970 and released in 2013 by Columbia Records, a division of Sony Music Entertainment
