= Buena Suerte, Señorita =

Studio album by Flaco Jiménez
- Released: 1996
- Label: Arista Texas
- Producer: Cameron Randle, Flaco Jiménez

Flaco Jiménez chronology
15 Exitos (1995)	Buena Suerte, Señorita (1996)	Said and Done (1998)

Buena Suerte, Señorita is an album by the American musician Flaco Jiménez, released in 1996. It was released around the same time as the Texas Tornados' 4 Aces. The first single was "Borracho #1".

== Production ==
The album was produced by Cameron Randle and Jiménez. It was an attempt to recapture a rougher conjunto sound. Some of Buena Suerte, Señorita's songs were composed in the 1950s. All of its vocals are in Spanish; Jiménez sang lead on some songs.

Two of the songs are instrumentals. "Tico Taco Polka" is an homage to "Tico Tico Polka", a song performed on The Lawrence Welk Show. Oscar Tellez and Max Baca played bajo sexto and bass, respectively, on the album.

== Critical reception ==
Professional ratings
Review scores
Source	Rating
AllMusic	3/5 stars
Edmonton Journal	3/5 stars
Entertainment Weekly	B
MusicHound World: The Essential Album Guide	3/5 stars

The Austin Chronicle determined that "this is vintage Flaco with an all-star cast, making love to and on a passionate pillow of compressed air, the squeezebox between his arms." Entertainment Weekly wrote that, "by mixing polka and waltz rhythms with Mexican folk flavors, he conjures up images of old-world Europe and Mexican dance halls." The Ottawa Citizen concluded that "the accordion in the hands of Jimenez has wit and wisdom, but overall his album suffers from a sameness of tone."

The Los Angeles Times noted that Buena Suerte, Señorita "features rich conjunto-style vocal harmonies and a stripped-down 'garage band conjunto' feel." Texas Monthly deemed it "an exceptional back-to-basics piece of cantina fare—dusty, dirty conjunto that wraps vocal harmonies and a bajo-sexto twelve-string rhythm around Flaco’s pile-driving squeeze-box leads."

AllMusic called the album "good traditional accordion-based Tejano music from the king of the genre."

== Track listing ==
No.	Title	Length
1.	"Borracho #1"
2.	"Mala Movida"
3.	"Tico Taco Polka"
4.	"En Avión Hasta Acapulco"
5.	"Buena Suerte, Señorita"
6.	"El Gallo Copetón"
7.	"Dos Cosas"
8.	"Contigo Nomás"
9.	"Mis Brazos Te Esperan"
10.	"Swiss Waltz"
