= Skunkmello =

Studio album by Guy Davis
- Released: 2006
- Genre: Blues
- Length: 65:32
- Label: Red House
- Producer: John Platania

Guy Davis chronology
Legacy (2004)	Skunkmello (2006)	Down at the Sea Hotel (2007)

Skunkmello is an album by the American musician Guy Davis, released in 2006. He supported it with a North American tour. Skunkmello peaked at No. 12 on Billboard's Blues Albums chart. It was nominated for a Blues Music Award for "Best Acoustic Album".

== Production ==
The album was produced by John Platania. On many tracks Davis adopted the persona of "Samuel Skunkmello", a thief and lazy teller of tales. "Maggie Campbell Blues" is a cover of the Tommy Johnson song. "Going Down Slow" is a version of the St. Louis Jimmy Oden song. "Hooking Bull at the Landing" was inspired by a favorite phrase of Davis's father, Ossie Davis. "Uncle Tom Is Dead (Milk 'n' Cookies Remix)" is a remixed version of the 2004 NPR "Song of the Year".

== Critical reception ==
Professional ratings
Review scores
Source	Rating
DownBeat	5/5 stars
The Province	B

The Gazette wrote that "Davis is one of the finest contemporary practitioners of traditional blues and old-time musical styles." The Times Colonist noted that "Davis has been playing country blues so long that even his newly-penned original songs conjure up the music's 19th-century origins in the American South." DownBeat determined that the power of the music "rests in its awareness of the poise and dignity that characterized his ancestors in ungenerous white America and the pointed feelings it forces on his creative imagination." The Irish Times said that "the styles vary, but country blues is obviously where he lays his hat and the album fairly jumps with lively examples." The Province opined that "'The Chocolate Man' sounds like vintage Mississippi John Hurt, while 'Blues in the Midnight Hour' could be a Norah Jones hit."

== Track listing ==
Skunkmello track listing
No.	Title	Length
1.	"Natural Born Eas'man"	3:19
2.	"Going Down Slow"	8:41
3.	"The Chocolate Man"	3:55
4.	"It Takes Love to Make a Home"	5:12
5.	"Shaky Pudding"	3:03
6.	"Po' Boy, Great Long Ways from Home"	4:26
7.	"Blues in the Midnight Hour"	8:22
8.	"Blackberry Ramble"	2:42
9.	"Fonza Curry"	3:46
10.	"Maggie Campbell Blues"	3:24
11.	"Skunkmello's Dance of the Chickens"	4:26
12.	"Hooking Bull at the Landing"	4:22
13.	"Shooting Star"	5:08
14.	"Uncle Tom Is Dead" (Milk 'n' Cookies Remix)	4:46
Total length:		65:32
