= Butt Naked Free =

Studio album by Guy Davis
- Released: 2000
- Genre: Blues, acoustic blues, folk
- Label: Red House
- Producer: John Platania

Guy Davis chronology
You Don't Know My Mind (1998)	Butt Naked Free (2000)	Give in Kind (2002)

Butt Naked Free is an album by the American musician Guy Davis, released in 2000. The album title was inspired by a dance performed by Davis's son during the recording sessions, although it was ultimately selected by Red House Records. Davis supported the album with North American and United Kingdom tours. Butt Naked Free was nominated for a W. C. Handy Award for best "Acoustic Blues Album". The album was a success on public and college radio stations.

== Production ==
The album was produced by John Platania. Davis used a 12-string guitar on the album. Levon Helm played drums on some of the tracks; Tom Wolk contributed on bass. "Raining in My Soul" is dedicated to Oscar Brown III, the son of Oscar Brown. "Writing Paper Blues" is a cover of the Blind Willie McTell song. McTell was a chief influence on Davis's decision to tell stories through his songs. "Sometimes I Wish..." was inspired by Reverend Gary Davis's "Death Don't Have No Mercy".

== Critical reception ==
Professional ratings
Review scores
Source	Rating
AllMusic	4.5/5 stars
Calgary Herald	3/4 stars
Robert Christgau	(3-star Honorable Mention)
DownBeat	5/5 stars
The Encyclopedia of Popular Music	4/5 stars
The Gazette	4/5 stars
The Penguin Guide to Blues Recordings	4/4 stars

The Calgary Herald noted that "this is not blues for an all-night whiskey binge or for shaking your booty... It's more of a beer on the back porch, stroll in the park collection." The Gazette wrote that "Davis has evolved from a traditional revivalist into one of the pre-eminent singer-songwriter-guitarists in acoustic blues music." The Democrat and Chronicle called the album "a smooth ride on enchantingly shambling rhythms and Davis' voice: a phlegmatic-bluesman's rumble, salted with the gravel of the Southern roads of the music's heritage." The Times Colonist praised the "wise, passionate, organic reshaping of archaic forms." The Times stated: "A confident and assured songwriter, Davis uses the McTell pattern book to create his own tales of lowlife ways."

== Track listing ==
No.	Title	Length
1.	"Talkin' 'bout Wings 'n' Brew"
2.	"Waiting on the Cards to Fall"
3.	"Let Me Stay Awhile"
4.	"Writing Paper Blues"
5.	"Sometimes I Wish..."
6.	"High Flying Rocket"
7.	"Never Met No Woman Treats Me Like You Do"
8.	"Sugarbelle Blue"
9.	"Meet Me Where the River Turns"
10.	"My Rambling Ways"
11.	"Come On Sally Hitch a Ride"
12.	"Ain't No Bluesman"
13.	"The Place Where I Come From (Butt Naked Free)"
14.	"Raining in My Soul"
