= Guy Davis (musician) =

American musician (born 1952)

- Guy Davis at Hugh's Room in Toronto, Canada

Background information
- Born: May 12, 1952 (age 74)
- Origin: New York City, U.S.
- Genre: Blues
- Instruments: Vocals; guitar; banjo; harmonica
- Years active: 1978-present

Guy Davis (born May 12, 1952) is an American blues guitarist, banjo player, and two-time Grammy Award nominee. He is the second child and the only son of the actors Ruby Dee and Ossie Davis.

== Davis' roots ==
Davis says his blues music is inspired by the Southern speech of his grandmother. Though raised in the New York City area, he grew up hearing accounts of life in the rural South from his parents and especially his grandparents, and they made their way into his own stories and songs. Davis taught himself the guitar (never having the patience to take formal lessons) and learned by listening to and watching other musicians. One night on a train from Boston to New York, he picked up finger picking from a nine-fingered guitar player. His first exposure to the blues was at a summer camp in Vermont run by Pete Seeger's brother John Seeger, where he learned how to play the five-string banjo.

== Acting ==
Throughout his life Davis has had overlapping interests in music and acting. Early acting roles included a lead role in the 1984 film Beat Street opposite Rae Dawn Chong. He appeared on television as Dr. Josh Hall in One Life to Live from 1985 to 1986. Eventually, Davis had the opportunity to combine music and acting on the stage. He made his Broadway musical debut in 1991 in the Zora Neale Hurston/Langston Hughes collaboration Mulebone, which featured the music of Taj Mahal.

In 1993, he performed off-Broadway portraying the blues musician Robert Johnson in Robert Johnson: Trick the Devil. He received rave reviews and became the 1993 winner of the Blues Foundation's "Keeping the Blues Alive Award"; it was presented to him by Robert Cray at the W.C. Handy Awards ceremony.

Davis creates his own work: looking for more ways to combine his love of blues, music, and acting, Davis created material for himself. He wrote In Bed with the Blues: The Adventures of Fishy Waters—an engaging and moving one-man show. The Off-Broadway debut in 1994 received critical praise from The New York Times and the Village Voice.

Davis' writing projects have included a variety of theatre pieces and plays. Mudsurfing, a collection of three short stories, received the 1991 Brio Award from the Bronx Council on the Arts. The Trial (later renamed, The Trial: Judgement of the People), an anti-drug abuse, one-act play that toured throughout the New York City shelter system, was produced Off-Broadway in 1990, at the McGinn Cazale Theater. Davis also arranged, performed, and co-wrote the music for an Emmy Award-winning film, To Be a Man. In the fall of 1995, his music was used in the national PBS series, The American Promise.

In 2022, Davis wrote and performed Sugarbelly and Other Tales My Father Told Me. The one-man show was presented by Crossroads Theater and performed at the Arthur Laurents Theater in the New Brunswick Performing Arts Center in New Brunswick, New Jersey.

== Music ==
For the past two decades, Davis has concentrated on writing, recording, and performing music. In late 1995, he released his Red House records debut Stomp Down Rider, a live album. The album made top lists all over the country, including in the Boston Globe and Pulse magazine.

Davis's next album, Call Down the Thunder paid tribute to the blues masters but revealed more of his powerful originals. It too was named a top ten album of the year in the Boston Globe and Pulse. Acoustic Guitar said it was one of the "thirty essential CDs from a new generation of performers".

Davis' third Red House disc, You Don't Know My Mind which includes backing vocals by Olu Dara, explodes with passion and rhythm, and displays Davis' breadth as a composer and powerhouse performer. It was chosen as 'Blues Album of the Year' by the Association For Independent Music (formerly NAIRD). The San Francisco Chronicle gave the CD four stars, adding, "Davis' tough, timeless vocals blow through your brain like a Mississippi dust devil."

Charles M. Young summed up Davis's take on the blues writing in Playboy magazine: "Davis reminds you that the blues started as dance music. This is blues made for humming along, stomping your foot, feeling righteous in the face of oppression and expressing gratitude to your baby for greasing your skillet."

Davis's fourth album was Butt Naked Free, the first of his albums to have been produced by John Platania, former guitarist for Van Morrison. In addition to Platania on electric guitar, it includes musician friends such as Levon Helm, multi-instrumentalist, Tommy "T-Bone" Wolk; Carly Simon, 'Saturday Night Live' Band, drummer Gary Burke, and acoustic bassist, Mark Murphy. The musicians all performed "Waitin' On the Cards to Fall" from this album on the Conan O'Brien show.

Of the fifth album, Give in Kind, music critic Dave Marsh wrote, "Davis never loses sight of the blues as good time music, the original forum for dancing on top of one's sorrows. Joy made more exquisite, of course, by the sorrow from which it springs."

Ian Anderson, founder and lead singer of Jethro Tull liked the album and invited Davis to open for them during the summer of 2003. He wrote in his invitation, "Folk Blues (Sonny Terry, J.B. Lenoir) is where I started. Hearing Guy is like coming home again."

Notables who call themselves Davis fans include Jackson Browne, writer Maya Angelou, and actress Jessica Lange. Lange invited Davis to perform his cover version of the Bob Dylan song, "What's a Sweetheart Like You (Doing in a Dump Like This)" for a fundraiser that she and her husband Sam Shepard organized for Tibetan monks in Minnesota.

Chocolate to the Bone, Davis's sixth album followed. Accolades included a Blues Music Award nomination for "Best Acoustic Blues Album". Davis has been nominated for ten such awards over the years including for "Best Traditional Blues Album", "Best Blues Song" ("Waiting On the Cards to Fall") and as "Best Acoustic Blues Artist" two times.

His 2004 album, Legacy, was picked as one of the Best CDs of the Year by National Public Radio (NPR). The lead track on it, "Uncle Tom's Dead" was chosen as one of the Best Songs of the Year. The only other artist on both lists was Brian Wilson of the Beach Boys.

Illustrator Guy Davis drew the cover for this album. The tongue-in-cheek cartoon strip is included in the liner notes, is a collaboration between the two men. A winery in California completes the triumvirate, as it is headed by a winemaker also named Guy Davis. He created a limited edition wine in their honor with the label artwork done by illustrator Guy Davis.

Davis has contributed songs on a host of tribute and compilation albums, including collections on bluesmen Charley Patton and Robert Johnson, for Putumayo Records collections including, From Mali to Memphis and the children's album called, Sing Along With Putumayo, for tradition-based rockers such as the Grateful Dead, songwriters including Nick Lowe, and for Bob Dylan's 60th birthday CD called, A Nod to Bob, plus on a Windham Hill collection of choral music, and alongside performers including Bonnie Raitt, Jackson Browne, and Bruce Springsteen for a collection of songs written by Pete Seeger, called, Where Have All the Flowers Gone.

He has been involved with a famous project of his friend Larry Long, called I Will Be Your Friend: Songs and Activities for Young Peacemakers, in which Davis contributed to the title track. It is a CD collection of enriching songs combined with a teacher's aid kit to help teach diversity and understanding. It is all part of the national "Teaching Tolerance" campaign and continues to be distributed by the Southern Poverty Law Center, and sent to every public school in the country to help combat hatred.

== Recent projects ==
Davis wrote a couple of songs and recorded with Dr. John for Whoopi Goldberg's Littleburg series, and appeared and sang in Jack's Big Music Show, both for the Nickelodeon network, Nick Jr.

Davis has also done residency programs for the Lincoln Center Institute, the Kennedy Center, the State Theatre in New Jersey, and works with "Young Audiences of NJ", doing classroom workshops and assembly programs all across the country and in Canada for elementary, high school, and college students.

More recently, Davis appeared in the PBS special on the jazz and blues artist Howard Armstrong. His father Ossie Davis was a recipient of a Kennedy Center Honor, at which he received a medal alongside other recipients such as Warren Beatty, Elton John and composer John Williams from the President of the United States.

Davis appeared at New York City's Lincoln Center Out of Doors Festival in a history of the blues concert, "Evolution of the Blues", along with Michael Hill (Michael Hill's Blues Mob), Paul Peress, and Paul Ossola.

He also performed with Pete Seeger and Tao Rodríguez-Seeger at select venues, including a benefit concert that took place at McDaniel College in Westminster, Maryland in August 2008.

In 2012, Davis released an audio play called The Adventures of Fishey Waters: In Bed with the Blues. It is a compilation of "historical" tales in the form of a play accompanied by Davis in song.

In November 2016, Davis joined forces with fellow American Brooks Williams for a UK tour entitled 'Inside The Delta', a showcase of the many varied styles of the blues.

in 2017, his album Sonny & Brownie's Last Train with the Italian harmonicist Fabrizio Poggi received a Grammy Award nomination for best traditional blues album of the year, award won by Blue & Lonesome by the Rolling Stones.

== Awards ==
- Davis has received three Blues Music Award nominations as well as the Blues Foundation's "Keeping The Blues Alive" award in 1993 including:
  - "Best Acoustic Album of the Year"
  - "Best Acoustic Artist of the Year"
  - "Best Instrumentalist"
- 1991 BRIO award
- 1993 AUDELCO Award for Best Actor
- 2017 Grammy Award nomination for best traditional blues album of the year with Sonny & Brownie's Last Train with Fabrizio Poggi.
- 2021 Grammy nomination for Best Traditional Blues Album for Be Ready When I Call You

== Discography ==
- 1978: Dreams About Life (Folkways Records)
- 1984: Beat Street
- 1993: Guy Davis - Live, 1993 (The Music Hall)
- 1995: Stomp Down Rider (Red House Records)
- 1996: Call Down the Thunder (Red House Records)
- 1998: You Don't Know My Mind (Red House Records)
- 2000: Butt Naked Free (Red House Records)
- 2002: Give in Kind (Red House Records)
- 2003: Chocolate to the Bone (Red House Records)
- 2004: Legacy (Red House Records)
- 2006: Skunkmello (Red House Records)
- 2007: Down At The Sea Hotel (Secret Mountain)
- 2007: Guy Davis On Air (Tradition & Moderne)
- 2009: Sweetheart Like You (Red House Records)
- 2012: The Adventures of Fishy Waters (Smokeydoke Records)
- 2013: Juba Dance (DixieFrog Records)
- 2015: Kokomo Kidd
- 2015: Sonny & Brownie's Last Train with Fabrizio Poggi - Grammy Award nominee 2017
- 2019: Gumbo, Grits & Gravy
- 2021: Be Ready When I Call You
