= Flaco Jiménez =

American accordionist and singer (1939–2025)

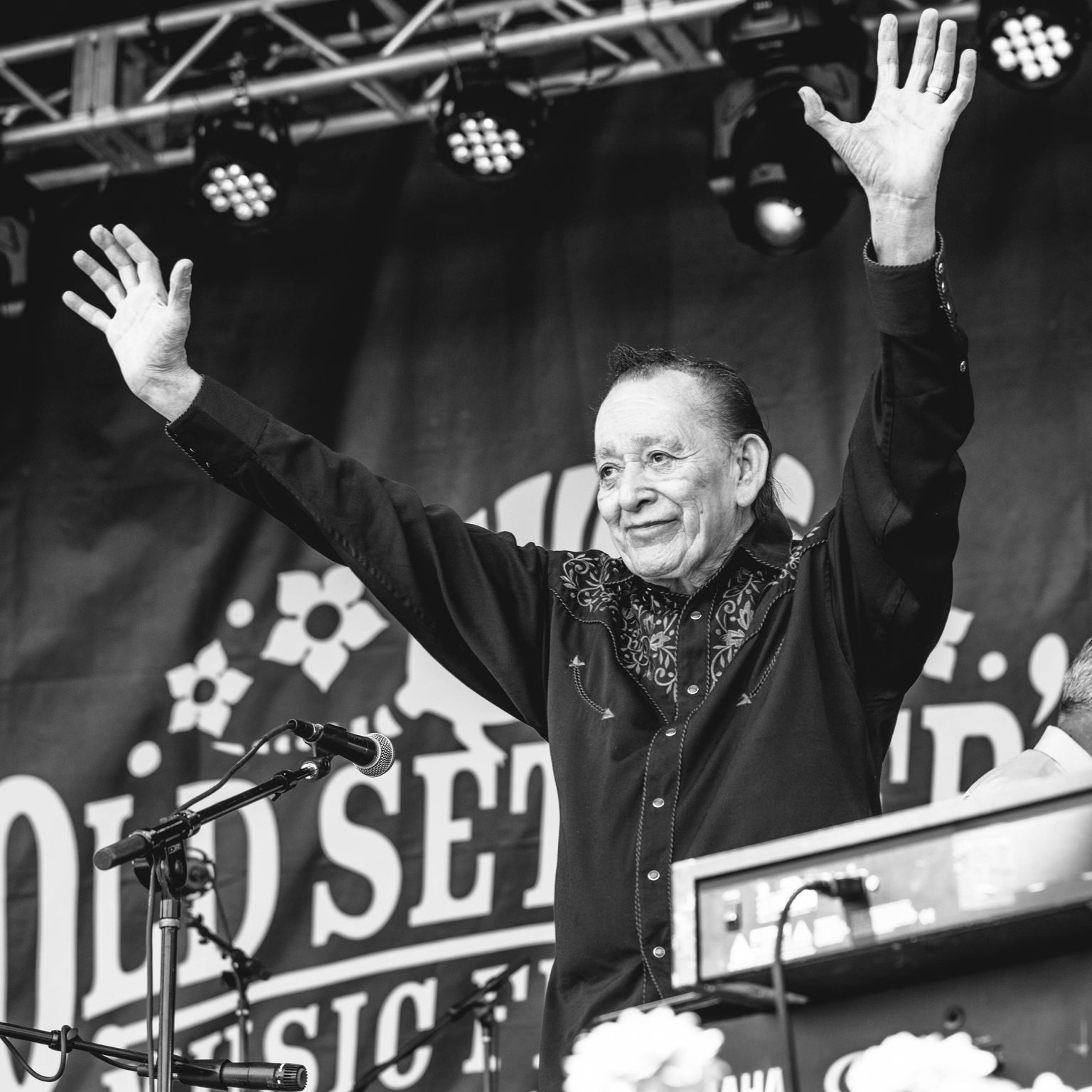
- Jiménez at Old Settlers Music Festival in 2022

Background information
- Born: Leonardo Jiménez; March 11, 1939; San Antonio, Texas, U.S.
- Died: July 31, 2025 (aged 86) San Antonio, Texas, U.S.
- Genres: Conjunto; norteño; tejano; country; rock
- Occupation: Musician
- Instruments: Accordion, bajo sexto, vocals
- Years active: 1946–2025
- Labels: Arhoolie; Arista; D.L.B.; Rounder; Virgin; Folkways
- Formerly of: Texas Tornados; Los Super Seven
- Website: Official website

Leonardo "Flaco" Jiménez (March 11, 1939 – July 31, 2025) was an American singer-songwriter and accordionist from San Antonio, Texas. The nickname 'Flaco' means 'skinny'. He is known for having played conjunto, norteño and tejano. Jiménez was a solo performer and session musician, as well as a member of the Texas Tornados and Los Super Seven.

Over the course of his seven-decade career, he received numerous awards and honors, including Lifetime Achievement Awards from the Grammys, Americana Music Awards, Tejano Music Awards, and Billboard magazine.

== Early life ==
Jiménez, who was of Mexican descent, was born in San Antonio, Texas, on March 11, 1939. He is descended from a line of musicians, including his father Santiago Jiménez Sr., and his grandfather Patricio Jiménez.

He began performing at the age of seven with his father, a pioneer of conjunto music, and began recording at age fifteen as a member of Los Caporales. Jiménez's first instrument was the bajo sexto, but he later adopted the accordion after being influenced by his father and zydeco musician Clifton Chenier.

He was given the nickname "Flaco" (which translates in English as "Skinny"), which was also his father's nickname.

== Career ==
Jiménez performed in the San Antonio area for several years and then began working with Doug Sahm in the 1960s. Sahm, better known as the founding member of the Sir Douglas Quintet, played with Jiménez for some time. Jiménez later went to New York City and worked with Dr. John, David Lindley, Peter Rowan, Ry Cooder and Bob Dylan. He appeared on Cooder's world music album Chicken Skin Music and was a guest musician on the Rolling Stones' Voodoo Lounge album. These appearances led to greater awareness of his music outside of America. After touring Europe with Cooder he returned to tour in America with his own band, and on a joint bill with Peter Rowan. Jiménez, Rowan and Wally Drogos were the original members of a band called the Free Mexican Airforce.

Jiménez appeared on the November 13, 1976 episode of NBC's Saturday Night with Cooder.

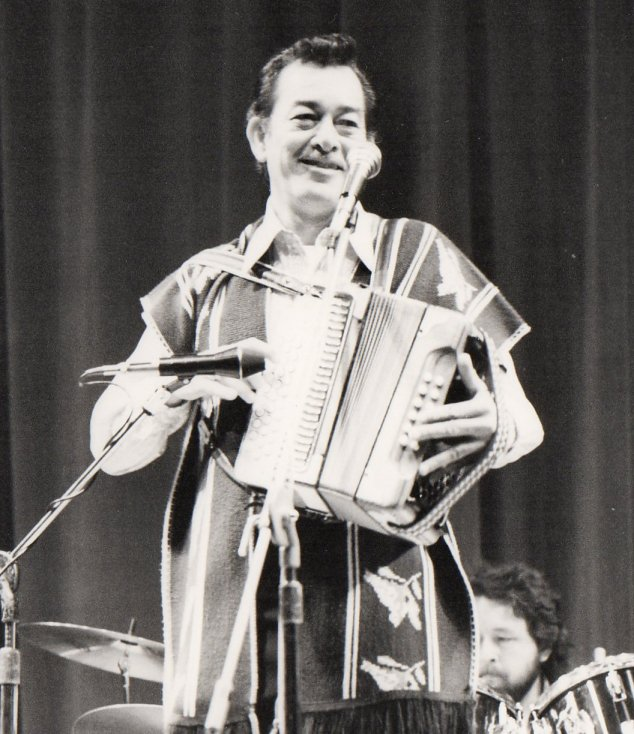
Jiménez on stage at Farnham, U.K., 1985 (on tour with Peter Rowan)

In 1988, he performed on the hit country single "Streets of Bakersfield" by Dwight Yoakam and Buck Owens. The song reached number 1 on the Billboard Hot Country Singles chart in 1988.

Jiménez won his first Grammy award in 1986 for his album Ay Te Dejo en San Antonio, whose title song was composed by his father. His third Grammy was for another song written by his father, "Soy de San Luis", recorded by the Tejano fusion group Texas Tornados with Augie Meyers, Doug Sahm and Freddy Fender.

Starting in 1998, he was a member of Los Super Seven, a supergroup that won a Grammy Award for their eponymous album.

Jiménez was one of the featured artists in the 1976 documentary film Chulas Fronteras, directed by Les Blank. He also appeared as a band member in the 2000 movie Picking Up the Pieces, with Woody Allen and Sharon Stone, and was also featured on the film's soundtrack. His music has been featured on the soundtrack for other movies, such as Y Tu Mamá También, El Infierno, The Border, Tin Cup, and Striptease.

He was one of the artists featured in archival footage in the 2013 documentary film This Ain't No Mouse Music about Arhoolie Records and its founder Chris Strachwitz.

The Hohner company collaborated with Jiménez to create the Flaco Jimenez Signature series of accordions.

Jiménez also received acclaim for his performances of Texas-Mexican Conjunto music, in addition to Tejano (Tex Mex) music.

== Personal life ==
His brother, Santiago Jiménez Jr., is also an accomplished accordionist and has recorded extensively.

In March 2015, Jiménez suffered a broken hip and two rib fractures from two separate falls. By May of that year, he returned to performing and was one of the acts on closing night of the 34th annual Tejano Conjunto Festival in San Antonio.

Jiménez and his wife once owned a food truck in the San Antonio area, named Tacos Jimenez.

Even during his time as a global ambassador for conjunto, Jiménez kept his home in San Antonio. For numerous decades, and until 2025, Jiménez performed at the annual Tejano Conjunto Festival in San Antonio.

A Texas music curator at the Wittliff Collections at Texas State University, Hector Saldaña, stated: "Flaco Jimenez was to San Antonio what Louis Armstrong was to New Orleans."

=== Death ===
Jiménez died following a long illness on July 31, 2025, at the age of 86. He had been living at the home of one of his sons.

== Discography ==
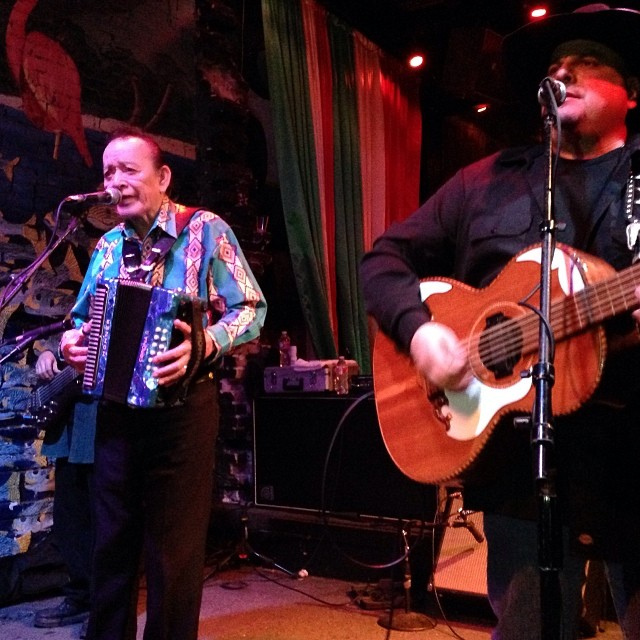
Jiménez and Baca, 2013

=== Studio albums ===
- Una Sombra, 1972, D.L.B. Records, San Antonio, TX
- El Papa Del Caminante, 1973, D.L.B.
- Mis Polkas Favoritas, 1973, D.L.B.
- Corridos Famosos, 1973, D.L.B.
- Clavelito Clavelito, 1973, D.L.B.
- La Otra Modesta, 1974, D.L.B.
- El Rey De Texas, 1975, D.L.B.
- A Mis Amigos Cariñosamente, 1976, D.L.B.
- El Principe Del Acordeón , 1977, D.L.B.
- Flaco Jiménez Y Su Conjunto, 1977, Arhoolie Records
- Flaco '79, 1979, D.L.B.
- Mis 25 Años, 1980, D.L.B.
- El Sonido de San Antonio, 1980, Arhoolie
- Polkas De Oro, 1983, D.L.B.
- Ay Te Dejo en San Antonio, 1986, Arhoolie
- Flaco's Amigos, 1988, Arhoolie
- Entre Humo y Botellas, 1989, Rounder Records
- San Antonio Soul, 1991, Rounder
- Partners, 1992, Warner Bros. Records
- Flaco Jiménez, 1994, Arista Records
- Buena Suerte, Señorita, 1996, Arista
- Said and Done, 1998, Virgin Records
- Arriba el Norte, 1998, Sound Records
- Sleepytown, 2002, Back Porch Records
- Squeeze Box King, 2003, Compadre Records
- Ya Volvi De La Guerra, 2009, Fiesta Records
- Flaco & Max: Legends & Legacies, 2014, Smithsonian Folkways Recordings

=== Live albums ===
- One Night at Joey's (Live), 1999, Sony Records

=== Compilations and re-releases ===
- El Rancho de la Ramalada, [release year unknown], Joey Records
- Ay Te Dejo en San Antonio y Más!, 1990, Arhoolie
- Un Mojado Sin Licencia and Other Hits From the 1960s, 1993, Arhoolie
- Flaco's First! (with Los Caminantes), 1995, Arhoolie
- 15 Exitos, 1995, Joey
- Best of Flaco Jiménez, 1999, Arhoolie
- Ultimo Tornado, 2001, Warner Bros.
- 20 Golden Hits, 2001, Hacienda Records
- Flaco's Favorites: 14 Fabulous Tracks, 2002, Fab14 Records
- Contiene Exitos, Prieta Case Se Me Olvido Otra Vez, 2003, Discos Ranchito
- Fiesta Del Rio, 2006, Fiesta
- Melodias, 2010, Joey
- Polkas y Mas..., 2010,

=== Featured on multi-artist compilation albums ===
- Tex-Mex Conjunto Classics, 1999, Arhoolie

=== Singles ===
Year	Single	Peak positions	Album
Year	Single	US Latin	Album
1992	"Me Está Matando"	38	Partners

=== Guest singles ===
Year	Single	Artist	Peak chart positions		Album
Year	Single	Artist	US Country	CAN Country	Album
1988	"Streets of Bakersfield"	Dwight Yoakam with Buck Owens	1	1	Buenas Noches from a Lonely Room
1992	"Gitana", "Gallo Rojo"	Los Fabulosos Cadillacs	-	-	El León
1996	"All You Ever Do Is Bring Me Down"	The Mavericks	13	15	Music for All Occasions

=== Participations ===
- 2013 : plays accordion on "Spirit of Mercy: a collection" by Fabrizio Poggi , Ultra Sound Records
- 2011 : plays accordion on "Live in Texas" by Fabrizio Poggi , Ultra Sound Records
- 2010 : plays accordion on "Spirit & Freedom" by Fabrizio Poggi , Ultra Sound Records
- 2007 : "My Name Is Buddy" (Nonesuch Records), by Ry Cooder, with Paddy Moloney, Van Dyke Parks, Mike & Pete Seeger, Bobby King & Terry Evans, Jim Keltner, Jacky Terrasson, Jon Hassell
- 1989 : Plays accordion on "New Pony" on the Orchestre Super Moth EP, The World At Sixes And Sevens, Rogue Records (12FMS 6–7).
- 1973 : plays accordion on Doug Sahm and Band, Atlantic

== Awards and honors ==
Between 1986 and 2015, Jiménez has won six Grammy Awards, including a Grammy Lifetime Achievement Award, plus an additional three nominations.

In 1999, Jiménez was awarded the Billboard Latin Music Lifetime Achievement Award.

In 2000, Jiménez won a Tejano Music Video of the Year award at the Tejano Music Awards for his song "De Bolon Pin Pon".

In 2001, both Flaco and his brother Santiago were included among the first group of recipients of the Texas Medal of Arts in the folk arts category.

Jiménez was awarded a Lifetime Achievement Award at the 31st Tejano Music Awards ceremony in 2011.

In 2012, he received a National Heritage Fellowship awarded by the National Endowment of the Arts, which is the United States government's highest honor in the folk and traditional arts.

In 2014, he received a Lifetime Achievement Award for Instrumentalist from the Americana Music Association. He received his plaque at the ceremony from longtime collaborator Ry Cooder, with whom he also performed at the event.

Jiménez was one of five artists to receive the inaugural Distinction in Arts honor from the City of San Antonio in 2015. Also in 2015, his collaborative album with Max Baca titled Flaco & Max: Legends & Legacies won an award in the Latin Album category at the 14th Annual Independent Music Awards.

Additionally in 2015, Jiménez was inducted into the Austin City Limits Hall of Fame.

In 2017, a photograph of Jiménez taken by Al Rendon in 1987 was added to the National Portrait Gallery of the Smithsonian Institution in Washington, D.C. Images in the Gallery "represent the numerous individuals who have made a significant impact on the history and culture of the United States".

In 2018, the Houston Chronicle listed him as number 19 of the Greatest 50 Texas Musicians of all time.

Jiménez received the Top of Texas Award from the Country Music Association of Texas in 2019. Earlier in the same year, he also received the History-Making Texas Award from the Texas State History Museum Foundation.

In 2020, Jiménez received the Chris Strachwitz Legacy Award from the Arhoolie Foundation.

In 2021, Jiménez's album Partners was selected as one of 25 works to be inducted into the National Recording Registry's class of 2020, with the registry calling Jiménez "a champion of traditional conjunto music and Tex-Mex culture who also is known for innovation and collaboration with a variety of artists."

In 2022, Jiménez was awarded the National Medal of Arts from U.S. President Joe Biden. However, he did not attend the award ceremony, citing illness.

=== Grammy awards ===
Year	Nominated work	Category	Result	Notes
1987	Ay Te Dejo en San Antonio	Best Mexican-American Performance	Won	solo album
1989	Flaco's Amigos	Best Mexican-American Performance	Nominated	solo album
1991	"Soy de San Luis"	Best Mexican-American Performance	Won	song by the Texas Tornados
1992	Zone of our Own	Best Country Performance by a Duo or Group with Vocal	Nominated	album by the Texas Tornados
1996	Flaco Jiménez	Best Mexican-American/Tejano Music Performance	Won	solo album
1996	"Cat Walk"	Best Country Instrumental Performance	Nominated	Lee Roy Parnell song, featuring Jiménez
1999	Los Super Seven	Best Mexican-American Music Performance	Won	album by Los Super Seven
1999	Said and Done	Best Tejano Music Performance	Won	solo album
2015	himself	Grammy Lifetime Achievement Award	Won	
