= Merrily We Roll Along (original Broadway cast recording) =

Cast recording by the original Broadway cast
- Released: March 1, 1982
- Label: RCA Red Seal

Merrily We Roll Along, subtitled Original Broadway Cast Recording, is an album containing a recording of Stephen Sondheim's 1981 musical Merrily We Roll Along made by its original Broadway cast. The album was released on March 1, 1982. on RCA Red Seal.

== Background ==
The album was produced by Thomas Z. Shepard.

== Critical reception ==
Professional ratings
Review scores
| Source | Rating |
|---|---|
| AllMusic | 4.5/5 stars |
| Billboard | (no rating) |

William Ruhlmann starts his contemporary review for AllMusic by noting that the musical was "more of a critical success, [...] than a popular one" and that "with [its] run of only 16 performances", it was even "an outright flop", Sondheim's "worst commercial failure [,,.] since Anyone Can Whistle ran nine performances in 1964," but finishes by: "In any case, the reason why the musical was remembered after those 16 performances and revived several times was Sondheim's score, which is one of his best. [...] This is one of those cast albums [...] that makes the listener marvel that the stage production could have failed when the music is so wonderful."

Back in December 1981, before the album's release, Billboard reported that RCA was "committed to releasing the original cast album" even though the musical was quickly cancelled, "taking the view that the demand for the [...] score" by "the premiere American show music writer" "could be more successful than the show itself." The magazine then reviewed the album in its issue from May 1, 1982. The reviewer started off by: "Although [the show] lasted only three weeks on Broadway [...], one can't easily dismiss a new score by Stephen Sondheim, who is Broadway's best composer and lyricist—by far, unfortunately," but concluded by commending the cast of "unknowns" and Thomas Z. Shepard's production. Moreover, while the reviewer was cautious about the musical merits of the musical, he noted that "as a lyricist, Sondheim [was] as deft as ever, especially with 'Bobby and Jackie and Jack'."

== Track listing ==
LP – RCA Red Seal CBL1-4197

All lyrics are written by Stephen Sondheim; all music is composed by Stephen Sondheim.

Side 1
| No. | Title | Length |
|---|---|---|
| 1. | "Overture" | 3:52 |
| 2. | "The Hills Of Tomorrow; Merrily We Roll Along (1980); Rich and Happy" | 10:21 |
| 3. | "Merrily We Roll Along (1979-1975); Old Friends; Like It Was" | 3:55 |
| 4. | "Merrily We Roll Along (1974-1973); Franklin Shepherd, Inc." | 5:33 |
| 5. | "Old Friends" | 4:36 |
| 6. | "Not a Day Goes By" | 2:22 |

Side 2
| No. | Title | Length |
|---|---|---|
| 1. | "Now You Know" | 4:08 |
| 2. | "Merrily We Roll Along (1964-1962); Good Thing Going" | 5:40 |
| 3. | "Merrily We Roll Along (1961-1960); Bobby and Jackie and Jack" | 5:09 |
| 4. | "Not a Day Goes By" | 2:19 |
| 5. | "Opening Doors" | 6:49 |
| 6. | "Our Time" | 4:09 |
| 7. | "The Hills of Tomorrow" | 2:15 |

== Awards ==
| Year | Award type | Categories | Results | Ref. |
|---|---|---|---|---|
| 1983 | Grammy Awards | Best Cast Show Album | Nominated | |
