= Ain't Misbehavin' (original Broadway cast recording) =

Cast recording by the original Broadway cast
- Released: 1978
- Recorded: 1978
- Studio: RCA Studio C
- Label: RCA Red Seal

An original Broadway cast recording of the 1978 musical Ain't Misbehavin', based on the life of Fats Waller, was issued the same year by RCA Records, peaking at number 161 on Billboard's Top LPs chart and won the Grammy in the "Best Cast Show Album" category.

== Background ==
Produced by Thomas Z. Shepard, the album was recorded in 1978 at the RCA Studio C, located in Manhattan.

== Critical reception ==
Professional ratings
Review scores
Source	Rating
AllMusic	4.5/5 stars

In a retrospective review on AllMusic, Sarah Erlewine commends the album for "captur[ing] the cabaret feel of the show that made it so charming and refreshing" and concludes: "An excellent recording."

== Chart performance ==
The album reached number 161 on the Billboard's Top LPs chart.

== Track listing ==
LP – RCA Red Seal CBL2-2965

Side 1
No.	Title	Length
1.	"Ain't Misbehavin'" (1929) "Lookin' Good but Feelin' Bad" (1929) "'Tain't Nobody's Biz-ness If I Do" (1922)	6:12
2.	"Honeysuckle Rose" (1929)	3:59
3.	"Squeeze Me" (1925)	3:36
4.	"Handful of Keys" (1933)	3:17
5.	"I've Got a Feeling I'm Falling" (1929)	3:34

Side 2
No.	Title	Length
1.	"How Ya Baby" (1938)	3:06
2.	"The Jitterbug Waltz" (1942)	5:49
3.	"The Ladies Who Sing with the Band" (1943)	2:37
4.	"Yacht Club Swing" (1938)	1:50
5.	"When the Nylons Bloom Again" (1943)	3:43
6.	"Cash for Your Trash" (1942)	2:10
7.	"Off-Time" (1929)	2:45
8.	"The Joint Is Jumpin'" (1938)	2:15

Side 3
No.	Title	Length
1.	"Entr'acte"	3:06
2.	"Spreadin' Rhythm Around" (1935)	2:15
3.	"Lounging at the Waldorf" (1936)	3:42
4.	"The Viper's Drag" (1934) "The Reefer Song" (Trad.)	5:20
5.	"Mean to Me" (1929)	3:03
6.	"Your Feet's Too Big" (1936)	3:08
7.	"That Ain't Right" (1943)	3:03

Side 4
No.	Title	Length
1.	"Keepin' Out of Mischief Now" (1932)	3:48
2.	"Find Out What They Like" (1929)	3:31
3.	"Fat and Greasy" (1936)	2:49
4.	"Black and Blue" (1929)	5:00
5.	"Finale": Songs by others which Fats Waller made hits "I'm Gonna Sit Right Down and Write Myself a Letter" (1933) "Two Sleepy People" (1938) "I've Got My Fingers Crossed" (1935) "I Can't Give You Anything but Love" (1928) "It's a Sin to Tell a Lie" (1933) "Honeysuckle Rose" (reprise)	7:11

== Charts ==
Chart (1978)	Peak position
US Billboard Top LPs	161

== Awards ==
Year	Award type	Categories	Results	Ref.
1979	Grammy Awards	Best Cast Show Album	Won	
