= Thomas Z. Shepard =

American record producer (born 1936)

Thomas Z. Shepard (born June 26, 1936) is an American record producer who is best known for his recordings of Broadway musicals, including the works of Stephen Sondheim. Shepard is also a composer, conductor, music arranger and pianist.

He has won twelve Grammy Awards and produced the original cast recordings of many of the Sondheim musicals, including Sweeney Todd, Company and Sunday in the Park with George, among others. He also produced the original cast recordings of 1776, La Cage aux Folles, Chicago and 42nd Street, among over a hundred others. He has produced hundreds of classical music and popular music recordings.

== Education and early career ==
Shepard attended The Juilliard School's preparatory division, training in piano and composition, leaving after his third year, in 1949. He studied at Hunter College, the New School for Social Research and Oberlin College, again studying piano and, privately, composition, receiving his B.A., Music, in 1958. He then continued his studies in 1959 at the Yale School of Music. Among his composition teachers were Quincy Porter and Mel Powell. He married Irene Clark at Stephen Wise Free Synagogue (New York) on 4 December 1960.

Beginning in 1960, Shepard worked for fourteen years for Columbia Records, eventually becoming co-director of CBS Masterworks. He joined RCA Records in 1974, where he was Division Vice President of RCA Red Seal, responsible for recording, signing and marketing of the label, until 1986. He was then Vice President: Classical and Theatrical until 1989 for MCA Records in New York, where he created their classical and theatrical record line. Shepard then became an independent producer, wrote, narrated and produced The WQXR/MCA Classics Listener's Guide (1988; music appreciation recordings) and has lectured on musical theatre and classical music.

== Producer and composer ==
Shepard has produced numerous classical and Broadway cast albums, winning 12 Grammy Awards, including four with songs by Stephen Sondheim. In 1984, he received the NARAS Governors' Award for Lifetime Achievement, and in 1986, he won a Drama Desk Special Award "for preserving musical theater heritage on record." Shepard received two Emmy Award nominations for songs he composed for the PBS television show Between the Lions (2007). He has also produced live concert events, most recently My Fair Lady in 2007, and Camelot in 2008, with the New York Philharmonic, broadcast on PBS as part of the Live from Lincoln Center series. Shepard has arranged music and conducted for Anna Moffo, Richard Kiley, the Norman Luboff Choir and Richard Tucker, among others. He performed as a pianist at various concert venues, and his recording of classical piano pieces and improvisations, "Love on a Stormy Weekend", was released by Planet Earth Recording Co. in 1998.

Shepard is the composer of five musicals and five operas, among other pieces. The operas include That Pig of a Molette (1988) and A Question of Faith (1990), both with libretti by Sheldon Harnick, which were presented as a double-bill under the title Love in Two Countries at St. Peter's Church Theatre, in New York City, by Musical Theater Works in 1991; and a score for the lost music of Thespis (2008), which has been called "a love letter to [Gilbert and Sullivan] and ... might be better than the original". In 1971, he composed the motion picture score for Such Good Friends, directed by Otto Preminger, and in 1974, he wrote a children's cantata, In the Night Kitchen, with words by Maurice Sendak. He also composed the piano folio Folk a la Classique for Carl Fischer Music (2003; original compositions for children) and was the composer and lyricist for children's educational material for the Carnegie Hall Explorers Division, The Children’s Symphony (2004, intended to teach the instruments of the orchestra to second-and third-grade schoolchildren) and for the PBS television show Between the Lions (2007).

== Books ==
- Recording Broadway: A Life in Cast Albums (with Gayden Wren), Rowman & Littlefield (Applause imprint) (2024) ISBN 978-1-4930-8125-7

== Selected list of recordings produced ==
Shepard has produced numerous musical theatre, classical and opera albums, including the following. (G) indicates a Grammy Award winner.

- Show Boat (1962, studio with John Raitt and Barbara Cook)
- The King and I (1964, studio with Theodore Bikel and Barbara Cook)
- Bajour (1964)
- Wozzeck, (G) 1967 – Best Classical Album and (G) 1967 – Best Opera Recording
- George M! (1968)
- Zorba (1968)
- 1776 (1969)
- Dames at Sea (1969)
- Dear World (1969)
- Company, (G) 1970 – Best Musical Show Album
- The Sesame Street Book & Record, (G) 1970 – Best Recording for Children (also RIAA Gold Record; the first Sesame Street recording)
- Scrooge (soundtrack, conducted by Ian Fraser) (1970)
- Company (1970)
- The Rothschilds (1970)
- Two by Two (1970)
- 70, Girls, 70 (1971)
- No, No, Nanette (1971)
- Bartók: Concerto for Orchestra, (G) 1973 – Best Classical Album (Album of the Year; Best Engineering; Best Orchestra Recording)
- Irene (1973)
- Raisin (1973) (G) – Best Cast Show Album
- Candide (1974, revival)
- Goodtime Charley (1975)
- A Little Night Music (1975, London)
- Pacific Overtures (1976)
- Porgy and Bess, (G) 1977 – Best Opera Recording
- The King and I (1977, revival)
- Ain't Misbehavin', (G) 1978 – Best Cast Show Album
- Sweeney Todd, (G) 1979 – Best Cast Show Album; selected for the National Recording Registry
- 42nd Street (1980)
- Merrily We Roll Along (1981)
- Mahler: Sym. No. 7 In E Min., (G) 1982 – Best Orchestral Performance
- A Stephen Sondheim Evening (1983, concert)
- La Cage Aux Folles (1983)
- Sunday in the Park with George, (G) 1984 – Best Cast Show Album
- Me and My Girl (1986, revival)
- Follies in Concert, (G) 1986 – Best Musical Cast Show Album
- Song and Dance (1986)
- Carousel (1987, studio with The Royal Philharmonic Orchestra)
- Romance/Romance (1988)
- The Secret Garden (1991)
- Jelly's Last Jam (1992)
- Crazy for You (1992)
- Annie Warbucks (1993)
- Damn Yankees (1994, revival)
- Victor/Victoria (1995)
- Kiss of the Spider Woman (1995, with Vanessa L. Williams)
- Man of La Mancha (1996, studio with Plácido Domingo and Mandy Patinkin)
- Wings (1996)
- Swinging on a Star (1996)
- Chicago (1998, London)
- Annie (2013)
- Anna Christie (2019)

Shepard's classical music recordings include albums with Leonard Bernstein, Pierre Boulez and others, and his albums of popular music include, among others:

- Harold Arlen and Barbra Streisand – Harold Sings Arlen (1966);
- Leontyne Price – God Bless America (1982);
- Barbara Cook – The Disney Album (1988);
- The Boston Pops – Music of the Night (1990);
- Betty Buckley – An Evening at Carnegie Hall (1996); and
- Julie Andrews – Classic Julie (2001).

In addition, Shepard contributed to the early 1970s "switched-on" cycle of synthesized electronic classical albums, with Everything You Always Wanted to Hear on the Moog* (*but were afraid to ask for), in collaboration with Andrew Kazdin (1973). In the 1990s, he also produced several albums for Sony Classical, with conductor John Williams and The Boston Pops, including The Star Wars Trilogy (Skywalker Orchestra); The Spielberg-Williams Collaboration; I Love a Parade; Kismet, starring Samuel Ramey, Jerry Hadley, Dom DeLuise, Ruth Ann Swenson and Julia Migenes; and The Green Album, among others.
