= Johnny Depp filmography =

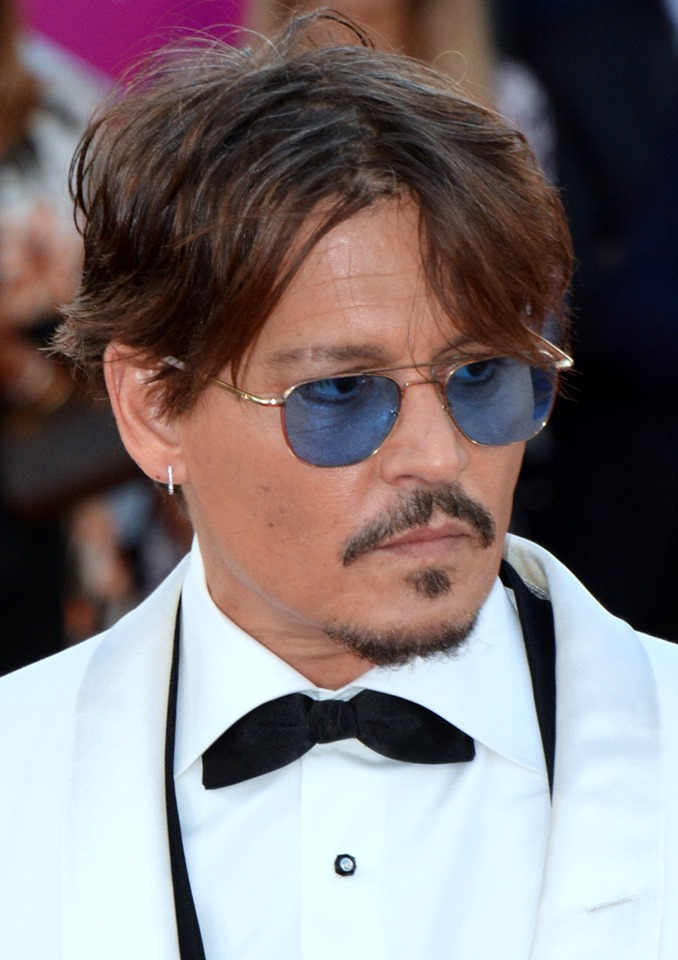
Depp at the 2019 Deauville American Film Festival

American actor Johnny Depp made his film debut in the horror film A Nightmare on Elm Street in 1984. In the two following years, Depp appeared in the comedy Private Resort (1985), the war film Platoon (1986), and Slow Burn (1986). A year later, he started playing his recurring role as Officer Tom Hanson in the police procedural television series 21 Jump Street (1987–1990) which he played until the middle of season 4, and during this time, he experienced a rapid rise as a professional actor.

In 1990, he starred as the title character in the films Cry-Baby and Edward Scissorhands. Throughout the rest of the decade, Depp portrayed lead roles in: Arizona Dream (1993), What's Eating Gilbert Grape (1993), Benny & Joon (1993), Dead Man (1995) and title characters Ed Wood (1994), Don Juan DeMarco (1995), The Brave (1997) and Donnie Brasco (1997). He also starred in: Fear and Loathing in Las Vegas (1998) as Hunter S. Thompson, The Ninth Gate (1999) as Dean Corso, and Sleepy Hollow (1999) as Ichabod Crane.

In the early 2000s, he appeared in the romance Chocolat (2000), crime film Blow (2001), action film Once Upon a Time in Mexico (2003), drama Finding Neverland (2004), and horror films From Hell and Secret Window (2004). In addition, Depp portrayed the title character in Sweeney Todd: The Demon Barber of Fleet Street (2007) and appeared in Public Enemies (2009). In 2003, he portrayed Captain Jack Sparrow in the Pirates of the Caribbean series, starting with The Curse of the Black Pearl, and reprised the role in four sequels (2006–2017), becoming one of his most famous roles. For each performance in The Curse of the Black Pearl, Finding Neverland, and Sweeney Todd, Depp was nominated for an Academy Award for Best Actor. He also portrayed Willy Wonka and Tarrant Hightopp in the fantasy films Charlie and the Chocolate Factory (2005) and Alice in Wonderland (2010) which each garnered over $474 million and $1 billion at the box office, respectively.

In 2010, he went on to star in The Tourist with Angelina Jolie and was nominated for a Golden Globe Award for Best Actor in a Motion Picture Comedy. He starred in Dark Shadows (2012) with Michelle Pfeiffer, The Lone Ranger (2013) with Armie Hammer, and Transcendence (2014) with Morgan Freeman. He reprised his role as the Tarrant Hightopp in Alice Through the Looking Glass (2016) and starred in the drama Minamata (2020). Beginning in 2011, he has produced films through his company Infinitum Nihil. He has also lent his voice to the animated series King of the Hill in 2004, SpongeBob SquarePants in 2009, and Family Guy in 2012, in addition to the animated film Rango (2011). Moreover, Depp has appeared in many documentary films, mostly as himself.

== Film ==
List of films
Year	Title	Role	Notes	Ref.
1984	A Nightmare on Elm Street	Glen Lantz		
1985	Private Resort	Jack Marshall		
1986	Platoon	Lerner		
1990	Cry-Baby	Wade "Cry-Baby" Walker		
1990	Edward Scissorhands	Edward Scissorhands		
1991	Freddy's Dead: The Final Nightmare	Guy on TV	Cameo; credited as Oprah Noodlemantra	
1993	Arizona Dream	Axel Blackmar		
1993	Benny & Joon	Sam		
1993	What's Eating Gilbert Grape	Gilbert Grape		
1994	Ed Wood	Ed Wood		
1995	Don Juan DeMarco	Don Juan DeMarco		
1995	Dead Man	William Blake		
1995	Nick of Time	Gene Watson		
1996	Cannes Man	Himself	Cameo	
1997	The Brave	Raphael	Also director and co-writer	
1997	Donnie Brasco	Joseph D. Pistone / Donnie Brasco		
1998	Fear and Loathing in Las Vegas	Raoul Duke		
1999	The Ninth Gate	Dean Corso		
1999	The Astronaut's Wife	Commander Spencer Armacost		
1999	Sleepy Hollow	Ichabod Crane		
2000	Chocolat	Roux		
2000	Before Night Falls	Bon Bon / Lieutenant Victor		
2000	The Man Who Cried	Cesar		
2001	Blow	George Jung		
2001	From Hell	Inspector Frederick Abberline		
2003	Pirates of the Caribbean: The Curse of the Black Pearl	Captain Jack Sparrow		
2003	Once Upon a Time in Mexico	Sheldon Sands		
2004	Secret Window	Mort Rainey		
2004	Happily Ever After	L'inconnu	Cameo	
2004	The Libertine	Rochester		
2004	Finding Neverland	Sir James Matthew Barrie		
2005	Charlie and the Chocolate Factory	Willy Wonka		
2005	Corpse Bride	Victor Van Dort	Voice role	
2006	Pirates of the Caribbean: Dead Man's Chest	Captain Jack Sparrow		
2007	Pirates of the Caribbean: At World's End	Captain Jack Sparrow		
2007	Sweeney Todd: The Demon Barber of Fleet Street	Sweeney Todd		
2009	The Imaginarium of Doctor Parnassus	Imaginarium Tony #1		
2009	Public Enemies	John Dillinger		
2010	Alice in Wonderland	Tarrant Hightopp/The Mad Hatter		
2010	The Tourist	Frank Tupelo / Alexander Pearce		
2011	Rango	Rango, Lars, Raoul Duke (cameo)	Voices	
2011	Pirates of the Caribbean: On Stranger Tides	Captain Jack Sparrow		
2011	The Rum Diary	Paul Kemp	Also producer	
2011	Hugo	—N/a	Producer	
2012	21 Jump Street	Tom Hanson	Uncredited cameo	
2012	Dark Shadows	Barnabas Collins	Also producer	
2013	The Lone Ranger	Tonto	Also executive producer	
2013	Lucky Them	Matthew Smith	Cameo	
2014	Transcendence	Will Caster		
2014	Tusk	Guy Lapointe		
2014	Into the Woods	Wolf		
2015	Mortdecai	Charlie Mortdecai	Also producer	
2015	Black Mass	James "Whitey" Bulger		
2016	Alice Through the Looking Glass	Tarrant Hightopp/The Mad Hatter		
2016	Fantastic Beasts and Where to Find Them	Gellert Grindelwald	Cameo	
2016	Yoga Hosers	Guy Lapointe		
2016	Donald Trump's The Art of the Deal: The Movie	Donald Trump		
2017	The Black Ghiandola	Nuclear Med Tech	Short film	
2017	Murder on the Orient Express	Edward Ratchett		
2017	Pirates of the Caribbean: Dead Men Tell No Tales	Captain Jack Sparrow		
2018	London Fields	Chick Purchase	Cameo	
2018	Sherlock Gnomes	Sherlock Gnomes	Voice role	
2018	Fantastic Beasts: The Crimes of Grindelwald	Gellert Grindelwald		
2018	The Professor	Richard Brown		
2018	City of Lies	Russell Poole	Also executive producer	
2019	Waiting for the Barbarians	Colonel Joll		
2020	Minamata	W. Eugene Smith	Also producer	
2023	Jeanne du Barry	Louis XV	Also producer	
2024	Johnny Puff: Secret Mission	Johnny Puff	Voice role	
2024	Modì, Three Days on the Wing of Madness	—N/a	Director and producer	
2026	Ebenezer	Ebenezer Scrooge		
2027	Day Drinker †	Mr. Kelly	Post-production	

Key
†	Denotes works that have not yet been released

== Television ==
List of television series
Year	Title	Role	Notes	Ref(s)
1985	Lady Blue	Lionel Viland	Episode: "Beasts of Prey"	
1986	Slow Burn	Donnie Fleischer	Television film	
1987	Hotel	Rob Cameron	Episode: "Unfinished Business"	
1987–1990	21 Jump Street	Officer Tom Hanson	80 episodes	
1999	The Vicar of Dibley	Himself	Episode: "Celebrity Party"	
2000	The Fast Show	Customer in suit store	Episode: "The Last Ever Fast Show"	
2004	King of the Hill	Yogi Victor (voice)	Episode: "Hank's Back"	
2009	SpongeBob SquarePants	Jack Kahuna Laguna (voice)	Episode: "SpongeBob SquarePants vs. The Big One"	
2011	Life's Too Short	Himself	Episode Two	
2012	Family Guy	Edward Scissorhands (voice)	Episode: "Lois Comes Out of Her Shell"	
2020	Puffins	Johnny Puff (voice)	Animated shorts	
2022	Puffins Impossible	Johnny Puff (voice)	Animated shorts	

== Video games ==
List of video games
Year	Title	Voice role	Notes	Ref
2006	Pirates of the Caribbean: The Legend of Jack Sparrow	Captain Jack Sparrow		
2011	Lego Pirates of the Caribbean: The Video Game	Captain Jack Sparrow	Archived audio	

== Theme park attractions ==
Year	Title	Role	Venue
2006	Pirates of the Caribbean	Captain Jack Sparrow	Disneyland; Walt Disney World
2012	The Legend of Captain Jack Sparrow	Captain Jack Sparrow	Disney's Hollywood Studios

== Documentaries ==
List of documentary films
Year	Title	Role	Notes	Ref(s)
1993	Stuff	N/A	Director and writer only	
1999	The Source	Jack Kerouac		
2002	Lost in La Mancha	Himself	Uncredited	
2003	Breakfast with Hunter	Himself		
2003	Charlie: The Life and Art of Charles Chaplin	Himself		
2004	The Buried Secret of M. Night Shyamalan	Himself		
2006	Buy the Ticket, Take the Ride: Hunter S. Thompson on Film	Himself		
2006	Deep Sea 3D	Narrator		
2006	When the Road Bends… Tales of a Gypsy Caravan	Himself		
2007	Joe Strummer: The Future Is Unwritten	Himself		
2007	Runnin' Down a Dream	Himself		
2008	Gonzo: The Life and Work of Dr. Hunter S. Thompson	Narrator		
2010	When You're Strange	Narrator		
2012	For No Good Reason	Himself		
2012	Radioman	Himself		
2012	Sunset Strip	Himself		
2013	Don't Say No Until I Finish Talking: The Story of Richard D. Zanuck	Himself		
2014	Don Rickles: One Night Only	Himself	Television documentary	
2016	Doug Stanhope: No Place Like Home	—	Executive producer only	
2017	Doug Stanhope: The Comedians' Comedian's Comedians	—	Executive producer only	
2018	Platoon: Brothers in Arms	Himself		
2020	Crock of Gold: A Few Rounds with Shane MacGowan	Himself	Also producer	
2022	Savage X Fenty Show	Himself		
2024	Chaplin: Spirit of The Tramp	Himself		

== See also ==
- List of awards and nominations received by Johnny Depp
