= Johnny Depp =

American actor (born 1963)

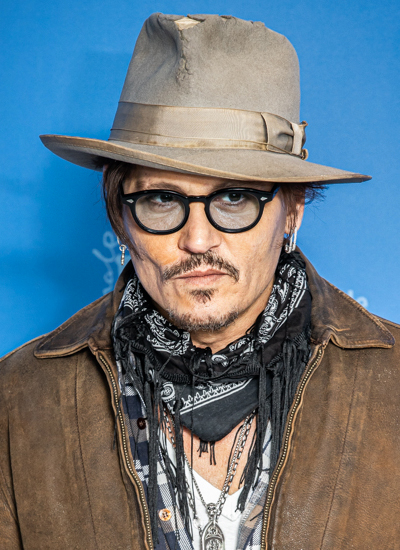
- Depp in 2020
- Born: John Christopher Depp II; June 9, 1963 (age 63); Owensboro, Kentucky, U.S.
- Occupations: Actor; musician; painter; film producer; director
- Years active: 1984–present
- Works: Filmography
- Spouses: Lori Allison (m. 1983; div. 1985); Amber Heard (m. 2015; div. 2017)
- Partner(s): Sherilyn Fenn (1985–1988); Winona Ryder (1989–1993); Kate Moss (1994–1998); Vanessa Paradis (1998–2012)
- Children: 2, including Lily-Rose
- Awards: Full list
- Musical career
- Genres: Alternative rock; hard rock
- Instruments: Guitar; vocals
- Labels: Republic; Capitol
- Member of: Hollywood Vampires
- Formerly of: Rock City Angels; P

John Christopher Depp II (born June 9, 1963) is an American actor, musician, and filmmaker. He is the recipient of multiple accolades, including an Actor Award and a Golden Globe Award as well as nominations for three Academy Awards and two British Academy Film Awards. His films, in which he has often played eccentric and unconventional characters have grossed over $10.8 billion worldwide. He is also known for his collaborations with filmmaker Tim Burton with whom he has collaborated with on multiple projects, often portraying gothic, dark fantasy, and macabre characters.

Depp began his career as a musician performing in several amateur rock bands before making his feature film debut in the horror film A Nightmare on Elm Street (1984). He then acted in Platoon (1986) before rising to prominence as a teen idol on the television series 21 Jump Street (1987–1990). Depp portrayed lead roles in Arizona Dream (1993), What's Eating Gilbert Grape (1993), Benny & Joon (1993), Dead Man (1995), Donnie Brasco (1997), Fear and Loathing in Las Vegas (1998), The Ninth Gate (1999), Chocolat (2000), and Blow (2001). During this time, Depp became known for his work with director Tim Burton, collaborating on eight films together, starting with Edward Scissorhands (1990), followed by Ed Wood (1994), Sleepy Hollow (1999), Charlie and the Chocolate Factory (2005), Corpse Bride (2005), Sweeney Todd: The Demon Barber of Fleet Street (2007), Alice in Wonderland (2010) and Dark Shadows (2012).

Depp gained worldwide stardom for his role as Jack Sparrow in the Pirates of the Caribbean film series (2003–2017). He earned three nominations for the Academy Award for Best Actor for his roles as Jack Sparrow in Pirates of the Caribbean: The Curse of the Black Pearl (2003), J. M. Barrie in Finding Neverland (2004), and the title role in Sweeney Todd: The Demon Barber of Fleet Street (2007). His other well-received films include Public Enemies (2009), Rango (2011), Into the Woods (2014), Black Mass (2015), Murder on the Orient Express (2017) and Minamata (2020). He portrayed Gellert Grindelwald in two films within the Wizarding World's Fantastic Beasts films in 2016 and 2018.

For his work in the film industry, he received an Honorary César and star on the Hollywood Walk of Fame in 1999. He was named People's Sexiest Man Alive twice, in 2003 and in 2009. Outside acting, Depp has produced films through his company Infinitum Nihil, which he founded in 2004. He also formed the rock supergroup Hollywood Vampires with Alice Cooper and Joe Perry.

Depp was married to the actress Amber Heard from 2015 to 2017. Afterward, the pair accused each other of domestic abuse and engaged in two lengthy and high-profile defamation cases. In the English Depp v News Group Newspapers Ltd (2020), the High Court of Justice ruled that Depp engaged in domestic abuse against Heard, while in the American Depp v. Heard (2022), the Fairfax Circuit Court ruled that Heard had defamed Depp. The highly publicized case sparked widespread debate on defamation, domestic abuse, and male victims of domestic violence.

== Early life ==
Depp was born on June 9, 1963, in Owensboro, Kentucky, the youngest of four children of waitress Betty Sue Depp (née Wells; later Palmer) and civil engineer John Christopher Depp. Depp's family moved frequently during his childhood, eventually settling in Miramar, Florida, in 1970. His parents divorced in 1978 when he was 15, and his mother later married Robert Palmer, whom Depp has called "an inspiration".

Depp's mother gave him a guitar when he was 12, and he began playing in various bands. He dropped out of Miramar High School at 16 in 1979 to become a rock musician. He attempted to go back to school two weeks later, but the principal told him to follow his dream of being a musician. In 1980, Depp began playing in a band called The Kids.

After modest local success in Florida, the band moved to Los Angeles in pursuit of a record deal, changing its name to Six Gun Method. In addition to the band, Depp worked a variety of odd jobs, such as in telemarketing. In December 1983, Depp married makeup artist Lori Anne Allison, the sister of his band's bassist and singer. The Kids split up before signing a record deal in 1984, and Depp began collaborating with the band Rock City Angels. He co-wrote their song "Mary", which appeared on their debut Geffen Records album Young Man's Blues. Depp and Allison divorced in 1985.

Depp is of primarily English descent, with some French, German, Irish and distant African American ancestry. Elizabeth Key Grinstead, one of the first African Americans in the North American colonies to sue for her freedom and win, is an eighth great-grandmother. His surname comes from a French Huguenot immigrant, Pierre Dieppe, who settled in Virginia around 1700. In interviews in 2002 and 2011, Depp claimed to have Native American ancestry, "I guess I have some Native American somewhere down the line. My great-grandmother was quite a bit of Native American. She grew up Cherokee or maybe Creek Indian. Makes sense in terms of coming from Kentucky, which is rife with Cherokee and Creek Indian."

Depp's claims came under scrutiny when Indian Country Today wrote that Depp had never inquired about his heritage or been recognized as a member of the Cherokee Nation. This led to criticism of Depp from the Native American community, as Depp has no documented Native ancestry, and Native community leaders consider him "a non-Indian" and a pretendian. Depp's choice to portray Tonto, a Native American character, in The Lone Ranger was criticized, along with his choice to name his rock band "Tonto's Giant Nuts". During the promotion for The Lone Ranger, Depp was formally adopted as an honorary son by LaDonna Harris, a member of the Comanche Nation, making him an honorary member of her family but not a member of any tribe.

== Career ==
=== 1980s: Television and early film roles ===
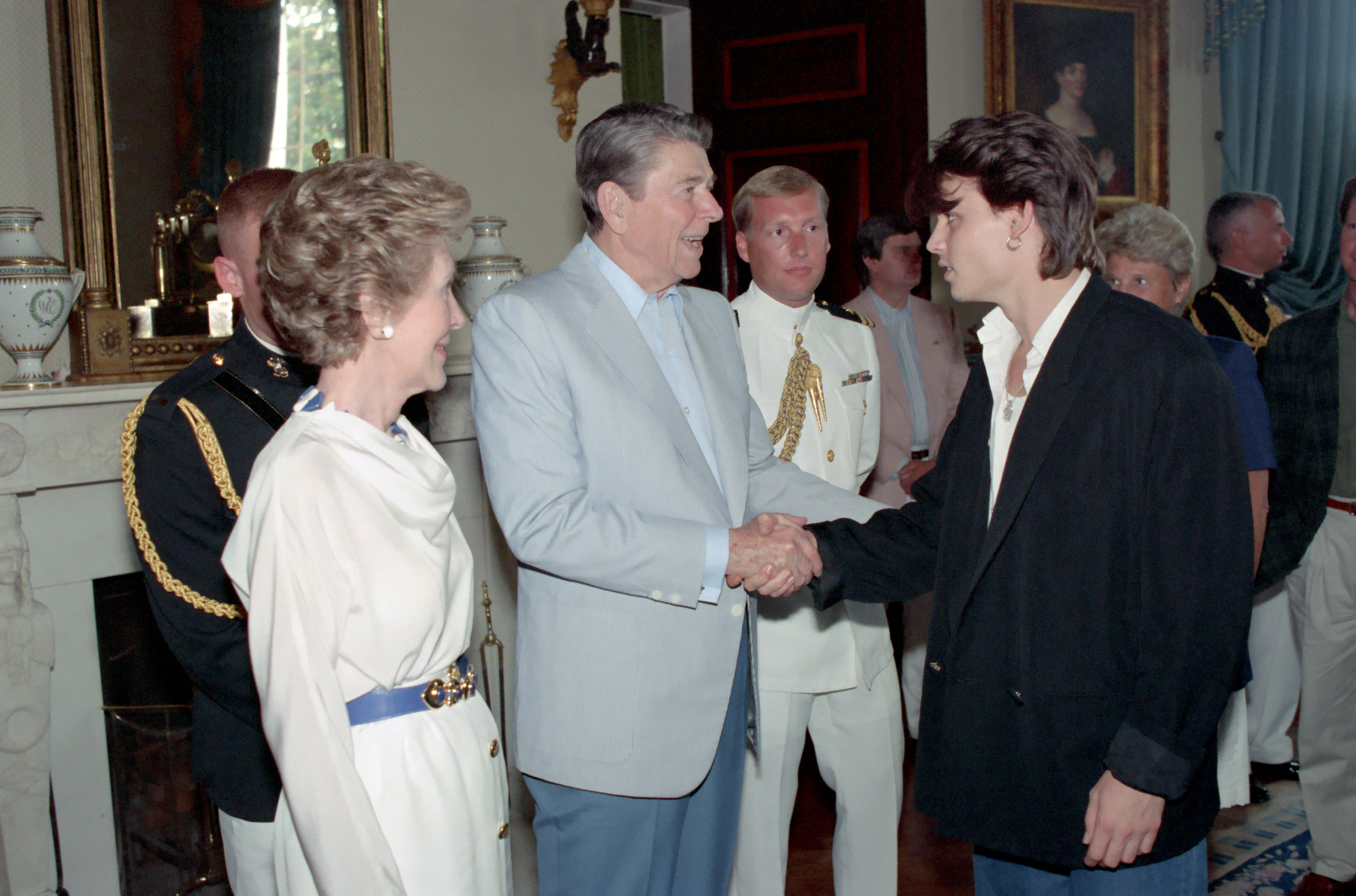
Depp greeting President Ronald Reagan at a White House benefit for the Nancy Reagan Drug Abuse Fund in 1988

Depp moved to Los Angeles with his band when he was 20. After the band broke up, Depp's then-wife Lori Ann Allison introduced him to actor Nicolas Cage. After they became drinking buddies, Cage advised him to pursue acting. Depp had been interested in acting since reading a biography of James Dean and watching Rebel Without a Cause. Cage helped Depp secure an audition with Wes Craven for A Nightmare on Elm Street; Depp, who had no acting experience, said he "ended up acting by accident". Due to Depp being noticed by Craven's daughter, he landed the role of the main character's boyfriend, one of Freddy Krueger's victims.

Although Depp said he "didn't have any desire to be an actor", he continued to be cast in films, making enough to cover some bills that his musical career left unpaid. After a starring role in the 1985 comedy Private Resort, Depp was cast in the lead role of the 1986 skating drama Thrashin' by the film's director, but its producer overrode the decision. Instead, Depp appeared in a minor supporting role as a Vietnamese-speaking private in Oliver Stone's 1986 Vietnam War drama Platoon. He became a teen idol during the late 1980s, when he starred as an undercover police officer in a high school operation in the Fox television series 21 Jump Street, which premiered in 1987. He accepted this role to work with actor Frederic Forrest, who inspired him. Despite his success, Depp felt that the series "forced [him] into the role of product".

=== 1990s: Diversification ===
Disillusioned by his experiences as a teen idol in 21 Jump Street, Depp began taking roles he found more interesting, rather than those he thought would succeed at the box office. His first film release in 1990 was John Waters's Cry-Baby, a musical comedy set in the 1950s. Although not a box-office success upon its release, over the years it has gained cult classic status. Also in 1990, Depp played the title character in Tim Burton's romantic fantasy film Edward Scissorhands opposite Dianne Wiest and Winona Ryder. The film was a commercial and critical success with a domestic gross of $53 million. In preparation for the role, Depp watched many Charlie Chaplin films to study how to create sympathy without dialogue. Peter Travers of Rolling Stone praised Depp's performance, writing that he "artfully expresses the fierce longing in gentle Edward; it's a terrific performance", while Rita Kempley of The Washington Post wrote that he "brings the eloquence of the silent era to this part of few words, saying it all through bright black eyes and the tremulous care with which he holds his horror-movie hands". Depp earned his first Golden Globe nomination for the film. Owing to this role, a species of extinct arthropod with prominent claws was named after Depp as Kootenichela deppi (chela is Latin for claws or scissors).

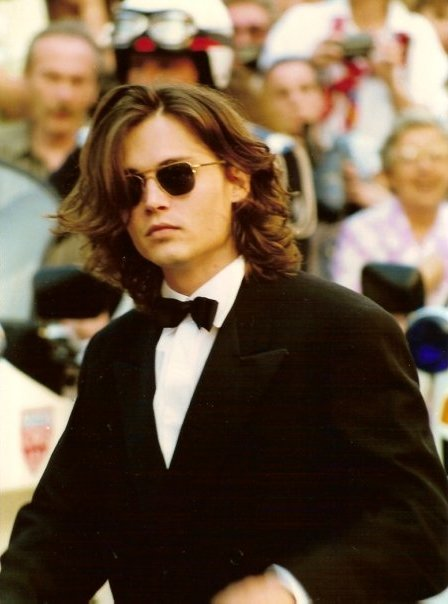
Depp at the 1992 Cannes Film Festival

Depp had no film releases in the next two years, except a brief cameo in Freddy's Dead: The Final Nightmare (1991), the sixth installment in the A Nightmare on Elm Street franchise. He appeared in three films in 1993. In the romantic comedy Benny and Joon, he played an eccentric and illiterate silent film fan who befriends a mentally ill woman and her brother; it became a sleeper hit. Janet Maslin of The New York Times wrote that Depp "may look nothing like Buster Keaton, but there are times when he genuinely seems to become the Great Stone Face, bringing Keaton's mannerisms sweetly and magically to life". Depp received a second Golden Globe nomination for the performance. His second film of 1993 was Lasse Hallström's What's Eating Gilbert Grape, a drama about a dysfunctional family co-starring Leonardo DiCaprio and Juliette Lewis. It did not perform well commercially, but received positive notices from critics. Although most of the reviews focused on DiCaprio, who was nominated for an Academy Award for his performance, Todd McCarthy of Variety wrote that "Depp manages to command center screen with a greatly affable, appealing characterization". Depp's last 1993 release was Emir Kusturica's surrealist comedy-drama Arizona Dream, which opened to positive reviews and won the Silver Bear at the Berlin Film Festival.

In 1994, Depp reunited with Burton, playing the title role in Ed Wood, a biographical film about one of history's most inept film directors. Depp later said that he was depressed about films and filmmaking at the time, but that "within 10 minutes of hearing about the project, I was committed". He found that the role gave him a "chance to stretch out and have some fun" and that working with Martin Landau, who played Bela Lugosi, "rejuvenated my love for acting". Although it did not earn back its production costs, Ed Wood received a positive reception from critics, with Maslin writing that Depp had "proved himself as an established, certified great actor" and "captured all the can-do optimism that kept Ed Wood going, thanks to an extremely funny ability to look at the silver lining of any cloud". Depp was nominated for a third time for a Best Musical or Comedy Actor Golden Globe for his performance.

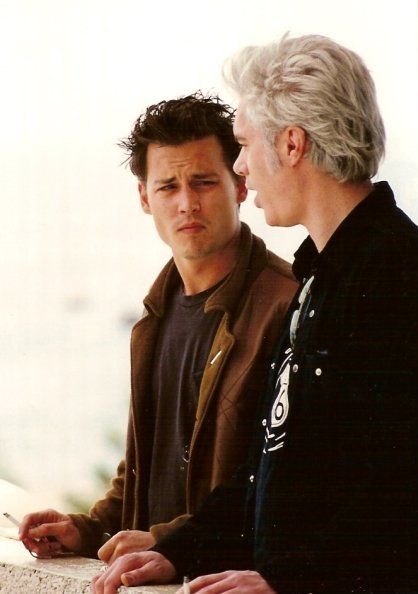
Depp with director Jim Jarmusch at the 1995 Cannes Film Festival

The next year, Depp starred in three films. He played opposite Marlon Brando in the box-office hit Don Juan DeMarco, as a man who believes he is Don Juan, the world's greatest lover. He starred in Jim Jarmusch's Dead Man, a Western shot entirely in black-and-white; it was not a commercial success and had mixed critical reviews. And in the financial and critical failure Nick of Time, Depp played an accountant who is told to kill a politician to save his kidnapped daughter.

In 1997, Depp and Al Pacino starred in the crime drama Donnie Brasco, directed by Mike Newell. Depp played Joseph D. Pistone, an undercover FBI agent who assumes the name Donnie Brasco to infiltrate the Mafia in New York City. To prepare, Depp spent time with Pistone, on whose memoirs the film was based. Donnie Brasco was a commercial and critical success, and is considered one of Depp's finest performances. Also in 1997, Depp debuted as a director and screenwriter with The Brave. He starred in it as a poor Native American man who accepts a proposal from a wealthy man, played by Marlon Brando, to appear in a snuff film in exchange for money for his family. It premiered at the 1997 Cannes Film Festival to generally negative reviews. Variety called it "a turgid and unbelievable neo-western", and Time Out wrote that "besides the implausibilities, the direction has two fatal flaws: it's both tediously slow and hugely narcissistic as the camera focuses repeatedly on Depp's bandana'd head and rippling torso". Due to the reviews, Depp did not release The Brave in the U.S.

Depp was a fan and friend of writer Hunter S. Thompson, and played his alter ego Raoul Duke in Fear and Loathing in Las Vegas (1998), Terry Gilliam's film adaptation of Thompson's pseudo-biographical novel of the same name. (Note: Depp accompanied Thompson as his road manager on one of the author's last book tours. In 2006, he contributed a foreword to Gonzo: Photographs by Hunter S. Thompson, a posthumous collection of photographs of and by Thompson, and in 2008 narrated the documentary film Gonzo: The Life and Work of Dr. Hunter S. Thompson. Following Thompson's suicide in 2005, Depp paid for most of his memorial event in his hometown of Aspen, Colorado. Following Thompson's wishes, fireworks were set off and his ashes were shot from a cannon.) It was a box-office failure and polarized critics. Later that year, Depp made a brief cameo in Mika Kaurismäki's L.A. Without a Map (1998).

Depp appeared in three films in 1999. The first was the sci-fi thriller The Astronaut's Wife, co-starring Charlize Theron, which was not a commercial or critical success. The second,The Ninth Gate, starred Depp as a seller of old books who becomes entangled in a mystery. It was moderately more successful with audiences but received mixed reviews. The third was Burton's adaptation of The Legend of Sleepy Hollow, where Depp played Ichabod Crane opposite Christina Ricci and Christopher Walken. For his performance, Depp took inspiration from Angela Lansbury, Roddy McDowall and Basil Rathbone, saying he "always thought of Ichabod as a very delicate, fragile person who was maybe a little too in touch with his feminine side, like a frightened little girl". Sleepy Hollow was a commercial and critical success.

=== 2000s: Worldwide recognition ===
Depp's first film release of the new millennium was British-French drama The Man Who Cried (2000), directed by Sally Potter and starring him as a Roma horseman opposite Christina Ricci, Cate Blanchett, and John Turturro. It was not a critical success. Depp also had a supporting role in Julian Schnabel's critically acclaimed Before Night Falls (2000). His final film of 2000 was Hallström's critically and commercially successful Chocolat, in which he played a Roma man and the love interest of the main character, Juliette Binoche. Depp's next roles were both based on historical persons. In Blow (2001), he starred as cocaine smuggler George Jung, who was part of the Medellín Cartel in the 1980s. The film underperformed at the box office and received mixed reviews. In the comic book adaptation From Hell (2001), Depp portrayed inspector Frederick Abberline, who investigated the Jack the Ripper murders in the 1880s London. The film also received mixed reviews but was a moderate commercial success.

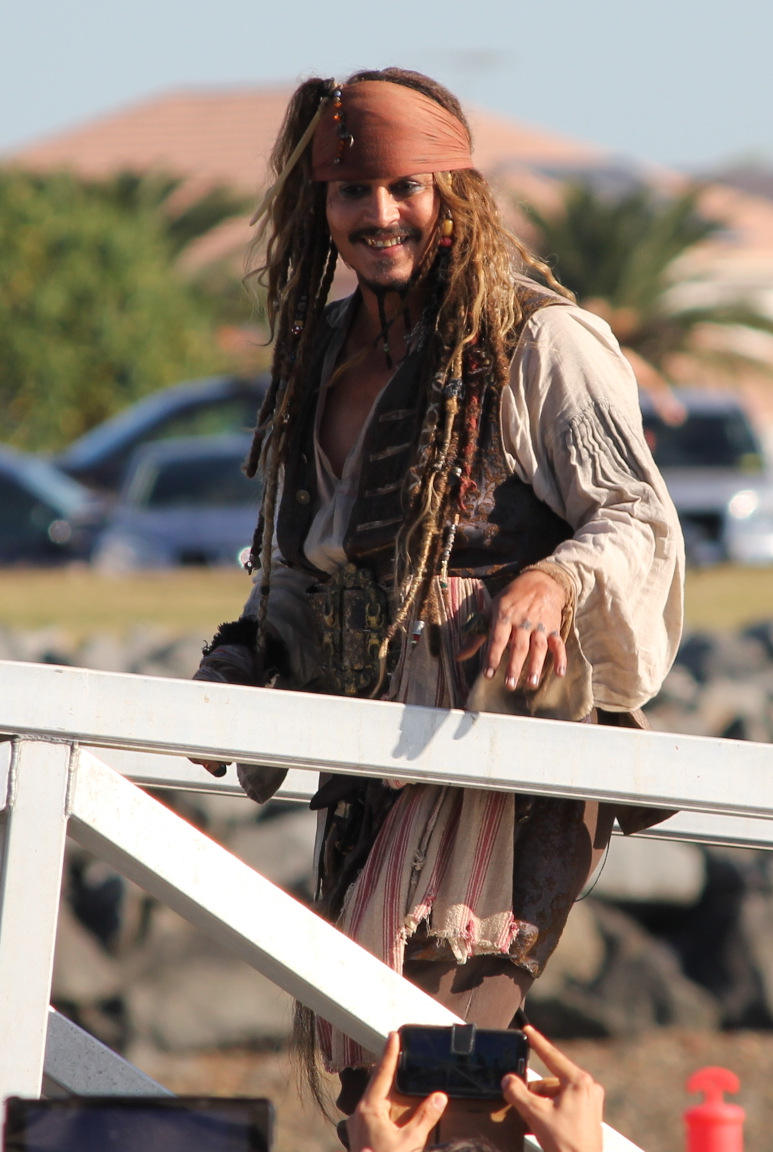
Depp in costume as Captain Jack Sparrow. He is pictured here on the set of Pirates of the Caribbean: Dead Men Tell No Tales in 2015.

In 2003, Depp starred in the Walt Disney Pictures adventure film Pirates of the Caribbean: The Curse of the Black Pearl, which was a major box office success. He earned widespread acclaim for his comic performance as pirate Captain Jack Sparrow, and received Academy Award, Golden Globe and BAFTA nominations. He won a Screen Actor's Guild Award as well as the MTV Movie Award for Best Actor in a Movie. Depp has said that Sparrow is "definitely a big part of me", and that he modeled the character after The Rolling Stones guitarist Keith Richards and cartoon skunk Pepé Le Pew. Studio executives had at first been ambivalent about Depp's portrayal, but the character became popular with audiences. In his other film release in 2003, Robert Rodriguez's action film Once Upon a Time in Mexico, Depp starred as Sheldon Sands, a corrupt and eccentric CIA agent. Depp's performance as the CIA agent recruiting El Mariachi was a central part of this final installment of Rodriguez's Mexico Trilogy. A moderate box-office success, it received average to good reviews, with Depp's performance in particular receiving praise.

Depp next starred as an author with writer's block in the thriller Secret Window (2004), based on a short story by Stephen King. It was a moderate commercial success but received mixed reviews. Released around the same time, the British-Australian independent film The Libertine (2004) saw Depp portray the seventeenth-century poet and rake, the Earl of Rochester. It had only limited release, and received mainly negative reviews. Depp's third film of 2004, Finding Neverland, was more positively received by the critics, and earned him his second Academy Award nomination as well as Golden Globe, BAFTA, and SAG nominations for his performance as Scottish author J. M. Barrie. Depp also made a brief cameo appearance in the French film Happily Ever After (2004), and founded his own film production company, Infinitum Nihil, under Warner Bros. Pictures.

Depp continued his box-office success with a starring role as eccentric candy maker Willy Wonka in Tim Burton's adaptation of Charlie and the Chocolate Factory (2005). It also had a positive critical reception, with Depp being nominated again for the Golden Globe for Best Actor - Musical or Comedy. Chocolate Factory was followed by another Burton project, the stop-motion animation Corpse Bride (2005), in which Depp voiced the main character, Victor Van Dort. Depp reprised the role of Jack Sparrow in the Pirates sequels Dead Man's Chest (2006) and At World's End (2007), both of which were major box office successes. He also voiced the character in the video game Pirates of the Caribbean: The Legend of Jack Sparrow. According to a survey taken by Fandango, Depp in the role of Jack Sparrow was the main reason for many cinema-goers to see a Pirates film.

In 2007, Depp collaborated with Burton for their sixth film together, this time playing murderous barber Sweeney Todd in the musical Sweeney Todd: The Demon Barber of Fleet Street (2007). Depp cited Peter Lorre's performance in Mad Love (1935), in which Lorre played a "creepy but sympathetic" surgeon, as his main influence for the role. Sweeney Todd was Depp's first film role that required him to sing. Rather than hiring a professional vocal coach, he prepared by recording demos with his former bandmate Bruce Witkin. The film went on to achieve both critical and commercial success. Entertainment Weekly's Chris Nashawaty stated that, "Depp's soaring voice makes you wonder what other tricks he's been hiding ... Watching Depp's barber wield his razors ... it's hard not to be reminded of Edward Scissorhands frantically shaping hedges into animal topiaries 18 years ago ... and all of the twisted beauty we would've missed out on had [Burton and Depp] never met." Depp won the Golden Globe Award for Best Actor in a Motion Picture – Musical or Comedy and received his third Oscar nomination and two Critics' Choice nominations (for Best Actor and Best Acting Ensemble).

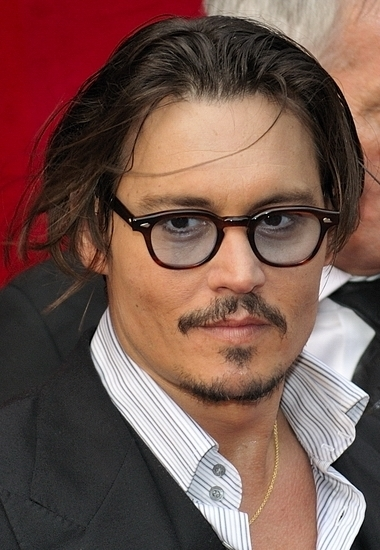
Depp at the Paris premiere of Public Enemies in 2009

In 2009, Depp portrayed real-life gangster John Dillinger in Michael Mann's 1930s crime film Public Enemies. It was commercially successful and gained moderately positive reviews. Roger Ebert stated in his review that, "This Johnny Depp performance is something else. For once an actor playing a gangster does not seem to base his performance on movies he has seen. He starts cold. He plays Dillinger as a fact." Depp's second film of 2009, The Imaginarium of Doctor Parnassus, reunited him with director Terry Gilliam. Depp, Jude Law, and Colin Farrell each played the character initially portrayed by their friend Heath Ledger, who had died before the film was completed. All three actors gave their salaries to Ledger's daughter, Matilda. The film premiered during the 62nd Cannes Film Festival out of competition and was released to generally positive reviews and mild box office success.

=== 2010s: Career fluctuations ===
Depp began the 2010s with another collaboration with Tim Burton, Alice in Wonderland (2010), in which he played the Mad Hatter opposite Helena Bonham Carter, Anne Hathaway and Alan Rickman. Despite mixed reviews, it earned US$1.025 billion in the box office, thus becoming the second-highest-grossing film of 2010 and one of the highest-grossing films of all time. Depp's second film release of 2010 was the romantic thriller The Tourist, in which he starred opposite Angelina Jolie. It was commercially successful, although panned by critics. Regardless, he received Golden Globe Award for Best Actor in a Motion Picture – Musical or Comedy nominations for both films.

Depp's first 2011 film release was the animated film Rango, in which he voiced the title character, a chameleon. It was a major critical and commercial success and went on to win the Academy Award for Best Animated Feature. His second film of the year, the fourth installment in the Pirates series, On Stranger Tides, was again a box office hit, becoming the third-highest-grossing film of 2011. Later in 2011, Depp released the first two projects co-produced by his company, Infinitum Nihil. The first was a film adaptation of the novel The Rum Diary by Hunter S. Thompson and starred Depp. It failed to bring back its production costs and received mixed reviews. The company's second undertaking, Martin Scorsese's Hugo (2011), garnered major critical acclaim and numerous awards nominations, but similarly did not perform well in the box office. In 2011, Depp also made a brief cameo in the Adam Sandler film Jack and Jill.

By 2012, Depp was one of the world's biggest film stars, and was listed by the Guinness World Records as the world's highest-paid actor, with earnings of US$75 million. That year, he and his 21 Jump Street co-stars Peter DeLuise and Holly Robinson reprised their roles in cameo appearances in the series' feature film adaptation. Depp also starred in and co-produced his eighth film with Tim Burton, the Gothic comedy horror Dark Shadows (2012), alongside Helena Bonham Carter, Michelle Pfeiffer, and Eva Green. The film was based on a 1960s Gothic television soap opera of the same name, which had been one of his favorites as a child. The film received mixed reviews and performed poorly at the United States box office but did well in foreign markets.

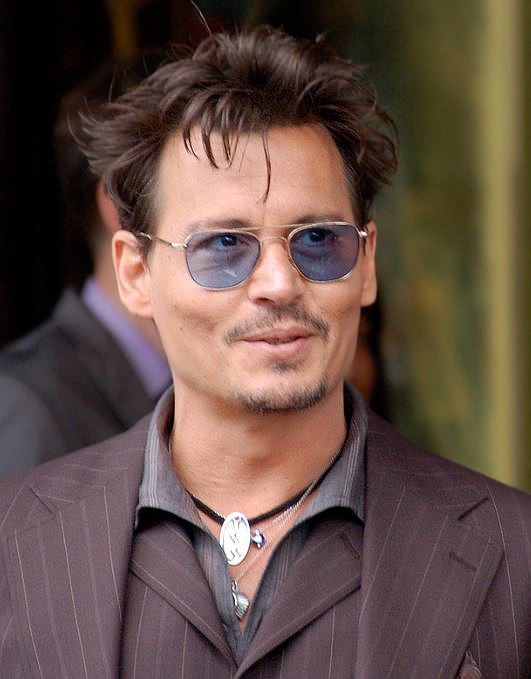
Depp at the Hollywood Walk of Fame in 2013

After Infinitum Nihil's agreement with Warner Bros expired in 2011, Depp signed a multi-year first-look deal with Walt Disney Studios. The first film made in the collaboration was The Lone Ranger (2013), in which Depp starred as Tonto. Depp's casting as a Native American brought accusations of whitewashing, and the film was not well received by the public or the critics, causing Disney to take a US$190 million loss. Following a brief cameo in the independent film Lucky Them (2013), Depp starred as an AI-studying scientist in the sci-fi thriller Transcendence (2014), which was yet another commercial failure, and earned mainly negative reviews. His other roles in 2014 were a minor supporting part as The Wolf in the film adaptation of Into the Woods, and a more substantial appearance as eccentric French-Canadian ex-detective in Kevin Smith's horror-comedy Tusk, in which he was credited by the character's name, Guy LaPointe.

In 2015, Depp appeared in two films produced by Infinitum Nihil. The first was comedy-thriller Mortdecai, in which he acted opposite Gwyneth Paltrow. The film was a critical and commercial failure. The second film, Black Mass (2015), in which he played Boston crime boss Whitey Bulger, was better received. Critics from The Hollywood Reporter and Variety called it one of Depp's best performances to date, and the role earned Depp his third nomination for the Best Actor SAG award. However, the film failed to bring back its production costs. Depp also made a cameo appearance in the critically panned London Fields, starring his then-wife Amber Heard, which was to be released in 2015, but its general release was delayed by litigation until 2018. In addition to his work in films in 2015, French luxury fashion house Dior signed Depp as the face of their men's fragrance, Sauvage, and he was inducted as a Disney Legend.

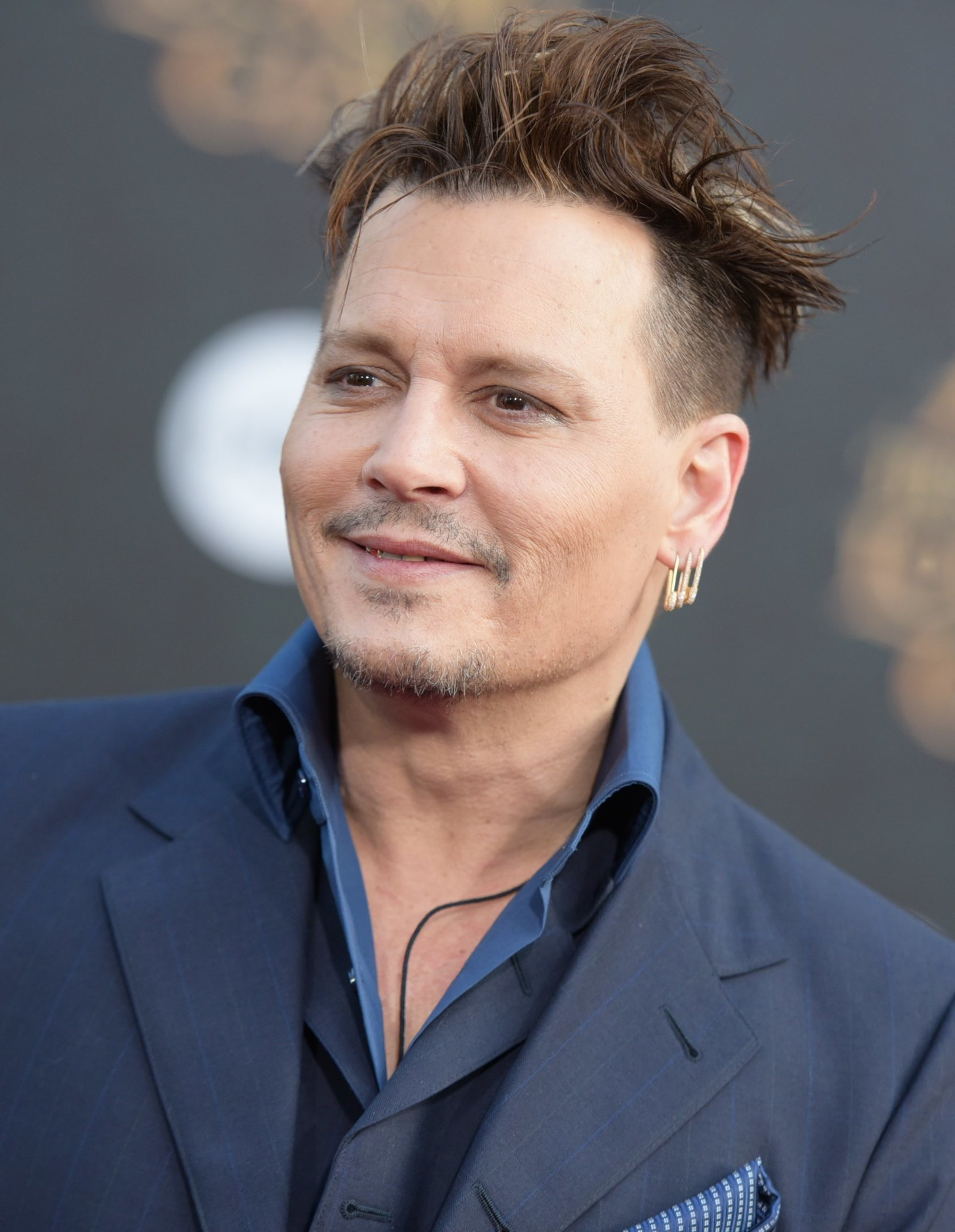
Depp at the premiere of Alice Through the Looking Glass in 2016

Depp's first film release in 2016 was Yoga Hosers, a sequel to Tusk (2014), in which Depp appeared with his daughter, Lily-Rose Depp. Next, he played businessman and presidential candidate Donald Trump in a Funny or Die satire entitled Donald Trump's The Art of the Deal: The Movie, released during the run-up to the US presidential election. He earned praise for the role, with a headline from The A.V. Club declaring, "Who knew Donald Trump was the comeback role Johnny Depp needed?". It was also announced that Depp had been cast in a new franchise role as Dr. Jack Griffin/The Invisible Man in Universal Studios's planned shared film universe entitled the Dark Universe, a rebooted version of their classic Universal Monsters franchise. One of the severed zombie heads featured in The Walking Dead season 6 episode "Not Tomorrow Yet" was based on Depp. Episode director Greg Nicotero said, "I think we had sculpted an emaciated version of a dummy head for something and we used Johnny Depp's head as a basis just for a clay sculpt." Depp reprised the role of the Mad Hatter in Tim Burton's Alice Through the Looking Glass (2016), the sequel to Alice in Wonderland. In contrast to the first film's success, the sequel lost Disney approximately US$70 million. Depp had also been secretly cast to play dark wizard Gellert Grindelwald in a cameo appearance in Fantastic Beasts and Where to Find Them (2016), the first installment of the Fantastic Beasts franchise. His name was not mentioned in the promotional materials and his cameo was only revealed at the end of the film.

In 2017, Depp appeared alongside other actors and filmmakers in The Black Ghiandola, a short film made by a terminally ill teenager through the non-profit Make a Film Foundation. He also reprised his role as Captain Jack Sparrow in the fifth installment of the Pirates series, Dead Men Tell No Tales (2017). In the US, it did not perform as well as previous installments. However, the film had a good box office return internationally, especially in China, Japan and Russia. Depp's last film release in 2017 was the Agatha Christie adaptation Murder on the Orient Express, in which he was part of an ensemble cast led by director-star Kenneth Branagh. He portrayed Edward Ratchett. The film received mixed reviews and box office success.

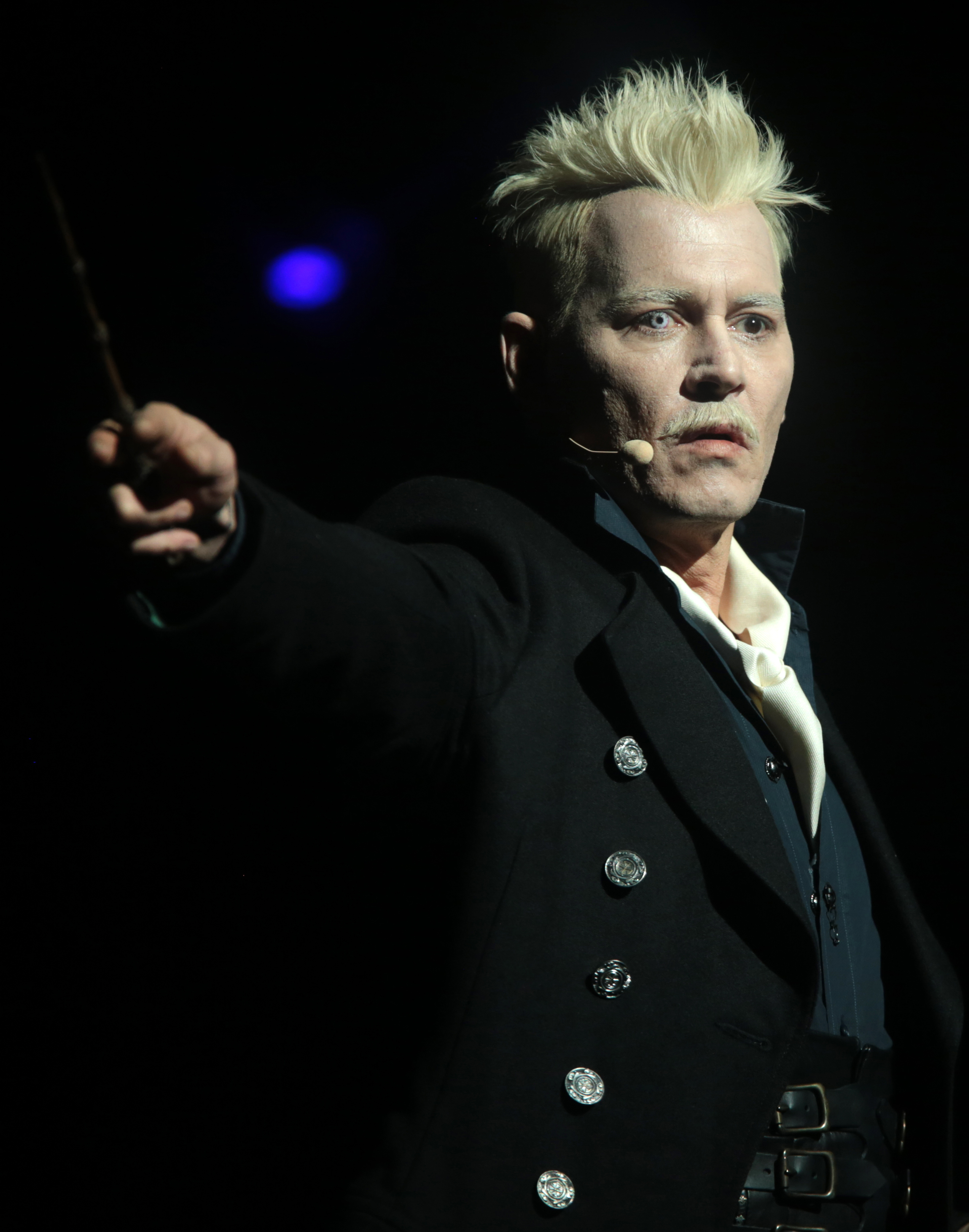
Depp in costume as Gellert Grindelwald at San Diego Comic-Con in 2018

In 2018, Depp voiced the title character Sherlock Gnomes in the animated movie Gnomeo & Juliet: Sherlock Gnomes. Although moderately commercially successful, it was critically panned. Depp then starred in two independent films, both produced by him and his company, Infinitum Nihil. The first was City of Lies, in which he starred as Russell Poole, an LAPD detective who attempts to solve the murders of rappers Tupac Shakur and The Notorious B.I.G. It was set for release in September 2018, but was pulled from the release schedule after a crew member sued Depp for assault. The second film was the comedy-drama Richard Says Goodbye, in which Depp played a professor with terminal cancer. It premiered at the Zurich Film Festival in October 2018. Depp's last film release of 2018 was Fantastic Beasts: The Crimes of Grindelwald, in which he reprised his role as Grindelwald. Depp's casting received criticism from fans of the series due to the domestic violence allegations against him.

Depp also experienced other career setbacks around this time, as Disney confirmed that they would not be casting him in new Pirates installments and he was reported to no longer be attached to Universal's Dark Universe franchise. Depp's next films was the independent drama Waiting for the Barbarians (2019), which premiered at the 76th Venice International Film Festival and is based on a novel by J. M. Coetzee.

=== 2020s: Personal struggles and resurgence ===
In Minamata (2020), Depp portrayed photographer W. Eugene Smith. The film premiered at the 2020 Berlin International Film Festival. In November 2020, Depp resigned from his role as Grindelwald in the Fantastic Beasts franchise at the request of its production company, Warner Bros., after he lost his UK libel case against The Sun, which had accused him of being a domestic abuser. He was replaced by Mads Mikkelsen.

In March 2021, City of Lies, which was originally scheduled for 2018, was released in theaters and streaming services. The same month, an online petition to bring Depp back to the Pirates franchise, begun four months earlier, reached its goal of 500,000 signatures. His Pirates co-star Kevin McNally also expressed support for Depp returning to the role. In July 2021, Andrew Levitas, the director of Minamata (2020), accused MGM of trying to bury the film due to Depp's involvement, with Depp claiming he is being boycotted by the Hollywood industry and calling his changed reputation an "absurdity of media mathematics". Minamata was released in the UK and Ireland in August 2021, and in North America in December 2021. The film received positive reviews, with multiple publications praising Depp's performance as his best in years. Depp also continues as the face of Dior's men's fragrance, Sauvage.

Depp received multiple honorary awards at numerous European film festivals, including at the Camerimage festival in Poland, the Karlovy Vary International Film Festival in the Czech Republic, and the San Sebastián International Film Festival in Spain, where Depp was awarded the Donostia Award. These awards were controversial, with various domestic violence charities criticizing the festivals. The organizers of the ceremonies released statements defending their decision to award Depp, with the San Sebastian Film Festival stating that "he has not been charged by any authority in any jurisdiction, nor convicted of any form of violence against women".

In September 2021, Depp described himself as a victim of cancel culture. The same month, he launched IN.2, a London-based sister company to his production company, Infinitum Nihil, and announced that IN.2 and the Spanish production company A Contracorriente Films were starting a new development fund for TV and film projects.

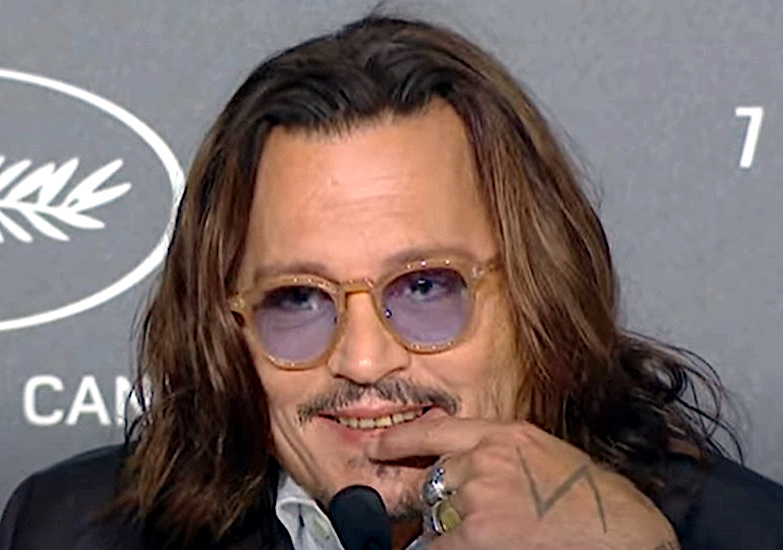
Depp at the 2023 Cannes Film Festival

On February 15, 2022, Depp received the Serbian Gold Medal of Merit from President Aleksandar Vučić for "outstanding merits in public and cultural activities, especially in the field of film art and the promotion of the Republic of Serbia in the world". Minamata and animated series Puffins were shot in the country.

On May 29, 2022, Depp, who was still awaiting a verdict in his highly publicized defamation trial against ex-wife Amber Heard, made a surprise appearance at a Jeff Beck gig in Sheffield, playing guitar alongside Beck to three classic songs from John Lennon, Marvin Gaye and Jimi Hendrix. Depp joined Beck on his last concert tour to promote the Depp-Beck album 18. In August 2022, Depp made a cameo appearance at the 2022 MTV Video Music Awards.

Depp next starred as King Louis XV in French actor-director Maïwenn's period film Jeanne Du Barry (2023). This was the first film for Depp where he acted in French. The film premiered at the 2023 Cannes Film Festival as the opening film, where it was greeted with a 7-minute standing ovation and received a mixed reception from film critics. Many critics deemed it Depp's comeback role, something he did not agree with.

Modì, Three Days on the Wing of Madness (2024), was Depp's first directorial effort in over 25 years. The film is about 72 hours in the life of Italian artist Amedeo Modigliani, and Depp co-produced it through his European company IN.2 Film, alongside Al Pacino. It stars Riccardo Scamarcio, Stephen Graham, Al Pacino and Antonia Desplat, and it is based on a play by Dennis McIntyre. Principal photography commenced in September 2023 in Budapest, Hungary and was completed in Los Angeles and Turin in early 2024. The film premiered at the 72nd San Sebastián International Film Festival on September 24, 2024, where it was received warmly by the audience with a lengthy standing ovation.

Depp in costume as Ebenezer Scrooge at the 2026 San Diego Comic-Con

Depp next starred as Ebenezer Scrooge in Ti West's Ebenezer, which was released on November 13, 2026, by Paramount Pictures, and marked his first major studio film since Fantastic Beasts: The Crimes of Grindelwald. He starred alongside Andrea Riseborough, Tramell Tillman, Ian McKellen, Rupert Grint, and Daisy Ridley. His next film is Marc Webb's action thriller film Day Drinker alongside his On Stranger Tides co-star Penélope Cruz. Also in 2025, Depp spoke with Jerry Bruckheimer about a possible return to the Pirates of the Caribbean in the sixth film of the franchise, pending script development. Bruckheimer eventually confirmed in August 2026 that Depp was indeed in talks with Disney to return for a sixth installment, albeit in a supporting role.

== Other ventures ==
In 2004, Depp founded film production company Infinitum Nihil to develop projects where he will serve as actor or producer. He serves as its CEO, while his sister, Christi Dembrowski, serves as president. The company's first two film releases were The Rum Diary (2011) and Hugo (2011). A European sister-company to Infinitum Nihil, entitled IN.2, was launched in September 2021. In a press release, Depp stated: "From the student to the maestro, from the aspiring artists to the yet-knowns, to the well-established great masters across all forms of modern media, IN.2 will build a space where artists can be artists, where they will be free to create those unexpected moments, those happy accidents that contain the propensity to constitute great art and so bring their unique vision to life."

Depp co-owned the nightclub The Viper Room in Los Angeles from 1993 to 2003, and he was also part owner of the restaurant-bar Man Ray in Paris for a short period of time. Depp and Douglas Brinkley edited folk singer Woody Guthrie's novel House of Earth, which was published in 2013.

=== Music ===
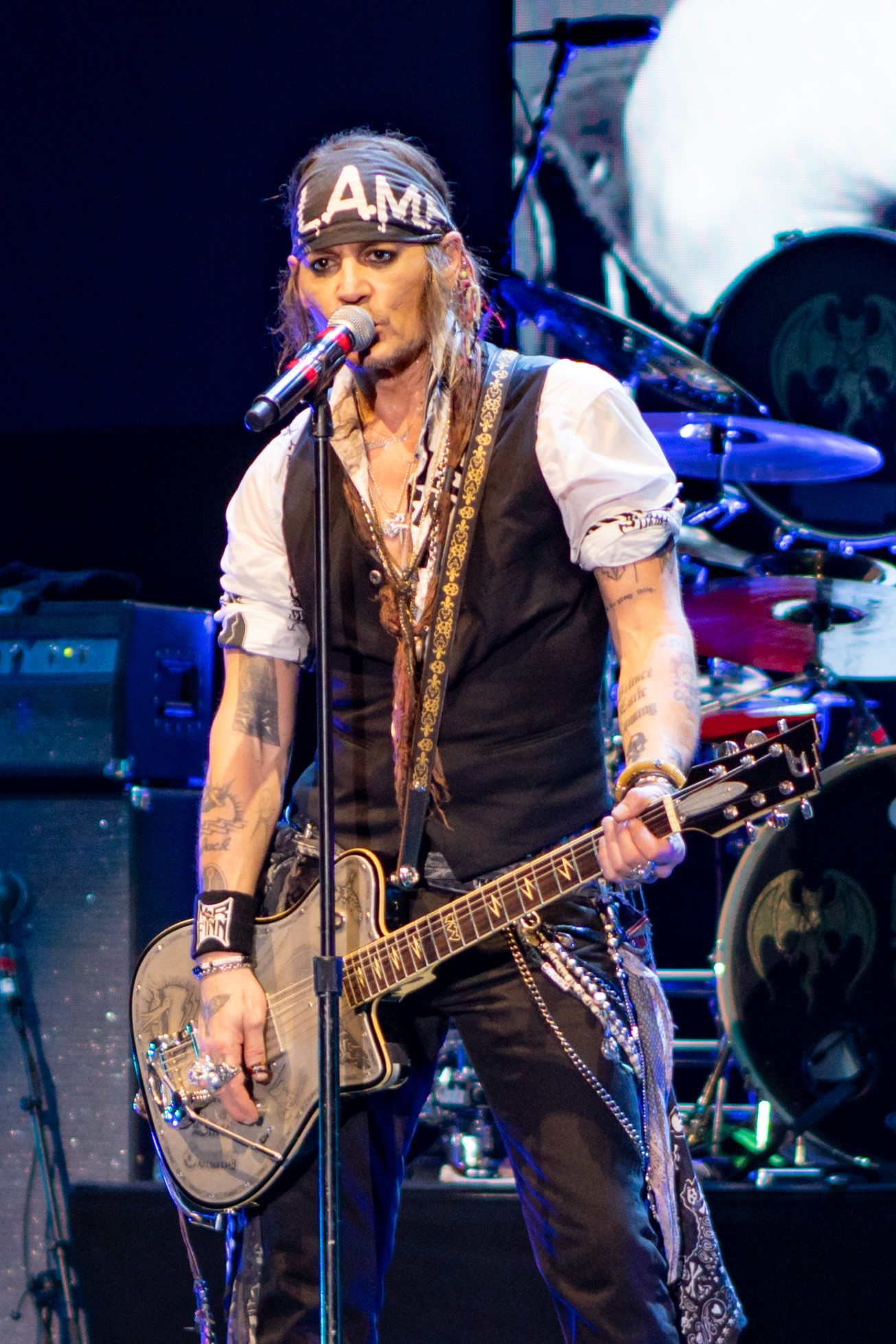
Depp performing with the Hollywood Vampires at Wembley Arena in 2018

Prior to his acting career, Depp was a guitarist, and has later featured on songs by Oasis, Shane MacGowan, Iggy Pop, Vanessa Paradis, Aerosmith, Marilyn Manson, and The New Basement Tapes, among others. He also performed with Manson at the Revolver Golden Gods Awards in 2012. Depp played guitar on the soundtrack of his films Chocolat and Once Upon a Time in Mexico, and has appeared in music videos for Tom Petty and the Heartbreakers, The Lemonheads, Avril Lavigne and Paul McCartney. In the 1990s, he was also a member of P, a musical group featuring Butthole Surfers singer Gibby Haynes, Red Hot Chili Peppers bassist Flea and Sex Pistols guitarist Steve Jones.

In 2014, Depp joined Aerosmith on stage at the Xfinity Center in Mansfield, Massachusetts.

In 2015, Depp formed the supergroup Hollywood Vampires with Alice Cooper and Joe Perry; the band also includes Bruce Witkin, his friend from his 1980s band, The Kids. Hollywood Vampires released their self-titled debut studio album in September 2015. It featured eleven classic rock covers, as well as three original songs (all co-written by Depp). The band made their live debut at The Roxy in Los Angeles in September 2015, and has since done three world tours in 2016, 2018 and 2023. Their second studio album, Rise, was released in June 2019 and consists mostly of original material, including songs written by Depp. The album also features a cover version of David Bowie's "Heroes", sung by Depp.

In 2020, Depp released a cover of John Lennon's "Isolation" with guitarist Jeff Beck, and stated that they would be releasing more music together in the future. Beginning in May 2022, Depp joined Beck onstage for a number of concerts in the United Kingdom, where Beck announced they had recorded an album together. Their joint record, titled 18, was released on July 15, 2022. Depp also accompanied Beck on his last European and American tours, which began in June and ended in November. In May 2023, Depp performed at the Jeff Beck tribute concerts held at the Royal Albert Hall in London, sharing the stage with Eric Clapton, Rod Stewart, Ronnie Wood and Kirk Hammett among others.

On July 17, 2024, Depp was a special guest at one of the three Andrea Bocelli 30th anniversary concerts. Together, Depp and Bocelli performed the song "En Aranjuez Con Tu Amor" in honor of Jeff Beck. Depp played the guitar, while Bocelli sang. Other guests included Will Smith, Ed Sheeran, Russell Crowe, Brian May, Jon Batiste and Laura Pausini.

=== Art ===
In July 2022, artwork made by Depp sold out less than a day since it debuted in the art retailer Castle Fine Art in London's Covent Garden. The art house hosted his "Friends & Heroes" collection, which was described as paintings of people "who have inspired him as a person". Among the art pieces, the names include actors Al Pacino and Elizabeth Taylor and musicians Bob Dylan and Keith Richards. Depp made nearly $4 million and sold 780 prints through the art house's 37 galleries. Ahead of the sale, Depp expressed his desire to display his art publicly and stated, "I've always used art to express my feelings and to reflect on those who matter most to me, like my family, friends and people I admire." He added, "My paintings surround my life, but I kept them to myself and limited myself. No one should ever limit themselves." All 780 pieces sold within hours, with framed individual images going for £3,950 and the complete portfolio of four images selling for £14,950. "This world-first release proved to be our fastest-selling collection to date, with all titles selling out in just hours", the gallery announced on Instagram. Speaking on behalf of fine art publishers, Washington Green Glyn Washington described Depp as a "true creative, with an extraordinary eye for detail and nuance".

A second installment in the "Friends & Heroes" collection, this time entitled "Friends & Heroes II" was released in March 2023. Prints of public figures Heath Ledger, Bob Marley, River Phoenix and Hunter S. Thompson were made available for sale, as a four-piece, and signed by Depp, or sold individually. In July 2023, Depp unveiled an auto portrait, entitled "Five" which he had painted in 2021. The meaning of the number five is, according to Depp, linked the fact that he was about to enter the fifth year of a dark phase in his life. Depp spoke about the difficulty in creating a self-portrait, stating: "It's not the most comfortable thing doing a self-portrait. Although, in a weird way, almost everything you do is a self-portrait in one way or another." The collections were once again hosted by Castle Fine Art gallery.

Depp opened his first art exhibition A Bunch of Stuff on October 4, 2024, at the Starrett–Lehigh Building in New York City. The exhibition features artworks created by Depp over many decades, with some dating back to his 20s. On September 30, 2024, a special preview event took place, with Depp and some of his friends and family members present, including Jim Jarmusch, Jerry Bruckheimer and Justin Bartha.

== Philanthropy ==
Depp has a history of supporting various charitable causes. In 2006, Depp received the "Courage to Care" award from Children's Hospital Los Angeles for his advocacy for children and children's charities. In 2016, he received the "Rhonda's Kiss Healing and Hope Award" at the Rhonda's Kiss annual benefit concert. The award recognized his work with cancer patients and his contributions to research.

Depp donated nearly $800,000 to several charities through the sale of his "Never Fear Truth" NFTs. The donations were made to children's hospitals and other organizations, including the Children's Hospital of Los Angeles, Perth Children's Hospital Foundation, Great Ormond Street Hospital Children's Charity, and The Footprint Coalition. He also donated the $1 million settlement he received from Amber Heard to five charities: Make-A-Film Foundation, The Painted Turtle, Tetiaroa Society, Red Feather, and Amazonia Fund Alliance.

Depp and Rod Stewart collaborated on a private benefit concert to raise money for Celia Hammond's Animal Trust. The event, which took place in London, aimed to support the charity's efforts in rescuing and caring for cats and kittens. The concert successfully raised over $300,000. Depp donated an original, signed piece of artwork to The Bright Foundation, a UK-based children's arts education charity, for auction. The auction, managed by Kerry Taylor Auctions, included the artwork and three of Depp's costumes. The proceeds will help the arts education charity to provide access to creative activities for children and young people facing disadvantage in the UK.

Depp has visited hospitals' children's wards as Jack Sparrow around the world, from Vancouver, Paris, London, Australia and U.S. His most recent visits were in Spain. He also recorded a video message as the character to a terminally ill boy. Depp made a voice message as himself for a girl who had been in a coma for five months; parents of the girl asked him to tape a message because he was the favorite actor of their daughter and they hoped playing the message would help wake her up.

== Public image and reception ==
In the 1990s, Depp was seen as a new type of sex symbol that rejected the norms of that term. After becoming a teen idol in 21 Jump Street, he publicly protested against the image, and with his subsequent film and public relations choices began to cultivate a new public persona. The Sydney Morning Herald characterized Depp in the 1990s as the "bad boy of Hollywood"; Depp's chain smoking, recreational drug use and drinking habits were generally documented during this time. According to The Guardian journalist Hadley Freeman in 2020:

Along with Phoenix and Keanu Reeves, he was part of a holy trinity of grunge heart-throbs. They were the opposite of the Beverly Hills, 90210 boys, or Brad Pitt and DiCaprio, because they seemed embarrassed by their looks, even resentful of them. ...This uninterest in their own prettiness made them seem edgy, even while their prettiness softened that edge. They signified not just a different kind of celebrity, but a different kind of masculinity: desirable but gentle, manly but girlish. Depp in particular was the cool pinup it was safe to like, and the safe pinup it was cool to like. We fans understood that there was more to Depp, Phoenix and Reeves than handsomeness. They were artistic—they had bands!—and they thought really big thoughts, which they would ramble on about confusingly in interviews. If we dated them, we understood that our role would be to understand their souls.

Similarly, film scholar Anne Everett has described Depp's 1990s films and public persona as "anti-macho" and "gender-bending", going against the conventions of a Hollywood leading man. After 21 Jump Street, Depp chose to work in independent films, often taking on quirky roles that sometimes even completely obscured his looks, such as Edward Scissorhands. Critics often described Depp's characters as "iconic loners" or "gentle outsiders". According to Depp, his onetime agent, Tracey Jacobs of United Talent Agency (UTA), had to take "a lot of heat over the years" for his role choices; Depp characterized higher-ups at UTA as thinking, "Jesus Christ! When does he do a movie where he kisses the girl? When does he get to pull a gun out and shoot somebody? When does he get to be a man for a change? When is he finally going to do a blockbuster?". According to Everett, his "rule-breaking" roles matched with the "much publicized rebelliousness, unconventionality, and volatility ascribed to Depp's own personal life throughout the decade. From reports of his repeated confrontations with the police, trashing of a hotel room, chain smoking, drinking, and drug use, to his multiple engagements to such glamorous women as supermodel Kate Moss and Hollywood starlet Winona Ryder and others, we clearly see a perfect fit between his non-conformist star image and his repertoire of outsider characters". Indian actor Dino Morea hailed Depp as a creative muse, crediting the iconic actor's fearless character portrayals as a guiding influence on his own artistic journey. He also stated that Depp's fearless commitment to complex characters encouraged him to explore bolder, more challenging roles in his own career.

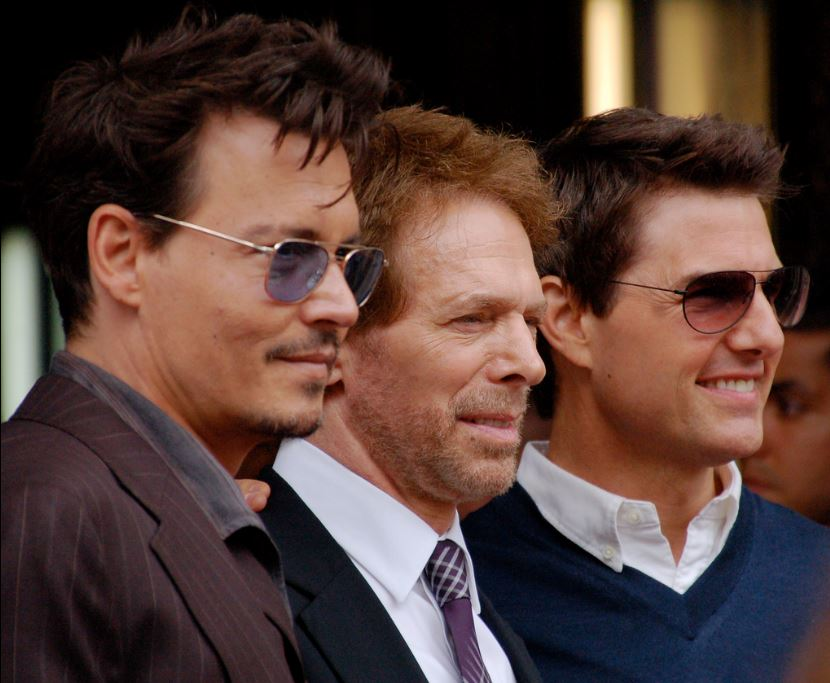
Depp with producer Jerry Bruckheimer (center) and actor Tom Cruise (right) in 2013

After a decade of appearing mainly in independent films with varying commercial success, Depp became one of the biggest box-office draws in the 2000s with his role as Captain Jack Sparrow in Walt Disney Studios' Pirates of the Caribbean franchise. The five films in the series have earned US$4.5 billion as of 2021. In addition to the Pirates franchise, Depp also made four further films with Tim Burton that were major successes, with one, Alice in Wonderland (2010), becoming the biggest commercial hit of Depp's career and one of the highest-grossing films in history (as of 2021). In 2012, Depp was one of the world's biggest film stars, and was listed by the Guinness World Records as the world's highest-paid actor, with earnings of US$75 million in a year.

According to film scholar Murray Pomerance, Depp's collaboration with Disney "can be seen to purport and herald a new era for Johnny Depp, one in which he is, finally, as though long-promised and long-expected, the proud proprietor of a much-accepted career; not only a star but a middle-class hero". In 2003, the same year as the first film in the Pirates series was released, Depp was named "World's Sexiest Man" by People; he would receive the title again in 2009. During the decade and into the 2010s, Depp was one of the biggest and most popular film stars in the world and was named by public vote as "Favorite Male Movie Star" at the People's Choice Awards every year for 2005 through 2012. In 2012, Depp became the highest-paid actor in the American film industry, earning as high as $75 million per film, and as of 2020, is the tenth highest-grossing actor worldwide, with his films having grossed over US$3.7 billion at the United States box office and over US$10 billion worldwide. Although a mainstream favorite with the audiences, critics' views on Depp changed in the 2000s, becoming more negative as he was seen to conform more to the Hollywood ideal. Regardless, Depp continued to eschew more traditional leading-man roles until towards the end of the 2000s, when he starred as John Dillinger in Public Enemies (2009).

In the 2010s, Depp's films were less successful, with many big-budget studio films such as Dark Shadows (2012), The Lone Ranger (2013), and Alice Through the Looking Glass (2016) underperforming at the box office. Depp also received negative publicity due to allegations of domestic violence, substance abuse, poor on-set behavior and the loss of his US$650 million fortune. After losing a highly publicized libel trial against the publishers of The Sun, Depp was asked to resign from Warner Bros.' Fantastic Beasts franchise. Many publications alleged that Depp would struggle to find further work in major studio productions in the future.

== Personal life ==
Depp owns a property in West Hollywood and currently lives in London. By February 2023, he had not yet bought a property there, instead choosing to either stay at hotels or at friends' houses.

=== Relationships ===
Depp married Lori Anne Allison on December 24, 1983, in Miami-Dade County, Florida. She was the sister of his rock band's bassist. The couple moved to Los Angeles County, California to pursue careers in music; Depp found some success with his group The Kids, opening for the Ramones and Iggy Pop, but Allison's career as a record producer was halted after she became deaf in one ear, prompting her to pursue a career as a makeup artist for film and television. Through her connections, Allison was able to introduce Depp to Nicolas Cage. Cage was impressed by Depp and arranged for him to audition for A Nightmare on Elm Street, which became his first film credit. After two years of marriage, their divorce finalized on March 7, 1986. Depp and Allison remained friendly over the years, with her still using Depp as her professional surname and voicing sympathy for him during his defamation trial against his second wife Amber Heard.

In the late 1980s, he was engaged to actresses Jennifer Grey and Sherilyn Fenn. In 1990, he proposed to his Edward Scissorhands co-star Winona Ryder, whom he had begun dating the year prior. They ended their relationship in 1993; Depp later had the "Winona Forever" tattoo on his right arm changed to "Wino Forever". Between 1994 and 1998, he was in a relationship with English model Kate Moss. Following his breakup with Moss, Depp began a relationship with French actress and singer Vanessa Paradis, whom he met while filming The Ninth Gate in France in 1998. They have two children, daughter Lily-Rose Melody Depp (born 1999) and a son (born 2002). Depp stated that having children has given him a "real foundation, a real strong place to stand in life, in work, in everything ...You cannot plan the kind of deep love that results in children. Fatherhood was not a conscious decision. It was part of the wonderful ride I was on. It was destiny. All the math finally worked." In June 2012, Depp and Paradis announced their separation.

Following the end of his relationship with Vanessa Paradis, Depp began dating actress Amber Heard, with whom he had co-starred in The Rum Diary (2011). Depp and Heard were married in a civil ceremony on February 3, 2015. Heard filed for divorce on May 23, 2016, and obtained a temporary restraining order against Depp, alleging in her court declaration that he had been verbally and physically abusive throughout their relationship, usually while under the influence of drugs or alcohol. Depp denied these claims and alleged that she was "attempting to secure a premature financial resolution". A settlement was reached in August 2016, and the divorce was finalized in January 2017. Heard dismissed the restraining order, and they issued a joint statement saying that their "relationship was intensely passionate and at times volatile, but always bound by love. Neither party has made false accusations for financial gain. There was never any intent of physical or emotional harm". Depp paid Heard a divorce settlement of US$7 million, which she pledged to donate to the ACLU and the Children's Hospital Los Angeles (CHLA).

=== Legal issues and allegations ===
==== Heard related litigations ====
Depp v News Group Newspapers Ltd

In 2018, Depp brought a libel lawsuit in the UK against News Group Newspapers (NGN), publishers of The Sun, over an April 2018 article titled "GONE POTTY How Can J K Rowling be "genuinely happy" casting wife beater Johnny Depp in the new Fantastic Beasts film?". The case had a highly publicized trial in July 2020, with both Depp and Heard testifying for several days. Depp's lawyer, David Sherborne, said that Heard had lied in her evidence, while NGN's lawyer Sasha Wass said that "all the evidence in [the] case and all the supporting evidence of the incidents of violence" leave "no doubt that Mr. Depp regularly and systematically abused his wife".

In November 2020, the High Court of Justice ruled that 12 of the 14 incidents of physical violence alleged by NGN occurred and that in three of them, Depp had put Heard "in fear of her life". The court rejected Depp's claim of a hoax as well as his characterization of Heard as a "gold-digger". The court also found that the characterization of Depp as a "wife beater" by The Sun was "substantially true". Following the verdict, Depp resigned from the Fantastic Beasts franchise after being asked to do so by its production company, Warner Bros.

Depp appealed the verdict, with his lawyers accusing Heard of not following through on a pledge to donate her divorce settlement to charity, contrary to her testimony. Depp's lawyers also asserted that Heard's donation testimony had significantly influenced the judge's view of Heard. Heard's legal team stated that she had not yet finished paying her pledged donation due to the financial burden of the lawsuits against her by Depp and that Depp was using this to "divert attention from the UK Court's findings relating to allegations of Mr. Depp committing domestic abuse and violence". Depp's appeal to overturn the verdict was rejected by the England and Wales Court of Appeal in March 2021.

Depp v. Heard

In February 2019, Depp sued Heard for defamation over a December 2018 op-ed for The Washington Post. The lawsuit ultimately resulted in Depp alleging that the op-ed contained three defamatory statements: first, its headline, "Amber Heard: I spoke up against sexual violence — and faced our culture's wrath. That has to change"; second, Heard's writing: "Then two years ago, I became a public figure representing domestic abuse, and I felt the full force of our culture's wrath for women who speak out"; and third, Heard's writing: "I had the rare vantage point of seeing, in real time, how institutions protect men accused of abuse." Depp alleged that he had been the one who was abused by Heard, that her allegations constituted a hoax against him, and that as a consequence, Disney had declined to cast him in future projects.

Heard countersued Depp in August 2020, alleging that he had coordinated "a harassment campaign via Twitter and [by] orchestrating online petitions in an effort to get her fired from Aquaman and L'Oreal". Ultimately, Heard's counter-suit went to trial over three allegations that Depp had defamed her through statements made by his then-lawyer, Adam Waldman, published in the Daily Mail in April 2020: first, Waldman stated that "Heard and her friends in the media used fake sexual violence allegations as both sword and shield", publicizing a "sexual violence hoax" against Depp; second, Waldman stated that in one incident at a penthouse, "Amber and her friends spilled a little wine and roughed the place up, got their stories straight under the direction of a lawyer and publicist, and then placed a second call to 911" as a "hoax" against Depp; third, Waldman stated that there had been an "abuse hoax" by Heard against Depp.

In October 2020, the judge in the case dismissed Depp's lawyer Adam Waldman after he leaked confidential information covered by a protective order to the media. Following the verdict in Depp's lawsuit against The Sun the next month, Heard's lawyers filed to have the defamation suit dismissed, but Judge Penny Azcarate ruled against it because Heard had not been a party in the UK case. In August 2021, a New York judge ruled that the ACLU must disclose documents related to Heard's charity pledge to the organization.

The Depp v. Heard trial took place in Fairfax County, Virginia from April 11 to June 1, 2022. During the trial, Heard accused Depp of domestic abuse, stating that Depp "plunged into the depths of paranoia and violence after binging on drugs and alcohol" during their relationship. On the other hand, Depp accused Heard of several instances of physical and verbal abuse during their relationship.

On June 1, 2022, the jury returned a verdict after 13 hours of deliberation. In their verdict, the jury found that all three statements from Heard's op-ed were false, defamed Depp, and were made with actual malice. The jury awarded Depp $10 million in compensatory damages and $5 million in punitive damages, although the punitive damages were reduced to $350,000 due to a limit imposed by a Virginia state law. For Heard's countersuit, the jury found that Waldman's first and third statements to the Daily Mail were not defamatory, but that Waldman's second statement to the Daily Mail was false, defamatory, and made with actual malice. As a result, Heard was awarded $2 million in compensatory damages and zero in punitive damages from Depp.

Depp reacted to the result of the trial by declaring that the "jury gave [him his] life back." Depp also stated that he was "overwhelmed by the outpouring of love and the colossal support and kindness from around the world". He continued: "I hope that my quest to have the truth be told will have helped others, men or women, who have found themselves in my situation".

Heard and Depp settled the case in December 2022, with Heard maintaining that the settlement was "not an act of concession". Meanwhile, Depp's lawyers stated that the "jury's unanimous decision and the resulting judgement in Mr. Depp's favor against Ms. Heard remain fully in place", and that the settlement would result in $1 million being paid to Depp, which he was pledging to donate to charity.

==== Other legal issues and allegations ====
Depp was arrested in Vancouver in 1989 for assaulting a security guard after the police were called to end a loud party at his hotel room. He was arrested in New York City in 1994 after causing damage to his room at The Mark Hotel, where he was staying with his girlfriend Kate Moss. The charges were dropped against him after he agreed to pay $9,767 in damages.

Depp was arrested in 1999 for brawling with photographers after they tried to take his picture. He allegedly threatened them with a wooden plank when they approached him outside Mirabelle restaurant in central London.

In 2012, UC Irvine medical professor Robin Eckert sued Depp and three security firms, Premier Group International, Damian Executive Production Inc. and Staff Pro Inc., claiming to have been roughed up by Depp's bodyguards at a concert in Los Angeles in 2011. During the incident, she was allegedly hand-cuffed and dragged 40 feet across the floor, resulting in injuries including a dislocated elbow. Depp's attorneys contended that Eckert provoked the alleged assault and therefore "consented to any assault and battery". Eckert's court papers stated that Depp, despite being his security guards' direct manager, did nothing to stop the attack. Before the case went to trial, Depp settled with Eckert for an undisclosed sum, according to TMZ.

In April 2015, Depp and his then-wife Amber Heard breached Australia's biosecurity laws when they failed to declare their two dogs to the customs when they flew to Queensland, where he was working on a film. Heard pleaded guilty to falsifying quarantine documents, stating that she had made a mistake due to sleep deprivation. She was placed on a $1,000 one-month good behavior bond for producing a false document; Heard and Depp also released a video in which they apologized for their behavior and urged people to adhere to the biosecurity laws. The Guardian called the case the "highest profile criminal quarantine case" in Australian history.

In March 2016, Depp cut ties with his management company, The Management Group (TMG), and sued them in January 2017 for alleged embezzlement and for allegedly improperly managing his money and leaving him over $40 million in debt. TMG stated that Depp was responsible for his own fiscal mismanagement and countersued him for unpaid fees. In a related suit, Depp also sued his lawyers, Bloom Hergott, in January 2017. Both lawsuits were settled, the former in 2018 and the latter in 2019.

In 2018, two of Depp's former bodyguards sued him for unpaid wages and unsafe working conditions. Among other complaints, the two bodyguards claimed in their suit that they were required to perform tasks that were beyond the scope of their capacity as bodyguards, including being asked to repeatedly drive vehicles that "contained illegal substances, open containers and minors". Despite this and despite being exposed to other unsafe working conditions while putting in 12-hour work shifts on the job without rest or meal breaks, the bodyguards added, they were neither paid overtime nor otherwise fairly or lawfully compensated. The suit was settled in 2019.

Also in 2018, Depp was sued for allegedly hitting and verbally insulting a crew member while under the influence of alcohol on the set of City of Lies. A lawyer for Depp told the media that "Depp never touched the [crew member], as over a dozen witnesses present will attest"; meanwhile, Depp's legal team entered a court filing that did not admit that Depp hit the crew member, but stated that the crew member "provoked" the incident with "unlawful and wrongful conduct", causing Depp and film director Brad Furman to fear for their safety. A film script supervisor submitted a court declaration that Depp did not hit the crew member, and only scolded him. Before the lawsuit went to trial, a tentative settlement regarding the dismissal of the lawsuit was reached between Depp and the crew member in July 2022.

In August 2022, Depp and Jeff Beck were accused of plagiarizing a poem by an incarcerated African American man, incorporating its verses into the lyrics to their song "Sad Motherfuckin' Parade" in their 2022 collaborative album, 18. Bruce Jackson, the folklorist who made the accusation, requested that Depp and Beck give due credit to Slim Wilson, the alleged originator of the lyrics, for the song, and that proceeds from 18 be donated to an African American charity. In response, Depp and Beck sued Jackson, claiming that "Sad Motherfuckin' Parade" is an "original work of authorship and creativity" and that Jackson's accusation amounts to a cash grab. Jackson responded by noting that he had never made any "formal financial demands" and, while maintaining that Depp and Beck never wrote the lyrics to that song, said that them suing the person who caught them stealing the lyrics is akin to "a burglar suing a homeowner because he cut his hand on the kitchen window he broke getting in". This lawsuit is still ongoing.

=== Alcohol and drug use ===
Depp has struggled with substance abuse for much of his life. He has stated that he began using drugs by taking his mother's "nerve pills" at the age of 11, was smoking at age 12 and by the age of 14 had used "every kind of drugs there were". In a 1997 interview, Depp acknowledged past abuse of alcohol during the filming of What's Eating Gilbert Grape? (1993). In a 2008 interview, Depp stated that he had "poisoned" himself with alcohol "for years". In 2013, Depp declared that he had stopped drinking alcohol, adding that he "pretty much got everything [he] could get out of it"; Depp also said, "I investigated wine and spirits thoroughly, and they certainly investigated me as well, and we found out that we got along beautifully, but maybe too well." Regarding his breakup with longtime partner Vanessa Paradis, Depp said that he "definitely wasn't going to rely on the drink to ease things or cushion the blow or cushion the situation ...[because] that could have been fatal". In a 2018 Rolling Stone profile of Depp, reporter Stephen Rodrick wrote that he had used hashish in his presence and described him as "alternately hilarious, sly and incoherent"; Depp also said that the allegation made by his former business managers that he had spent US$30,000 per month on wine was "insulting" because he had spent "far more" than that amount. During his 2020 libel trial, Depp admitted to having been addicted to Roxicodone and to having misused alcohol. He also admitted to using other substances such as marijuana, MDMA and cocaine but denied ever having been addicted to any of them.

=== Political views ===
In November 2016, Depp joined the campaign Imprisoned for Art to call for the release of Ukrainian filmmaker Oleg Sentsov, who was being held in custody in Russia.

At the Glastonbury Festival 2017, Depp, criticizing President Donald Trump, asked: "When was the last time an actor assassinated a president? I want to clarify: I'm not an actor. I lie for a living. However, it's been a while and maybe it's time. I'm not insinuating anything." The comment was interpreted as a reference to John Wilkes Booth, the actor who assassinated Abraham Lincoln. Shawn Holtzclaw of the Secret Service told CNN they were aware of Depp's comment, but that "for security reasons, we cannot discuss specifically nor in general terms the means and methods of how we perform our protective responsibilities". Depp apologized shortly afterward, saying the remark "did not come out as intended, and I intended no malice".

== Acting credits and awards ==
According to the review aggregate site Rotten Tomatoes, Depp's most critically and commercially successful films include A Nightmare on Elm Street (1984), Edward Scissorhands (1990), Arizona Dream (1993), What's Eating Gilbert Grape (1993), Ed Wood (1994), Donnie Brasco (1997), Sleepy Hollow (1999), Chocolat (2000), Pirates of the Caribbean: The Curse of the Black Pearl (2003) and its sequels, Finding Neverland (2004), Charlie and the Chocolate Factory (2005), Corpse Bride (2005), Sweeney Todd: The Demon Barber of Fleet Street (2007), Public Enemies (2009), Alice in Wonderland (2010), Rango (2011), Black Mass (2015) and Minamata (2020). His films have grossed $8 billion worldwide.

Depp has been recognized by the Academy of Motion Picture Arts and Sciences for the following performances:

- 76th Academy Awards (2004): Best Actor, nomination, for Pirates of the Caribbean: The Curse of the Black Pearl
- 77th Academy Awards (2005): Best Actor, nomination, for Finding Neverland
- 80th Academy Awards (2008): Best Actor, nomination, for Sweeney Todd: The Demon Barber of Fleet Street

Depp has won a Golden Globe Award Best Actor — Motion Picture Musical or Comedy for Sweeney Todd: The Demon Barber of Fleet Street, as well as an Actor Award for Outstanding Performance by a Male Actor in a Leading Role for Pirates of the Caribbean: The Curse of the Black Pearl. Depp has also received an Honorary César in 1999.

== Discography ==
Year	Song	Artist	Album	Credits
1994	"That Woman's Got Me Drinking"	Shane MacGowan and The Popes	The Snake	Guitar
1995	All tracks	P	P	Guitar, bass
1995	"Fade Away"	Oasis	The Help Album	Guitar
1997	"Fade In-Out"	Oasis	Be Here Now	Guitar
1999	"Hollywood Affair"	Iggy Pop	"Corruption" (B-side)	Featured performer
2000	"St. Germain"	Vanessa Paradis	Bliss	Co-writer
2000	"Bliss"	Vanessa Paradis	Bliss	Co-writer
2000	"Firmaman"	Vanessa Paradis	Bliss	Guitar
2000	"Minor Swing"	Rachel Portman	Chocolat (Original Motion Picture Soundtrack)	Guitar
2000	"They're Red Hot"	Rachel Portman	Chocolat (Original Motion Picture Soundtrack)	Guitar
2000	"Caravan"	Rachel Portman	Chocolat (Original Motion Picture Soundtrack)	Guitar
2003	"Sand's Theme"	Various artists	Once Upon A Time In Mexico (Original Motion Picture Soundtrack)	Composer
2007	"No Place Like London"	Various artists	Sweeney Todd: The Demon Barber of Fleet Street: The Motion Picture Soundtrack	Performer
2007	"My Friends"	Various artists	Sweeney Todd: The Demon Barber of Fleet Street: The Motion Picture Soundtrack	Performer
2007	"Pirelli's Miracle Elixir"	Various artists	Sweeney Todd: The Demon Barber of Fleet Street: The Motion Picture Soundtrack	Performer
2007	"Pretty Women"	Various artists	Sweeney Todd: The Demon Barber of Fleet Street: The Motion Picture Soundtrack	Performer
2007	"Epiphany"	Various artists	Sweeney Todd: The Demon Barber of Fleet Street: The Motion Picture Soundtrack	Performer
2007	"A Little Priest"	Various artists	Sweeney Todd: The Demon Barber of Fleet Street: The Motion Picture Soundtrack	Performer
2007	"Johanna (Reprise)"	Various artists	Sweeney Todd: The Demon Barber of Fleet Street: The Motion Picture Soundtrack	Performer
2007	"By the Sea"	Various artists	Sweeney Todd: The Demon Barber of Fleet Street: The Motion Picture Soundtrack	Performer
2007	"Final Scene"	Various artists	Sweeney Todd: The Demon Barber of Fleet Street: The Motion Picture Soundtrack	Performer
2008	"Too Close to the Sun"	Glenn Tilbrook and The Fluffers	Pandemonium Ensues	Guitar
2010	"I Put a Spell on You"	Shane MacGowan and Friends	—	Guitar
2010	"Unloveable"	Babybird	Ex-Maniac	Guitar
2011	"Kemp in the Village"	Christopher Young	The Rum Diary (Original Motion Picture Soundtrack)	Performer, co-writer
2011	"The Mermaid Song" (instrumental)	Christopher Young	The Rum Diary (Original Motion Picture Soundtrack)	Piano
2011	"Ballade de Melody Nelson"	Lulu Gainsbourg	From Gainsbourg to Lulu	Co-lead vocals, guitar, bass, drums
2011	"The Jesus Stag Night Club"	Babybird	The Pleasures of Self Destruction	Guitar
2012	"Freedom Fighter"	Aerosmith	Music from Another Dimension!	Background vocals
2012	"You're So Vain"	Marilyn Manson	Born Villain	Guitar, drums, production
2012	"Street Runners"	Jup & Rob Jackson	Collective Bargaining	Featured performer
2012	"Little Lion Man"	Various artists	West of Memphis: Voices of Justice	Performer
2012	"Damien Echols Death Row Letter Year 16"	Various artists	West of Memphis: Voices of Justice	Performer
2013	"The Mermaid"	Various artists	Son of Rogues Gallery: Pirate Ballads, Sea Songs & Chanteys	Guitar, drums
2013	"The Brooklyn Shuffle"	Steve Hunter	The Manhattan Blues Project	Guitar
2013	"New Year"	Vanessa Paradis	Love Songs	Co-writer
2013	"Poor Paddy on the Railway"	Various artists	The Lone Ranger: Wanted (Music Inspired by the Film)	Guitar
2013	"Sweet Betsy from Pike"	Various artists	The Lone Ranger: Wanted (Music Inspired by the Film)	Arrangement
2014	"Kansas City"	The New Basement Tapes	Lost on the River: The New Basement Tapes	Guitar
2014	"Hello, Little Girl"	Various artists	Into the Woods (Original Motion Picture Soundtrack)	Performer
2015	All tracks	Hollywood Vampires	Hollywood Vampires	Guitar, keyboards, backing vocals, co-writer, sound design
2015	"21+"	Butch Walker	Afraid of Ghosts	Guitar
2019	All tracks	Hollywood Vampires	Rise	Guitar, keyboards, backing vocals, co-writer, sound design
2022	All tracks	Jeff Beck & Johnny Depp	18	Vocals, acoustic guitar, rhythm guitar, bass, drums, backing vocals, co-writer

== See also ==
- List of people from Kentucky
- List of atheists in film, radio, television and theater
- List of actors with Academy Award nominations
- List of actors with two or more Academy Award nominations in acting categories
