= List of awards and nominations received by Johnny Depp =

Johnny Depp awards and nominations
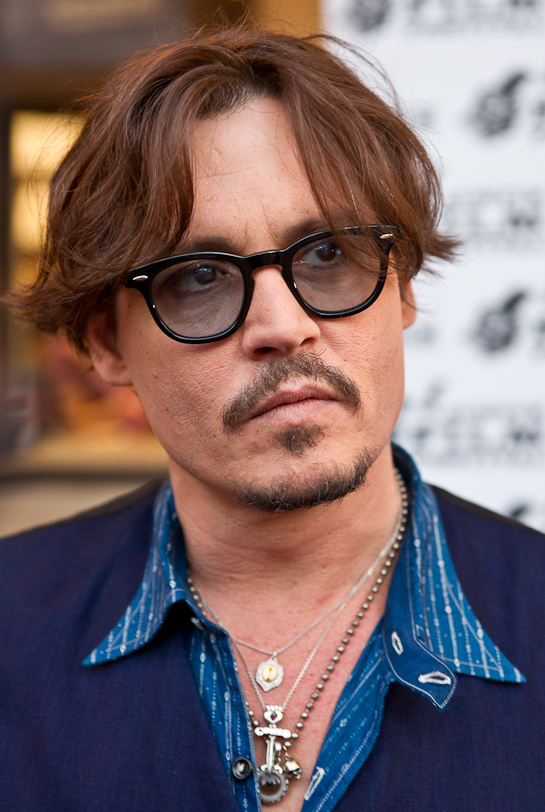
- Depp in 2011
Awards and nominations
Award	Wins	Nominations
Academy Awards	0	3
BAFTA Awards	0	2
Critics’ Choice Awards	0	5
Golden Globes	1	10
Kids' Choice Awards	3	10
MTV Movie & TV Awards	5	8
People's Choice Awards	15	19
SAG Awards	1	5

Totals (Note: Certain award groups do not simply award one winner. They acknowledge several different recipients, have runners-up, and have third place. Since this is a specific recognition and is different from losing an award, runner-up mentions are considered wins in this award tally. For simplification and to avoid errors, each award in this list has been presumed to have had a prior nomination.)
- Wins: 16
- Nominations: 27

This article is a List of awards and nominations received by Johnny Depp.

Johnny Depp is an American actor, film producer and musician known for his portrayal of eccentric characters in Hollywood films. Depp has won numerous awards and nominations throughout his acting career including a Golden Globe Award and a Screen Actors Guild Award as well as nominations for three Academy Awards, two British Academy Film Awards and five Critics' Choice Awards He has also received several audience awards including Kids' Choice Awards, five MTV Movie Awards, and fifteen People's Choice Awards.

Depp established himself as a film star by taking early roles such as the title role in the fantasy romance Edward Scissorhands (1990), an eccentric cousin in the romantic dramedy Benny & Joon (1993), and the title role in the biographical dramedy Ed Wood (1994), each of which earned him nominations for the Golden Globe Award for Best Actor in a Motion Picture – Musical or Comedy. He gained worldwide stardom for his role as Captain Jack Sparrow in the swashbuckling action film Pirates of the Caribbean: The Curse of the Black Pearl (2003) for which he received the Screen Actors Guild Award for Outstanding Actor in a Leading Role as well as nominations for the Academy Award for Best Actor, the BAFTA Award for Best Actor in a Leading Role, and the Golden Globe Award for Best Actor - Motion Picture Musical or Comedy.

He furthered his career portraying author Sir J. M. Barrie in the biographical fantasy Finding Neverland (2004) for which he earned nominations for the Academy Award for Best Actor, the BAFTA Award for Best Actor in a Leading Role, the Golden Globe Award for Best Actor in a Motion Picture – Drama, and the Screen Actors Guild Award for Outstanding Actor in a Leading Role. He portrayed assassin Sweeney Todd in the gothic musical adaptation Sweeney Todd: The Demon Barber of Fleet Street earning the Golden Globe Award for Best Actor in a Motion Picture – Musical or Comedy as well as nominations for the Academy Award for Best Actor and the Critics' Choice Movie Award for Best Actor. He took on the role of the Mad Hatter in Alice in Wonderland where she was nominated for a Golden Globe Award for Best Actor and mob boss Whitey Bulger in the crime drama Black Mass (2015) where he was nominated for the Critics' Choice Award and the Screen Actors Guild Award for Best Actor.

In 1999, Depp received the Honorary César as well as a star on the Hollywood Walk of Fame for his contributions to the motion picture industry. Depp has also received awards from outside the entertainment industry. In 2006, he received the Grand Vermeil Medal of the City of Paris and the Children's Hospital Los Angeles "Courage to Care" award for entertaining children through his films and his advocacy for children and children's charities. In 2012, he became the first male recipient of the CFDA Fashion Awards "Fashion Icon Award". In 2016, he received the inaugural “Healing & Hope Award” for charity work towards victims of cancer. In 2022, he received the Gold Medal of Merit in Serbia.

== Major awards ==
=== Academy Awards ===
Year	Category	Nominated work	Result	Ref.
2004	Best Actor	Pirates of the Caribbean: The Curse of the Black Pearl	Nominated	
2005	Best Actor	Finding Neverland	Nominated	
2008	Best Actor	Sweeney Todd: The Demon Barber of Fleet Street	Nominated	

=== BAFTA Awards ===
Year	Category	Nominated work	Result	Ref.
British Academy Film Awards
2004	Best Actor in a Leading Role	Pirates of the Caribbean: The Curse of the Black Pearl	Nominated	
2005	Best Actor in a Leading Role	Finding Neverland	Nominated	

=== César Awards ===
Year	Category	Nominated work	Result	Ref.
1999	Honorary César		Honored	

=== Critics' Choice Awards ===
Year	Category	Nominated work	Result	Ref.
Critics' Choice Movie Awards
2004	Best Actor	Pirates of the Caribbean: The Curse of the Black Pearl	Nominated	
2005	Best Actor	Finding Neverland	Nominated	
2008	Best Actor	Sweeney Todd: The Demon Barber of Fleet Street	Nominated	
2008	Best Acting Ensemble	Sweeney Todd: The Demon Barber of Fleet Street	Nominated	
2016	Best Actor	Black Mass	Nominated	

=== Golden Globe Awards ===
Year	Category	Nominated work	Result	Ref.
1991	Best Actor – Motion Picture Musical or Comedy	Edward Scissorhands	Nominated	
1994	Best Actor – Motion Picture Musical or Comedy	Benny & Joon	Nominated	
1995	Best Actor – Motion Picture Musical or Comedy	Ed Wood	Nominated	
2004	Best Actor – Motion Picture Musical or Comedy	Pirates of the Caribbean: The Curse of the Black Pearl	Nominated	
2005	Best Actor – Motion Picture Drama	Finding Neverland	Nominated	
2006	Best Actor – Motion Picture Musical or Comedy	Charlie and the Chocolate Factory	Nominated	
2007	Best Actor – Motion Picture Musical or Comedy	Pirates of the Caribbean: Dead Man's Chest	Nominated	
2008	Best Actor – Motion Picture Musical or Comedy	Sweeney Todd: The Demon Barber of Fleet Street	Won	
2011	Best Actor – Motion Picture Musical or Comedy	Alice in Wonderland	Nominated	
2011	Best Actor – Motion Picture Musical or Comedy	The Tourist	Nominated	

=== Screen Actors Guild Awards ===
Year	Category	Nominated work	Result	Ref.
2001	Cast in a Motion Picture	Chocolat	Nominated	
2004	Male Lead in a Motion Picture	Pirates of the Caribbean: The Curse of the Black Pearl	Won	
2005	Cast in a Motion Picture	Finding Neverland	Nominated	
2005	Male Lead in a Motion Picture	Finding Neverland	Nominated	
2016	Male Lead in a Motion Picture	Black Mass	Nominated	

== Critics awards ==
Organizations	Year	Category	Work	Result	Ref.
Indiana Film Journalists Association	2015	Best Actor	Black Mass	Nominated	
London Critics Circle Film Awards	1996	Actor of the Year	Ed Wood / Don Juan DeMarco	Won	
London Critics Circle Film Awards	2005	Actor of the Year	Finding Neverland	Nominated	
Online Film Critics Society Awards	2004	Best Actor	Pirates of the Caribbean: The Curse of the Black Pearl	Nominated	
Phoenix Film Critics Society	2004	Best Actor in a Leading Role	Pirates of the Caribbean: The Curse of the Black Pearl	Nominated	
Russian Guild of Film Critics	1998	Best Foreign Actor	Fear and Loathing in Las Vegas	Won	
Washington D.C. Area Film Critics Association	2003	Best Actor	Pirates of the Caribbean: The Curse of the Black Pearl	Nominated	
Washington D.C. Area Film Critics Association	2015	Best Actor	Black Mass	Nominated	

== Festival accolades ==
Festival	Year	Category	Nominated work	Result	Ref.
Alice nella Città	2021	One of the most beloved artists of all time in Italy		Won	
Bahamas International Film Festival	2009	Career Achievement Award		Won	
Cannes Film Festival	1997	Palme d'Or	The Brave	Nominated	
Cannes Film Festival	1997	Caméra d'Or	The Brave	Nominated	
Capri Hollywood Roma Fall Gala	2024	Capri Cult Award	Modì, Three Days on the Wing of Madness	Won	
Deauville American Film Festival	2019	Talent Award		Won	
Küstendorf Film and Music Festival	2010	Award for Future Films		Won	
Palm Springs International Film Festival	2016	Desert Palm Achievement Award, Actor	Black Mass	Won	
Rome Film Festival	2024	Lifetime Achievement Award		Won	
San Sebastián International Film Festival	2021	Donostia Award		Won	
Santa Barbara International Film Festival	2016	Maltin Modern Master Award	Black Mass	Won	

Depp was a guest of honor at the 2018 Zurich Film Festival where he attended the world premiere of his film Richard Says Goodbye and a ZFF Masters moderated discussion. He also gave a ZFF Masters session and presented the documentary Crock of Gold: A Few Rounds with Shane MacGowan at the festival in 2020. In August 2021, he was a honored guest at the 55th Karlovy Vary International Film Festival where he introduced the Crock of Gold documentary and participated in a live discussion after the screening, and also introduced the film Minamata. In September 2021, before accepting the Donostia Award at the San Sebastián International Film Festival, he was a guest of honor at the Deauville American Film Festival where he participated in a live public discussion on his acting career and presented the French premiere of the film City of Lies, in his third appearance at the Deauville festival on the 20th anniversary of his first appearance. At Alice nella Città (an autonomous section of the Rome Film Festival) in October 2021, Depp presented the Puffins animated series and was surprised with the award for the "most beloved actor of all time" at the end of his masterclass on his acting roles.

== Miscellaneous awards ==
Organizations	Year	Category	Work	Result	Ref.
Actors Fund of America Gala	2004	Lee Strasberg Artistic Achievement Award		Won	
Blockbuster Entertainment Awards	2000	Favorite Actor, Horror	Sleepy Hollow	Won	
Empire Awards	2004	Best Actor	Pirates of the Caribbean: The Curse of the Black Pearl	Won	
Empire Awards	2005	Best Actor	Finding Neverland	Nominated	
Empire Awards	2006	Best Actor	Charlie and the Chocolate Factory	Won	
Empire Awards	2007	Best Actor	Pirates of the Caribbean: Dead Man's Chest	Nominated	
Empire Awards	2009	Best Actor	Sweeney Todd: The Demon Barber of Fleet Street	Nominated	
Golden Raspberry Awards	2014	Worst Actor	The Lone Ranger	Nominated	
Golden Raspberry Awards	2016	Worst Actor	Mortdecai	Nominated	
Golden Raspberry Awards	2016	Worst Screen Combo	Mortdecai	Nominated	
Golden Raspberry Awards	2017	Worst Supporting Actor	Alice Through the Looking Glass	Nominated	
Golden Raspberry Awards	2017	Worst Screen Combo	Alice Through the Looking Glass	Nominated	
Golden Raspberry Awards	2018	Worst Actor	Pirates of the Caribbean: Dead Men Tell No Tales	Nominated	
Golden Raspberry Awards	2018	Worst Screen Combo	Pirates of the Caribbean: Dead Men Tell No Tales	Nominated	
Golden Raspberry Awards	2019	Worst Actor	Sherlock Gnomes	Nominated	
Golden Raspberry Awards	2019	Worst Screen Combo	Sherlock Gnomes	Nominated	
IFTA Film & Drama Awards	2004	Best International Actor	Pirates of the Caribbean: The Curse of the Black Pearl	Won	
IFTA Film & Drama Awards	2005	Best International Actor	Charlie and the Chocolate Factory	Nominated	
MTV Movie Awards	1994	Best Comedic Performance	Benny & Joon	Nominated	
MTV Movie Awards	2004	Best Male Performance	Pirates of the Caribbean: The Curse of the Black Pearl	Won	
MTV Movie Awards	2004	Best Comedic Performance	Pirates of the Caribbean: The Curse of the Black Pearl	Nominated	
MTV Movie Awards	2007	Best Performance	Pirates of the Caribbean: Dead Man's Chest	Won	
MTV Movie Awards	2008	Best Comedic Performance	Pirates of the Caribbean: At World's End	Won	
MTV Movie Awards	2008	Best Villain	Sweeney Todd: The Demon Barber of Fleet Street	Won	
MTV Movie Awards	2010	Global Superstar	—N/a	Nominated	
MTV Movie Awards	2012	MTV Generation Award	—N/a	Won	
National Movie Awards	2007	Best Male Performance	Pirates of the Caribbean: At World's End	Nominated	
National Movie Awards	2008	Best Male Performance	Sweeney Todd: The Demon Barber of Fleet Street	Won	
National Movie Awards	2011	Screen Icon	—N/a	Recipient	
Nickelodeon Kids' Choice Awards	1991	Favorite Movie Actor	Charlie and the Chocolate Factory	Nominated	
Nickelodeon Kids' Choice Awards	2006	Favorite Voice From an Animated Movie	Corpse Bride	Nominated	
Nickelodeon Kids' Choice Awards	2007	Favorite Movie Actor	Pirates of the Caribbean: Dead Man's Chest	Nominated	
Nickelodeon Kids' Choice Awards	2008	Favorite Movie Actor	Pirates of the Caribbean: At World's End	Won	
Nickelodeon Kids' Choice Awards	2011	Favorite Movie Actor	Alice in Wonderland	Won	
Nickelodeon Kids' Choice Awards	2012	Favorite Movie Actor	Pirates of the Caribbean: On Stranger Tides	Nominated	
Nickelodeon Kids' Choice Awards	2012	Favorite Voice From an Animated Movie	Rango	Nominated	
Nickelodeon Kids' Choice Awards	2013	Favorite Movie Actor	Dark Shadows	Won	
Nickelodeon Kids' Choice Awards	2014	Favorite Movie Actor	The Lone Ranger	Nominated	
Nickelodeon Kids' Choice Awards	2014	Favorite Male Butt Kicker	The Lone Ranger	Nominated	
People's Choice Awards	2005	Favorite Male Movie Star	—N/a	Won	
People's Choice Awards	2005	Favorite On-Screen Match-Up with Kate Winslet	Finding Neverland	Nominated	
People's Choice Awards	2006	Favorite Motion Picture Actor	Charlie and the Chocolate Factory	Won	
People's Choice Awards	2007	Favorite Male Action Star	—N/a	Won	
People's Choice Awards	2007	Favorite Male Movie Star	—N/a	Won	
People's Choice Awards	2007	Favorite On Screen Couple with Keira Knightley	Pirates of the Caribbean: Dead Man's Chest	Won	
People's Choice Awards	2008	Favorite Male Action Star	—N/a	Nominated	
People's Choice Awards	2008	Favorite Male Movie Star	—N/a	Won	
People's Choice Awards	2010	Favorite Movie Actor	—N/a	Won	
People's Choice Awards	2010	Actor of the Decade	—N/a	Won	
People's Choice Awards	2011	Favorite Movie Actor	—N/a	Won	
People's Choice Awards	2012	Favorite Animated Movie Voice	Rango	Won	
People's Choice Awards	2013	Favorite Movie Actor	—N/a	Nominated	
People's Choice Awards	2014	Favorite Movie Actor	—N/a	Won	
People's Choice Awards	2016	Favorite Movie Actor	—N/a	Nominated	
People's Choice Awards	2016	Favorite Dramatic Movie Actor	—N/a	Won	
People's Choice Awards	2017	Favorite Movie Icon	—N/a	Won	
People's Choice Awards	2018	Favorite Movie Icon	—N/a	Won	
Rembrandt Awards	2007	Best Foreign Actor	Pirates of the Caribbean: Dead Man's Chest	Won	
Rembrandt Awards	2011	Best Foreign Actor	Alice in Wonderland	Won	
Satellite Awards	2000	Best Actor – Motion Picture Musical or Comedy	Sleepy Hollow	Nominated	
Satellite Awards	2004	Best Actor – Motion Picture Musical or Comedy	Pirates of the Caribbean: The Curse of the Black Pearl	Nominated	
Satellite Awards	2004	Best Actor – Motion Picture Musical or Comedy	Once Upon a Time in Mexico	Nominated	
Satellite Awards	2005	Best Actor – Motion Picture Drama	Finding Neverland	Nominated	
Satellite Awards	2009	Best Actor – Motion Picture Drama	Public Enemies	Nominated	
Satellite Awards	2015	Best Actor	Black Mass	Nominated	
Saturn Awards	2000	Best Actor	Sleepy Hollow	Nominated	
Saturn Awards	2002	Best Actor	From Hell	Nominated	
Saturn Awards	2004	Best Actor	Pirates of the Caribbean: The Curse of the Black Pearl	Nominated	
Saturn Awards	2005	Best Actor	Finding Neverland	Nominated	
Saturn Awards	2008	Best Actor	Sweeney Todd: The Demon Barber of Fleet Street	Nominated	
ShoWest Awards	1990	Male Star of Tomorrow		Won	
Teen Choice Awards	2004	Choice Movie: Fight with Geoffrey Rush	Pirates of the Caribbean: The Curse of the Black Pearl	Won	
Teen Choice Awards	2004	Choice Movie: Liar	Pirates of the Caribbean: The Curse of the Black Pearl	Won	
Teen Choice Awards	2005	Choice Movie Actor: Drama	Finding Neverland	Nominated	
Teen Choice Awards	2006	Choice Movie Actor: Comedy	Charlie and the Chocolate Factory	Won	
Teen Choice Awards	2006	Choice Movie Actor: Action	Pirates of the Caribbean: Dead Man's Chest	Won	
Teen Choice Awards	2007	Choice Movie Actor: Action	Pirates of the Caribbean: At World's End	Won	
Teen Choice Awards	2008	Choice Movie: Villain	Sweeney Todd: The Demon Barber of Fleet Street	Won	
Teen Choice Awards	2009	Choice Summer Movie Star: Male	Public Enemies	Nominated	
Teen Choice Awards	2011	Choice Movie Actor: Action	The Tourist	Won	
Teen Choice Awards	2011	Choice Movie Actor: Sci-Fi/Fantasy	Pirates of the Caribbean: On Stranger Tides	Nominated	
Teen Choice Awards	2011	Choice Movie: Voice	Rango	Won	
Teen Choice Awards	2017	Choice Movie Actor: Action	Pirates of the Caribbean: Dead Men Tell No Tales	Nominated	
Teen Choice Awards	2019	Choice Movie: Villain	Fantastic Beasts: The Crimes of Grindelwald	Nominated	
Telegatti	1997[it]	Foreign cinema on TV[it]		Won	
