= Tarrant Hightopp =

Mad Hatter in 2010 film Alice in Wonderland

- Alice in Wonderland character
- Johnny Depp as Tarrant Hightopp in Alice in Wonderland (2010)
- First appearance: Alice in Wonderland (2010)
- Last appearance: Alice Through the Looking Glass (2016)
- Based on: Hatter by Lewis Carroll
- Adapted by: Tim Burton; Linda Woolverton
- Designed by: Colleen Atwood
- Portrayed by: Johnny Depp; Other: Louis Ashbourne Serkis (young)

In-universe information
- Full name: Tarrant Hightopp
- Alias: The Mad Hatter, Hatter
- Occupation: Milliner
- Family: Zanik Hightopp (father); Tyva Hightopp (mother); Paloo Hightopp and Pimlick Hightopp (sister and brother); Bumalig Hightopp and Poomally Hightopp (aunt and uncle); Bim Hightopp (cousin)
- Home: Wonderland

Tarrant Hightopp, also known as the Mad Hatter, is a fictional character in the 2010 film Alice in Wonderland and its 2016 sequel Alice Through the Looking Glass, based upon the original character from Lewis Carroll's Alice novels. He is portrayed by actor Johnny Depp.

== Appearances ==
=== Alice in Wonderland (2010) ===
In the film, Tarrant takes Alice Kingsleigh toward the White Queen's castle and relates the terror of the Red Queen's reign while commenting that Alice is not the same as she once was. Tarrant subsequently helps Alice avoid capture by the Red Queen's guards by allowing himself to be seized instead. He is later saved from execution by the Cheshire Cat and calls for rebellion against the Red Queen. Near the end of the film, the Hatter unsuccessfully suggests to Alice that she could stay in Wonderland and consummate his feelings for her.

=== Alice Through the Looking Glass (2016) ===
In the beginning of the film, Tarrant is in poor health because his family is missing following the Attack of the Jabberwocky. The attack occurred shortly after his father, Zanik, a hat retailer, seemed to reject Tarrant's gift of a hat creation. For the majority of the film, Alice Kingsleigh travels through time (with an object called the "Chronosphere") attempting to rescue the Hatter's family from death, as he appears to be dying. At the end of the film, the Hightopp family turns out to be alive, and he is reunited with them.

The Hatter's backstory is also explored in the film.

Rhys Ifans plays Zanik, the Hatter's father, while Simone Kirby plays Tyva, the Hatter's mother with Joe Hurst, Oliver Hawkes, Siobhan Redmond, Frederick Warder, Eve Hedderwick Turner, and Tom Godwin playing members of his extended family, each being Bim (Oliver Hawkes playing a younger version, as an unspecified member of the Hightopp family), Bumalig (the Hatter's aunt), Poomally (the Hatter's uncle), Baloo and Pimlick (the Hatter's siblings) respectively.

== Reception ==
Mia Wasikowska, who plays Alice in the film, said that the Hatter and Alice "both feel like outsiders and feel alone in their separate worlds, and have a special bond and friendship." Burton explained that Depp "tried to find a grounding to the character ... as opposed to just being mad. In a lot of versions it's a very one-note kind of character and you know [Depp's] goal was to try and bring out a human side to the strangeness of the character." The Hatter's orange hair is an allusion to the mercury poisoning suffered by milliners who used mercury to cure felt; Depp believes that the character "was poisoned ... and it was coming out through his hair, through his fingernails and eyes". Depp and Burton decided that the Hatter's clothes, skin, hair, personality and accent would change throughout the film to reflect his emotions. In an interview with Depp, the character was paralleled to "a mood ring, [as] his emotions are very close to the surface". The Hatter is "made up of different people and their extreme sides", with a gentle voice much like the character's creator Lewis Carroll reflecting the lighter personality and with a Scottish Glaswegian accent (which Depp modeled after Gregor Fisher's Rab C. Nesbitt character) reflecting a darker, more dangerous personality. Illusionary dancer David "Elsewhere" Bernal doubled for Depp during the "Futterwacken" sequence near the end of the film.

David Edelstein of New York Magazine remarked that while the elements of the character suggested by Depp don't entirely come together, "Depp brings an infectious summer-stock zest to everything he does: I picture him digging through trunks of old costumes and trying on this torn vest and that dusty cravat and sitting in front of his dressing-room mirror playing with makeup and bulging his eyes and sticking out his tongue." J. Hoberman of The Village Voice simply referred to Depp's Hatter as "amusing". Bill Goodykoontz of The Arizona Republic said that "Depp is exactly what you'd expect, which is a good thing. Gap-toothed and leering, at times he looks like Madonna after sticking a fork in a toaster. How he finds his characters is anybody's guess, a sort of thrift-store warehouse of eccentricities, it seems like. But it works." Chris Vognar of The Dallas Morning News stated that Depp's "wide eyes and high whimsy feel a bit derivative of his Willy Wonka (another collaboration with Burton), but he invests so much of his ample energy and instinct in these roles that it's hard to complain."

Owen Gleiberman of Entertainment Weekly had a more mixed opinion and commented that Depp as the Hatter is "a fantastic image, but once Depp opens his mouth, what comes out is a noisome Scottish brogue that makes everything he says sound more or less the same. The character offers no captivatingly skewed bat-house psychology. There isn't much to him, really—he's just a smiling Johnny one-note with a secret hip-hop dance move—and so we start to react to him the way that Alice does to everything else: by wondering when he's going to stop making nonsense." Kenneth Turan of Los Angeles Times stated that "there's no denying Depp's gifts and abilities, but this performance feels both indulgent and something we've all seen before." Christopher Rosen of The New York Observer observed that acting-wise, "Mr. Depp is tasked with the heavy lifting, but, festooned in an orange fright wig and some very uncomfortable-looking contact lenses, he can't even be bothered to keep his accent straight (it vacillates between an effete lisp and an angry Scottish brogue) ... he acts like even being on set was a chore. It wouldn't have been a surprise to see him break the fourth wall, take the blue pill and return home to Paris. Frankly, with how much the film drags, you'll probably wish he had."
