= Infinitum Nihil =

American film production company

- Type: Private
- Industry: Motion picture
- Founded: 2004
- Founder: Johnny Depp
- Headquarters: Los Angeles
- Key people: Christi Dembrowski (President); Sam Sarkar (Director of Development)
- Products: Film production
- Website: infinitum-nihil.com; in2.film.com

Infinitum Nihil is an American film production company, founded by Johnny Depp. The company is run by Depp's sister Christi Dembrowski. Depp founded the company in 2004 to develop projects where he will serve as actor and/or producer. The name means "Nothing infinite" in Latin.

== History ==
The Rum Diary, based on the novel by Hunter S. Thompson, was released on October 28, 2011, starring Depp as Paul Kemp in a screenplay adapted and directed by Bruce Robinson.

Dark Shadows was released on May 11, 2012. Depp starred in and produced this gothic film based on the Dark Shadows TV series and directed by Tim Burton.

In 2011, it was announced that The Walt Disney Company had picked up The Night Stalker and a biopic of Paul Revere, both as possible starring vehicles for Depp. He will produce both films with Christi Dembrowski. It was also announced that the company and Illumination Entertainment will co-produce a biopic of Dr. Seuss, with Depp slated to produce and possibly star.

On February 7, 2012, it was announced that the company will produce a film based on the memoir of the West Memphis Three's Damien Echols. The book (and subsequently, the film) will focus on Echols' experience on death row after being wrongfully convicted for three murders with two friends in 1993. Depp, who is a big supporter of the Memphis Three and proving their innocence, will co-produce the film with Christi Dembrowski, Echols, and his wife, Lorri Davis.

In October 2012, it was announced that Depp will start a publishing company sharing the name "Infinitum Nihil" with the production company. It will be part of HarperCollins, and according to Depp will "deliver publications worthy of peoples' time, of peoples' concern, publications that might ordinarily never have breached the parapet."

In January 2013, the imprint company released its first book, House of Earth, written by folk singer Woody Guthrie in 1947. 2015 saw the release of The Unraveled Tales of Bob Dylan by Douglas Brinkley, as well as Narcisa by Jonathan Shaw.

In August 2017, it was announced that Infinitum Nihil would produce a television series based on Funcom's The Secret World IP. In 2017, his production company signed a deal with IM Global.

== IN.2 Film ==
In September 2021, at the San Sebastián International Film Festival, Depp announced the launch of IN.2 Film, a sister company to Infinitum Nihil, which is courting original, stage and literature-based scripts for film, stage and television productions. Depp explained: "From the student to the maestro, from the aspiring artists to the yet-knowns, to the well-established great masters across all forms of modern media, IN.2 will build a space where artists can be artists, where they will be free to create those unexpected moments, those happy accidents that contain the propensity to constitute great art and so bring their unique vision to life."

Depp expressed the motivation behind IN.2 Film, stating that after years in Hollywood he realised that "not every outing needs to be a blockbuster, that they don't need to be formulaic, commercial driven", asserting that "It's ludicrous to play everything safe, cinema audiences are getting bored." By late 2021, IN.2 Film was planning new projects, including some with Julien Temple, slated to be released in 2022 and 2023.

The Infinitum Nihil-produced Minamata was presented as a template for what IN.2 Film was trying to achieve. Asked whether he would act in some of the new company's projects, Depp answered: ""If there's something that they feel or I feel that I can add to the character, I'd be more than happy. So the answer is 'no,' but 'yes.' I would like to say 'yes' without saying 'no' but agree to both."

In May 2023, the film Jeanne du Barry, co-produced by IN.2 Film and starring French actress and filmmaker Maïwenn and Depp in the leading roles, premiered at the 2023 Cannes Film Festival as the opening film, and was released in France on the same day.

Depp directed his second film, the IN.2 Film- produced Modì, Three Days on the Wing of Madness, in September 2023. Riccardo Scamarcio, Bruno Gouery and Al Pacino starred in the biopic.

== Filmography ==
=== Inifinitum Nihil ===
| Year | Film | Director | Production company(s) | Budget | Gross | RT |
|---|---|---|---|---|---|---|
| 2011 | The Rum Diary | Bruce Robinson | Co-production with FilmDistrict and GK Films. | $45 million | $23.9 million | 50% |
| 2011 | Hugo | Martin Scorsese | Co-production with Paramount Pictures, Entertainment Film Distributors and GK Films. | $150 million | $185.8 million | 93% |
| 2012 | Dark Shadows | Tim Burton | Co-production with Warner Bros. Pictures, Roadshow Entertainment and Village Roadshow Pictures. | $150 million | $245.5 million | 36% |
| 2013 | The Lone Ranger | Gore Verbinski | Co-production with Walt Disney Pictures and Jerry Bruckheimer Films. | $250 million | $260.5 million | 31% |
| 2015 | Mortdecai | David Koepp | Co-production with Lionsgate and MWM Studios. | $60 million | $47.3 million | 12% |
| 2018 | City of Lies | Brad Furman | Co-production with Miramax. | —N/a | $2.8 million | 51% |
| 2018 | The Professor | Wayne Roberts | Co-production with Saban Capital Group and Open Road Films. | —N/a | $1.6 million | 11% |
| 2020 | Minamata | Andrew Levitas | Co-production with Metalwork Pictures. | $11 million | $1.7 million | 78% |

=== IN.2 Film ===
| Year | Film | Director | Production company(s) | Budget | Gross | RT |
|---|---|---|---|---|---|---|
| 2023 | Jeanne du Barry | Maïwenn | Co-production with Why Not Productions, Les Film du Fleuve, and La Petite Reine. | $22.4 million | $14.9 million | 49% |
| 2024 | Modì, Three Days on the Wing of Madness | Johnny Depp | Co-production with Proton Cinema. | | $510,613 | 44% |
| 2026 | Ebenezer | Ti West | Co-production with Paramount Pictures, Black Label Media, Motel Mojave and Wattsco. | | | |
| 2027 | Day Drinker | Marc Webb | Co-production with Lionsgate and Thunder Road Films. | | | |

== Bibliography ==
- House of Earth (2013)
- See Hear Yoko (2015)
- Narcisa (2015)
- The Unraveled Tales of Bob Dylan (2015)
