= Arizona Dream =

1993 film by Emir Kusturica

- U.S. theatrical release poster
- Directed by: Emir Kusturica
- Screenplay by: David Atkins
- Story by: Emir Kusturica; David Atkins
- Produced by: Claudie Ossard; Yves Marmion
- Starring: Johnny Depp; Jerry Lewis; Faye Dunaway; Lili Taylor; Vincent Gallo; Paulina Porizkova
- Cinematography: Vilko Filač
- Edited by: Andrija Zafranović
- Music by: Goran Bregović
- Production companies: Constellation; UGC; Hachette Premiere
- Distributed by: Warner Bros. (United States); UGC Fox Distribution (France)
- Release dates: January 6, 1993 (France); September 9, 1994 (US)
- Running time: 142 minutes
- Countries: United States; France
- Languages: English; Spanish; Inuktitut
- Budget: $15 million
- Box office: $112,547 (US)

Arizona Dream is a 1993 indie surrealist comedy drama film co-written and directed by Emir Kusturica and starring Johnny Depp, Jerry Lewis, Faye Dunaway, Lili Taylor and Vincent Gallo.

== Plot ==
Axel has a dream about an Inuit who catches a rare halibut and brings it back to his family in an igloo. Axel's cousin Paul coaxes Axel from his job tagging fish in New York City to Arizona to attend his uncle Leo's trophy wedding to a much younger woman. His uncle tries to persuade him to stay permanently and take over the family business of selling Cadillacs. Axel resists at first, but he decides to give it a try.

Axel encounters two strange women: Elaine, a woman who always had a dream of building a flying machine, and her stepdaughter Grace, who is jealous of Elaine and dreams of killing herself and being reincarnated as a turtle. In one scene, Axel and Paul are dealing with Grace's stubborn turtle at dinner. Grace is seen sitting in a chair that levitates as she smiles to her new friends. There seemed to be an implied symbolism that people saw Grace as one who transcends the way of the stubborn turtle.

Axel starts lusting after Elaine and decides to help make her dreams come true. As he and Elaine build the machine day by day, Grace starts destroying the contraption. Axel then rebuilds. Leo and Paul arrive at Elaine and Grace's house to encourage Axel to come back as Elaine threatens them with a shotgun. Axel and Elaine complete the machine and test it, but it crashes into a tree.

Axel then decides to put both Elaine and Grace out of their misery, but cannot go through with it. Grace has the idea to play Russian Roulette with him. Axel is scared at first, but at his second turn he pulls the trigger multiple times. The gun does not fire. Axel, Elaine, and Grace come to Paul's talent show. He decides to play Cary Grant's role from North by Northwest with the famous crop duster scene. Paul receives the score of 1. Leo's fiancée then approaches them to say that there is something wrong with Leo. Axel realizes that Leo is dying and calls an ambulance.

The day before Elaine's birthday a few months later, Axel and Paul finally come back to Elaine and Grace's house. Elaine is mad at Axel for not contacting her but forgives him. The next day on Elaine's birthday, Elaine is given an airplane as a present. The four celebrate Elaine's birthday by beating a piñata, but are interrupted by a storm. As the others dry off inside, Grace remains outside to free her turtles, telling them to "Go play," Axel goes upstairs with Grace to wrap the presents where she gives Axel a globe, telling him that she wants him to have the world. Axel tells Grace that Elaine has changed and that he is not in love with her any more. He makes a promise to Grace to go to Alaska.

Axel, Elaine, Grace, and Paul talk about the manners in which they want to die. Grace says that she is going to sleep and walks upstairs, dressing herself in a white shift and a hat with a veil. As she walks outside, Axel and Elaine see her through the window and run outside in an attempt to stop her. Grace shoots herself, and a lightning bolt destroys Elaine's airplane. Sometime after Grace's death Axel breaks into Uncle Leo's abandoned Cadillac store at night and goes to sleep on top of a Cadillac with a cat that has just had her litter. The film ends with Axel and Uncle Leo as Eskimos in Axel's dream. They catch the halibut and discuss it in a native language of the Eskimos, Inuktitut. The halibut flies from their hands into the sunrise.

== Cast ==
- Johnny Depp as Axel Blackmar
- Jerry Lewis as Leo Sweetie
- Faye Dunaway as Elaine Stalker
- Lili Taylor as Grace Stalker
- Vincent Gallo as Paul Leger
- Paulina Porizkova as Millie
- Michael J. Pollard as Fabian
- Candyce Mason as Blanche
- Alexia Rane as Angie
- Polly Noonan as Betty
- Ann Schulman as Carla
- James R. Wilson as Lawyer
- Kim Keo as The Mechanical Singing Doll

== Production ==
Many of the Arizona scenes were filmed in Douglas, Arizona, and Patagonia, Arizona

Filming took a year due to Kusturica suffering a nervous breakdown. Johnny Depp's hair length keeps changing because of this.

The original edit, as American Dreams, was four hours long. It was trimmed down to 2 hours 22 minutes for theatrical release as Arizona Dream. Some of the cut scenes are included as bonus material on StudioCanal's Blu-ray release.

The music video for the 1991 Tom Petty song, "Into the Great Wide Open", was shot during the filming of the movie.

== Reception ==
=== Critical response ===
Arizona Dream received a generally positive response from critics, garnering an 87% rating on Rotten Tomatoes based on 15 reviews with an average score of 6.82/10. Metacritic, which uses a weighted average, assigned the film a score of 62 out of 100, based on 17 critics, indicating "generally favorable" reviews.

Janet Maslin of The New York Times liked the film, praising it as "enjoyably adrift, a wildly off-the-wall reverie" and opining that its best feature is "its lunacy, which is so liberating".

Referring to Arizona Dream as "the quintessential Nuart movie", Los Angeles Times Kevin Thomas sees it as "a dazzling, daring slice of cockamamie tragicomic Americana envisioned with magic realism by a major, distinctive European filmmaker".

In his affirmative review in the Chicago Sun-Times, Roger Ebert called Arizona Dream "goofier than hell" while adding that "you can't stop watching it because nobody in the audience, and possibly nobody on the screen, has any idea what's going to happen next" and referring to Kusturica as "a filmmaker who has his own peculiar vision of the world that does not correspond to the weary write-by-numbers formulas of standard screenplays".

In 2024, when the film was rerelased in France in a restored 4K version, French magazine Paris Match called it a "cult film for all cinephile dreamers of the 1990s".

=== Year-end lists ===
- Dishonorable mention – William Arnold, Seattle Post-Intelligencer

=== Box office ===
Although filmed in 1991 and released throughout Europe in 1993, Arizona Dream was not theatrically released in the U.S. until September 9, 1994. Warner Brothers initially reduced it to two hours and tried to market it for the middle-of-the-road audience; when these attempts failed, they released the full version. As a result its total U.S. gross, in three theaters, was only $112,547.

=== Awards ===
The film won the Silver Bear - Special Jury Prize at the 43rd Berlin International Film Festival.

== Home media ==
In the United States, the Warner Archive Collection released the 119-minute cut of the film on a made-on-demand DVD on March 16, 2010.

In Europe, StudioCanal released the 142-minute cut of the film on DVD in 2004, HD DVD, and Blu-ray in 2009. The Blu-ray features an interview with Johnny Depp and deleted scenes. StudioCanal later released the 142-minute version on 4K Blu-ray in France and Germany in 2024; while Eagle Pictures released the film on 4K Blu-ray in Italy.

== Soundtrack ==
Soundtrack was by Goran Bregović featuring the vocals and lyrics of Iggy Pop on tracks 1, 4 & 6 and the lyrics of Emir Kusturica as well as the vocals of Iggy Pop on track 10. In the film, apart from the music on soundtrack, there are also three songs of Django Reinhardt.

== In popular culture ==
Foo Fighters front man Dave Grohl has revealed that the song "Enough Space", from their album The Colour and the Shape, is based on Arizona Dream.
