= Day Drinker =

Upcoming film by Marc Webb

- Teaser poster
- Directed by: Marc Webb
- Written by: Zach Dean
- Produced by: Basil Iwanyk; Erica Lee; Adam Kolbrenner; Zach Dean; Nathan Kahane
- Starring: Johnny Depp; Madelyn Cline; Penélope Cruz
- Cinematography: Javier Aguirresarobe
- Edited by: Kevin Greutert; Bomber Hurley Smith
- Production companies: Thunder Road Films; Infinitum Nihil; Nostromo Pictures
- Distributed by: Lionsgate
- Release date: March 26, 2027
- Country: United States
- Language: English

Day Drinker is an upcoming American supernatural revenge thriller film directed by Marc Webb and written by Zach Dean. It stars Johnny Depp, Madelyn Cline, and Penélope Cruz.

The film is scheduled to be released in the United States on March 26, 2027.

== Premise ==
A private-yacht bartender meets a mysterious day drinker, only for them to be unexpectedly tangled in a criminal underbelly with a toothy twist.

== Cast ==
- Johnny Depp as Kelly
- Madelyn Cline as Lorna
- Penélope Cruz as Cara Lazaro
- Manu Ríos as Floren
- Arón Piper as Rafa
- Juan Diego Botto as Emile
- Anika Boyle
- Javier Botet

== Production ==
In October 2024, it was announced that an action thriller film directed by Marc Webb and written by Zach Dean was in development, with Johnny Depp and Penélope Cruz cast in the lead roles. In February 2025, Madelyn Cline joined the cast. Sydney Sweeney had previously been reported for the part. In April 2025, Manu Ríos, Arón Piper, Juan Diego Botto, and Anika Boyle joined the cast.

Day Drinker is a Thunder Road, IN.2, and Nostromo production. Principal photography began on April 14, 2025, in Spain. Shooting locations in the island of Tenerife included the Auditorio de Tenerife in Santa Cruz. Filming was previously set to commence in February 2025. Filming wrapped by October 2025.

== Release ==
In July 2025, Leone Film Group and Rai Cinema acquired Italian distribution rights to the film from Lionsgate. Diamond Films secured distribution in Spain. In May 2026, Lionsgate scheduled a theatrical release in the United States for March 26, 2027.
