= Minamata (film) =

2020 drama film

- UK theatrical release poster
- Directed by: Andrew Levitas
- Screenplay by: David Kessler
- Based on: Minamata by: Aileen Mioko Smith; Eugene Smith
- Produced by: Johnny Depp; Andrew Levitas; Sam Sarkar; Kevan Van Thompson
- Starring: Johnny Depp; Hiroyuki Sanada; Minami; Jun Kunimura; Ryo Kase; Tadanobu Asano; Bill Nighy
- Cinematography: Benoît Delhomme
- Edited by: Nathan Nugent
- Music by: Ryuichi Sakamoto
- Production companies: Ingenious; Metalwork Pictures; Infinitum Nihil; Wilderness Foundation Global
- Distributed by: Vertigo Releasing (United Kingdom); Iervolino & Lady Bacardi Entertainment Samuel Goldwyn Films (United States)
- Release dates: February 21, 2020 (Berlinale); August 13, 2021 (United Kingdom); February 11, 2022 (United States)
- Running time: 115 minutes
- Countries: United States; United Kingdom
- Languages: English; Japanese
- Box office: $755,878

Minamata is a 2020 biographical drama film directed by Andrew Levitas, based on the book of the same name by Aileen Mioko Smith and W. Eugene Smith. The film stars Johnny Depp (who also produced) as W. Eugene Smith, an American photographer who documented the effects of mercury poisoning on the citizens of Minamata, Kumamoto, Japan. The film premiered at the Berlin International Film Festival on February 21, 2020. It was released in the United States on February 11, 2022, by Samuel Goldwyn Films. At the 94th Academy Awards in 2022, the film ranked third place in the Oscars Fan Favorite contest.

== Plot ==
In 1971, the American photographer W. Eugene Smith, who was famous for his numerous "photographic essays" published in Life, has become a recluse. While on a separate assignment, a passionate Japanese interpreter, Aileen, urges Smith to visit Minamata to photograph and document the disease. Smith is finally convinced to do his best to unmask the devastating effects of corporate greed, an accomplice of the local police and government.

Smith travels to Minamata in Japan to document the devastating effect of mercury poisoning and Minamata disease in coastal communities. This disease is caused by industrial pollution linked to the activities of the chemical company Chisso. Armed with only his Minolta camera against a powerful company, Smith must win the trust of the broken community and find the images that will bring this story to the world. While there, Smith becomes the victim of severe reprisals. He is therefore urgently repatriated to the United States. However, this report will make him an icon of photojournalism.

== Cast ==
- Johnny Depp as W. Eugene Smith
- Akiko Iwase as Masako Matsumura
- Katherine Jenkins as Millie
- Bill Nighy as Robert Hayes
- Minami as Aileen Mioko Smith
- Tadanobu Asano as Tatsuo Matsumura
- Ryo Kase as Kiyoshi
- Hiroyuki Sanada as Mitsuo Yamazaki
- Jun Kunimura as Junichi Nojima
- Yosuke Hosoi as Daiki
- Lily Robinson as Diandra
- Masayoshi Haneda as Enforcer
- Tatsuya Hirano as Bodyguard
- Kenta Ogawa as Patient
- Shunsuke Okubo as Japanese Man
- Koji Ono as Company Man
- Bomber Hurley Smith as Chris Lee
- Kotaro Suzuki as Central Pollution Board Member
- Tatsuya Tagawa as Executive
- Ana Trkulja as Japanese Buddhist at Protest
- Ali Shams Noraei as Mr. Noraei

== Production ==
On October 23, 2018, it was announced that Johnny Depp would star in the drama film as the photojournalist Eugene Smith and the film will be written and directed by Andrew Levitas. Originally slated to be paid $6 million for the role, Depp renegotiated down to $3 million in order to keep the film under-budget.

Filming began in January 2019, with Bill Nighy, Minami Hinase, Hiroyuki Sanada, Tadanobu Asano, Ryo Kase and Jun Kunimura added to the cast. Filming took place in Japan, Serbia and Montenegro.

Japanese composer Ryuichi Sakamoto was hired to write the film's score.

== Release ==
Minamata had its world premiere at the Berlin International Film Festival on February 21, 2020. In October 2020, MGM, through its relaunched American International Pictures banner, acquired distribution rights for the US, Canada, Germany and Switzerland, and Vertigo Releasing acquired UK distribution rights to the film. It was scheduled for release on February 5, 2021 in the US and on February 12, 2021 in the UK, but it was postponed to an unspecified date and to August 13, respectively.

On July 26, 2021, Levitas sent MGM a letter alleging that it had decided to "bury the film" in response to the decline in the public image of Depp, and urging MGM to give the film a wider distribution and promotion. An MGM spokesperson told Deadline, "Minamata continues to be among future AIP releases and at this time, the film's US release date is TBA." On December 1, 2021, Iervolino & Lady Bacardi Entertainment and Samuel Goldwyn Films announced that they had acquired US distribution rights to the film from MGM and were planning to release it on December 15. The release was later pushed back to February 11, 2022.

The city of Minamata, Kumamoto, declined to lend its name as a supporter to a local screening held in August 2021 organized by volunteers, prior to the nationwide release of the film in Japan in September 2021. The city told The Asahi Shimbun that it was uncertain whether the film depicted historical events accurately and was conducive to dispelling discrimination and prejudice against patients. Kumamoto Prefecture, on the other hand, supported the screening.

To date the film has grossed $755,878 worldwide, on a budget of $11 to $13 million.

== Music ==
Minamata: Original Motion Picture Score

Film score by Ryuichi Sakamoto
- Released: July 30, 2021
- Genre: Orchestral
- Length: 62:03
- Label: Milan Records

The film's score was composed by Japanese composer Ryuichi Sakamoto. Minamata's director Andrew Levitas said that "Ryuichi was my dream collaborator – he would be on any film – but on this mission in particular, there could be no one else…The music quite literally needed to represent both the absolute best of humanity as well as the worst…In my opinion, Ryuichi was able to elegantly ride this razor's edge and deliver on this concept entirely".

The soundtrack was released on vinyl on July 30, 2021.

Tracklist:

1. "Minamata Piano Theme" – 2:50
2. "Into Japan" – 2:59
3. "Landscape" – 4:18
4. "The Boy" – 1:10
5. "Chisso Co." – 2:08
6. "Boy and Camera" – 1:35
7. "Hidden Data" – 1:13
8. "Blow Up" – 1:52
9. "Rally and Persuasion" – 1:46
10. "Meeting" – 1:08
11. "Offer" – 5:32
12. "Commitment" – 4:35
13. "Fire" – 2:03
14. "Sharing" – 1:23
15. "Rising" – 1:45
16. "Chisso Gate" – 4:23
17. "Arson Man" – 2:26
18. "Suicide" – 1:47
19. "Mother and Child" – 2:29
20. "Coda" – 5:47
21. "Icon" – 2:16
22. "One Single Voice" (performed by Katherine Jenkins) – 3:57

== Reception ==
On review aggregator Rotten Tomatoes, the film holds an approval rating of 78% based on 74 reviews, with an average rating of 7.3 out of 10. The website's critics consensus reads: "Heartfelt yet jumbled, Minamata pays uneven tribute to a remarkable real-life story better served by the documentary treatment." On Metacritic, the film has a weighted average score of 55 out of 100, based on 16 critics, indicating "mixed or average reviews".

The Washington Post awarded the film two and a half stars out of four stating that "Levitas makes choices that distract from the central crisis. But when he pays attention to the victims, Minamata finally comes into focus". Noel Murray of the Los Angeles Times mentioned that "Taken on its own merits — as an accessible if ahistorical dramatization of an environmental tragedy — Minamata does what it sets out to do very well" describing Depp as "quite good". TheWrap stated that "Moments of connection and the power of photography to tell a story shine through, though there are also instances where the cinematic storytelling becomes a bit heavy-handed" calling Depp's performance as "his most tender, most mature work in years".

The New York Times mentioned that "Minamata is often undermined by its protagonist, whose boorish ways clash with Japanese culture and distract from its central message". The Austin Chronicle reported that "Minamata" was "a rare return to form for Depp", while Brian Tallerico of RogerEbert.com stated that "Minamata is weighed down by self-important direction that loses the human beings in this story by prioritizing the headlines" although he praised Depp's performance by saying that "Leading man Johnny Depp is up to the challenge, and he gives a finely tuned performance here that kind of feels like his first "'old man' turn" awarding the film ultimately two stars out of four.

Peter Debruge of Variety gave Minamata a positive review, calling it "impressive if somewhat less-than-nuanced" and mentioning that "Depp plays it surly throughout, dominating those around him". Peter Bradshaw of The Guardian said that "Minamata is a forthright, heartfelt movie, an old-fashioned 'issue picture' with a worthwhile story to tell about how communities can stand up to overweening corporations and how journalists dedicated to truthful news can help them" awarding the film three out of five stars.

Deborah Young from The Hollywood Reporter wrote that "Director Andrew Levitas and his co-screenwriters dramatize a riveting story using a mass of groan-worthy genre clichés that ill-serve the truth they are trying to recreate". She did give positive remarks about Depp's performance as "he effortlessly captures the bohemian contrariness of the brilliant war photographer Gene Smith as he approaches the end of his career plagued by debts, alcohol, nightmares and disillusionment".

Collider stated that Minamata is "well paced, beautifully filmed and does have an appealing classic feel to it, but it still lacks that spark to propel it from informative to all-consuming" while reporting that Depp "does manage to successfully convey the complexities of Eugene's current headspace and how this assignment unearths his early determination". The Sydney Morning Herald awarded the film four stars out of five stating Depp's performance "is full of grace and grit". Jane Fredbury from The Canberra Times said that "Despite his outsize star profile, Depp manages to be convincing as a war-hardened photojournalist committed to exposing corporate crime, and doesn't distract from the issues", ultimately awarding the film four out of five stars.

Kevin Maher of The Times (UK) awarded Minamata two out of five stars, mentioning that "The professional redemption of Johnny Depp will have to wait".
