= Rick Dugdale =

Canadian film producer

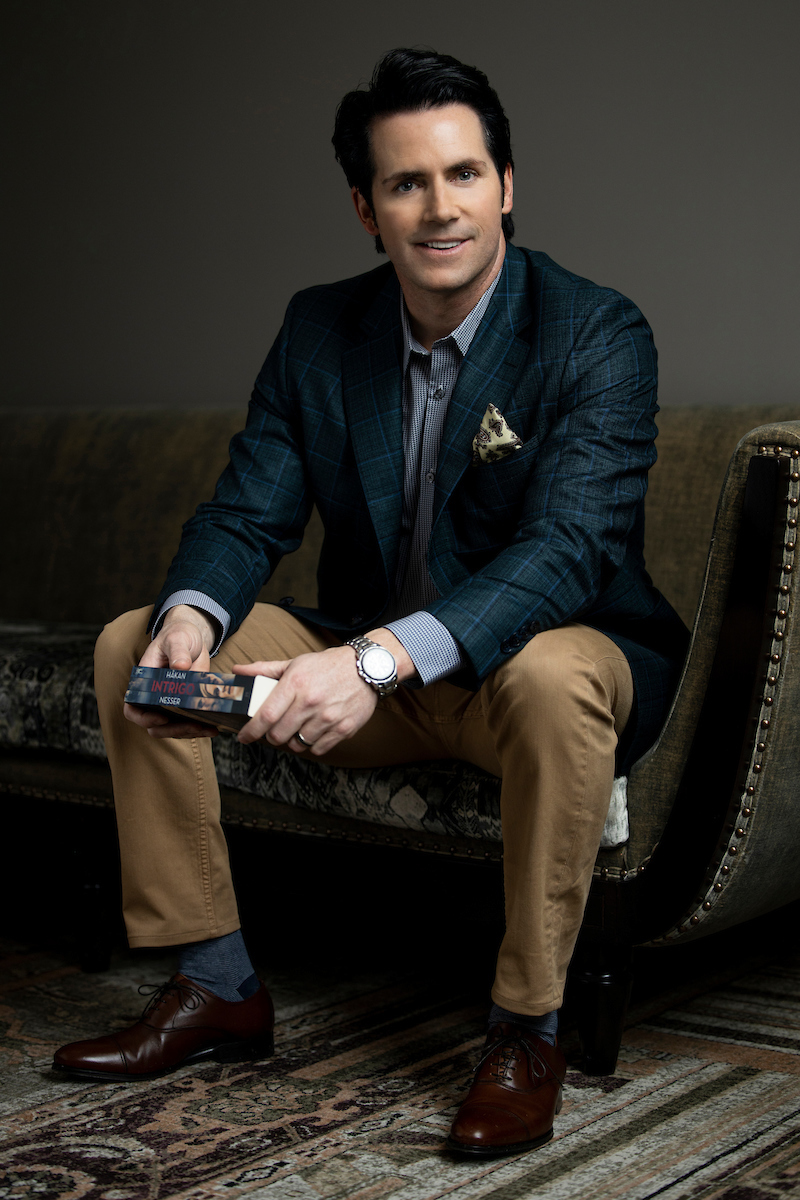
- Rick Dugdale
- Born: Enderby, BC
- Occupations: Film producer, film director
- Years active: 1997–present
- Organization(s): Enderby Entertainment, Vuele

Rick Dugdale is a Canadian film producer and director. He is the president and CEO of Enderby Entertainment, which he co-founded with Daniel Petrie, Jr. in 2006.

== Career ==
Dugdale joined Daniel Petrie, Jr. & Company as vice president of Production in 2003 before becoming a full partner in the company in 2004. He founded Enderby Entertainment with Petrie in 2006. Before his film career, Dugdale worked in financing and investor relations for mining and uranium companies.

Dugdale produced Dawn Patrol (2014) and Rosemont (2015), both directed by Petrie. He also produced About Cherry. For Tony-Seven Films, Enderby Entertainment's genre division, Dugdale was an executive producer of The Speak, Vile, 5 Souls, and A Haunting at Silver Falls: The Return. He produced A Haunting at Silver Falls, No Tell Motel, and Blood Shed.

Dugdale produced and financed the thriller Blackway in 2015. Directed by Daniel Alfredson, it was adapted by Joseph Gangemi and Gregory Jacobs from the novel Go with Me by Castle Freeman Jr. The film premiered at the 72nd Venice International Film Festival before its 2016 release.

In 2017, Dugdale produced the psychological thriller An Ordinary Man, directed by Brad Silberling and starring Ben Kingsley. He also produced Night Hunter, starring Henry Cavill, Kingsley, and Alexandra Daddario.

Dugdale produced the Intrigo trilogy, comprising Intrigo: Death of an Author, Intrigo: Dear Agnes, and Intrigo: Samaria. The films were directed by Alfredson, adapted from works by Håkan Nesser, and filmed in Serbia, Belgium, Croatia, and Slovenia.

Dugdale produced the Second World War action thriller Recon, directed by Robert Port. It premiered at the 2019 Austin Film Festival and was released in the United States in 2020.

In 2020, during the COVID-19 pandemic, Dugdale directed and produced Zero Contact, his feature directorial debut. He remotely supervised filming in 17 countries, with actors' homes serving as sets. Starring Anthony Hopkins, the film was released internationally through Vuele in 2021 and in the United States by Lionsgate Films in 2022. Dugdale co-founded Vuele as a joint venture between Enderby Entertainment and CurrencyWorks.

In 2020, Enderby and the technology company Draganfly launched Safe Set Solutions, which provided screening and on-set measures for film and television productions during the pandemic.

Dugdale was an executive producer of Fool's Paradise and the documentary Mediha in 2023. He subsequently served as an executive producer of Longing and Crescent City in 2024, produced Wish You Were Here in 2025, and was an executive producer of Turbulence.

In 2012, the Austin Film Festival added the Enderby Entertainment Award to its screenplay competition, with finalists and winners selected by Dugdale and Petrie. The partnership later expanded to include the Enderby Entertainment Filmmaking Fellowship, open to submissions in the festival's Narrative Short and Narrative Student Short competitions.

== Membership ==
Dugdale is a member of the Producers Guild of America and Directors Guild of Canada.

== Filmography ==
Year	Film	Role
2011	The Speak	Executive producer
2011	Vile	Executive producer
2012	About Cherry	Producer
2012	No Tell Motel	Producer
2013	5 Souls	Executive producer
2013	A Haunting at Silver Falls	Producer
2014	Blood Shed	Producer
2014	Dawn Patrol	Producer
2015	Blackway	Producer
2015	Rosemont	Producer
2017	An Ordinary Man	Producer
2018	Intrigo: Death of an Author	Producer
2018	Night Hunter	Producer
2019	A Haunting at Silver Falls: The Return	Executive producer
2019	Intrigo: Dear Agnes	Producer
2019	Intrigo: Samaria	Producer
2019	Recon	Producer
2021	Zero Contact	Director and producer
2023	Fool's Paradise	Executive producer
2023	Mediha	Executive producer
2024	Crescent City	Executive producer
2024	Longing	Executive producer
2025	Wish You Were Here	Producer
2025	Turbulence	Executive producer
