= Intrigo: Samaria =

2019 mystery crime drama film

- Film poster
- Directed by: Daniel Alfredson
- Written by: Daniel Alfredson; Birgitta Bongenhielm
- Produced by: Rick Dugdale; Thomas Peter Friedl; Uwe Schott
- Starring: Phoebe Fox; Andrew Buchan; Jeff Fahey
- Cinematography: Paweł Edelman
- Edited by: Håkan Karlsson
- Music by: Anders Niska; Klas Wahl
- Production companies: Enderby Entertainment; The Amazing Film Company; Umedia; Seine Pictures
- Distributed by: 20th Century Fox (Germany); Lionsgate (United States)
- Release date: October 10, 2019
- Running time: 104 minutes
- Countries: Germany; Sweden; United States
- Language: English

Intrigo: Samaria is a 2019 German-Swedish-American mystery crime drama film directed by Daniel Alfredson and starring Phoebe Fox, Andrew Buchan and Jeff Fahey. It is the third of a trilogy preceded by Intrigo: Death of an Author (2018) and Intrigo: Dear Agnes (2019).

== Plot ==
While cycling late night, 19-year-old Vera Kall arrives at a farm. She leaves her bike and sneaks quietly in through a kitchen door. She hadn't had time to realize that she is not alone, when a sudden blow to the head knocks her onto the kitchen floor where she is left lying. Meanwhile, a successful copywriter at Antwerp, Henry, is approached by Paula, a documentarian, with whom, upon talking, revealed that she once studied with Vera. Her task is to make a film about Vera Kall, and she wants Henry's help in writing a script for it, while she will travel to Münster and start filming. At the same time, Vera's father, Jakob, is convicted in her murder and sent to prison. Paula and Henry team up to unravel the truth and why and where Vera's body disappeared, while at the same time try to hide the whereabouts.

== Cast ==
- Phoebe Fox as Paula
- Andrew Buchan as Henry
- Millie Brady as Vera
- Jeff Fahey as Jacob
- Jack Brett Anderson as Fritz Neller
- Dan Cade as John
- Cal MacAninch as Erich Neumann-Hansen
- Tracy Wiles as Monica Kall
- Ann Firbank as Irma Kuentzer
- Skye Hallam as Claire Meitens
- Tor Clark as Doris
- Angela Kostic as Beatrice Motte
- Nick Wilton as Harry Fletcher
- Luka Peroš as client
- Dan Cade as John
- Katerina Tana as Elisa
- Josephine Butler as Susanne Liebermann
- Bob Goody as Kruggel
- Nenad Pavlovic as Kellerman
- Jovan Gulan as Pieter Vogel
- Marko Gvero as cleaner
- Michael Moreland as estate agent
- William Dugdale as Stephan
- Jaka Petric as Bernt Staaf
- Gasper Duhovnik as Kim Larsen
- Jaka Dolinar as Chris von Hausswolf
- Danijel Simon as Tom Kusoffsky

== Reception ==
Jeffrey M. Anderson of Common Sense Media awarded the film two stars out of five.
