= List of alternative colleges and universities =

An alternative college or university is one that offers an education, and in some cases a lifestyle, that is intentionally not mainstream compared to other institutions. Through the use of experimental and unconventional curricula and offering choice to students as to what and how they will study, such institutions distinguish themselves from traditional faculties. Some of them expand on the concept of democratic education to integrate students in various facets of school administration. Methods of evaluation frequently favor detailed narrative evaluations instead of grades. Some institutions do not require an SAT/ACT, but rather ask for a series of essays. Many of these institutions are private, though most offer scholarships, grants, and other aid.

== United States ==
The following are sourced from the Alternative Education Resource Organization (AERO) and the Consortium for Innovative Environments in Learning (CIEL).

List from AERO:

- Alverno College, Milwaukee, Wisconsin
- Antioch College, located in Yellow Springs, Ohio
- Bard College, located in Annandale-on-Hudson, New York
- Bennington College, located in Bennington, Vermont
- Berea College, located in Berea, Kentucky
- California Institute of Integral Studies, located in San Francisco, CA
- College of the Atlantic, located on Mount Desert Island in Bar Harbor, Maine
- Deep Springs College, located in California's Deep Springs Valley
- Dharma Realm Buddhist University, located in Ukiah, California
- Evergreen State College, located in Olympia, Washington
- ~~Hampshire College, located in Amherst, Massachusetts~~ (closed)
- Maharishi University of Management, located in Fairfield, Iowa
- Naropa University, located in Boulder, Colorado
- The New School-Eugene Lang College, New York City, New York
- Prescott College, located in Prescott, Arizona
- Reed College, located in Portland, Oregon.
- Sarah Lawrence College, located in Yonkers, New York
- St. John's College — Annapolis, Maryland
- St. John's College — Santa Fe, New Mexico
- University of Redlands in Redlands, California-Johnston Center for Integrative Studies (formerly Johnston College)
- Warren Wilson College, located in Asheville, North Carolina
- Western Washington University - Fairhaven College, Bellingham, Washington

List from CIEL:

- Bennington College, located in Bennington, Vermont
- Evergreen State College, located in Olympia, Washington
- ~~Hampshire College, located in Amherst, Massachusetts~~ (closed)
- Pitzer College, located in Claremont, California
- Prescott College, located in Prescott, Arizona
- University of Alabama, New College, located in Tuscaloosa, Alabama
- University of Redlands in Redlands, California-Johnston Center for Integrative Studies (formerly Johnston College)
- Western Washington University - Fairhaven College, Bellingham, Washington

== See also ==
- Colleges That Change Lives
