= Daniel Petrie Jr. =

American film director (born 1951)

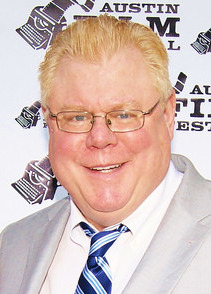
- Petrie in 2014
- Born: Daniel Mannix Petrie Jr. November 30, 1951 (age 74); Canada
- Education: Johnston College
- Occupations: Film producer Screenwriter; Film director
- Years active: 1984–present
- Organization(s): Writers Guild of America, West; Academy of Motion Picture Arts and Sciences; Directors Guild of America; Directors Guild of Canada; Academy of Canadian Cinema and Television
- Parent(s): Daniel Petrie; Dorothea G. Petrie
- Relatives: Donald Petrie
- Awards: WGA Morgan Cox Award

Daniel Mannix Petrie Jr. (born November 30, 1951) is a Canadian-American producer, writer, and director of film and television. He is best known for pioneering the sub-genres of action comedy and buddy cop films through films like Beverly Hills Cop and Turner & Hooch. He served as President of the Writers Guild of America, West between 1997 and 1999, and then again between 2004 and 2005. He currently serves as the President of the Board of Directors at the Writers Guild Foundation.

== Life and career ==
Petrie was born in Canada to Daniel Petrie Sr., a film director, and Dorothea, a producer, novelist, and actress. He attended Northfield Mount Hermon School and Johnston College, earning degrees in psychology and creative writing. Originally a literary agent, he followed in his father's footsteps and joined the film industry as a screenwriter. His debut screenplay, Beverly Hills Cop, was the result of numerous rewrites and several radically different iterations over the course of a decade.

At one point, the film was a serious action film starring Sylvester Stallone, a project that Stallone later took with him and developed into Cobra. Despite the troubled production history, the film was a massive critical and financial success, grossing over $300 million worldwide from a $15 million budget and earning rave reviews from critics like Janet Maslin and Richard Schickel. In spite of much of the film's comedy having been improvised by the actors, Petrie's contributions earned him accolades in the form of Academy Award and Edgar Award nominations.

Petrie wrote a number of well-known and well-received films throughout the 1980s and 1990s, including the off-beat crime thriller The Big Easy starring Dennis Quaid and Ellen Barkin. He wrote two films for director Roger Spottiswoode, the 1988 thriller film Shoot to Kill and the Tom Hanks comedy Turner & Hooch, and produced a third, The 6th Day. Much of his work falls under the umbrella of crime fiction. He made his directorial debut with Toy Soldiers, a 1991 action film revolving around a group of teenagers fighting terrorists that have taken over their prep school. He served as the creator and executive producer of Combat Hospital, a television war drama series produced in his native Canada.

In addition to his creative pursuits, Petrie has been active in various entertainment industry organizations. He served as Vice President, and later President, of the Writers Guild of America, West, and currently sits on its Board of Trustees. He also served as a member of the Board of Trustees for the American Film Institute; a member of the Board of Governors for the Academy of Motion Picture Arts and Sciences; and as a member of the Board of Advisers of the Austin Film Festival and Screenwriting Conference. He is co-founder of Enderby Entertainment, an independent film finance and production company.

== Filmography ==
=== Film ===
Year	Title	Director	Writer	Producer
1984	Beverly Hills Cop	No	Yes	No
1986	The Big Easy	No	Yes	No
1988	Shoot to Kill	No	Yes	Yes
1989	Turner & Hooch	No	Yes	Executive
1991	Toy Soldiers	Yes	Yes	No
1994	In the Army Now	Yes	Yes	No
2014	Dawn Patrol	Yes	No	Yes
2015	Rosemont	Yes	No	Yes

Executive producer only

- Kangaroo Court (1994) (Short film)
- The 6th Day (2000)
- No Tell Motel (2013)
- A Haunting at Silver Falls (2013)
- Blood Shed (2013)
- Blackway (2015)
- An Ordinary Man (2017)
- Intrigo: Death of an Author (2018)
- A Haunting at Silver Falls 2 (2019)
- Intrigo: Dear Agnes (2019)
- Intrigo: Samaria (2019)
- Zero Contact (TBA)
- Fire Watch (TBA)

Acting credits

Year	Title	Role
1992	The Distinguished Gentleman	Asbestos Lobbyist
1994	In the Army Now	Lieutenant Colonel

=== Television ===
Year	Title	Writer	Executive Producer	Notes
1995	Stick with Me, Kid	No	Yes	10 episodes
1996-1997	The Big Easy	No	Yes	23 episodes
2011	Combat Hospital	Yes	Yes	Creator and producer in 13 episodes; writer in 2 episodes

TV movies

Year	Title	Director	Writer	Executive Producer	Notes
1990	Turner & Hooch	No	No	Yes	
1996	Toe Tags	Yes	No	No	
1997	Dead Silence	Yes	No	No	Cameo as "Slaughterhouse Trooper"
2002	Framed	Yes	Yes	No	
2007	Pictures of Hollis Woods	No	Yes	No	

== Personal life ==
Petrie's father Daniel Petrie was also a film director, and his brother Donald is an actor and director. His family was awarded an AFI Lifetime Achievement Award in 2001. He currently resides in Los Angeles, California, and holds dual US-Canadian citizenship. He is a member of the Writers Guild of America, Directors Guild of America, SAG-AFTRA, Writers Guild of Canada, Academy of Canadian Cinema & Television, and the Academy of Motion Picture Arts and Sciences.

== Awards and nominations ==
1984 Academy Award for Best Original Screenplay: Beverly Hills Cop (nomination) - with Danilo Bach

1984 Edgar Award for Best Motion Picture: Beverly Hills Cop (nomination)

1988 Edgar Award for Best Motion Picture: Shoot to Kill (nomination)

2008 Humanitas Prize in 90 Minute Category: Pictures of Hollis Woods (nomination) - with Ann Peacock and Camille Thomasson

2013 WGA Morgan Cox Award (won)
