= Educational consultant =

Advisor who helps parents and students

An educational consultant (EC), sometimes referred to as an independent educational consultant (IEC), is an advisor who helps parents and either traditional students or non-traditional students with educational planning for college and graduate school. Some also work with independent school students.

== Overview ==
An educational consultant offers services that are similar to school counselors and academic advisors, but is normally self-employed or employed by a larger educational organization. A standard title is "IEC" or "independent educational consultant".

According to the National Association of Independent Schools, an educational consultant is someone who can: "assess [a] child's talents, learning style, and ideal learning environment," "explain the different types of schools and which students each school serves best," "identify schools that fit [a] student's needs," "gauge whether a particular school is right for [a] child," "explain the application process, calendar, and deadlines," "help [students and families] prepare for campus visits, admission tests, and interviews," "offer advice and support throughout the admissions process."

=== Ethics ===
IECA's "Ethical Guidelines for the Profession of Educational Consulting" states that it "has developed a strict set of ethical guidelines that govern the actions of consultants in their relationships with students and families, schools and colleges, and with colleagues. These include a responsibility to understand each student's special strengths, values and needs, while striving to include all family members in the educational planning process. An IECA member does not accept any compensation from educational institutions for placement of a child. All IECA members subscribe to these Principles of Good Practice and all IECA members are required to annually sign and follow the principles as part of their Association membership in good standing." HECA has also set a "Standard and Ethics" policy for all HECA members.

== Professional organizations ==
The two main professional organizations for educational consultants are the IECA (Independent Educational Consultants Association) and HECA (Higher Education Consultants Association). The primary association in the UK is the Society of Education Consultants (SEC).

== See also ==
- Loren Pope - educational consultant and author of Colleges That Change Lives.
- The Hidden Ivies by educational consultants Howard and Matthew Greene.
