= The Trenton Pickle Ordinance and Other Bonehead Legislation =

- First edition
- Author: Dick Hyman
- Language: English
- Subjects: Law
- Publisher: The Stephen Greene Press
- Publication date: April 1976
- Publication place: United States
- Media type: Print (Hardcover), e-book at Internet Archive
- Pages: 116 pp.
- ISBN: 0-8289-0278-X

The Trenton Pickle Ordinance and Other Bonehead Legislation is a 116-page book published in 1976 and written by Dick Hyman (1904-1995), a newspaper and magazine columnist and feature writer from New York City. The book includes a posthumously published foreword by Bob Considine and publisher's note by Castle Freeman Jr. The book is a collection of humorous one-sentence summaries of six-hundred unusual ordinances and laws (organized alphabetically by general topic) which the author reports he had gathered from across the United States over the preceding forty years before publication of the book. The book's name comes from one of the unusual ordinances: "A Trenton, New Jersey, ordinance states that it is unlawful to throw any tainted pickles in the streets."
