= Kelsey Grammer =

American actor (born 1955)

- Grammer in 2026
- Born: Allen Kelsey Grammer; February 21, 1955 (age 71); Saint Thomas, U.S. Virgin Islands
- Occupation: Actor • comedian
- Years active: 1977–present
- Political party: Republican
- Spouses: Doreen Alderman (m. 1982; div. 1990); Leigh-Anne Csuhany (m. 1992; ann. 1993); Camille Donatacci (m. 1997; div. 2011); Kayte Walsh (m. 2011)
- Children: 8, including Spencer and Greer
- Awards: Hollywood Walk of Fame

Allen Kelsey Grammer (born February 21, 1955) is an American actor and comedian. He gained fame for his role as the Harvard-educated Boston psychiatrist Dr. Frasier Crane on the NBC sitcom Cheers (1984–1993) and its spin-off Frasier (1993–2004, and again from 2023–2024). With more than 20 years on air, this is one of the longest-running roles played by a single live-action actor in primetime television history. He has received numerous accolades including a total of six Emmy Awards, three Golden Globe Awards, two Satellite Awards, two People's Choice Awards, a Screen Actors Guild Award and a Tony Award.

Grammer, having trained as an actor at Juilliard and the Old Globe Theatre, made his professional acting debut as Lennox in the 1981 Broadway revival of Macbeth. The following year, he portrayed Cassio acting opposite Christopher Plummer and James Earl Jones in Othello. In mid-1983, he acted alongside Mandy Patinkin in the original off-Broadway production of Stephen Sondheim's musical Sunday in the Park with George. He has since starred in the leading roles in productions of Sweeney Todd: The Demon Barber of Fleet Street, My Fair Lady, Big Fish, and Finding Neverland.

In film, he is known for his role as Dr. Hank McCoy / Beast in the superhero films X-Men: The Last Stand (2006), X-Men: Days of Future Past (2014), The Marvels (2023) and Avengers: Doomsday (2026). His other roles include Down Periscope (1996), The Pentagon Wars (1998), and Swing Vote (2008). He is also known for his voice roles in Anastasia (1997), Toy Story 2 (1999), and as Sideshow Bob in The Simpsons (1990–present). He took guest roles in the sitcoms 30 Rock (2010–2012), Unbreakable Kimmy Schmidt (2016), and Modern Family (2017). For his performance as the corrupt mayor in the Starz political series Boss (2011–2012), he received a Golden Globe Award for Best Actor – Television Series Drama.

In early 2010, Grammer returned to Broadway in the musical revival of La Cage aux Folles, where he received a nomination for the Tony Award for Best Leading Actor in a Musical. In mid-2016, Grammer won a Tony Award for Best Musical as producer of a musical revival of The Color Purple. In early 2019, he starred as Don Quixote in a production of Man of La Mancha at the London Coliseum. In late 2023, The Telegraph described Grammer as one of "the finest actors" of his generation. He was awarded a star on the Hollywood Walk of Fame on May 22, 2001.

== Early life, family and education ==
Allen Kelsey Grammer was born on February 21, 1955 in Saint Thomas, U.S. Virgin Islands. Grammer's mother, Sally Cranmer (1928–2008), was a dancer who performed under the name of Sally Sullivan. His father, Frank Allen Grammer Jr., was a musician who owned a coffee shop, Greer's Place; he also owned and edited a magazine, Virgin Islands View. Kelsey had a younger sister, Karen, and four half-siblings from his father's second marriage.

Grammer's personal life has been shaped by many family tragedies. Following his parents' divorce, Grammer was raised in New Jersey by his mother and maternal grandparents, Gordon and Evangeline Cranmer. The family later relocated to Pompano Beach, Florida. When Grammer was twelve years old, his grandfather died of cancer. In 1968, his father was murdered in Saint Thomas during a wave of racial violence following the assassination of Martin Luther King Jr. In 1975, his sister was kidnapped, raped, and murdered in Colorado Springs, Colorado, by spree killer Freddie Glenn. In 1980, his two teenage half-brothers died in a scuba diving accident.

Grammer attended Pine Crest School, a private preparatory school in Fort Lauderdale, Florida. It was there that he first began to sing and perform on stage. Grammer later won a scholarship to study drama at the Juilliard School, where he was a member of Group 6 from 1973 to 1975. However, after his sister's murder, Grammer failed to attend classes and was eventually expelled.

Grammer described himself as "a Caribbean kid", and he enjoys vacationing in the Bahamas, the US Virgin Islands, and British Virgin Islands.

== Career ==
=== 1977–1983: Theatre work and early roles ===
After leaving Juilliard, Grammer had a three-year internship with the Old Globe Theatre in San Diego in the late 1970s before a stint in 1980 at the Guthrie Theater in Minneapolis. Grammer acted as the Burglar in the LA production of the George Bernard Shaw play Too True to Be Good in 1977. In 1980, he starred in the Roundabout Theatre Company's production of A Month in the Country. He made his Broadway debut in 1981 as "Lennox" in Macbeth, taking the lead role when Philip Anglim withdrew after receiving negative reviews. Grammer then played Michael Cassio in the 1982 Broadway revival of Othello, alongside Christopher Plummer and James Earl Jones. That same year he portrayed Codename Lazar in the Public Theatre production of the David Hare play Plenty. In 1983, he performed in the demo of the Stephen Sondheim–James Lapine production Sunday in the Park with George, starring Mandy Patinkin.

=== 1984–1993: Breakthrough with Cheers ===
In 1984, Grammer first appeared as Dr. Frasier Crane in the NBC sitcom Cheers. Grammer's Broadway co-star and former Juilliard classmate, Mandy Patinkin, suggested Grammer to the New York casting director. He was supposed to appear for only six episodes, but ended up as a regular cast member. The character of Frasier first appears in the third season and continues to appear until the final season of the series in May 1993. Frasier Crane also had a crossover appearance in the 1992 Wings episode "Planes, Trains, & Visiting Cranes".

Grammer has provided the voice of Sideshow Bob on The Simpsons, starting in the 1990 episode "Krusty Gets Busted". He won a fifth Emmy Award for his work in the episode "The Italian Bob". Bob has appeared in twenty-three episodes of the show, the most recent being 2024's "The Yellow Lotus".

From April to June 1992, he played the title role in Richard II, staged at the Mark Taper Forum at the Los Angeles Music Center.

=== 1993–2004: Stardom and acclaim with Frasier ===
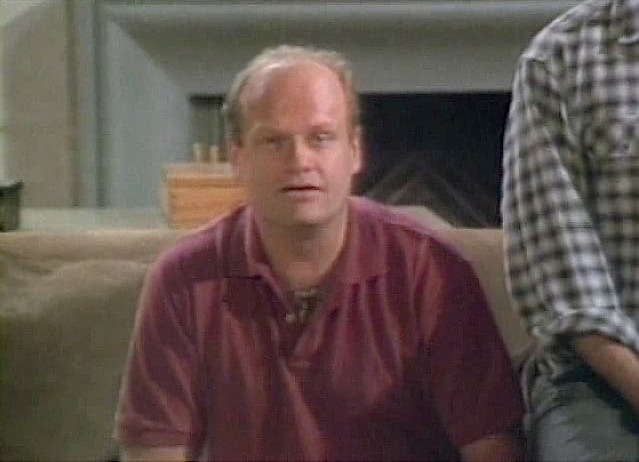
Grammer as Frasier Crane in 1996

In September 1993, the character became the protagonist of spin-off Frasier. In the show, Frasier has moved from Boston to Seattle and works as a radio psychiatrist alongside his producer Roz (Peri Gilpin). In addition to starring, Grammer also directed more than 30 episodes, and sang the closing theme "Tossed Salads and Scrambled Eggs". In 2001, he negotiated a $700,000-per-episode salary for Frasier. The show was nominated for, and won, numerous awards during its 11-year run, concluding in May 2004. The show met instant success, and received five Primetime Emmy Awards for Outstanding Comedy Series. This record has never been broken, with Modern Family tying the record. Grammer himself received 10 Primetime Emmy Award nominations for his role in Frasier, winning four times, tying him with Carroll O'Connor, Michael J. Fox and Jim Parsons for the most wins for Primetime Emmy Award for Best Actor in a Comedy Series. His 20-year run playing Dr. Frasier Crane (in both Cheers and Frasier) ties a length set by James Arness in playing Marshal Matt Dillon on Gunsmoke from 1955 to 1975, but it was surpassed by Richard Belzer in playing Det. John Munch on Homicide: Life on the Street and Law & Order: Special Victims Unit since 1993. Then, in February 2021, it was announced that Grammer would reprise the character in a revival set to air on the streaming service Paramount+.

In 1995, Grammer voiced Dr. Frankenollie in the Mickey Mouse short Runaway Brain, and it was nominated for Academy Award for Best Animated Short Film. He later starred in the lead role as Lt. Commander Thomas "Tom" Dodge in the film Down Periscope (1996), and voiced Vladimir "Vlad" Vasilovich in the 20th Century Fox's critically acclaimed animated movie Anastasia (1997). In 1999, Grammer voiced the main antagonist Stinky Pete in Pixar's Golden Globe Award-winning Toy Story 2 (1999). He also provided voice work for several other animated television series and direct-to-video films, such as Barbie of Swan Lake, Bartok the Magnificent, the title character in the short-lived animated series Gary the Rat, and the narrator of Mickey's Once Upon a Christmas. He also voiced Dr. Ivan Krank in Disney's Teacher's Pet (2004). In 2004, he played Ebenezer Scrooge in the musical television film A Christmas Carol.

Grammer's voice has been featured in many commercials. In 1998, he appeared in a commercial for Honey Nut Cheerios, where he voices the wolf in Little Red Riding Hood. Since 2006, Grammer has provided the voice for television commercials advertising Hyundai. In 2008, Grammer reprised his role of Dr. Frasier Crane in a commercial for Dr Pepper (Frasier and Cheers co-star Bebe Neuwirth also reprised her role as Lilith Sternin in the same commercial, albeit in voice only). In 2000, Grammer again played Macbeth on Broadway, in a production that closed after only 10 days.

=== 2005–present: Continued acclaim ===
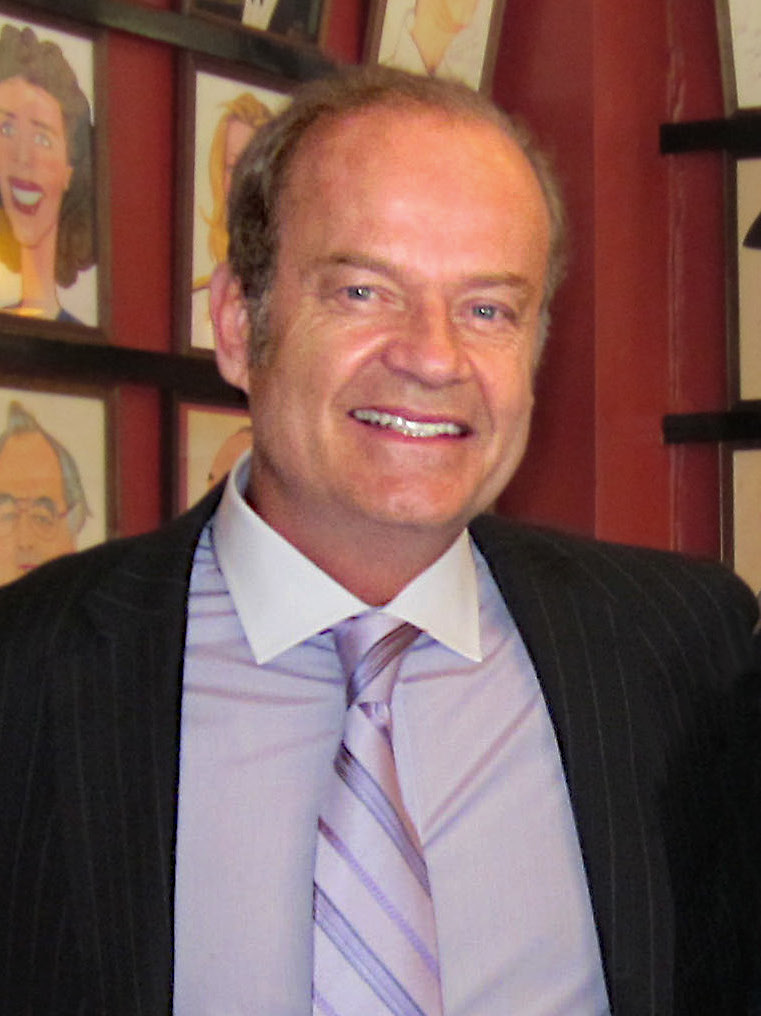
Kelsey Grammer at the Drama League Awards in early 2010

In 2005, Grammer produced an American adaptation of the British show The Sketch Show, which aired on Fox. The main cast consisted of Malcolm Barrett, Kaitlin Olson, Mary Lynn Rajskub and Paul F. Tompkins, as well as Lee Mack from the British version of the show. Grammer appeared in only short opening and closing segments in each episode. Many of the sketches from the British version were re-created. Only six episodes of the show were made, and it was cancelled after just four of them had aired. In 2007, Grammer starred with Patricia Heaton in the American sitcom Back to You, which Fox cancelled after its first season. His next lead role, ABC's Hank, was cancelled after only five episodes had aired. Grammer later commented, "Honestly, it just wasn't very funny."

On April 18, 2010, Grammer made his Broadway musical debut playing the role of Georges in a revival of the Jerry Herman/Harvey Fierstein musical La Cage aux Folles at the Longacre Theatre. Grammer starred alongside Douglas Hodge for which they both were nominated for Tony Awards for Best Performance by a Leading Actor in a Musical. Grammer was said to have been "delivering an assured and charming leading turn." In 2011 and 2012, Grammer found temporary success in the Starz drama series Boss as a fictional mayor of Chicago, based on former mayor Richard J. Daley. It premiered in October 2011. It was his first dramatic TV series. At the 2012 Golden Globe Awards Grammer won the award for Best Actor in a Television Series Drama for his role. The show ran for 18 episodes over two seasons. From 2010 to 2012, Grammer guest starred as a comical version of himself in three episodes of the NBC show 30 Rock alongside Jane Krakowski and Jack McBrayer.

In 2011, he was originally announced to provide the voice of Henry J. Waternoose III in the prequel to Monsters, Inc., Monsters University, and he was meant to replace James Coburn, following Coburn's death in 2002. The character, however, got cut from the film.

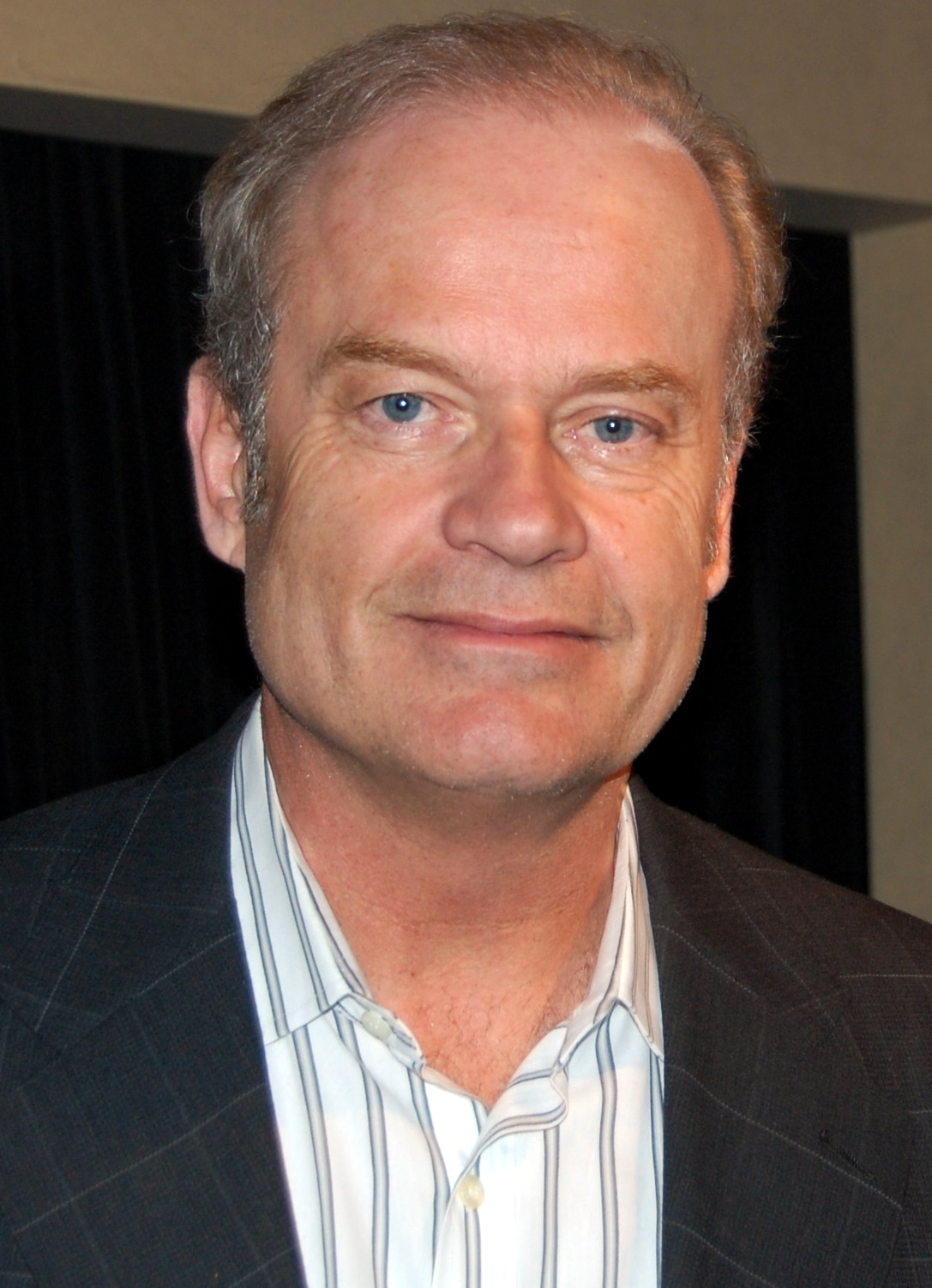
Grammer in mid-2010

In 2014, Grammer came back to sitcom television when he appeared in Partners with comedian Martin Lawrence. The Lionsgate-produced show was written and executive produced by Robert L. Boyett and Robert Horn, known for writing hit shows like Family Matters, Living Single, Full House, Designing Women, and Perfect Strangers. Despite this, the show was cancelled after its first season. Later that same year, Grammer starred in several films such as Bonaparte in The Expendables 3 (2014) and as Harold Attinger in Transformers: Age of Extinction (2014). He appeared as both the narrator and Herod the Great, in the National Geographic TV film Killing Jesus. In 2015, Grammer and John Lithgow lent their voices to the critically acclaimed documentary Best of Enemies as William F. Buckley Jr. and Gore Vidal, respectively. The documentary surrounds the events around the televised debates between intellectuals Vidal and Buckley during the 1968 United States presidential election. The film premiered at the 2015 Sundance Film Festival and was shortlisted for the Academy Award for Best Documentary but did not make the final cut.

In March 2015, Grammer originated the roles of Charles Frohman and Captain Hook in the Broadway premiere of the musical Finding Neverland, continuing with the roles through June. In February 2016 he made an appearance in the West End production of Big Fish. In 2016, Grammer won a Tony Award as a producer of The Color Purple. In 2019, Grammer starred as Don Quixote in a production of Man of La Mancha at the London Coliseum. That same year he starred as Harry Hamilton in the Netflix film Like Father (2018), alongside Kristen Bell, and as a detective opposite Nicolas Cage in Grand Isle (2019).

Grammer reprised his role as Frasier Crane in the 2023 revival of Frasier on Paramount+. The show was renewed for a second season with Peri Gilpin from the original series returning for a recurring role. Grammer reprised his role as Dr. Hank McCoy / Beast in the Marvel Cinematic Universe (MCU) film The Marvels (2023) during a post-credits scene. It was announced in 2025 that Grammer would also reprise the role in the upcoming MCU film Avengers: Doomsday (2026). In 2025, Grammer hosted the "Smiles Under the Stars" charity gala for the Giving A Smile Foundation.

== Personal life ==
=== Relationships and children ===
Grammer has been married four times and has eight children and one grandchild. His first marriage, to dance instructor Doreen Alderman, lasted from 1982 to 1990, although they were separated for the last six years of that period. They have one daughter, actress Spencer Grammer (born October 9, 1983). Through Spencer, Grammer has one grandson, born on October 10, 2011.

After his divorce from Alderman, Grammer had a daughter, Kandace Greer Grammer (born February 15, 1992), with hair and makeup stylist Barrie Buckner. Greer was later a cast member on MTV show Awkward. Greer has said she was estranged from her father from age four through sixteen, when they reconnected by chance.

His second marriage, to Leigh-Anne Csuhany in September 1992, lasted one year. When Csuhany was three months pregnant, Grammer filed for an annulment and evicted her from their home; Grammer claimed she was abusive and fired a gun at him. The pregnancy ended in a miscarriage.

In 1994, he met 28-year-old Tammi Baliszewski at a bar in Manhattan Beach, California. In December 1994, they appeared together on the cover of People magazine, announcing their engagement and Grammer's substance abuse problems.

In August 1997, Grammer married dancer and model Camille Donatacci. They had met on a blind date in 1996. They have a daughter, born 2001, and a son, born 2004, both children through surrogacy. During their marriage, several of Grammer and Donatacci's homes were featured in magazines, including ones in Malibu (February 2001, InStyle), Maui (May 2004, InStyle), Long Island (April 2008, InStyle), Bachelor Gulch (Architectural Digest), and Bel Air, Los Angeles (Architectural Digest). In New York City, they lived at 15 Central Park West. On July 1, 2010, it was announced that Camille had filed for divorce. The pair's divorce was finalized on February 10, 2011.

On August 12, 2010, Grammer announced that he was going to be a father to a fifth child, this time with his girlfriend, Kayte Walsh, an English flight attendant 25 years his junior and daughter of former soccer player Alan Walsh. In October, Grammer announced that Walsh had miscarried six weeks earlier. The couple announced their engagement in December 2010 and married at the Plaza Hotel in New York City on February 25, 2011, two weeks after the dissolution of Grammer's third marriage. Grammer and Walsh have a daughter, born July 2012, and two sons, born July 2014 and November 2016. On January 18, 2023, it was reported that Grammer had purchased a house in his wife's hometown of Portishead, Somerset, England. In October 2025, Walsh gave birth to their fourth child together, a son, who is Grammer's eighth child.

=== Faith ===
In 2001, Grammer described himself as religious and stated that he believed in God but added that he did not adhere to any particular religion. In 2023, Grammer said he considered himself a born-again follower of Jesus. He said, "What I found in my life – with the sort of resident malaise that lives in my soul because of some of the things that happened – I have found that in those moments, Jesus is actually more present, more apparent, more readily available than I realised." Grammer said he came to that conclusion when he was standing on a baseball field a while ago and asked God: "Where were you?" "The answer came: 'I was right there.' I do think that when things are at their worst, that's when Christ is closest." He added that his views in some areas are in line with progressive Christianity.

=== Murder of Karen Grammer ===
On July 1, 1975, Grammer's younger sister, 18-year-old Karen Grammer, was raped and murdered by Freddie Glenn and three other men. Grammer identified his sister's body and informed their mother about her death. According to Grammer, his bouts of alcoholism and drug abuse were driven in part by guilt and depression over his sister's death, as the pair had been close during childhood.

In a 2012 interview with Oprah Winfrey, Grammer said he would be willing to forgive his sister's murderers if they took responsibility for the crime; however, the accused perpetrators all claimed innocence. In the same interview, Grammer expressed his loss of faith for several years after Karen's death. He subsequently forgave Glenn in a 2014 parole hearing after being convinced of Glenn's contrition but refused to support Glenn's release, saying it would "be a betrayal of my sister's life". He named his daughter Spencer Karen Grammer in part for his sister.

Karen Grammer's murder and the investigation by the Colorado Springs Police Department was the subject of the episode "Animal Nature" of the Investigation Discovery series Homicide Hunter.

Grammer's 2025 book Karen: A Brother Remembers is about his sister's life and murder and their effects on his life.

=== Politics ===
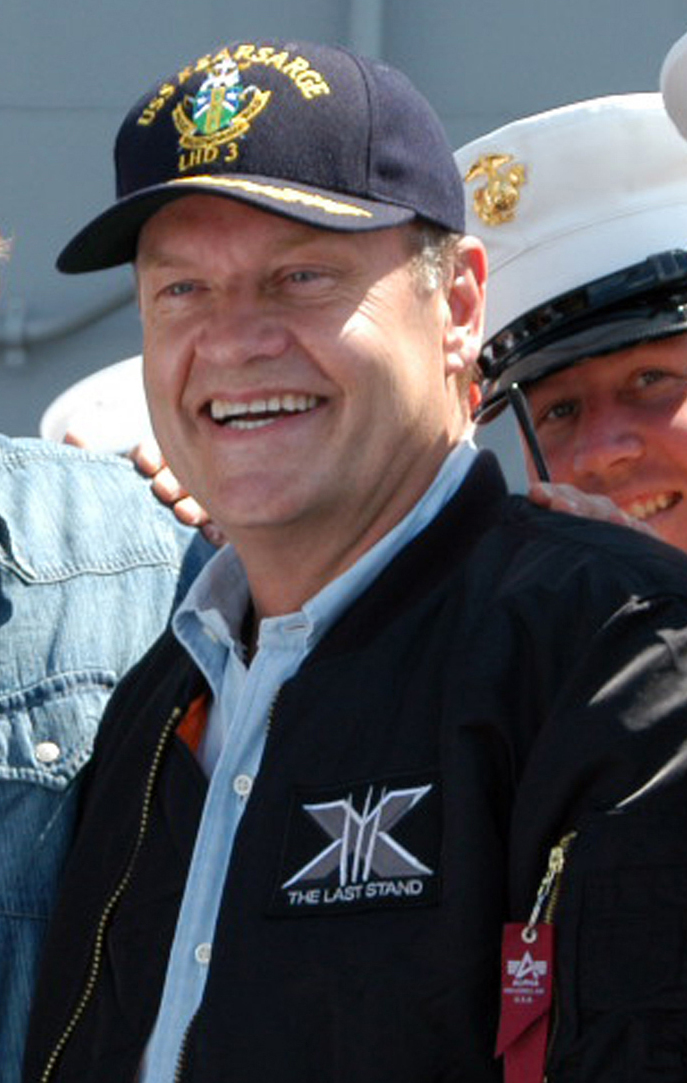
Grammer during Fleet Week in New York City, in May 2006

Grammer has been a longtime supporter of the Republican Party, and he endorsed the Tea Party movement on economic issues such as small government and lower taxes; City A.M. described him as "one of Hollywood's best-known Republicans, a rare spark of red in a blue sea of Democrats".

A New York magazine profile published in 2010 described Grammer as "pro-choice". In 2015, however, his wife posted an Instagram photo of Grammer wearing a T-shirt from the anti-abortion group Abort73.

Grammer has expressed disbelief in the scientific consensus on climate change, comparing the California wildfires to alleged global cooling from his youth and criticizing the 2011 and 2018 climate meetings. Additionally, he stated in a 2016 interview with The Guardian that the person he admired most was Vladimir Putin "because he is so comfortably who he is". In 2019, he issued a statement in support of Brexit.

Grammer has criticized Washington politicians, stating: "I don't think Washington did us any favors for the last 50, 60 years, I think they've all been sort of the same party, the same bunch of clowns". He has expressed an interest in some day running for the United States Congress, Mayor of New York City, and the presidency. In an interview with radio talk show host Frank Morano in August 2021, he indicated that he was no longer interested in running for office. Grammer was a guest at President George W. Bush's first inauguration. Grammer endorsed Rudy Giuliani in the 2008 presidential primary and later campaigned for John McCain in the general election. Grammer also promoted RightNetwork, a conservative start-up American television network. He endorsed Michele Bachmann for the Republican nomination for president in 2012. Grammer later endorsed Mitt Romney after Romney won the Republican nomination. He initially supported Ben Carson's candidacy for the Republican presidential nomination in 2016, although later stating he would gladly vote for Republican candidate Donald Trump in the upcoming election.

In a December 2023 interview with BBC's Today to promote the new series of Frasier, Grammer confirmed that he still supported Trump. Grammer expressed support for Trump again in a May 2025 interview with The Times. At the 2025 Kennedy Center Honors, Grammer called Trump "One of the greatest presidents we've ever had. Maybe the greatest".

=== Health problems ===
Grammer has a history of substance abuse. In 1988, he was charged with drunk driving and cocaine possession and sentenced to 30 days in jail. In August 1990, Grammer was charged again with cocaine possession and sentenced to three years' probation, fined $500, and required to perform 300 hours of community service. In January 1991, Grammer was given an additional two years' probation for violating his original probation through additional cocaine use. In September 1996, he crashed his Dodge Viper sports car while intoxicated and subsequently checked into the Betty Ford Center for 30 days. Grammer's personal problems affected his work. The cast and producers of both Frasier and Cheers held interventions to help him; co-star Bebe Neuwirth and writer Ken Levine cited delays with rehearsals and filming due to his erratic behavior. Writer Dan O'Shannon recalled:

He would ooze into the studio, his life all out of sorts. Jimmy would say "Action," and he would snap into Frasier and expound in this very erudite dialogue and be pitch-perfect. And Jimmy would yell "Cut!" and he would ooze back into Kelsey—glazed-over eyes, half asleep, going through whatever he was going through. It was the most amazing transformation I'd ever seen.

Grammer credits his religious faith for helping him confront his personal problems.

On May 31, 2008, while paddleboarding with his then wife Camille in Hawaiʻi, Grammer had a heart attack. Their personal assistant, Scott MacLean, was essential in saving Grammer's life. Grammer was discharged on June 4, 2008, and was said to be "resting comfortably" at his Hawaii residence. Seven weeks after the attack, Grammer told Entertainment Tonight that although his spokesman described the attack as mild, it really was more severe because his heart had stopped. Grammer thought Fox's decision to cancel his television sitcom Back to You contributed to his health problems, saying: "It was a very stressful time for me, and a surprise that it was cancelled. But you know, everything that doesn't kill us—which it almost did—makes us stronger!"

=== Legal issues ===
In 1988, Grammer was arrested for possession of one-quarter gram of cocaine after being pulled over in a traffic stop for driving with expired plates in North Hollywood, California. A year earlier, he had been arrested for a DUI in Van Nuys, California, and would go on to serve 14 days of a 30-day sentence. Grammer later served 10 days of community service after failing to comply with the requirements of his parole in 1990. Later in the same year, Grammer was sentenced to 90 days of house arrest, was ordered to pay a $500 fine, underwent drug and alcohol abuse counseling, and performed 300 hours of community service for his 1988 cocaine possession case.

In 1995, Grammer was accused of having sex with his child's underage babysitter. A grand jury chose not to indict the actor, stating: "The young woman's delay of more than a year in pressing charges against Mr. Grammer made it difficult to support her claim." Grammer released a statement shortly afterward, saying, "I have said from the outset that there was no basis for the allegations."

In 1996, Grammer's ex-girlfriend Cerlette Lamme sued him for defamation of character and invasion of privacy over content he included in his autobiography So Far....

In 1998, Grammer filed a lawsuit against Internet Entertainment Group (IEG), which Grammer claimed had stolen from his home a videotape of him in bed with a woman. IEG counter-sued Grammer, denying it was in possession of such a tape, and Grammer's suit was dropped. IEG President Seth Warshavsky later said, "We have been presented with another Kelsey Grammer tape. But we have no plans to air it. We are still evaluating it at this time."

== Acting credits ==
Key
Clock	Denotes productions that have not yet been released

=== Film ===
Year	Title	Role	Notes
1992	Galaxies Are Colliding	Peter	
1995	Runaway Brain	Dr. Frankenollie	Voice; short film
1996	Down Periscope	Tom Dodge	
1997	Anastasia	Vladimir	Voice
1998	The Real Howard Spitz	Howard Spitz	
1999	Standing on Fishes	Verk	
1999	Bartok the Magnificent	Zozi	Voice; Direct-to-video
1999	Mickey's Once Upon a Christmas	Narrator	Voice; Direct-to-video
1999	Toy Story 2	Stinky Pete the Prospector	Voice
2001	15 Minutes	Robert Hawkins	
2001	Just Visiting	Narrator	Uncredited
2001	God Lives Underwater: Fame	Robert Hawkins	Short film
2003	The Big Empty	Agent Banks	
2003	Barbie of Swan Lake	Rothbart	Voice; direct-to-video
2004	Teacher's Pet	Dr. Ivan Krank	Voice
2005	The Good Humor Man	Mr. Skibness	
2006	Even Money	Detective Brunner	
2006	X-Men: The Last Stand	Dr. Henry "Hank" McCoy / Beast	
2007	The Simpsons Movie	Sideshow Bob	Voice, scenes deleted
2008	Swing Vote	President Andrew Boone	
2008	An American Carol	George S. Patton	
2009	Middle Men	Frank Griffin	
2009	Fame	Mr. Martin Cranston	
2010	Crazy on the Outside	Frank	
2011	I Don't Know How She Does It	Clark Cooper	
2013	Monsters University	Henry J. Waternoose III	Voice, deleted scene
2013	Legends of Oz: Dorothy's Return	Tin Man	Voice
2014	X-Men: Days of Future Past	Dr. Henry "Hank" McCoy / Beast	Uncredited cameo; Shared role with Nicholas Hoult
2014	Think Like a Man Too	Lee Fox	
2014	The Expendables 3	Bonaparte	
2014	Transformers: Age of Extinction	Harold Attinger	
2014	Reach Me	Angelo AldoBrandini	
2014	Breaking the Bank	Charles Bunbury	
2015	Entourage	Himself	Cameo
2015	Best of Enemies	William F. Buckley Jr.	Voice; Documentary
2016	Neighbors 2: Sorority Rising	Mr. Robek, Shelby's Dad	Cameo
2016	Storks	Hunter	Voice
2017	Bunyan and Babe	The Amazing Blackstone / Norman Blandsford	Voice
2018	Guardians of the Tomb	Mason	
2018	Like Father	Harry Hamilton	
2019	Grand Isle	Detective Jones	
2020	Money Plane	Darius Emmanuel Grouch III, aka "The Rumble"	
2021	The Space Between	Micky Adams	
2021	The God Committee	Dr. Andre Boxer	
2021	Trollhunters: Rise of the Titans	Blinky Galadrigal	Voice
2021	Charming the Hearts of Men	Congressman	
2021	Father Christmas Is Back	James Christmas	
2021	Miss Willoughby and the Haunted Bookshop	Robert Windsor	
2022	Christmas in Paradise	James Christmas	Sequel to Father Christmas is Back (2021)
2022	High Expectations	Coach Harrison Davis	
2023	Jesus Revolution	Chuck Smith	
2023	The Marvels	Dr. Henry "Hank" McCoy / Beast (Earth-10005)	Uncredited cameo; post-credits scene
2024	Wanted Man	Brynner	
2024	Murder Company	General Haskel	
2024	The Most Wonderful Time of the Year	Sideshow Bob	Voice; short film
2025	Wish You Were Here	Dad	
2025	Turbulence	Harry	
2026	Young Washington	Thomas Fairfax	
2026	Avengers: Doomsday †	Dr. Henry "Hank" McCoy / Beast (Earth-10005)	Post-production

=== Television ===
Year	Title	Role	Notes
1979	Ryan's Hope	Waiter	Uncredited; Episode: "#1.1051"
1982	Another World	Head Paramedic	Episode: "#1.4498"
1982	Macbeth	Lennox	Television film
1983	Kennedy	Stephen Smith	5 episodes
1984	Kate & Allie	David Hamill	Episode: "Allie's First Date"
1984	George Washington	Lieutenant Stewart	Television miniseries
1984–1993	Cheers	Dr. Frasier Crane	203 episodes
1986	Crossings	Craig Lawson	2 episodes
1987	You Are the Jury	Stuart Cooper	Episode: "The State of Oregon vs. Stanley Manning"
1987	J.J. Starbuck	Pierce Morgan	Episode: "Murder in E Minor"
1988	Mickey's 60th Birthday	Dr. Frasier Crane	Television special
1988	Dance 'til Dawn	Ed Strull	Television film
1989	227	Mr. Anderson	Episode: "For Sale"
1989	Top of the Hill	Dutch Vanderbill	Episode: "Top of the Hill"
1990	The Tracey Ullman Show	Mr. Brenna	Episode: "Maria and the Mister"
1990	The Magical World of Disney	Dr. Frasier Crane	Episode: "Disneyland's 35th Anniversary Celebration"
1990	The Earth Day Special	Dr. Frasier Crane	Television special
1990–present	The Simpsons	Sideshow Bob	Voice; 25 episodes
1991	Baby Talk	Russell	Episode: "One Night with Elliot"
1991–1998	Saturday Night Live	Himself	3 episodes; Host (2 episodes); Cameo (Episode: "Kirstie Alley/Tom Petty")
1992	Wings	Dr. Frasier Crane	Episode: "Planes, Trains and Visiting Cranes"
1992	Star Trek: The Next Generation	Capt. Morgan Bateson	Episode: "Cause and Effect"
1993	Roc	Detective Rush	Episode: "To Love and Die on Emerson Street (Part 2)"
1993	Appointment for a Killing	Ron McNally	Television film
1993–2004	Frasier	Dr. Frasier Crane	264 episodes
1994	The Innocent	Det. Frank Barlow	Television film
1995	Biography	George Washington	Documentary; Episode: "Benedict Arnold: Triumph and Treason"
1996	London Suite	Sydney Nichols	Television film
1997	Fired Up	Tom Whitman	2 episodes
1998	The Pentagon Wars	General Partridge	Television film
1998	Just Shoot Me!	Narrator	Voice; Episode: "How the Finch Stole Christmas"
1999	Animal Farm	Snowball	Voice; Television film
2000	Stark Raving Mad	Professor Tuttle	Episode: "The Grade"
2001	The Sports Pages	Howard Greene	Television film; Segment "How Doc Waddems Finally Broke 100"
2002	Mr. St. Nick	Nick St. Nicholas	Television film
2003	Benedict Arnold: A Question of Honor	George Washington	Television film
2003	Becker	Rick Cooper	Episode: "But I've Got Friends I Haven't Used Yet"
2003	Gary the Rat	Gary Andrews	Voice; 13 episodes
2004	A Christmas Carol: The Musical	Ebenezer Scrooge	Television film
2004	Sesame Street	Himself	
2005	The Sketch Show	Various characters	6 episodes
2006	Medium	Bob Sherman / Angel of Death	Episode: "Death Takes a Policy"
2007–2008	Back to You	Chuck Darling	17 episodes
2009	Hank	Hank Pryor	10 episodes
2010	The Troop	Dr. Cranius	Voice; Episode: "Do Not Talk to Dr. Cranius"
2010–2012	30 Rock	Himself	3 episodes
2011–2012	Boss	Mayor Tom Kane	18 episodes
2014	Partners	Allen Braddock	10 episodes
2015	Killing Jesus	King Herod/Narrator	Television film
2016	Unbreakable Kimmy Schmidt	Himself	Voice; Episode: "Kimmy Kidnaps Gretchen!"
2016–2017	The Last Tycoon	Pat Brady	9 episodes
2016–2018	Trollhunters: Tales of Arcadia	Blinky Galadrigal	Voice; 52 episodes
2017	Modern Family	Keifth	Episode: "Ringmaster Keifth"
2017	Porters	Mendel Dolem	Episode: "#1.1"
2018–2019	3Below: Tales of Arcadia	Blinky Galadrigal	Voice; 2 episodes
2019	Arrow	Narrator	Voice; Episode: "Emerald Archer" (uncredited)
2019	Proven Innocent	Gore Bellows	13 episodes
2019	You're Not a Monster	John Seward	Voice; 10 episodes
2020	Carol's Second Act	Richard	Episode: "R.I.P. Dr. Herman"
2020	Wizards: Tales of Arcadia	Blinky Galadrigal	Voice; 9 episodes
2021	Dr. Death	Dr. Geoffrey Skadden	4 episodes
2021	The Ghost and Molly McGee	Abraham Lincoln	Voice; Episode: "Not So Honest Abe"
2022	Flowers in the Attic: The Origin	Garland Foxworth	Episode: "Part One: The Marriage"
2022	The 12 Days of Christmas Eve	Brian Conway	Television film
2023–2024	Frasier	Dr. Frasier Crane	20 episodes
2025	The Christmas Ring	Howard Miller	Television film
2026	The Hunting Party	Noah Cyrus	Episode: "Noah Cyrus"

=== Theatre ===
Year	Title	Role	Venue	Ref.
1981	Macbeth	Lennox	Vivian Beaumont Theatre, Broadway	
1982	Othello	Michael Cassio	Winter Garden Theatre, Broadway	
1982	Plenty	Codename Lazar	The Public Theater, Off-Broadway	
1983	Quartermaine's Terms	Mark Sackling	Playhouse 91, Off-Broadway	
1983	Sunday in the Park with George	A Soldier / Alex / Young Man on the Bank	Playwrights Horizons, Off-Broadway	
1992	Richard II	King Richard II	Mark Taper Forum, Los Angeles	
1999	Sweeney Todd: The Demon Barber of Fleet Street	Sweeney Todd	Ahmanson Theatre, Los Angeles	
2000	Macbeth	Macbeth	Colonial Theater, Boston	
2000	Macbeth	Macbeth	Music Box Theatre, Broadway	
2007	My Fair Lady	Professor Henry Higgins	Avery Fisher Hall, Lincoln Center	
2010–2011	La Cage aux Folles	Georges	Longacre Theatre, Broadway	
2015–2016	Finding Neverland	Charles Frohman / Captain James Hook	Lunt-Fontanne Theatre, Broadway	
2015–2017	The Color Purple	—N/a	Producer; Bernard B. Jacobs Theatre, Broadway	
2017	Big Fish	Edward Bloom	The Other Palace, Off West End	
2018	Beauty and the Beast	Lumière	Hollywood Bowl, Los Angeles	
2019	Man of La Mancha	Don Quixote / Miguel de Cervantes	London Coliseum, West End	
2024	Candide	Professor Pangloss	Wichita Grand Opera	
2026	Bernadette the Musical	—N/a	Producer; Athenaeum Center for Thought and Culture, Chicago, Illinois	

=== Video games ===
Year	Title	Voice role
1999	Toy Story 2: Buzz Lightyear to the Rescue	Stinky Pete the Prospector
2002	Quest for the Code	Mucus Airgon
2007	The Simpsons Game	Sideshow Bob

=== Theme parks ===
Year	Title	Role	Notes
2008	The Simpsons Ride	Sideshow Bob	

== Production work ==
=== Director ===
Year	Title	Notes
1996–2004	Frasier	36 episodes
2001	Neurotic Tendencies	Pilot
2005	Out of Practice	2 episodes
2006	My Ex Life	Pilot
2007	Everybody Hates Chris	Episode: "Everybody Hates the Last Day"
2009	Hank	2 episodes
2009	Alligator Point	Pilot
2014	Partners	2 episodes
2023–2024	Frasier	8 episodes

=== Producer ===
Year	Title	Contribution	Notes
1993–2004	Frasier	Executive producer	262 episodes
1994	The Innocent	Executive producer	Television film
1995	Kelsey Grammer Salutes Jack Benny	Executive producer	Television documentary
1997–1998	Fired Up	Executive producer	28 episodes
2000–2008	Girlfriends	Executive producer	172 episodes
2001	Neurotic Tendencies	Executive producer	Pilot
2002–2003	In-Laws	Executive producer	15 episodes
2003	Gary the Rat	Executive producer	12 episodes
2003	Alligator Point	Executive producer	Pilot
2004	The Soluna Project	Executive producer	Pilot
2005	The Good Humor Man	Executive producer	Feature film
2005	Kelsey Grammer Presents: The Sketch Show	Executive producer	6 episodes
2005	World Cup Comedy	Executive producer	6 episodes
2005–2011	Medium	Executive producer	129 episodes
2006–2009	The Game	Executive producer	64 episodes
2007	Dash 4 Cash	Executive producer	Pilot
2007–2008	Back to You	Executive producer	17 episodes
2009–2010	Hank	Executive producer	6 episodes
2010	The Kelsey Grammer Bill Zucker Comedy Hour	Producer	Pilot
2011–2012	Boss	Executive producer	18 episodes
2014	Partners	Executive producer	10 episodes
2018	Light as a Feather	Executive producer	13 episodes
2022	Phat Tuesdays: The Era of Hip Hop Comedy	Executive producer	3 episodes
2023–2024	Frasier	Executive producer	20 episodes

== Awards and nominations ==
Grammer has won many awards and accolades, particularly for Frasier. He was the first American actor to be nominated for multiple Emmy awards for portraying the same character on three different television shows: Cheers, Frasier, and Wings. In 2010, Grammer received his first Tony Award nomination for Best Actor in a Musical for his performance in La Cage Aux Folles opposite Douglas Hodge. He later won the Best Revival of a Musical, as a producer of The Color Purple, in 2016. In 2001, he was presented with a star on the Hollywood Walk of Fame for television. He received a nomination from the Directors Guild of America Award in 1999 for directing the Frasier episode "Merry Christmas, Mrs. Moskowitz". At the Golden Globes, he has received nine nominations and won three: two for Frasier and one for Boss.
