= Intrigo: Death of an Author =

- Theatrical release poster
- Directed by: Daniel Alfredson
- Written by: Daniel Alfredson; Birgitta Bongenhielm
- Produced by: Rick Dugdale; Thomas Peter Friedl; Uwe Schott
- Starring: Ben Kingsley; Benno Fürmann
- Cinematography: Paweł Edelman
- Edited by: Håkan Karlsson
- Music by: Anders Niska; Klas Wahl
- Distributed by: 20th Century Fox (Germany); Lionsgate (United States)
- Release dates: October 11, 2018 (Germany and Austria); January 17, 2020 (United States)
- Running time: 106 minutes
- Countries: Germany; Sweden; United States
- Language: English

Intrigo: Death of an Author is a 2018 German-Swedish-American mystery crime drama film directed by Daniel Alfredson and starring Ben Kingsley and Benno Fürmann. The film is based on a series of novellas by Håkan Nesser. It is the first of the Intrigo franchise of films.

== Plot ==
David finds the author Alex Henderson living alone on a Greek island. David tells him the story of his novel which interweaves the story of his own life. Nothing is made very clear as the film switches back and forth from the conversation to the plot of the novel and the parallels to David's life.

== Cast ==
- Ben Kingsley as Henderson
- Benno Fürmann as David
- Tuva Novotny as Eva
- Michael Byrne as Keller
- Veronica Ferres as Kerr
- Daniela Lavender as Mariam
- Tor Clark as Doris
- David Lowe as Edgar L.
- Jason Riddington as Otto Gerlach
- Sandra Dickinson as Madame H.
- Angus Kennedy as Mort
- Ed Cooper Clarke as Thomas Neumann-Hansen
- Chris Crema as Ansgar
- Elizabeth Counsell as Frau Bloeme
- Annamaria Serda as agent
- Sian Webber as judge
- Petar Cirica as newspaper salesman
- Gordan Kičić as journalist
- Ivona Kustudić as policewoman
- Erik Johansson as Mauritz Winkler
- Mladen Solvilj as young man
- Andria Kazelas as reporter 1
- Greg Lockett as reporter 2

== Reception ==
Intrigo: Death of an Author has an 11% approval rating on Rotten Tomatoes based on nine reviews, with an average rating of 5.1/10. Based on 5 critics on Metacritic, the film has a score of 45 out of a 100, indicating "mixed or average" reviews.

Nell Minow of RogerEbert.com awarded the film three stars, explaining her reasoning by writing that "Intrigo: Death of an Author tells us that the gulf between what we want to know and what we can know may never be illuminated". David Robb of Slant Magazine awarded it one and a half stars out of four, criticizing it for being "neither the visceral pleasures of noir nor the precision to uncover deeper thematic resonances".

According to Glenn Kenny of The New York Times, "The stagings are stilted; the relations between the conflicted characters never catch fire".

Michael Rechtshaffen of the Los Angeles Times wasn't impressed by the film either. His reaction was: "[W]hen it comes to intricately strategized stories involving writers and their output, their telling would ultimately have been better served by the reader's imagination".

== Sequels ==
The film has two sequels, Intrigo: Dear Agnes and Intrigo: Samaria, which were released in Germany on October 10, 2019. Phoebe Fox, from the cast of the latter, makes a cameo appearance in this film. All three films have scenes in the café Intrigo.
