= Intrigo: Dear Agnes =

2019 mystery crime drama film

- Film poster
- Directed by: Daniel Alfredson
- Written by: Daniel Alfredson; Birgitta Bongenhielm
- Produced by: Rick Dugdale; Thomas Peter Friedl; Uwe Schott
- Starring: Carla Juri; Gemma Chan; Jamie Sives
- Cinematography: Paweł Edelman
- Edited by: Håkan Karlsson
- Music by: Anders Niska; Klas Wahl
- Production companies: Enderby Entertainment; The Amazing Film Company; Umedia; Seine Pictures
- Distributed by: 20th Century Fox (Germany); Lionsgate (United States
- Release date: October 10, 2019
- Running time: 100 minutes
- Countries: Germany; Sweden; United States
- Language: English

Intrigo: Dear Agnes is a 2019 German-Swedish-American mystery crime drama film directed by Daniel Alfredson and starring Carla Juri, Gemma Chan and Jamie Sives. It is the sequel of the 2018 film Intrigo: Death of an Author (2018).

== Plot summary ==
Agnes and Henny, a college literature professor and once aspiring actress respectively, were once the closest of friends, they practically inseparable for a year in their young adulthood, until they had a falling out. They have not seen each other in over ten years, not knowing the intimate details of the other's present life, until they see each other from afar at the funeral of Agnes' husband, Erich Neuman-Hansen, who passed after suffering from leukemia. Henny's presence at the funeral is not by chance as she is seemingly aware of Agnes' predicament following Erich's passing. He has left half his estate to her, and half to his young adult stepchildren, Thomas and Carla, that estate including her and Erich's house, long having been in the Neuman-Hansen family, whereas Agnes thought the house would be placed in trust under her name. Thomas, never having trusted Agnes, has convinced Carla to take their half share now, meaning that they as a collective will have to sell the property as Agnes does not have the funds to buy out her stepchildren. Agnes is to kill Henny's self-absorbed husband, Peter Grossman, a theater producer, while Henny, in return, would provide Agnes with the necessary funds, no matter the amount, for her to buy Thomas and Carla's half to allow her to stay in the house. Despite the reasons beyond no longer loving Peter in wanting him dead, Henny has been unable to pull the proverbial trigger herself. The primary question then becomes if there are underlying motivations for Henny asking Agnes to kill Peter or Agnes' decision on the matter that may relate to the reason for their falling out over ten years ago where Henny stole Agnes part in the theater production.

== Cast ==
- Carla Juri as Agnes
- Gemma Chan as Henny
- Jamie Sives as Peter
- Cal MacAninch as Erich Neuman-Hansen
- John Sessions as Pumpermann
- Predrag Bjelac as Caretaker
- Ash Hunter as Johann Clausen
- Laurie Kynaston as Johannes
- Ed Cooper Clarke as Thomas Neuman-Hansen
- Jason Wong as Benjamin
- Tor Clark as Doris
- Clemmie Dugdale as Clara
- Jacob James Beswick as Klaus-Joseph
- Chris Crema as Ansgar
- Josephine Butler as Susanne Lieberman
- Amelia Clarkson as Louise
- Anina Isabel Haghani as Cordelia
- Elizabeth Counsell as Frau Bloeme
- Kim Adis as student 1
- Ivana Dudic as student 2
- Olaf Ouwersloot as neighbor
- Aleksandra Lojić as colleague
