= Shoot to Kill (1988 film) =

1988 film by Roger Spottiswoode

- Theatrical release poster
- Directed by: Roger Spottiswoode
- Screenplay by: Harv Zimmel; Michael Burton; Daniel Petrie Jr.
- Story by: Harv Zimmel
- Produced by: Daniel Petrie Jr. Ron Silverman
- Starring: Sidney Poitier; Tom Berenger; Kirstie Alley
- Cinematography: Michael Chapman
- Edited by: George Bowers; Garth Craven
- Music by: John Scott
- Production companies: Touchstone Pictures; Silver Screen Partners III; Century Park Pictures Corporation
- Distributed by: Buena Vista Pictures Distribution
- Release date: February 12, 1988
- Running time: 110 minutes
- Country: United States
- Language: English
- Budget: $15 million
- Box office: $29.3 million

Shoot to Kill (known outside North America as Deadly Pursuit) is a 1988 American buddy cop action thriller film directed by Roger Spottiswoode and starring Sidney Poitier (in his first role in eleven years), Tom Berenger, Clancy Brown, Andrew Robinson, and Kirstie Alley. The film follows an FBI agent pursuing a homicidal extortionist; when the extortionist kidnaps a fishing guide in the Pacific Northwest, the agent teams up with her partner, a local wilderness guide, to rescue her.

The film was released to positive reviews from critics, who praised the film's direction, performances, and quality despite its formulaic plot, that said Buddy movies of this type were extremely popular in the 1980s and this film is no exception.

== Plot ==
In San Francisco, a man is discovered breaking into his own jewelry store. The FBI questions him and learns the man's wife is being held hostage at their home by a brutal extortionist, who demands the store's diamonds for her life. During a standoff at the jeweler's home, the extortionist shoots the family's maid and demands that he be allowed to bring the jeweler's wife to the docks. Veteran FBI special agent Warren Stantin goes after them, but his effort to apprehend the extortionist leads to the jeweler's wife being shot in the left eye and killed, while the extortionist rigs a boat as a decoy and escapes.

Stantin trails him to Washington, where a man has been found shot in the left eye at a mine in a mountainous forest. Convinced that the extortionist killed the man and stole his identity, Stantin discovers that a fishing party led by local fishing guide Sarah Rennell entered the forest from the mine, and he enlists her partner Jonathan Knox to help find them; Knox, who wanted to search for Sarah by himself, reluctantly agrees. Meanwhile, Sarah's fishing party halts when a fisherman nearly falls from a ledge, and another fisherman, Steve, attempts to help him. When a gun he is carrying slips into a crack, Steve asks the fisherman to return it but then lets the fisherman fall, throws the rest of the fishing party off the ledge, and takes Sarah hostage, demanding that she lead him to Canada.

After crossing a treacherous gorge, Stantin and Knox make camp and discover the bodies of the slain fishermen in a stream. The pair reach Sarah's cabin, where Steve and Sarah recuperateted for the night, and find a note to the FBI in Sarah's handwriting, confirming that she is still alive. The pursuit continues into a snowstorm in the mountains, where Knox pulls Stantin the rest of the way so he can recover from exhaustion. The pair gain respect for each other, which improves when Stantin rescues Knox from a grizzly bear. Sarah breaks free from Steve, who fires his gun at her, alerting Stantin and Knox to their location; however, Steve recaptures Sarah and escapes in a logging truck.

Stantin and Knox arrive in Vancouver, where they understand that Steve and Sarah broke into a home to rest and call a diamond broker. Stantin and Knox break into the broker's home and interrogate him to find out where he plans to meet Steve. The pair stake out the meeting place and find Steve holding Sarah, but Steve spots Knox. After a brief shootout, Steve carjacks an SUV and leads Stantin, Knox, and the Vancouver Police Department on a car chase. Stantin and Knox notice the SUV on a departing ferry, but police search the SUV and do not locate them; Stantin realizes that this is another decoy, and he and Knox search a second ferry.

Stantin distracts Steve in a shootout while Knox frees Sarah. When Steve runs off and takes a passenger and her children hostage, Stantin draws his attention and is shot multiple times. Steve prepares to dispatch Stantin, but he has run out of bullets; both men fall overboard, and Stantin kills Steve. Knox dives into the water to rescue Stantin, and the they are picked up by a rescue boat. Stantin survives his wounds, because of Knox's fast courage.

== Cast ==
- Sidney Poitier as Warren Stantin
- Tom Berenger as Jonathan Knox
- Kirstie Alley as Sarah Renell
- Clancy Brown as Steve
- Frederick Coffin as Ralph
- Richard Masur as Norman
- Andrew Robinson as Harvey
- Kevin Scannell as Ben
- Michael MacRae as Fournier
- Milton Selzer as Mr. Berger
- Les Lannom as Sheriff Dave Arnett
- Robert Lesser as Agent Minelli
- Walter Marsh as Sam Baker
- William S. Taylor as Police Captain
- Ken Camroux as Charles Denham
- Fred Henderson as Agent Owenby
- Samuel Hiona as Inspector Hsu
- Janet Rotblatt as Mrs. Berger
- Frank C. Turner as Austin Crilley

== Reception ==
=== Box office ===
The film grossed $29.3 million on a $15 million budget.

=== Critical response ===
The film holds a 100% approval rating on Rotten Tomatoes, based on reviews from 14 critics.

Janet Maslin of The New York Times remarked that it "marks the return of Sidney Poitier after a long absence from the screen, and a reappearance of good old-fashioned storytelling technique as well. This is essentially a formula film, and as such it's nothing fancy. But it has crisp, spare direction, enormous momentum and a story full of twists and turns. For anyone who thinks they don't make spine-tingling detective films the way they used to, good news: they've just made another."

In a three-star review, Roger Ebert recalled that it was "yet another example, rather late in the day, of the buddy movie, that most dependable genre from the early 1970s. The formula still works. Two characters who have nothing in common are linked together on a dangerous mission, and after a lot of close calls they survive, prevail and become buddies". He stated that Poitier "is probably not going to win any awards for this performance, but it's nice to have him back".

In a mixed review, Shelia Benson opined in the Los Angeles Times that "too many cooks overlooked too many mistakes of character and logic here; they seem to have made characters out of smudgy carbons instead of living tissue. The Poitier and Berenger roles are perfunctorily sketched, their exchanges sometimes excruciatingly embarrassing. It's nice to have a leading woman who knows her way around the outdoors, but every chance possible to have intelligence pitted against brute force has been ignored. In Shoot to Kill (MPAA-rated R for violence) the scenery is wild, the movie is a walk on the tame side".
