= Loren Pope =

American journalist (1910–2008)

- Born: July 13, 1910
- Died: September 23, 2008 (aged 98)
- Education: DePauw University
- Occupations: Author, Editor
- Employer: The New York Times
- Notable work: Colleges That Change Lives

Loren Brooks Pope (July 13, 1910 – September 23, 2008) was an American writer and educational consultant, best known for his book, Colleges That Change Lives. He was also the education editor of The New York Times.

== Background ==
Born in Minneapolis, Pope grew up in northern Virginia. He was a Democrat, in a family of stalwart Republicans. He was an alumnus of DePauw University. Pope married and divorced Charlotte Swart Pope and Ida Wallace Pope. Pope was married 24 years to Viola Barrett Greenland Pope, who lived to the age of 96.

In 1965, Pope, founded the College Placement Bureau, one of the first independent college placement counseling services in the United States.

His first book, The Right College: How to Get In, Stay In, Get Back In (Macmillan, 1970), was followed by a nationally syndicated article series, "Twenty Myths That Can Jinx Your College Choice," published in The Washington Post Magazine and Reader's Digest. A second book, Looking Beyond the Ivy League: Finding the College That’s Right for You (Penguin, 1995), was written and published several years later. Pope was also known for commissioning the Pope-Leighey House in 1939, designed and constructed originally in Falls Church, Virginia, by Frank Lloyd Wright. Pope, who was working as a $50-a-week copy editor at the Washington Evening Star (his employer financed the construction), convinced Wright to build the small house by writing him a famously flattering letter. Pope opened, "There are certain things a man wants during life, and, of life. Material things and things of the spirit. The writer has one fervent wish that includes both. It is for a house created by you." He closed with the plea, "Will you create a house for us? Will you?" The architect's reply was brief: "Dear Loren Pope: Of course I am ready to give you a house."

== Colleges That Change Lives ==
His final and best-selling work, Colleges That Change Lives, profiled his top 40 choices—schools that he said would "do as much as, and perhaps even more than, any name-brand schools to fully educate students and to give them rich, full lives." He focused mainly on small liberal arts colleges, arguing that smaller, less selective institutions offered superior educational experiences. The first edition was first published in 1996, with revised editions in 2000 and 2006. A final fourth revision was published in 2012 after Pope's death, updated by Hilary Masell Oswald. A non-profit organization modeled after the book now carries the name.
