= Stick with Me, Kid =

- Created by: Peter Hume
- Starring: Kristopher Milnes; Leigh Lawson
- Country of origin: United Kingdom
- No. of episodes: 13

Production
- Executive producer: Daniel Petrie Jr.
- Producers: Ken Kaufman; Harry Waterson
- Production company: Buena Vista Productions Ltd.

Original release
- Network: Disney Channel
- Release: 1995

Stick With Me, Kid is a British television series created by Peter Hume that aired in 1995 on The Disney Channel. The series was created by Peter Hume, produced by Buena Vista Productions Ltd. and starred Kristopher Milnes and Leigh Lawson. The executive producer was Daniel Petrie Jr., Supervising Producers were Lee Goldberg & William Rabkin and Hume, and the producers were Ken Kaufman and Harry Waterson.

== Production ==
Filming of the show took place at Bray Studios and at places South of London. A production team from Europe was used. Daniel Petrie Jr. was the pilot's executive producer, while Peter Hume penned its teleplay and Gary Nelson directed the show. The show is directed for children between the ages of seven and 11.

== Premise ==
The show revolved around the life of Ripley Hillard (Milnes), a prodigious but troubled 13-year-old boy. After a diamond is stolen from the local museum, Ripley is determined to solve the case, but fails to attract any attention from the police, as he is only 13 years old. He then seeks the help of Grant Logan (Lawson), an out of work actor, to pose as a detective for him, as the police will only listen to the ideas of an adult.

The first two episodes (the TV movie pilot edited into individual episodes) revolve around the diamond theft, but the remaining 11 episodes focused on a different case each week. Grant would put on the act of the detective, but Ripley would always be the brains. Grant also helped Ripley with his personal problems such as being bullied at school and lack of a father.

== List of the episodes ==
Number	Title	Written By	Director/ Notes
1	Pilot – Part One”	Peter Hume	Gary Nelson
2	The Pilot - Two	Peter Hume	Gary Nelson
3	Cello Goodbye	Peter Hume	TBA
4	Detectives in Training	Lee Goldberg & William Rabkin	David Tucker
5	The Wrath of Rahm	Peter Hume	TBA
6	Every Cloud Has a Silver Lining	Ken Kaufman	Christopher King
7	Frame Up	Jeffery C. Sherman	Harry Harris
8	Man of a Couple Faces	Lee Goldberg & William Rabkin	Gordon Flemyng
9	”Mayhem at the Woodruff Court”	Ken Kaufman	Harry Harris
10	Return of the Morlwagget	Simon Booker	Gordon Flemyng
11	Don't Toy with Me	James L. Novack	Christopher King
12	Charity Case	Peter Hume	Christian I. Nyby II
13	Damsel in This Dress	Fabrice Ziolkowski	Christian I. Nyby II

== Reception ==
Louise Leger of The Globe and Mail praised the show, writing in reference to the character Ripley Hilliard and the actor Leigh Lawson's portray of the unemployed actor Grant Logan, "Ripley is a likable kid and Lawson's portrayal of the down-and-out-yet-egotistical Logan amounts to good fun."
