= RightNetwork =

American video on demand TV network

- Type: Cable video on demand television network
- Country: United States
- Availability: United States, Canada
- Founded: 2010 by Kelsey Grammer, David Jaget
- Owner: Ed Snider
- Key people: Kelsey Grammer, David Jaget, Kevin McFeeley
- Launch date: September 8, 2010
- Dissolved: September 2011
- Picture format: 480i (SDTV); 720p/1080i (HDTV)
- Official website: "RightNetwork.com". 2010. Archived from the original on December 23, 2010.

RightNetwork was a start-up American video on demand television network promoted by American actor, producer and comedian Kelsey Grammer.

The target audience was conservative "Americans who are looking for content that reflects and reinforces their perspective and world-view." Promotional materials indicated that the all-original content would be entertainment programming with "pro-America," "pro-business," and "pro-military" perspectives. The network announced on August 16, 2010 that it would launch nationwide on September 8, 2010. The network ceased operations less than one year later.

== History ==
In a video clip available on the network's website and on YouTube, Grammer explained "There's wrong, and there's right, right network, all that's right with the world." The network had a target launch date of summer 2010, and became available through on-demand cable offerings, online and mobile phones. According to AOL News, as an on-demand offering, RightNetwork is not able to initially attract an audience as large as the audiences for traditional cable networks.

While the network's Web site or Facebook page doesn't specifically say conservatives, it's clearly designed for folks who might be upset with today's government. One of the RightNetwork shows was called "Running," which Grammer described as a reality show following six political rookies running for the first time. The theme through the promotional clip is that these folks are running against "polished politicians."

Due to lack of funding and distribution, the RightNetwork ceased operations, as of September 2011.

== Reactions and controversy ==
Shortly after announcement of the new network, MSNBC's then-political commentator Keith Olbermann featured RightNetwork first on the "World's Worst" segment of Countdown with Keith Olbermann, and comedian Joy Behar, best known as co-host of ABC's The View, also mentioned RightNetwork on her former CNN Headline News show; Yahoo! described it as "a case study of effective viral marketing."

=== Business relations ===
Early blog reports indicating that RightNetwork was developed as a "partner" of Comcast Corporation were erroneous. After the intended launch date was announced in April 2010, the progressive online news blog The Huffington Post published a story calling RightNetwork "Tea Party TV" (a reference to the Tea Party movement), and titled its story, "RightNetwork Launching in 2010 With Comcast As Partner."

A Comcast spokesperson quickly announced that while Comcast had met with RightNetwork representatives, as it has with hundred of other content providers, "We have no partnership with this venture and have no plans to launch or distribute the network." The spokesperson concluded by saying, "We do carry a number of independent networks on Comcast representing a wide variety of interests and diverse viewpoints."
