= Wish You Were Here (2025 film) =

2025 American romantic drama film

- Theatrical release poster
- Directed by: Julia Stiles
- Screenplay by: Renée Carlino; Julia Stiles
- Based on: Wish You Were Here by Renée Carlino
- Produced by: Molly Conners; Amanda Bowers; Gabby Kono-Abdy; Rick Dugdale; Jane Sinisi; Siena Oberman; Julia Stiles
- Starring: Isabelle Fuhrman; Mena Massoud; Jennifer Grey; Kelsey Grammer
- Cinematography: Ryan De Franco
- Edited by: Melody London
- Music by: Vanessa Carlton; John Joseph McCauley III
- Production companies: Phiphen Pictures; Little Fishy; Enderby Entertainment
- Distributed by: Lionsgate
- Release date: January 17, 2025
- Running time: 99 minutes
- Country: United States
- Language: English

Wish You Were Here is a 2025 American romantic drama film directed by Julia Stiles in her feature directorial debut. The film stars Isabelle Fuhrman, Mena Massoud, Jennifer Grey, and Kelsey Grammer. It was released in theaters on January 17, 2025.

== Premise ==
The film follows Charlotte, a woman searching for a spark in her life, who experiences a whirlwind night of romance with a man she meets. The next morning, she notices him acting weird and asks him about it, but he lashes out at her and she leaves his place. In the coming days, he seems to have ghosted her. However, a while later, she discovers he is terminally ill and commits to helping him spend his remaining time meaningfully.

== Cast ==
- Isabelle Fuhrman as Charlotte
- Mena Massoud as Adam
- Jennifer Grey as Mom
- Kelsey Grammer as Dad
- Antonique Smith as Nurse Leah
- Jimmie Fails as Seth
- Jordan Gavaris as Chucky
- Gabby Kono-Abdy as Helen
- Mike Carlsen as Jon Jon
- Jane Stiles as Stacy

== Production ==
In December 2024, it was announced that Julia Stiles would make her feature directorial debut with Wish You Were Here, inspired by a book that had a profound emotional impact on her.

== Release ==
Wish You Were Here was released in theaters on January 17, 2025.

== Reception ==
=== Critical response ===
On the review aggregator website Rotten Tomatoes, 39% of 23 critics' reviews are positive, with an average rating of 4.8/10.
