= Turbulence (2025 film) =

- Theatrical release poster
- Directed by: Claudio Fäh
- Written by: Andy Mayson
- Produced by: Amanda Bowers; Molly Conners; Andy Mayson
- Starring: Hera Hilmar; Jeremy Irvine; Kelsey Grammer; Olga Kurylenko
- Cinematography: Jaime Reynoso
- Edited by: Tamsin Jeffrey
- Music by: Marcus Trumpp
- Production companies: Altitude Film Entertainment; Enderby Entertainment; Head Gear Films; Metrol Technology; Phiphen Pictures
- Distributed by: Lionsgate; Grindstone Entertainment Group (United States); Altitude Film Distribution (United Kingdom)
- Release dates: November 27, 2025 (Middle East); December 12, 2025 (United States); July 3, 2026 (United Kingdom)
- Running time: 95 minutes
- Countries: United States; United Kingdom
- Language: English

Turbulence is a 2025 action thriller film directed by Claudio Fäh and written and produced by Andy Mayson. The film follows a couple who takes a trip on a hot air balloon to the Dolomites to rekindle their relationship, but when a third passenger joins the trip, events take an unexpected turn five thousand meters in the air.

The film was first released in the Middle East on November 27, 2025, and was released in the United States on December 12, by Lionsgate and Grindstone Entertainment Group.

== Plot ==
Zach is a businessman who, after electing to layoff veteran employees of his company, has one of the dismissed employees, Hans, threaten him with a gun before shooting himself. Unsettled by the incident, Zach goes to a bar and sees a woman arguing with the bartender, so he buys her a drink. The grateful woman introduces herself as Julia, and her romantic advances prompt Zach to reply that he is married to kindergarten teacher Emmy, who he is taking the following day to a belated honeymoon on the Dolomites.

Once at the Dolomites resort, Zach tries to cheer up Emmy, whose recent miscarriage made her depressed, and starts receiving threatening messages asking for hush money in return for not revealing his encounter with Julia to Emmy. When the couple goes to take a hot air balloon trip over the mountains, Julia turns out to also be a passenger. Zach tries to cancel the trip, but the balloon's pilot Harry convinces him otherwise. Once at high altitude, Julia says to Emmy that she had a sexual encounter with Zach, which he denies. Julia then draws a knife on Zach, and as she threatens Harry when he tries to stop the balloon's ascent, starts a struggle that sets the balloon's basket on fire. Once the flame is put down, Julia has suffered severe burns, and the rope that controls the balloon's burner has been burnt to half its length.

With the balloon continuing to rise, Harry tries to climb towards the shortened rope to open the balloon vent. Julia awakens and in trying to pull Harry back makes him fall off the balloon. As the remaining three suffer with altitude sickness, Emmy manages to open the vent, stabilizing the balloon, which starts a slow free fall. After tying up an unconscious Julia, the couple maneuvers the balloon to avoid crashing into a mountain, though the envelope is still scraped. Once Julia awakens again, Zach asks why she went after him, and she reveals Hans was her father. Julia then frees herself with the knife and stabs Zach in the arm. As Emmy tries to calm Julia down, Zach fatally bludgeons Julia in the head with the fire extinguisher.

Emmy and Zach try to keep the damaged balloon steady in its descent, making it avoid the ridges, and with Emmy almost falling once part of the basket's floor collapses. Once the mountains pass, Emmy decides to check if Julia's accusations of infidelity are true, takes Zach's phone and among the messages he tried to delete finds a video of him having sex with Julia. Emmy confronts Zach about lying, and he responds in a demeaning way, complaining that Emmy was denying him intimacy in her grief, and saying she barely makes any money and cannot live without him. When she threatens to divorce him and get half of what he owns, Zach advances towards her in a threatening manner. Zach falls through the basket's hole, and he pleads with Emmy to save him, but she instead throws Julia's corpse at him to make him fall. She then throws her wedding ring out as well.

The balloon eventually makes landfall in a field. Emmy ignites its remains, and walks away from the burning wreck.

== Cast ==
- Hera Hilmar as Emmy
- Jeremy Irvine as Zach
- Kelsey Grammer as Harry
- Olga Kurylenko as Julia

== Production ==
The action thriller film was directed by Claudio Fäh and written and produced by Andy Mayson. Olga Kurylenko, Jeremy Irvine, Hera Hilmar, and Kelsey Grammer star in the film. Will Clarke and Andy Mayson of Altitude Film Entertainment produced the film, alongside Molly Conners and Amanda Bowers of Phiphen Pictures. Executive producers of the film are Mike Runagall, Gursharn Khaira and Laura Wilson under Altitude, Richard J. Berthy and Jane Sinisi under Phiphen, Phil Hunt and Compton Ross under Head Gear Films and Metrol Technology, Frank Kaminski and Philip Nauck under Green & Blue, Michael Bassick and Michael Laundon under M2 Media Post, and Sunny Vohra, Superna Sethi and Andrew Boswell under Twickenham Studios, as well as Leeshon Alexander, Peter Iliff, Rick Dugdale, Claudio Fäh, and Jeremy Irvine. Principal photography took place on the Dolomites and London, and at Twickenham Film Studios, with filming wrapping and post-production starting in December 2024. The music was composed by Marcus Trumpp.

Fäh said that after he and Mayson worked on No Way Up, the writer called him and said “You know, we were at the bottom of the ocean on this one. How about we go high up in the air on the next one?”, telling about his idea of a movie set in a hot air balloon. Given the dangers of actually filming in an airborne balloon, the film instead combined footage of the Dolomites filmed on a helicopter with the actors in front of a blue screen in a soundstage.

== Release ==
The film was first released in the Middle East on November 27, 2025, before releasing in the United States theatrically and on VOD on December 12 by Lionsgate and Grindstone Entertainment Group. Altitude Film Distribution released the film in the United Kingdom on July 3, 2026.

== Reception ==
Brian Orndorf of Blu-ray.com gave the film three out of five stars and a 6/10 score, noting the film's entertainment value, mostly during the first half of the film, but doesn't quite reach its potential. Joe Botten of Loud and Clear Reviews criticized the production, calling it "coach", but praised the ambition of the film.
