= Narrative evaluation =

In alternative education, narrative evaluation is a form of performance measurement and feedback which can be used as an alternative or supplement to grading. Narrative evaluations generally consist of several paragraphs of written text about a student's individual performance and course work. The style and form of narrative evaluations vary significantly among the educational institutions using them, and they are sometimes combined with other performance metrics, including letter and number grades and pass/fail designations.

== Colleges and universities in the United States ==
- Alverno College, Milwaukee, Wisconsin
- Antioch University
- Bennington College, Bennington, Vermont
- Brown University, Providence, Rhode Island
- The Evergreen State College, Olympia, Washington
- Hampshire College, Amherst, Massachusetts
- Prescott College, Prescott, Arizona
- Reed College, Portland, Oregon
- Sarah Lawrence College, Yonkers, New York
- St. John's College
- University of Redlands - Johnston Center for Integrative Studies, Redlands, California
- Western Washington University - Fairhaven College, Bellingham, Washington
- Maharishi International University, Fairfield, Iowa

== See also ==
- Colleges That Change Lives
