= Ed Cooper Clarke =

British actor

Ed Cooper Clarke is a British writer, actor and teacher from London, England.

== Education ==
Clarke studied drama at Birmingham University and then graduated with a master's degree in Classical European Acting from The Drama Centre London, Class of 2008/2009.

== Career ==
Clarke appeared as Jeremy Fry, best man to Antony Armstrong-Jones who married Princess Margaret in season 2 of The Crown,

He was also seen in ITV's Downton Abbey, playing the Honourable Timothy Grey, the second son of Lord Merton.

Other roles on screen have included

- Robert Malmort in episode 5.2 "The Labyrinth of the Minotaur" of BBC's Father Brown
- Mark Hooper, an unhinged cryptozoologist, in ITV's Whitechapel (series 4, episode 5).
- Admiral Intelligence Officer in Matthew Vaughan's The King's Man
- Thomas Neuman-Hansen in the Europena cinema trilogy Intrigo: Death of an Author with Ben Kingsley

Theatre work has included:

- Captain Fitzroy in the Theatre Royal Bath production of The Madness of George III, which ran in London's West End in early 2012, having toured the UK during 2011,
- David Hoylake-Johnston in the 2011 UK tour of The Reluctant Debutante,
- Silva Vacarro in Tennessee Williams' Tiger Tail,
- Phillips in Alan Bennett's Single Spies at the Watermill Theatre.

He has produced

- Lewis in Wonderland (a biographical play about Lewis Carroll performed at the Edinburgh Fringe Festival.)
- Drowning (a short film)
- Pudding Bowl.(a short film)

Clarke works as Head of Drama at Sussex House School, Chelsea.

== Personal life ==
Clarke is married to Northern Ireland-born actress Valene Kane.

== Filmography ==
Year	Title	Role	Notes
2010	Spooks	British Scientist	1 episode
2013	Whitechapel	Mark Hooper	1 episode
2014	Downton Abbey	Tim Grey	1 episode
2017	Father Brown	Robert Malmort	Episode: The Labyrinth of the Minotaur
2017	The Crown	Jeremy Fry	2 episodes
2018	Intrigo: Death of an Author	Thomas Neumann-Hansen	
2019	Doctors	Steve Bingham	Episode: The Lottery
2019	Intrigo: Dear Agnes	Thomas Neuman-Hansen	
2021	The King's Man	Admiralty Military Intel Officer	
