= List of awards and nominations received by Kelsey Grammer =

Kelsey Grammer awards and nominations
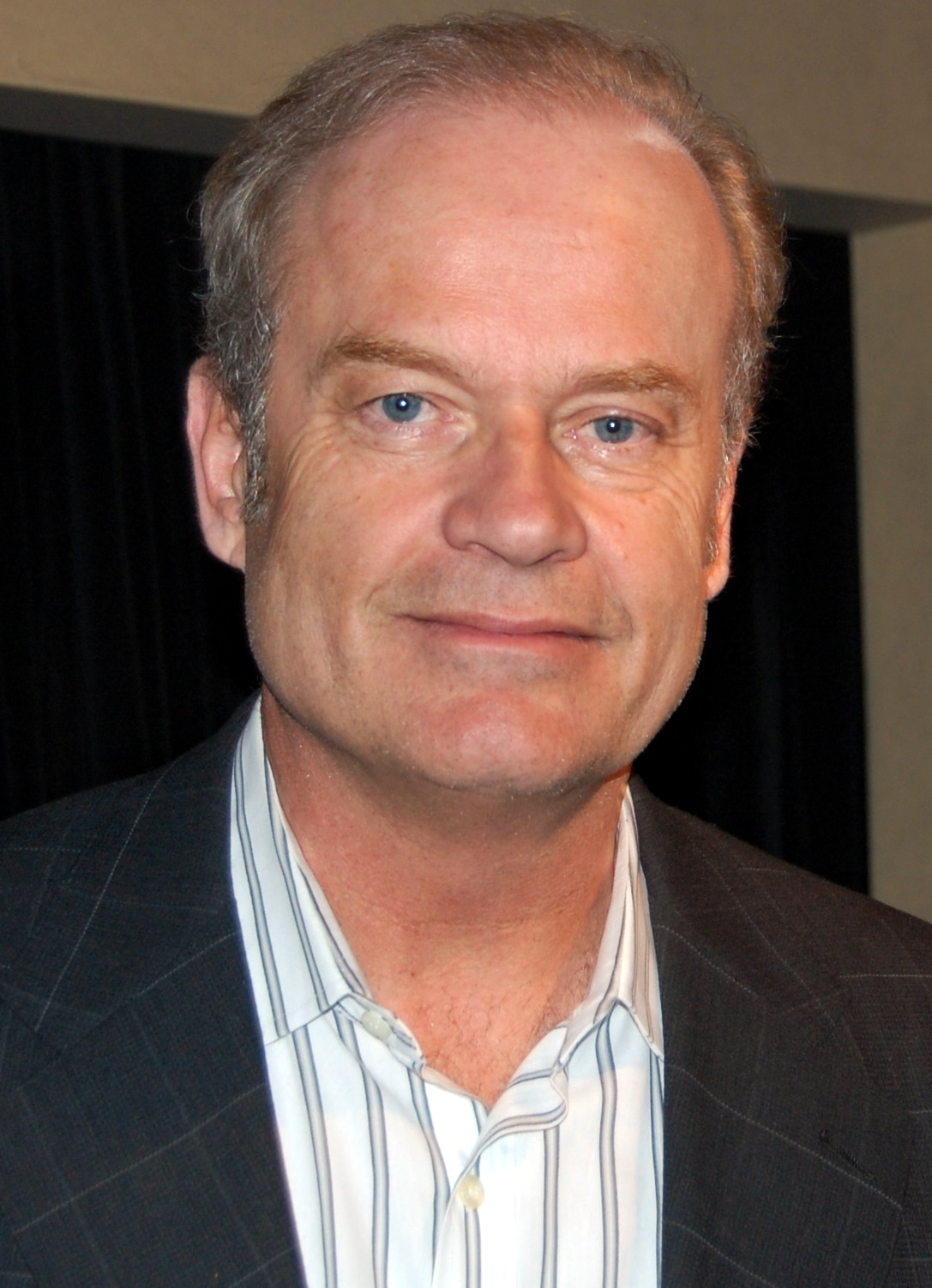
- Grammer in 2010
Awards and nominations
Award	Wins	Nominations
Emmy Awards	6	18
Golden Globes	3	9
SAG Awards	1	18
Tony Awards	1	2

Totals (Note: Certain award groups do not simply award one winner. They acknowledge several different recipients, have runners-up, and have third place. Since this is a specific recognition and is different from losing an award, runner-up mentions are considered wins in this award tally. For simplification and to avoid errors, each award in this list has been presumed to have had a prior nomination.)
- Wins: 26
- Nominations: 102

The following is a list of awards and nominations received by Kelsey Grammer.

Kelsey Grammer is known for his roles on stage and screen. Throughout his career, Grammer has been honored with various accolades including six Primetime Emmy Awards, three Golden Globe Awards, a Screen Actors Guild Award and a Tony Award.

Grammer grained stardom for his role as an intelligent but haughty psychiatrist Dr. Frasier Crane. He has played the role since 1984 starting on the NBC sitcom Cheers (1984–1993), in a guest role in the sitcom Wings (1992), and then the successful spinoff series Frasier (1993–2004). For the role he earned widespread acclaim and numerous accolades including four Primetime Emmy Awards for Outstanding Lead Actor in a Comedy Series in 1994, 1995, 1998 and 2004, two Golden Globe Awards for Best Lead Actor in a Television Series - Comedy or Musical in 1996 and 2001, and a Screen Actors Guild Award for Outstanding Performance by an Ensemble in a Comedy Series in 2000. He was previously Emmy nominated for two Outstanding Supporting Actor in a Comedy Series for Cheers and Outstanding Lead Actor in a Comedy Series for Wings.

Grammer took a dramatic role as a corrupt mayor of Chicago in the Starz political drama series Boss (2011–2012), for which he won the Golden Globe Award for Best Actor – Television Series Drama and was nominated for the Critics' Choice Television Award for Best Actor in a Drama Series. Since 1990, Grammer has lent his voice to the Fox animated series The Simpsons playing Sideshow Bob earning the Primetime Emmy Award for Outstanding Voice-Over Performance in 2006. He also voiced a role in the Netflix animated series Trollhunters: Tales of Arcadia (2016–2018) earning the Daytime Emmy Award for Outstanding Performer in an Animated Program in 2017.

On stage, he Grammer started his career in Broadway revivals of the William Shakespeare plays Macbeth (1981) and Othello (1982). He acted in the original off Broadway production of the Stephen Sondheim musical Sunday in the Park with George (1983). He played the title role in a Los Angeles production of Sweeney Todd: The Demon Barber of Fleet Street (1999) and a Lincoln Center production of My Fair Lady (2007). He returned to Broadway playing half of a gay couple in the French musical comedy La Cage aux Folles (2010–2011) for which he was nominated for the Tony Award for Best Featured Actor in a Play. He played Captain Hook in the musical Finding Neverland (2015–2016) earning a Drama League Award nomination. He served as a producer on the musical The Color Purple (2016) for which he won the Tony Award for Best Revival of a Musical.

== Major associations ==
=== Critics' Choice Awards ===
0 wins of 1 nomination

Year	Category	Nominated work	Result	Ref.
Critics' Choice Television Award
2012	Best Lead Actor in a Drama Series	Boss	Nominated	

=== Emmy Awards ===
5 wins of 17 nominations

Year	Category	Nominated work	Result	Ref.
1988	Outstanding Supporting Actor in a Comedy Series	Cheers (Episode: The Crane Mutiny)	Nominated	
1990	Outstanding Supporting Actor in a Comedy Series	Cheers (Episode: The Stork Brings a Crane)	Nominated	
1992	Outstanding Guest Actor in a Comedy Series	Wings (Episode: Planes, Trains and Visiting Cranes)	Nominated	
1994	Outstanding Lead Actor in a Comedy Series	Frasier Episode: The Good Son)	Won	
1995	Outstanding Lead Actor in a Comedy Series	Frasier (Episode: The Adventures in Paradise, Part 2)	Won	
1996	Outstanding Lead Actor in a Comedy Series	Frasier (Episode: You Can Go Home Again)	Nominated	
1997	Outstanding Lead Actor in a Comedy Series	Frasier (Episode: Ham Radio)	Nominated	
1998	Outstanding Lead Actor in a Comedy Series	Frasier (Episode: Frasier's Imaginary Friend)	Won	
1999	Outstanding Lead Actor in a Comedy Series	Frasier (Episode: Merry Christmas, Mrs. Moskowitz)	Nominated	
1999	Outstanding Comedy Series	Frasier	Nominated	
2000	Outstanding Comedy Series	Frasier	Nominated	
2000	Outstanding Lead Actor in a Comedy Series	Frasier (Episode: Radio Wars)	Nominated	
2001	Outstanding Comedy Series	Frasier	Nominated	
2001	Outstanding Lead Actor in a Comedy Series	Frasier (Episode: Frasier's Edge)	Nominated	
2002	Outstanding Lead Actor in a Comedy Series	Frasier (Episode: The Love You Fake)	Nominated	
2004	Outstanding Lead Actor in a Comedy Series	Frasier (Episode: The Doctor is Out)	Won	
2006	Outstanding Voice-Over Performance	The Simpsons (Episode: The Italian Bob)	Won	
Daytime Emmy Awards
2017	Outstanding Performer in an Animated Program	Trollhunters: Tales of Arcadia	Won	(Note: Numerous sources:)

=== Golden Globe Awards ===
3 wins of 9 nominations

Year	Category	Nominated work	Result	Ref.
1994	Best Actor – Television Series Musical or Comedy	Frasier	Nominated	
1995	Best Actor – Television Series Musical or Comedy	Frasier	Nominated	
1996	Best Actor – Television Series Musical or Comedy	Frasier	Won	
1997	Best Actor – Television Series Musical or Comedy	Frasier	Nominated	
1998	Best Actor – Television Series Musical or Comedy	Frasier	Nominated	
1999	Best Actor – Television Series Musical or Comedy	Frasier	Nominated	
2001	Best Actor – Television Series Musical or Comedy	Frasier	Won	
2002	Best Actor – Television Series Musical or Comedy	Frasier	Nominated	
2012	Best Actor – Television Series Drama	Boss	Won	

=== Screen Actors Guild Awards ===
1 win of 18 nominations

Year	Category	Nominated work	Result	Ref.
1994	Outstanding Male Actor in a Comedy Series	Frasier	Nominated	
1994	Outstanding Ensemble in a Comedy Series	Frasier	Nominated	
1995	Outstanding Male Actor in a Comedy Series	Frasier	Nominated	
1995	Outstanding Ensemble in a Comedy Series	Frasier	Nominated	
1996	Outstanding Male Actor in a Comedy Series	Frasier	Nominated	
1996	Outstanding Ensemble in a Comedy Series	Frasier	Nominated	
1997	Outstanding Male Actor in a Comedy Series	Frasier	Nominated	
1997	Outstanding Ensemble in a Comedy Series	Frasier	Nominated	
1998	Outstanding Male Actor in a Comedy Series	Frasier	Nominated	
1998	Outstanding Ensemble in a Comedy Series	Frasier	Nominated	
1999	Outstanding Male Actor in a Comedy Series	Frasier	Nominated	
1999	Outstanding Ensemble in a Comedy Series	Frasier	Won	
2000	Outstanding Male Actor in a Comedy Series	Frasier	Nominated	
2000	Outstanding Ensemble in a Comedy Series	Frasier	Nominated	
2001	Outstanding Male Actor in a Comedy Series	Frasier	Nominated	
2001	Outstanding Ensemble in a Comedy Series	Frasier	Nominated	
2002	Outstanding Ensemble in a Comedy Series	Frasier	Nominated	
2003	Outstanding Ensemble in a Comedy Series	Frasier	Nominated	

=== Tony Award ===
1 wins of 2 nominations

Year	Category	Nominated work	Result	Ref.
2010	Best Actor in a Musical	La Cage aux Folles	Nominated	
2016	Best Revival of a Musical	The Color Purple (As producer)	Won	

== Miscellaneous awards ==
Organizations	Year	Category	Nominated work	Result	Ref.
American Comedy Awards	1995	Funniest Lead Actor in a Television Series	Frasier	Won	
American Comedy Awards	1996	Funniest Lead Actor in a Television Series	Frasier	Won	
American Comedy Awards	1999	Funniest Lead Actor in a Television Series	Frasier	Nominated	
American Comedy Awards	2001	Funniest Lead Actor in a Television Series	Frasier	Nominated	
Banff Television Festival	2001	Sir Peter Ustinov Award	Kesley Grammer	Won	
Directors Guild Awards	1999	Outstanding Directorial Achievement in Comedy Series	Frasier	Nominated	
Drama League Award	2015	Distinguished Performance	Finding Neverland	Nominated	
Golden Raspberry Awards	2015	Worst Supporting Actor	The Expendables 3 / Legends of Oz; Think Like a Man Too / Transformers: Age of Extinction	Won	
MovieGuide Awards	2005	Most Inspiring Television Acting	A Christmas Carol: The Musical	Nominated	
People's Choice Awards	1994	Favorite Male Performer in a New Television Series	Frasier	Won	
People's Choice Awards	1999	Favorite Male Television Performer	Frasier	Nominated	
People's Choice Awards	2002	Favorite Male Television Performer	Frasier	Won	
Saturn Awards	2007	Best Supporting Actor	X-Men: The Last Stand	Nominated	
Satellite Awards	1998	Best Lead Actor in a Series - Comedy or Musical	Frasier	Won	
Satellite Awards	1999	Best Lead Actor in a Series - Comedy or Musical	Frasier	Nominated	
Satellite Awards	2002	Best Lead Actor in a Series - Comedy or Musical	Frasier	Won	
Television Critics Association Awards	1997	Individual Achievement in Comedy	Frasier	Nominated	
Television Critics Association Awards	1999	Individual Achievement in Comedy	Frasier	Nominated	
Teen Choice Awards	2014	Choice Movie - Villain	Transformers: Age of Extinction	Nominated	
TV Guide Awards	|2001	Actor of the Year in a Comedy Series	Frasier	Nominated	
TV Land Awards	2005	Classic Television Broadcaster of the Year	Frasier	Nominated	
TV Land Awards	2006	Broadcaster of the Year	Frasier	Nominated	
Viewers for Quality Television Awards	1991	Best Supporting Actor in a Quality Comedy Series	Cheers	Nominated	
Viewers for Quality Television Awards	1994	Best Lead Actor in a Quality Comedy Series	Frasier	Nominated	
Viewers for Quality Television Awards	1995	Best Lead Actor in a Quality Comedy Series	Frasier	Won	
Viewers for Quality Television Awards	1996	Best Lead Actor in a Quality Comedy Series	Frasier	Won	
Viewers for Quality Television Awards	1997	Best Lead Actor in a Quality Comedy Series	Frasier	Won	
Viewers for Quality Television Awards	1998	Best Lead Actor in a Quality Comedy Series	Frasier	Won	
Viewers for Quality Television Awards	1999	Best Lead Actor in a Quality Comedy Series	Frasier	Nominated	
Viewers for Quality Television Awards	2000	Best Lead Actor in a Quality Comedy Series	Frasier	Nominated	

== Honorary awards ==
=== Walk of Fame ===
1 win of 1 nomination

Year	Category	Title	Results	Ref.
2001	Star on the Walk of Fame (Note: Star given for his work on Television, which is located at 7021 Hollywood, Blvd.)	Kelsey Grammer	Won	
