= Johnston Center for Integrative Studies =

Unit of the University of Redlands, California

View from the balcony of Bekins Hall across the University quad towards California Hall

The Johnston Center for Integrative Studies, formerly Johnston Center for Individualized Learning, is an alternative education program offered by the University of Redlands in Redlands, California. The Johnston Center focuses on interdisciplinary education where students design the curriculum for their personal program of study. Students have the ability to re-negotiate the content of courses they take, and to create courses of their own. They write a self-evaluation at the end of each semester and receive narrative evaluations rather than grades. Community interaction is emphasized in its residential housing, having two specifically allotted dorm buildings that students enrolled in the program have priority choice over.

== History of Johnston ==
=== Johnston College ===
==== Planning Phase and Opening ====
Conceived as the first of a planned experimental "cluster college" in 1965, University of Redlands Trustee Dwayne Orton reportedly "persuaded" James Graham Johnston of IBM to "contribute his name and $1,750,000" as an endowment. University of Redlands President George Armacost stated in 1968 that the college's purpose would be "to prepare students to live in a democratic society by teaching them to perform in a democratic way." Plans were drawn up to build new dorms that were structured specifically to facilitate peer interaction. The trustees then hired Dr. Pressley McCoy as the first Chancellor, who viewed its governance as a blend between the decentralized Claremont consortium and centralized University of California, Santa Cruz. McCoy stated there would be no grades given or internal departments within Johnston.

Opening on 2 September 1969 "with no common graduation requirements" and 182 students, James Graham Johnston College was part of a larger social trend in higher education to shift away from conformity. Instead, graduation requirements would be negotiated with each student during their sophomore year with a committee made up of other students and faculty, submitted by a written proposal. Many initial faculty were T-group leaders following Carl Rogers' theory of the process. The first 10 days of the college took place at a camp called Pilgrim Pines where everyone formed "Grok Groups". In 1971 the Vice-Chancellor, E. K. Williams, responded to criticism by Sociologist Robert Nisbet over whether "individuality" is something a college should make its own directive. Accredited in 1973 by the Western Association of Schools and Colleges in an "unusually commendatory" report, Johnston became the first experimental cluster college to be so. They described how students and faculty cooperate together on "responsibility for the conduct of the course" in creating what was considered a "medium of contractual learning". The college had no required courses to transfer in, and students would receive a narrative evaluation by professors rather than a letter grade.

Considered a part of the Free Speech Movement by author Frank Moore, Johnston would conflict with the main University throughout its existence. Initial disputes involved whether the independent board could hire faculty without the university president approving, and whether students could live coeducationally. Despite being namesake James G. Johnston's own choice of chancellor, McCoy would be dismissed by the University's board of trustees in January 1971, resulting in about 100 students protesting and discussing a possible relocation to Lone Mountain College. In July the University announced it would finally begin relaxing its sex-segregated dorm rules in three buildings, two of them being Johnston's, while denying it was an attempt to appease students dismayed at McCoy's firing. Beyond internal struggles, within its first few months Johnston college students would also receive their own city parade permits to protest in the streets of Redlands as part of the national Vietnam Moratorium movement.

==== Established Presence ====
The college had close connections with the University campus MEChA, voting unanimously in 1973 to establish a culture center for the "Chicano Culture Center Committee" to manage on Johnston property. Cultural celebrations were held in collaboration with both organizations for holidays such as Cinco De Mayo. The college would also sponsor its own workshops to raise awareness of issues faced by Chicano people, even diverging from the University's vote to purchase non-union lettuce in 1975. Racial discrimination was still felt by students identifying as Black, leading to committees being formed to "research the charges" in March, 1974. Later that month about 90 students marched through buildings, both Johnston and Redlands, arguing that the recommendations by the committees weren't being followed through. Kwame Ture would be sponsored by the University's Black Students Union to come speak in 1978.

Prescott College, another experimental attempt at higher education, had an arrangement where students would receive degrees through Johnston since Prescott hadn't been accredited yet. Johnston also had a formal agreement with the Riverside Probation Department to fund and provide supervised student counselors assisting juveniles. It was reportedly the first institution to have undergraduates work with the United Nations for half-year terms. University Without Walls was a program starting in 1973 that helped older adults who were too busy to spend much time on campus get an accelerated degree. The college was also planning to offer graduate programs, with a master of science in commutative disorders beginning a pilot run in 1974.

The National Institute of Mental Health awarded grants in 1972 and 1977 to study how the non-traditional environment impacted student development. Collected data showed that Johnston College students were much more likely to seek therapy, with 43% of graduates surveyed reporting as such. This was assumed to be related to the group sessions Johnston encouraged, facilitating a positive view on psychotherapy generally. Although respondents indicated varying satisfaction levels with the community culture, rating "concepts as fellow students, social life, community meetings, freshman orientation, and curriculum building", there was no significant difference among views of academic quality. Johnston college was able to maintain its enrollment rate in 1974, avoiding the trend of falling university enrollment nationwide. However, by this year most students were reportedly reliant on scholarships or other financial aid due to the high cost of tuition.

In their 1978 book, Grant and Riesman considered the environment to be embodying a "communal-expressive" movement.

=== Johnston Center ===
Entrance to Bekins Hall, fliers are posted around announcing University events and Johnston collectives

The University finally reorganized itself into a group of colleges in 1976, which included both Johnston College and the new College of Arts and Sciences. In 1979 Johnston College would officially merge with the College of Arts and Sciences, having reportedly retained a "contractual obligation" to allow the same experimental academics. The graduate and off-campus student programs became part of other departments, making the new Johnston Center only for on-campus undergraduates. It was considered for closure during a hard economic period in 1980, but survived as "enrollment at Johnston slowly grew", making it an outlier.

According to the Fiske Guide to Colleges, as recently as 2018 "Johnston undergrads have higher test scores, with average SATs that are 50 to 75 points above the Redlands median." From 2017 to 2020 the center hosted Race on Campus: A Student Conference, which organized sessions on "inclusive curriculum, police brutality, cultural appropriation of Native American culture in higher education, activism, mixed-race experience on campus and Islamophobia." In the midst of the 2024 United States Presidential Election campaign, Johnston hosted its own "Johnston National Convention" to register students to vote. In 2025 the center hosted the International Green Industry Hall of Fame (IGIHOF) as part of the "Green Future Forum" on sustainability.

A study published in 2023 by Johnston alumni Karlin-Neumann and Kramer interviewed about 50 alums, and surveyed over 100 others who attended either Johnston college or the center. The purpose was to determine how the experimental educational experience "shaped the civic and social practices of alumni". Though the authors admitted to being skewed towards graduates who enjoyed their time, and therefore were more likely to be participants in the study, results showed the specific alumni population analyzed had increased "commitment to participate in or organize democratic communities across differences".

Vintage Johnston Wine Dinner was an annual fundraising event for the Johnston Center Student Project Fund. The dorm buildings, Bekins Hall and Bekins-Holt Hall, have had renovations thanks to other fundraising; Holt in particular becoming ADA compliant in 2024. A student-run cafe served breakfast options in Bekins Hall to the public between 8am and 2pm. It was originally a word-study position before budget cuts removed it, and a Johnston professor organized it as a class. In 2026 Bekins was closed for ongoing repairs after students organized to raise awareness of living conditions. Since the early 2000's Johnston's bathrooms have been gender neutral.

Then-Director of the Johnston Center, Kelly Hankin, after meeting with University officials shortly before Bekins Hall's 2026 closure

== Living-Learning Community ==
=== Consensus Politics ===
Every week is a "community meeting" where both students and faculty come together and democratically decide on how to "create semester budgets, deal with social issues like theft and kitchen etiquette, and discuss greater university policies". While analyzing various adaptive approaches to liberal arts education, University of Michigan professor Earl Lewis states that Johnston students "take pride in integrative learning" and "connect with their surrounding communities". At graduation students may pick anyone they want to give a short speech about them, and one tradition involves a champagne toast to close out the year.

In a 1981 article, Johnston College cofounder Yasuyuki Owada reflected on how much of a surprise it was to see students identifying the environment with "individualized learning" when the intention was to form a community. Sociologist Robert Nisbet even criticized the college in 1971 as one of many new "cult of individuality"s focused on appealing to "the children of the white middle class." Though he suggested students should, in addition to academics, learn "by rubbing shoulders, with one another especially but also with faculty", a 2023 study found Johnston alumni from both the college and center tended to feel autonomy and community "mutually reinforce each other." The Johnston Center holds its student dorms and faculty offices within the same two buildings as a means of overcoming any "symbolic" boundaries, causing "spatial transgressions" to occur regularly. A contract with the University allows Johnston residents to design and decorate their nonpublic spaces, essentially any area but the first floors, however they wish.

=== Academics ===
Johnston classes have no general syllabus, but are individually tailored to each student based on a "course contract" agreed upon by professor and student. At the end of the semester students continue to receive a narrative evaluation of their performance in the course rather than a grade, and submit their own evaluation of the professor in turn like during the college years. The program's academic freedom comes with an incentive to form an interdisciplinary, or integrative, curriculum. Operating within "consensus decision-making processes", students in their second year still negotiate with a committee composed of other students and faculty to form a "graduation contract", personalizing each student's requirements for completing their degree. Rather than a major, they are working towards developing what is called an "emphasis." The term "breadth" is used to refer to the "broad areas" of study that the student-faculty committee may be looking for in a negotiating student's desired curriculum.

The Johnston Center Student Project Fund helps students expand possible research opportunities, art exhibition and production, as well as just travel. Any student from the University of Redlands may register for a Johnston class whether they are in the program or not, and students in Johnston may register for any other academic department's course.

== Notable alumni ==
- Lynne Isbell (born 1955), primatologist
- Daniel Petrie Jr. (born November 30, 1951), screenwriter for Beverly Hills Cop
