= Colleges That Change Lives =

College educational guide

- First edition
- Author: Loren Pope, first three editions Revised by Hilary Masell Oswald (2013-2014 edition)
- Language: English
- Genre: Education
- Publisher: Penguin Books
- Publication date: 1996 (first edition)
- Publication place: United States
- ISBN: 0-14-303736-6
- OCLC: 65341249
- Dewey Decimal: 378.73 22
- LC Class: L901 .P58 2006

Colleges That Change Lives
- Founded: 1998; 28 years ago
- Website: www.ctcl.org

Colleges That Change Lives began as a college educational guide first published by Loren Pope in 1996, that went through three editions prior to his death in 2008. The fourth and final edition, revised by Hilary Masell Oswald, was released in 2012.

The current non-profit, 501(c)(3), Colleges That Change Lives (CTCL) which was founded in 1998, is based on Pope's books.

== Background ==
=== CTCL: The book ===
Colleges That Change Lives began as a book that served as a guide to Pope's categorization of specific colleges in the United States. It was first published in 1996, with a second edition in 2000, and a third edition in 2006. The final fourth edition (2013-2014) was published in 2012 after Pope's death, and was revised by Hilary Masell Oswald. The fourth edition profiles 40 choices for colleges and universities that, "have one primary mission: educate the undergraduate. Each appeals to a slightly different type of teenager, but they all share a mission to raise students' trajectories and develop thinkers, leaders, and moral citizens. The little-known truth is that these colleges have been on the cutting edge of higher education for decades. Many of them have outperformed most of the ranking sweethearts in the percentages of graduates who become America's scientists and scholars."

=== CTCL: The non-profit ===
Colleges That Change Lives, Inc. (CTCL) was founded in 1998 as an expansion of Pope's books. It was established two years after the first edition and "independent of Mr. Pope (although with his blessing) and his publisher." It is recognized as a non-profit, 501(c)(3). According to the CTCL website:

Our Mission: Colleges That Change Lives, Inc. (CTCL) is a non-profit organization dedicated to the advancement and support of a student-centered college search process. We support the goal of every student finding a college that develops a lifelong love of learning and provides the foundation for a successful and fulfilling life beyond college.

Colleges that Change Lives Inc. (CTCL) was established to "as a way to keep Loren Pope's message alive." It is governed by a voluntary board of college counseling professionals. After the publication of the first edition of the book, the colleges "began working together as a group of like-minded schools." A few years later, the non-profit was founded with Pope's approval. Then in 2012, Pope's family "hired Hilary Masell Oswald to revise the book again. She identified four more schools, and the organization invited them to join CTCL."

== List of currently active schools from the 2013-2014 edition ==
Northeast

- Allegheny College — Meadville, Pennsylvania
- Clark University — Worcester, Massachusetts
- Juniata College — Huntingdon, Pennsylvania
- Ursinus College — Collegeville, Pennsylvania

Mid-Atlantic

- Emory & Henry University — Emory, Virginia (previously Emory and Henry College)
- Goucher College — Towson, Maryland
- University of Lynchburg — Lynchburg, Virginia (previously Lynchburg College)
- McDaniel College — Westminster, Maryland
- St. John's College — Annapolis, Maryland

South

- Agnes Scott College — Decatur, Georgia
- Centre College — Danville, Kentucky
- Eckerd College — St. Petersburg, Florida
- Guilford College — Greensboro, North Carolina
- Hendrix College — Conway, Arkansas
- Millsaps College — Jackson, Mississippi
- Rhodes College — Memphis, Tennessee

Midwest

- Beloit College — Beloit, Wisconsin
- Cornell College — Mount Vernon, Iowa
- Denison University — Granville, Ohio
- Earlham College — Richmond, Indiana
- Hillsdale College — Hillsdale, Michigan
- Hiram College — Hiram, Ohio
- Hope College — Holland, Michigan
- Kalamazoo College — Kalamazoo, Michigan
- Knox College — Galesburg, Illinois
- Lawrence University — Appleton, Wisconsin
- Ohio Wesleyan University — Delaware, Ohio
- St. Olaf College — Northfield, Minnesota
- Wabash College — Crawfordsville, Indiana
- Wheaton College — Wheaton, Illinois
- The College of Wooster — Wooster, Ohio

Southwest

- Austin College — Sherman, Texas
- St. John's College — Santa Fe, New Mexico
- Southwestern University — Georgetown, Texas

West/Northwest

- University of Puget Sound — Tacoma, Washington
- Reed College — Portland, Oregon
- Saint Mary's College of California — Moraga, California
- Whitman College — Walla Walla, Washington
- Willamette University — Salem, Oregon

== Current list of CTCL schools ==
The current CTCL list contains most, but not all, of the colleges from the 2013 edition, and places both branches of St. John's College under one listing. In addition, it restored The Evergreen State College and Antioch College which were included in earlier editions of the book, and Bard College, which was in the 1996 edition.

CTCL has also added colleges that were not included in the original books: DePauw University and Oberlin College and Conservatory in 2024, and University of Redlands in 2025.

Northwest

- The Evergreen State College — Olympia, Washington

Northeast

- Bard College — Annandale-on-Hudson, New York

Midwest

- Antioch College — Yellow Springs, Ohio
- DePauw University — Greencastle, Indiana
- Oberlin College and Conservatory — Oberlin, Ohio

Southwest

- University of Redlands — Redlands, California (includes Woodbury University)

== Delisted or closed/closing ==
These colleges appeared in one or more of the original books, but are now either closed, in the process of closing, or are no longer a part of CTCL.

- Birmingham-Southern College — Birmingham, Alabama (now closed)
- Hampshire College — Amherst, Massachusetts (will permanently close at the end of Fall 2026, no longer accepting students)
- Marlboro College — Marlboro, Vermont (now closed)
- New College of Florida — Sarasota, Florida (no longer part of the CTCL schools)

== Four editions ==
- Pope, Loren (1996). Colleges That Change Lives:40 Schools You Should Know About Even If You're Not A Straight - A Student. Penguin Books. ISBN 0-14023951-0.
- Pope, Loren (2000). Colleges That Change Lives:40 Schools You Should Know About Even If You're Not A Straight - A Student (Revised ed.). Penguin Books. ISBN 0-14029616-6.
- Pope, Loren (2006). Colleges That Change Lives:40 Schools That Will Change the Way You Think About Colleges (Fully Revised for 2006-2007). Penguin Books. ISBN 9780143037361.
- Pope, Loren; Oswald, Hilary Masell (2012). Colleges That Change Lives:40 Schools That Will Change the Way You Think About Colleges (2013-2014 ed.). Penguin Books. ISBN 978-0143122302.

== See also ==
- List of alternative colleges and universities
- Narrative evaluation
