= Go with Me =

2008 novel by Castle Freeman Jr.

- First edition cover
- Author: Castle Freeman Jr.
- Publisher: Steerforth
- Publication date: January 15, 2008
- ISBN: 978-1-58642-139-7

Go with Me is a 2008 novel by American writer Castle Freeman Jr. It is Castle Freeman's third novel and it was first published by Steerforth Press in January 2008.

== Plot summary ==
This 160-page novel is set in backwoods Vermont where the local villain, Blackway, is making life hellish for Lillian, a young woman from outside the area. Her boyfriend has fled the state in fear, and local law enforcement can do nothing to protect her. She resolves to stand her ground, and to fight back. Lillian enlists the powerful brute Nate and the wily old-timer Lester to take the fight to her tormenter whilst an eccentric Greek chorus of locals ponders her likely fate.

== Background ==
The novel was inspired by Thomas Malory's King Arthur Tales, specifically "The Tale of Sir Gareth of Orkney".

== Publication history ==
- Go with Me. Hanover: Steerforth Press. 2008. ISBN 978-1-58642-139-7. OCLC 154705171.
- Go with Me. New York: Harper Perennial. 2009. ISBN 978-0-06-167185-2. OCLC 232977744.
- Go with Me. London: Duckworth Overlook. 2009. ISBN 978-0-7156-3835-4.

== Reception ==
According to Kirkus Reviews, "If all novels were this good, Americans would read more."

The Wall Street Journal called Go with Me "a novel with echoes of Deliverance and Cormac McCarthy," and goes on to praise the author for capturing "the feel of played-out Vermont towns and people, his dialogue has a terse, almost humorous, cadence." People agreed, writing that "Freeman has a flawless ear for dialogue and a sharp eye for quirky detail."

O: The Oprah Magazine called it an "elegant little thriller about cunning versus cruelty...This is a meticulous New England miniature, with not a wasted word."

The Boston Globe called it "a gem that sparkles with sly insight and cuts like a knife", while Matthew Lewin of The Guardian similarly wrote, "This unusual little gem of a book is part comic romp and part nail-biting thriller" and concluded that "Castle Freeman writes with both wit and a deep understanding of the human psyche, and he does not cheat us out of a dramatic climax."

== Adaptation ==
The 2016 film Blackway is based on the book. The film was previously known as Go with Me and was released in some markets with that title.
