= A Haunting at Silver Falls =

- Promotional film poster
- Directed by: Brett Donowho
- Written by: Cam Cannon; Rachel Long; Brian Pittman
- Produced by: Rick Dugdale
- Starring: Alix Elizabeth Gitter; Steve Bacic; Tara Westwood; Erick Avari
- Cinematography: Edd Lukas
- Edited by: Ryan Eaton; Tim Mirkovich
- Music by: Nathan Vann Walton
- Production companies: Enderby Entertainment; Tony-Seven Films
- Distributed by: Inception Media Group
- Release date: May 28, 2013
- Running time: 96 minutes
- Country: United States
- Language: English
- Budget: $2.5 million

A Haunting at Silver Falls is a 2013 American horror film directed by Brett Donowho. The film was released on May 28, 2013, and stars Alix Elizabeth Gitter as a young woman that must uncover the true murderer of a heinous crime before she becomes a victim herself. It is very loosely based upon a true story Donowho read about two murdered twins.

== Plot ==
A girl, Heather Dhal, runs through the woods, pursued by an unknown assailant. She is caught and her hand, which is wearing a ring, is chopped off and left in the woods while her body is dragged away.

Twenty years later, recently orphaned teen Jordan and her boyfriend Larry go to a party. While there, Larry buys drugs from a classmate, Robbie, and tells Jordan about supposed hauntings in the town. The party is broken up by the cops and everyone flees into the woods, resulting in Larry and Jordan getting separated. While looking for Larry, Jordan finds Heather’s ring and puts it on. Robbie finds her, informs her that Larry got caught by the police, and drives her home. Jordan tries to take the ring off before going to bed but finds it stuck. That night, Heather’s ghost haunts her and attempts to take the ring.

The next morning, Jordan tries to contact Larry, only to find out his father, a local psychiatrist, Dr. Parrish, has grounded him and forbids the two from spending time together, believing Jordan to be a bad influence on his son. That night, when Jordan goes to bed, Heather comes back and again attempts to take the ring, and Jordan dreams of seeing Heather running through the woods. Jordan wakes up and discovers her finger covered in saliva and bite marks. As she washes the saliva off, she also notices her feet are covered in dirt.

The next morning, Anne, Jordan's aunt and current guardian, informs Jordan that her scarf has gone missing. Jordan asks about her mother, who was Anne’s sister. At school, Jordan is pursued by Robbie, although she rejects him, and meets back up with Larry, whom she confides in about the ring. Larry helps her try to get it off and is seemingly successful, but the ring appears back on Jordan’s finger. When she gets home, Anne and Kevin, Jordan's uncle, reveal that they found the missing scarf and some missing cash in Jordan’s room, and that they’ve received files disclosing her past as a teen criminal. Although Jordan tries to defend herself, they tell her that they’re going to have her start seeing Dr. Parrish. To keep her out of trouble on their date night, they lock her in the bathroom. While they are out, the ghost of Heather’s sister, Holly Dhal, attacks Jordan and attempts to drown her. Anne and Kevin arrive home and find Jordan in time to save her.

The next morning, Jordan discovers that Holly is now following her. Jordan has her appointment with Dr. Parrish, although evades his questions. At school, Robbie again tries to hit on Jordan, although is interrupted by Larry. Jordan and Larry go to the town’s cemetery, where Jordan reveals that her mother drowned herself when she was five and that she has been seeing a ghost. She and Larry then follow Holly, who leads them to a bar where it is being announced on TV that Wyatt Dhal, Holly and Heather’s dad, will be executed later that night for murdering them. Anne, Kevin, Dr. Parrish, and Sheriff O’Leary, Robbie’s dad, arrive at the bar and take Jordan away, having been alerted to the situation by Larry.

Back at the Parrish household, Jordan is told about the Dhal sisters and the legends surrounding them. The twins were murdered by their father, Wyatt Dhal. After their deaths, girls in town kept seeing the twins' ghosts and some committed suicide because of it. Others were cured after speaking with Wyatt. Jordan is taken to speak with Wyatt, where he tells her about the last time he saw his daughters when they were boarding a school bus and informs her of the significance of the rings. When he learns that Jordan has Heather’s ring, he gives her his own and advises her to listen to what the girls have to tell her. Jordan puts on the other ring, leaving only Holly’s left to find.

Jordan returns home and asks Anne for some sleeping medication. As soon as she is left alone, she exits the house and boards a school bus outside, which drops her off deep in the woods. There, the Dhal twins appear and inform Jordan that she’s next. Jordan then wakes up, revealing the experience to have been a dream.

That day, Anne has to go into town and leaves Jordan and Kevin at home. Jordan learns how to chop wood with Kevin, but abandons the project when Holly appears and warns her to leave. Jordan prepares to run away, writing a note, packing clothes, and attempting to steal money from Anne and Kevin. As she’s looking for valuable jewelry, however, she comes across Holly’s ring in Anne’s jewelry box, along with photos of the girls. Anne catches her and knocks her out.

Jordan wakes up bound and gagged in the house’s basement that night. Anne and Kevin discuss how to kill her, revealing themselves to be the murderers, and having also killed the girls who supposedly committed suicide. Larry arrives and asks to apologize to Jordan for ratting her out but is sent home by Anne and Kevin. As he’s leaving, he overhears them talk about buying supplies to kill Jordan with and realizes what’s going on.

While Anne is buying the supplies, Kevin frees Jordan and tells her to escape. She attempts to, only to realize Kevin is playing with her and intends to rape her before Anne kills her. While taunting Jordan, Kevin reveals that he and Anne were also responsible for her mother’s death, causing Jordan to lash out and attack him. Larry arrives and, together, they subdue Kevin and later Anne when she arrives home. They tie the two up, put the Dhals’ rings on them, and leave them in the basement. When Anne and Kevin wake up, the Dhal twins get their revenge.

== Cast ==
- Alix Elizabeth Gitter as Jordan
- Erick Avari as Dr. Parrish
- Steve Bacic as Kevin Sanders
- James C. Burns as Wyatt Dahl
- James Cavlo as Larry
- Tadhg Kelly as Robbie
- James Ralph as Sheriff O'Leary
- Jade Ramsey as Heather Dahl
- Nikita Ramsey as Holly Dahl
- Tara Westwood as Anne Sanders

== Reception ==
NOW Toronto gave a mostly negative review for A Haunting at Silver Falls, writing that it "isn't wildly scary, but its slightly unusual take on the ghost story gives it a memorable creepiness." DVD Verdict and JoBlo.com both gave mixed reviews, as both felt that while it wasn't a particularly good film it did have some merits and would appeal to some viewers.

== Sequel ==
In June 2019 a sequel to the 2013 film entitled A Haunting at Silver Falls: The Return was released to DVD, On Demand, and digital. Several actors returned to reprise their roles from the first film such as Jade and Nikita Ramsey, however Alix Elizabeth Gitter did not return to the film and the role of Jordan was played by Laura Flannery. The film's story features Jordan returning to Silver Spring to deal with the ghost of her aunt Anne, who has combined forces with a convict in order to seek revenge.
