= Blackway =

- Theatrical release poster
- Directed by: Daniel Alfredson
- Written by: Joseph Gangemi; Gregory Jacobs
- Based on: Go with Me by Castle Freeman Jr.
- Produced by: Rick Dugdale; Ellen Goldsmith-Vein; Anthony Hopkins; Gregory Jacobs; Lindsay Williams
- Starring: Anthony Hopkins; Julia Stiles; Alexander Ludwig; Ray Liotta; Hal Holbrook
- Cinematography: Rasmus Videbæk
- Edited by: Håkan Karlsson
- Music by: Anders Niska; Klas Wahl
- Production companies: Enderby Entertainment; The Gotham Group
- Distributed by: TW Media Events (Canada); Electric Entertainment (International)
- Release dates: September 11, 2015 (Venice); June 10, 2016
- Running time: 90 minutes
- Countries: Canada; United States
- Language: English

Blackway is a 2015 thriller film directed by Daniel Alfredson and written by Joseph Gangemi and Gregory Jacobs, based on the 2008 novel Go with Me by Castle Freeman Jr. The film stars Anthony Hopkins, Julia Stiles, Ray Liotta, Alexander Ludwig and Hal Holbrook. Filmed in Canada in 2014, the film premiered under the festival title Go with Me at the 2015 Venice Film Festival on September 11, 2015, and was released theatrically on June 10, 2016.

This is the final film appearance of Hal Holbrook before his death in January 2021.

== Plot ==
In an Oregon logging community, a man, Blackway, has been harassing Lillian, a woman newly returned to her hometown.

Lillian finds her cat decapitated. She reports this to the town's sheriff but he advises her to leave town. She refuses, so he advises her to speak to a man named Scotty. She seeks Scotty at his workplace, a timber yard, but he is out of town. Like the sheriff, the yard's elderly owner and elder workers advise her to leave town. Jokingly, the owner offers a week's pay and funeral expenses to anyone who helps her. To his shock, an old man named Lester, agrees. Lester's protege, Nate, joins him.

Lilian, Lester, and Nate drive around, looking for Blackway at various locations. Through flashbacks and conversations, we learn about Blackway's past impact on each of the three and on other townspeople. Blackway is universally hated but also feared. He is no ordinary bully. He leads the area's criminals and was once the sheriff's deputy.

As the day progresses, things escalate. The three get into physical fights with Blackway's people. They cripple his associate, Murdoch, destroy a building, steal firearms. Blackway learns of this and sets off to find them.

With evening falling, the three visit an abandoned, remote logging site. The site has significance for Lester and Blackway. Blackway isn't there, but they expect him. Lester asks Lilian and Nate to build a campfire. He gives Lilian a handgun, then walks off into the darkness with his rifle, supposedly to scout the area. Instead, he hides in the nearby trees, and awaits Blackway's arrival, using Lilian and Nate as bait.

Blackway surprises Lilian and Nate. At gun point, he disarms Lilian. Nate and Blackway struggle, while Lilian regains her handgun. Simultaneously, Lester is well positioned but Murdoch has also come: he spots Lester and shoots, injuring him. Lilian runs off, and Blackway leaves Nate unconscious, to chase after Lilian.

Murdoch searches for Lester, to finish him, but Nate takes Murdoch by surprise. They struggle, and Murdoch dies. Meanwhile, Lilian shoots but misses Blackway. Having run out of bullets, they struggle and she is repeatedly stabbed, but Lester surprises them and shoots Blackway, killing him.

They carry the dead bodies of Blackway and Murdoch deeper into the woods, to be eaten by animals. In the morning, they return to town and to their lives, each with multiple injuries. But they have been changed, as has the town.

== Cast ==
- Anthony Hopkins as Lester
- Julia Stiles as Lillian
- Ray Liotta as Blackway
- Alexander Ludwig as Nate
- Hal Holbrook as Whizzer
- Lochlyn Munro as Murdoch
- Dale Wilson as Sheriff Wingate

== Production ==
In August 2014, during an interview, writer Joseph Gangemi revealed that Gregory Jacobs and he had created a film adaptation of novel Go with Me by Castle Freeman, Jr. On September 19 it was announced that Anthony Hopkins would star in the lead role and Daniel Alfredson would direct the film, which Enderby Entertainment and The Gotham Group would produce. Rick Dugdale would produce along with Lindsay Williams and Ellen Goldsmith-Vein, while Hopkins would also produce along with Jacobs. On October 23, Dean Devlin's Electric Entertainment came on board to co-finance and handle international rights to the film. On October 30, Julia Stiles and Ray Liotta joined the film. On November 17, Alexander Ludwig joined the film to play a young sidekick of an ex-logger.

=== Filming ===
Filming began on November 12, 2014 primarily in Enderby, British Columbia. It would also be shot in Lumby. Filming lasted until late December.

== Release ==
The film had its world premiere at the Venice Film Festival on September 11, 2015. The film was then released theatrically on June 10, 2016 by TW Media Events while Electric Entertainment distributed the film in the United States and the rest of the world.

=== Home media ===
Sony Pictures Home Entertainment released the film onto DVD in 2017.

== Reception ==
On review aggregator Rotten Tomatoes, the film holds an approval rating of 20% based on 5 reviews, with an average rating of 3.92/10. Guy Lodge of Variety called the film a "turgid, tension-free revenge thriller".
