= Castle Freeman Jr. =

American writer and journalist (born 1944)

- Born: November 26, 1944 (age 81); San Antonio, Texas, U.S.
- Education: Columbia University School of General Studies
- Occupation: Author
- Spouse: Alice Chaffee (m. 1969)
- Writing career
- Notable work: Go with Me (2008)
- Website: castlefreemanjr.com

Castle Freeman Jr. (born November 26, 1944) is an American author. He is the author of the novel Go with Me, adapted into the film Blackway (2015) starring Anthony Hopkins and Julia Stiles. For 30 years he was a contributor to The Old Farmer's Almanac, and he is the author of four other novels, two short-story collections, as well as a major history of a Vermont township.

== Life ==
Castle Freeman Jr. was born in San Antonio, Texas in 1944, the son of an officer in the Army Air Corps. His family was from Illinois, and he grew up in Chicago. He studied at Columbia University School of General Studies graduating in 1968, and in 1969 married artist and designer Alice Chaffee. In 1972, they moved to Vermont, living in Newfane since 1975.

== Writing ==
Freeman began writing on his arrival in Vermont. Although employed as an editor and proof-reader for book and magazine publishers, he has been a regular contributor to several periodicals including The Old Farmer's Almanac (1982–2011), Harrowsmith Country Life Magazine (1992–93), and Vermont Life Magazine (2009–2018). He has had four novels and two short-story collections published as well as a collection of essays and a history of Townshend, Vermont. He is also the author of fifty short-stories and over 100 essays and other non-fiction. Virtually all his writing concerns rural northern New England and Vermont in particular.

His work has also appeared in The Best American Short Stories and The Best American Nonrequired Reading.

== Bibliography ==
Castle Freeman's published work includes:

=== Novels ===
- Judgment Hill (1997)
- My Life and Adventures (2002)
- Go with Me (2008)
- All That I Have (2009)
- The Devil in the Valley (2015)
- Old Number Five (2018)
- Children of the Valley (2020)

=== Short story collections ===
- The Bride of Ambrose and Other Stories (1987)
- Round Mountain: Twelve Stories (2012)

=== Others ===
- Spring Snow: The Seasons of New England from The Old Farmer's Almanac (1995) - Essay collection
- A Stitch In Time: Townshend, Vermont, 1753-2003 (non-fiction)
