= The Ritual Killer =

2023 American film by George Gallo

- Theatrical release poster
- Directed by: George Gallo
- Screenplay by: Robert T. Bowersox; Jennifer Lemmon; Francesco Cinquemani; Giorgia Iannone; Luca Giliberto; Ferdinando Dell'Omo
- Story by: Joe Lemmon; Francesco Cinquemani; Giorgia Iannone
- Produced by: Joe Lemmon; Bret Saxon; Jeff Bowler; Andrea Iervolino; Monika Bacardi; Danielle Maloni
- Starring: Morgan Freeman; Cole Hauser
- Cinematography: Andrzej Sekuła
- Edited by: Yvan Gauthier
- Music by: Tom Russbueldt
- Production companies: Iervolino & Lady Bacardi Entertainment
- Distributed by: Redbox Entertainment
- Release date: March 10, 2023
- Running time: 92 minutes
- Country: United States
- Language: English

The Ritual Killer is a 2023 American action-thriller film directed by George Gallo. It stars Morgan Freeman and Cole Hauser. It was released by Screen Media and Redbox Entertainment on March 10, 2023.

== Premise ==
Inspector Mario Lavazzi in Rome discovers the mutilated body of a victim of a serial killer who apparently sacrifices people according to certain African rituals. The Italian police manage to track down a certain Mgwushu Randoku, but the dark-skinned athlete displays extraordinary agility and escapes from the police, nearly killing Lavazzi himself. Randoku meets with Shelbie Farmer, a businessman and politician from South Africa, who offers him some kind of job.

Detectives from the Mississippi State Police, Boyd and Kersh, arrest a rapist holding a teenage girl captive. While Kersh leads the girl out, Boyd shoots the criminal in the forehead, justifying his actions before the commission as necessary self-defense. Boyd is constantly tormented by nightmares. His daughter, suffering from epilepsy, once had a seizure, fell off a pier, and drowned; his wife was unable to forgive Boyd for falling asleep and failing to watch over their child, and eventually committed suicide.

Police fish out of a river the horribly mutilated corpse of a schoolgirl: while still alive, her eyes and some internal organs were cut out. Soon another schoolchild goes missing. Boyd turns to the only specialist in town, Professor Maklze—a local college professor of African studies and an immigrant from Lesotho. Reluctantly, Maklze agrees to cooperate, believing that the killer is a so-called "healer" who removes organs to create the so-called "muti"—a dish granting strength and supernatural abilities to wealthy and influential individuals. The professor reads an inscription left by Randoku at the sacrificial site in Zulu language: "I take power—I become power."

The two policemen notice Randoku's van, matching descriptions of the kidnapper's vehicle, and enter a bar where Randoku is talking to a bartender. The dark-skinned shaman effortlessly kills both officers. Enraged, the police intensify their efforts, identifying Randoku through fingerprints on a glass and connecting him to Farmer via Lavazzi. Boyd corners Farmer, but threats do not intimidate the businessman. In turn, Randoku threatens Maklze, yet the professor also stands firm against intimidation. Police trace Randoku again, but he evades pursuit once more—as he did in Rome—severely wounding detective Kersh in the process.

Farmer places a new order with Randoku, requesting organs from a young female student-athlete excelling academically. Farmer invites a suitable candidate, offering her a scholarship. The pair prepares to sacrifice the girl, and Maklze suggests the ritual will likely occur in a secluded place near water. Maklze and Boyd hurry toward one of Farmer's warehouses fitting this description. Boyd aims his weapon at Randoku, but Farmer approaches and knocks out the detective. Maklze kills Farmer and wounds Randoku.

Boyd visits Kersh in the hospital and learns with amazement that after an elderly black man prayed beside her ward, the woman previously on the brink of death unexpectedly began recovering rapidly. Boyd himself suddenly finds relief from his nightmares—in one dream, his wife asks forgiveness from him. Both Boyd and Lavazzi receive identical packages by mail. Inside the box, Boyd finds a note reading "I've got him" and "muti" prepared from Randoku's eyes. Boyd consumes the eyes.

== Cast ==
- Morgan Freeman as Dr. Mackles
- Cole Hauser as Detective Lucas Boyd
- Vernon Davis as Randoku
- Giuseppe Zeno as Inspector Mario Lavazzi
- Murielle Hilaire as Detective Kersch
- Luke Stratte-McClure as Detective Claussen
- Mayumi Roller as Deelie Boyd
- Brian Kurlander as Shelby Farner
- Julie Lott as Doctor Mannheim
- Destiny Loren as Katie Franklin
- Peter Stormare as Captain Marchand

== Production ==
In August 2021, it was reported that George Gallo would direct the action thriller film Muti. The screenplay was written by Bob Bowersox, Jennifer Lemmon, Francesco Cinquemani, Giorgia Iannone, Luca Giliberto, and Ferdinando Dell'Omo, based on a story by Joe Lemmon, Cinquemani and Iannone. Cole Hauser, Morgan Freeman, Peter Stormare, and Vernon Davis were announced as part of the cast. Filming began that same month in Jackson, Mississippi, with Murielle Hilaire and Julie Lott joining the cast.

Additional filming took place in Rome, Italy. The film's opening foot chase, along the Spanish Steps, was shot on the night of October 21, right after a scene (filmed in Viale Adamo Mickievicz) featuring actor Brian Kurlander, that ended up being cut from the final film.

== Release ==
In September 2021, Redbox Entertainment acquired distribution rights to the film in the United States and Canada. In February 2023, the film's trailer was released, revealing its new title, The Ritual Killer. It was released by Screen Media in theaters, on demand and as a DVD and Blu-Ray Redbox exclusive on March 10, 2023.

=== Critical reception ===
On the review aggregator website Rotten Tomatoes, 10% of 10 critics' reviews are positive, with an average rating of 2.90/10.
