= The Sweet Idleness =

- Release poster
- Directed by: FellinAI
- Written by: Andrea Buglione
- Produced by: Andrea Iervolino
- Production company: Andrea Iervolino Company
- Countries: Italy; Canada
- Language: English

The Sweet Idleness is an upcoming dystopian film. It is touted by director Andrea Iervolino as "the world's first AI-directed feature film".

== Premise ==
A futuristic world in which only 1% of humanity still works, while the rest of the population lives in freedom.

== Production ==
It October 2025, it was revealed that Andrea Iervolino had developed the world's first feature-length AI generated film directed by an AI agent, titled The Sweet Idleness. The cast was overseen by an artificial intelligence director named FellinAI. The film was conceived as a way to "celebrate the poetic and dreamlike language of great European cinema".

The first teaser trailer was released on October 1, 2025.

== Release ==
The Sweet Idleness was scheduled to be released in February 2026.
