= Alliance of Women Directors =

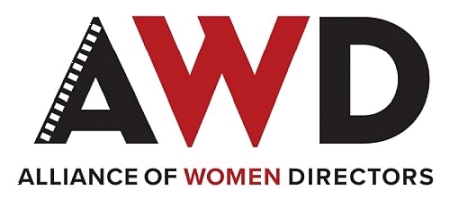
- Abbreviation: AWD
- Formation: 1997
- Type: 501(c)(3)
- Executive Director: Kylie Eaton
- Board Chair: Jennifer Warren
- Board of directors: Melissa Balint, Julianna Piechoczek, Candice Carella, Asha Chai-Chang, Amanda Donenfeld, Anise Fuller, Elise Hines, Jan Johnson Goldberger, Ashley Maria, Lesley Powers, Natalie Simpkins, Maria Valdez, Donna Bonilla Wheeler, Monique Younger
- Website: www.allianceofwomendirectors.org

Alliance of Women Directors (AWD) is an American 501c(3) nonprofit organization dedicated to advancing the careers of women and gender-expansive directors working in film, television, and emerging media. Founded in 1997 and headquartered in Los Angeles, the organization provides professional development, mentorship, networking opportunities, advocacy, and educational programming for directors throughout their careers.

As of 2026, the organization serves more than 850 members across the United States.

== Programs ==
Alliance of Women Directors produces year-round educational and professional development programs for directors, including workshops, panel discussions, networking events, mentorship initiatives, and career development opportunities.

Among its signature programs are the Rising Director Fellowship, which supports directors attached to their first feature film directors through mentorship and industry access; Black Directors Advancement Initiative (BDAI), a professional development and mentorship program for Black women and gender-expansive directors; #MentorLatinaDirectors, a mentorship program for Latine and Indigenous directors; and Back To Set, an annual directing conference open to the public featuring filmmakers, executives, and industry professionals.

AWD is a partner of STARZ #TakeTheLead, and together the organizations developed the Creative Leadership Lab, a mentorship and career development program for emerging episodic television directors.

The organization also hosts screenings, filmmaker conversations, networking events, and educational workshops for both members and the public, and partners with studios, guilds, film festivals, and industry organizations on professional development initiatives.

== Advocacy ==
AWD advocates for increased representation of women and gender-expansive directors in the entertainment industry and promotes greater equity in directing opportunities across film, television, commercials, and digital media. The organization regularly participates in industry conversations about hiring practices, career advancement, and leadership opportunities for directors.

== Organization ==
Alliance of Women Directors is governed by a Board of Directors and is led by an Executive Director. Membership is open to professional directors whose work has been publicly exhibited across narrative, documentary, television, commercial, and digital formats.

The organization has included among its members directors such as Mimi Leder, Lesli Linka Glatter, Debra Granik, Bethany Rooney, Betty Thomas, Patricia Riggen, Jen McGowan, and many other established and emerging filmmakers.

== Awards ==
On April 28, 2016, the AWD held its first Alliance of Women Directors Awards ceremony at the Paley Center for Media (Beverly Hills). Television producers Greg Berlanti (Arrow, Supergirl, The Flash) and Ilene Chaiken (Empire) were honored for expanding opportunities for women in directing and other behind the camera roles in the television industry. Producers Chiara Tilesi and Albert Berger of the We Do It Together foundation were also honored, and director Jen McGowan (Kelly & Cal) was awarded the AWD Breakout Award.

== See also ==
- List of female film and television directors
