= Stolen Girl (2025 film) =

- Theatrical release poster
- Directed by: James Kent
- Written by: Kas Graham; Rebecca Pollock
- Produced by: Monika Bacardi; Andrea Iervolino; Scott Lambert; Frida Torresblanco
- Starring: Kate Beckinsale; Scott Eastwood; Jordan Duvigneau; Matt Craven; Alejandra Howard; Arvin Kananian
- Cinematography: Teo Delgado
- Edited by: Tommy Aagaard
- Music by: Sam Ewing
- Production companies: Hangtime International Pictures; Sipario Movies
- Distributed by: Vertical
- Release date: September 25, 2025
- Running time: 105 minutes
- Country: United States
- Language: English

Stolen Girl is a 2025 American action thriller film directed by James Kent and starring Kate Beckinsale, Scott Eastwood, Jordan Duvigneau, Matt Craven, Alejandra Howard and Arvin Kananian.

== Plot ==
The film follows Maureen Dabbagh (played by Kate Beckinsale), whose life is shattered when her ex-husband abducts their young daughter and takes her to the Middle East. Years of grief and failed attempts to find her child leave Maureen desperate. When she encounters Robeson (Scott Eastwood), a mysterious ex-Marine with expertise in recovering abducted children, the two form an uneasy partnership to bring the girl home. Their search draws them into a dangerous world of covert operations, international intrigue, and corruption, where they must confront betrayal and hidden agendas in order to rescue Maureen’s daughter before it’s too late.

== Cast ==
Cast includes:

- Kate Beckinsale as Maureen Dabbagh
- Scott Eastwood as Robeson
- Jordan Duvigneau as Carl
- Matt Craven as Joe
- Alejandra Howard as Amina
- Ana Golja as Nora
- Arvin Kananian as Karim
- Talia Asseraf as Natalie
- Massimo McQueen as Cowboy
- Robert Farrior as Lewis
- Nowar Yusuf as Dasia
- Paten Hughes as Ohio Detective
- Maddalena Vallecchi Williams as World-weary woman
- Nikki Taylor as extra American Tourist
- Jon Kellam as Frank
