= Monika Bacardi =

Italian film producer

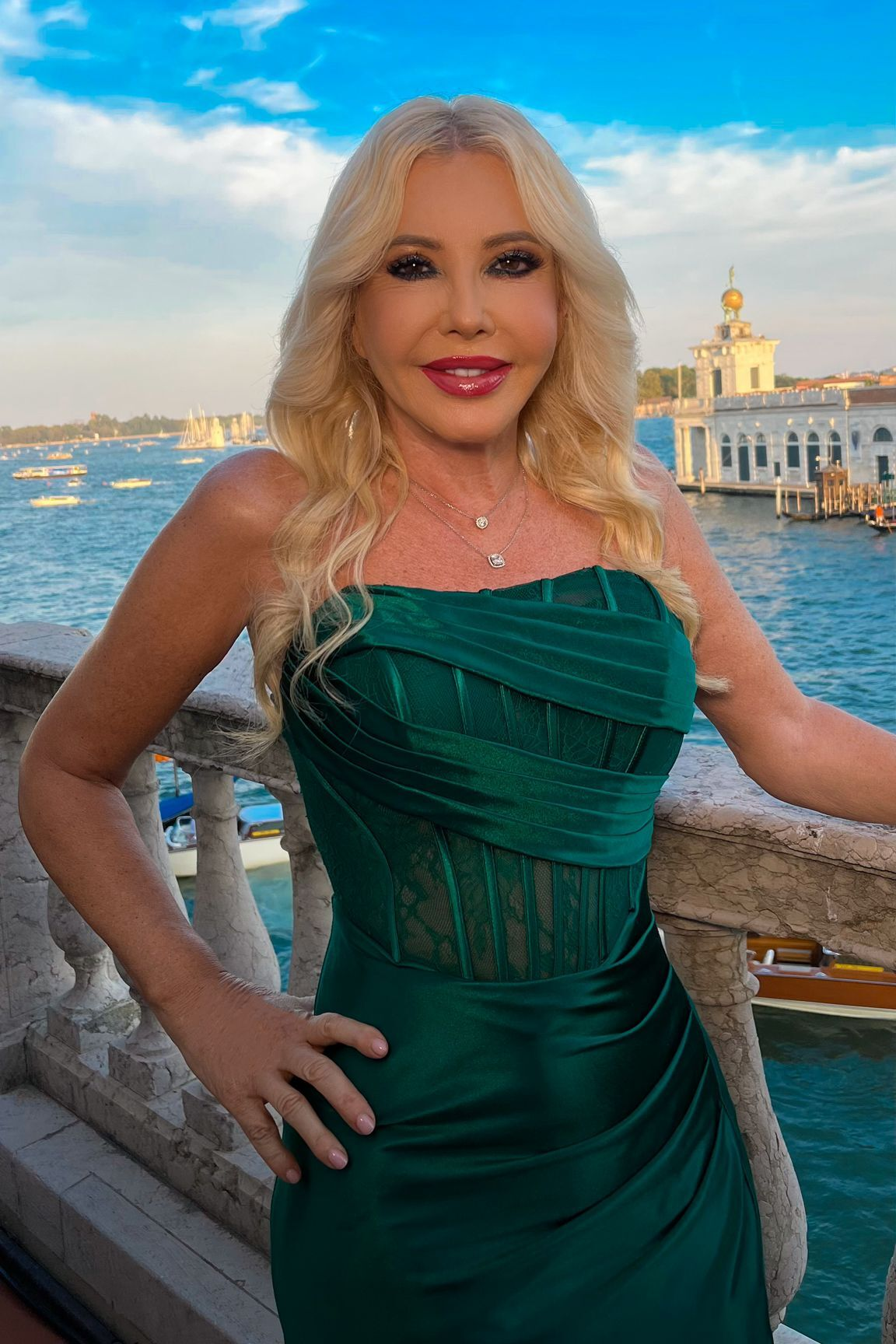
- Bacardi in 2024
- Born: Monika Waldner; Merano, South Tyrol, Italy
- Occupation: Producer
- Spouse: Luis Gómez del Campo Bacardí (m. 2000; died 2005)
- Children: 1
- Website: ladymonikabacardi.com

Monika Gómez del Campo Bacardí (née Waldner) is an Italian film and television producer and socialite.

== Early life and career ==
Monika Waldner was born in Merano, South Tyrol, Italy, to a wealthy family who worked in real estate. At the age of 20, she moved to Monaco. In 1997, she began working as an assistant to Luis Gómez del Campo Bacardí, her future husband. She co-founded AMBI Pictures with Andrea Iervolino in 2013, but Iervolino left their partnership in 2024.

== Personal life ==
She married Luis Gómez del Campo Bacardí, great-grandson of Facundo Bacardi, in 2000; he later died in 2005. Their daughter, Maria Luisa, was born in 2001. In 2022, Bacardi became a naturalized citizen of Monaco.

== Filmography ==
=== Film ===
Year	Title	Notes	Ref.
2014	2047: Sights of Death	Producer	
2014	The Humbling	Co-producer	
2014	Three Touches	Executive producer, co-producer	
2015	Hope Lost	Associate producer	
2015	Septembers of Shiraz	Co-producer	
2015	Andron	Producer	
2015	Bilal: A New Breed of Hero	Executive producer	
2015	All Roads Lead to Rome	Producer	
2016	Lavender	Executive producer	
2016	Rupture	Producer	
2016	Chuck	Co-producer	
2016	In Dubious Battle	Producer	
2016	This Beautiful Fantastic	Producer	
2016	East End	Producer	
2017	To the Bone	Producer	
2017	In Search of Fellini	Executive producer	
2017	Black Butterfly	Producer	
2017	The Music of Silence	Producer	
2017	Beyond the Sun	Producer	
2018	Beyond the Edge	Producer, executive producer	
2018	Bent	Producer	
2018	Murderous Trance	Executive producer	
2018	Here and Now	Producer	
2018	Future World	Producer	
2018	Welcome Home	Executive producer	
2018	Bernie the Dolphin	Producer	
2019	Trading Paint	Producer	
2019	Finding Steve McQueen	Producer	
2019	After Class	Executive producer	
2019	Waiting for the Barbarians	Producer	
2019	Semper Fi	Executive producer	
2019	Arctic Dogs	Producer	
2019	Bernie the Dolphin 2	Producer	
2022	Eddie & Sunny	Producer	
2022	Dakota	Producer	
2022	Tell It Like a Woman	Producer	
2022	Lamborghini: The Man Behind the Legend	Producer	
2023	The Ritual Killer	Producer	
2023	In the Fire	Producer	
2023	Billie's Magic World	Producer	
2023	Ferrari	Producer	
2024	Johnny Puff: Secret Mission	Executive producer	
2024	Paradox Effect	Producer	
2024	Skincare	Executive producer	
2024	Modì, Three Days on the Wing of Madness	Producer	
2024	Kill 'Em All 2	Producer	
2024	Kid Santa	Producer	
2025	Find Your Friends	Producer	
2025	Stolen Girl	Producer	

=== Television ===
Year	Title	Notes	Ref.
2020–2021	Puffins	Producer	
2020–2022	Arctic Friends	Producer	
2021–2022	Puffins Impossible	Producer	
2024	Cruel Intentions	Producer	
