= Cinquemani =

Cinquemani is an Italian surname. Notable people with the surname include:

- Francesco Cinquemani (1978–2024), Italian screenwriter, director and journalist
- Michael J. Cinquemani, American television writer
