= Puffins (TV series) =

Animated teleivision series

- Promotional poster
- Genre: Animated
- Created by: Danielle Maloni; Peter Nalli
- Voices of: Johnny Depp
- Original language: English
- No. of seasons: 1
- No. of episodes: 250

Production
- Production company: Iervolino Entertainment

Original release
- Network: Apple TV+
- Release: December 1, 2020

Related
- Arctic Dogs; Arctic Friends; Puffins Impossible

Puffins is an animated television series targeted at children created by Danielle Maloni and Peter Nalli. It is a spin-off of the film Arctic Dogs (2019) and stars Johnny Depp. It follows five Puffins: Johnny Puff (Depp), Tic, Tac, Didi, and Pi who work for the wily walrus Otto. The show is produced by Iervolino Entertainment owned by Andrea Iervolino and Monika Bacardi, and ILBE Studios based in Serbia. It consists of 250 episodes of five-minute episodes and was released on Apple TV and Amazon Prime Video in December 2020. A spin-off of Puffins, entitled Puffins Impossible, was released in April 2022, with Depp reprising his role as Puff.

== Overview ==
Puffins is a CGI animated television series targeted towards children. It follows five Puffins: Johnny Puff, Tic, Tac, Didi, and Pi. They work for a wily walrus Otto. The show promotes themes of race and gender equality and environmentalism.

== Cast ==
Voice roles:

- Johnny Depp as Johnny Puff.

== Episodes ==
Puffins consists of 250 five-minute episodes.

== Production ==
Puffins was created by Danielle Maloni and Peter Nalli. Johnny Depp was cast to voice Johnny Puff in early 2020. Puffins was produced by Iervolino Entertainment based in Rome, Italy, and Serbian company Iervolino Studios. Iervolino Entertainment was founded by producer Andrea Iervolino and is owned by Iervolino and Monika Bacardi. Depp and Iervolino previously collaborated on Waiting for the Barbarians.

Puffins and similar series Arctic Friends originated from the film Arctic Dogs (2019). Iervolino and Bacardi purchased all spin-off rights of the animated characters from the film. The show was released in December 2020 on Apple TV and Amazon Prime Video.

In February 2022, Depp received the Serbian Gold Medal of Merit from President Aleksandar Vučić for "outstanding merits in public and cultural activities, especially in the field of film art and the promotion of the Republic of Serbia in the world". Puffins and Puffins Impossible were produced or co-produced in Serbia. Also, Minamata, another film Depp starred in was shot in Serbia.

== Puffins Impossible ==
Puffins Impossible is a spin-off of Puffins which consists of 54 five-minute episodes. It was made by ILBE Studios and produced by Archangel Digital Studios. Nalli is the showrunner for Impossible. It is an action-adventure version of Puffins which follows the five Puffins gaining superpowers. Depp reprises his role as Johnny Puff. It was released in April 2022.

According to local media reports, the series provided jobs in the creative centre in Belgrade, Serbia. The series received 206 million Serbian dinars (€1.7 million) in subsidies from Ministry of Culture and Information.
