= This Beautiful Fantastic =

- Film poster
- Directed by: Simon Aboud
- Written by: Simon Aboud
- Produced by: Andrea Iervolino; Monika Bacardi; Christine Alderson; Kami Naghdi; Matt Treadwell; Iliane Ogilvie Thompson; Jennifer Levine; Norman Merry; Phil Hunt; Compton Ross
- Starring: Jessica Brown Findlay; Tom Wilkinson; Andrew Scott; Jeremy Irvine; Anna Chancellor; Eileen Davies
- Cinematography: Mike Eley
- Edited by: David Charap
- Music by: Anne Nikitin
- Production companies: Ipso Facto Productions; Smudge Films
- Release date: 29 October 2016 (New British Film Festival)
- Running time: 92 minutes
- Country: United Kingdom
- Languages: English; Irish

This Beautiful Fantastic is a 2016 British romantic drama film written and directed by Simon Aboud and starring Jessica Brown Findlay, Tom Wilkinson, Andrew Scott, Jeremy Irvine, Anna Chancellor, and Eileen Davies.

Aboud explained that the idea of Bella's OCD came from his own personal experience, explaining that "the symbolism in the film of Bella's experience with nature" where in her life everything has to be under control, is confronted by Alfie's garden "...the opposite of what she's dealing with — his garden is wild, he doesn't try to control it... for me, I wanted to explore the possibility of her embracing the “mess” of the garden."

The library scenes were filmed at the Grade II listed Stoke Newington Library, north London.

== Plot ==
Bella Brown is a young woman, a foundling, with obsessive–compulsive disorder. She works in a public library and is trying to write a children's book. Bella's fear of plants causes her to neglect the garden of her rented basement flat. Bella meets her next-door-neighbor, a curmudgeonly widower named Alfie Stevenson, and his cook Vernon. After Alfie reports Bella, her landlord gives her one month in which to improve the garden, or face eviction. As Bella works on the garden, she bonds with Alfie, whom Vernon has convinced to help. Alfie helps her find an appreciation for nature. She also starts a romance with Billy, a young inventor who frequents the library, and who inspires her to begin writing a new story.

A storm destroys most of Bella's progress on the garden. Billy asks her out on a date, but that day she is fired from her job and then sees Billy with another woman. She falls into a depression. With only a short time left until her landlord's deadline, Alfie and Vernon finish the garden for her. Billy visits and explains that he missed their date because he was in the hospital after an accident, and the person she saw was one of his triplet brothers. Soon afterward, Alfie passes away. He was actually the owner of Bella's house, and has left it to her, and his own house to Vernon. Bella, now in a relationship with Billy, publishes her picture book, titled This Beautiful Fantastic.

== Cast ==
- Jessica Brown Findlay as Bella Brown
- Tom Wilkinson as Alfie Stevenson, Brown's neighbour
- Andrew Scott as Vernon, chef
- Jeremy Irvine as Billy Tranter, inventor
- Anna Chancellor as Mrs. Bramble, librarian
- Eileen Davies as Milly

== Production ==
Principal photography on the film began in London in July 2015.

== Reception ==
On review aggregator website Rotten Tomatoes, the film holds an approval rating of 61% based on 23 reviews, and an average rating of 6.08/10. On Metacritic, the film has a weighted average score of 51 out of 100, based on 10 critics, indicating "mixed or average reviews".

Middling reviews from critics used the term "twee" with comparisons to Amélie. Negative reviews focused on there being too many distracting questions, such as why Bella doesn't just hire a gardener for a few days, and the film's depiction of troubled mental health as a charming eccentricity. Some reviews focused on taste, with Dennis Harvey calling the film a "formulaic crowd-pleaser", that audiences will either find the film sweet or too sweet. Sheri Linden calls the film "sweet but not saccharine" and Neil Genzlinger writes "enjoyable performances keep the tale from becoming too heavy-handed".

BBC Television broadcast the film 12 times between 2018 and 2025, and it has been published on DVD in France.
