= Gana Bayarsaikhan =

Mongolian actress

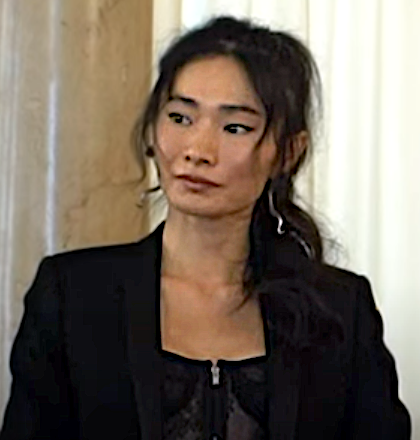
- Gana Bayarsaikhan in 2019
- Born: Ulaanbaatar, Mongolia
- Occupation: Actress
- Years active: 2014–present

Gana Bayarsaikhan (Mongolian: Баярсайханы Ганчимэг) is a Mongolian actress and model known for her role as "the girl" in the 2019 film Waiting for the Barbarians and as Tuva Olsen in the 2020 Sky TV series Intelligence.

== Early life and career ==
Bayarsaikhan was born and raised in Ulaanbaatar, Mongolia. She started her career as a model, and has appeared in Schön magazine. After finishing drama training, she took a coaching programme to help her accept her own speech and accent for auditions.

Bayarsaikhan made her screen acting debut as the android Jade in the 2015 film Ex Machina alongside Domhnall Gleeson. and secured small roles as Khutu in Ben-Hur (2016) and in Wonder Woman (2017).

Bayarsaikhan became the first Mongolian actress ever to play a lead role in a Hollywood movie when she was cast as "the girl" in the 2019 film Waiting for the Barbarians, which co-starred Johnny Depp and Mark Rylance, and premiered at the 76th Venice International Film Festival on 6 September 2019, to which Bayarsaikhan attended. Director Ciro Guerra described how Bayarsaikhan and the other 14 Mongolian actors shared their culture, enriching the film in the process.

Bayarsaikhan plays Tuva Olsen, a main character in the 2020 Sky TV series Intelligence, alongside David Schwimmer and Nick Mohammed. Series 2 of Intelligence was released in 2021.

== Filmography ==
=== Film ===
Year	Title	Role
2014	Ex Machina	Jade
2016	Ben-Hur	Khutu
2017	Wonder Woman	Throne Room Amazon
2018	Sweet Lies (short film)	Honey
2019	Mad Lord (short film)	Sokushitsu
2019	Waiting for the Barbarians	The Girl
2020	Three Dots and a Dash (short film)	Nikita Hayashi

=== Television ===
Year	Title	Role	Notes
2019	Peaky Blinders	Li	1 episode ("The Loop")
2020-2021	Intelligence	Tuva Olsen	Main role - 12 episodes
2021	Queens of Mystery	Yetao	2 episodes - Modern Art of Murder 1 & 2
2022	Documentary Now	Masho	2 episodes - Soldier of Illusion, Parts 1 & 2
