= Rupture (2016 film) =

- Theatrical release poster
- Directed by: Steven Shainberg
- Screenplay by: Brian Nelson
- Story by: Brian Nelson; Steven Shainberg
- Produced by: Monika Bacardi; Andrea Iervolino; Andrew Lazar; Bruno Rosato; Steven Shainberg; Christina Weiss Lurie
- Starring: Noomi Rapace
- Cinematography: Karim Hussain
- Music by: Nathan Larson
- Production companies: Ambi Pictures; Tango Pictures
- Release dates: July 15, 2016 (Fantasia International Film Festival); September 4, 2016 (UK)
- Running time: 102 minutes
- Country: United States
- Language: English
- Box office: $31,238

Rupture is a 2016 American science fiction horror thriller film directed by Steven Shainberg and starring Noomi Rapace.

== Plot ==
After dropping off her son Evan with her ex-husband Cliff, Renée Morgan is abducted during a staged roadside tire repair by a five-person team overseen by Dr. Nyman. Stunned with a stun gun, Renée is carried into the team's truck, chained down and transported to a warehouse laboratory where she is strapped to a table and held prisoner in a private room.

A fellow captive named Seth tells Renée to remember "G10 12X." Fellow captive Blake talks to Renée through the vent from an adjacent room and explains that their captors are forcing subjects to face their personal fears. Renée additionally learns that this mysterious group has secretly monitored subjects all over the world for decades.

With the entire operation overseen by Terrence, Renée is repeatedly tested and experimented on by Dr. Nyman, Dr. Raxlen, Diana, Colette, and a Bald Man. Suffering from arachnophobia, Renée panics when Diana and the Bald Man test Renée by having a spider crawl on her.

Renée eventually breaks free of her restraints and crawls into the ventilation system. Renée peeks into other holding cells and sees other captives being tested according to their fears.

Renée makes her way to Blake’s room and hides under his table when the doctors enter. Exploiting Blake’s fear of snakes, the doctors cryptically reveal that they are using terror to initiate a DNA change in test subjects. Having failed his final test, Colette gives Blake a medication via a syringe, telling him it will sedate him and when he awakes, he will be back home. When Blake is wheeled out of his room, Renée uses the opportunity to sneak into the hallway through his open cell door and explore the lab.

Realizing Renée may be their only hope, the team agrees to put Renée through one more test. Renée quickly crawls back through the ventilation system and returns to her room before it is discovered she is missing. Diana, lying to Renée, seductively touches Renée under her clothing and tells her about Evan, explaining that Diana can learn details about Renée's son through her skin. Diana additionally explains that G10 12X is a genetic code that all humans have in their chromosomes. By rupturing that part of their genes through terror, humans can change shape and evolve as a life form.

Diana morphs her head into a deformed shape to prove the truth to Renée, unaware that Renée has secretly taken the syringe originally intended for her. Renée stabs Diana with the syringe and escapes back into the main facility. She finds a lab filled with DNA samples collected from numerous test subjects. She also overhears Dr. Raxlen and the Bald Man discussing the development of her ovum to accept non-human sperm.

The Bald Man senses that Renée has escaped and instead of chasing her through the factory, he goes to a computer and uses it to locate Renée’s location. He traps Renée in a room and uses gas to knock her unconscious.

When Renée awakes, Terrence, Dr. Nyman, Diana, and the Bald Man demonstrate that Renée now has improved eyesight and hearing. Terrence explains that they were all humans once, but overcoming fear transformed them. They now believe they can cure humanity of its self-destructive tendencies by building their numbers and altering the gene pool.

Renée is forcibly strapped into a transparent helmet in which spiders are released to crawl all over her face. Renée frantically tears at the mask and hits her head against the wall while the doctors observe. Suddenly, Renée is no longer afraid. She "ruptures" and the shape of her head grotesquely distorts, causing the mask to crack away from her head.

Renée returns to her everyday life as a covert plant for the group. Renée tries convincing her son that she knows people who can help him overcome his focus issues, but Evan refuses. Terrence, the Bald Man, and another henchman arrive at the house to take Evan by force. Renée has a change of heart and warns Evan to escape, which he does. Terrence calls off the chase and tells Renée that she will help him find Evan. Terrence also tells her that they have been waiting for Renée for a long time and now they finally have her.

== Cast ==
- Noomi Rapace as Renée Marie Morgan
- Peter Stormare as Terrence
- Kerry Bishé as Diana
- Michael Chiklis as Bald Man
- Lesley Manville as Dr. Nyman
- Ari Millen as Dr. Raxlen
- Joel Labelle as Captive Man
- Paul Popowich as Cliff
- Percy Hynes White as Evan
- Sergio Di Zio as Van Driver
- Jean Yoon as Colette
- Morgan Kelly as Tommy
- Brendan Jeffers as Seth
- Jonathan Potts as Blake

== Premiere and release ==
The film premiered at the Fantasia International Film Festival on July 15, 2016. It was released in the UK on November 4, 2016.

== Reception ==
The film holds a 18% positive rating at the film review aggregator website Rotten Tomatoes, based on 34 reviews, with an average rating of 4.4/10. The site's critical consensus reads, "Derivative and clumsily assembled, Rupture manages the tricky feat of making arachnophobia seem dull."
