= Andron (film) =

- Directed by: Francesco Cinquemani
- Written by: Francesco Cinquemani
- Produced by: Monika Bacardi; Andrea Iervolino
- Starring: Leo Howard; Gale Harold; Alec Baldwin; Danny Glover
- Cinematography: Gherardo Gossi
- Edited by: Francesco Puggioni
- Music by: Riccardo Eberspacher
- Distributed by: Momentum Pictures
- Release date: 8 November 2015 (Trieste Science+Fiction Festival)
- Running time: 100 minutes
- Countries: Italy; United Kingdom; Malta; Canada
- Language: English

Andron (also known as Andron: The Black Labyrinth) is a 2015 science fiction action film written and directed by Francesco Cinquemani and starring Leo Howard and Gale Harold, with Alec Baldwin and Danny Glover in supporting roles.

== Plot ==
Ten survivors are brainwashed and put into a maze where only one can survive. They are living in a world where people put their fates in the contestants' hands, ruled by the rich. Based on an Italian TV series.

== Cast ==
- Leo Howard as Alexander
- Gale Harold (credited as "Gale Morgan Harold III") as Julian
- Michelle Ryan as Elanor
- Antonia Campbell-Hughes as Valerie
- Skin as Anita
- Danny Glover as Chancellor Gordon
- Alec Baldwin as Adam

== Reception ==
The film has a 0% rating on Rotten Tomatoes based on six reviews. On Metacritic, the film has a weighted average score of 16 out of 100 based on four critics, indicating "generally unfavorable" reviews.
