= Night Hunter (2018 film) =

2019 Canadian-American action thriller film

- Theatrical release poster
- Directed by: David Raymond
- Written by: David Raymond
- Produced by: David Raymond; Robert Ogden Barnum; Chris Pettit; Jeff Beesley; Rick Dugdale
- Starring: Henry Cavill; Ben Kingsley; Alexandra Daddario; Stanley Tucci; Brendan Fletcher; Minka Kelly; Dylan Penn; Nathan Fillion
- Cinematography: Michael Barrett
- Edited by: Jim Page
- Music by: Alex Lu
- Production companies: Arise Pictures; Arcola Entertainment; Fortitude International; PalmStar Media; Buffalo Gal Pictures
- Distributed by: Saban Films
- Release dates: September 28, 2018 (LA Film Festival); September 6, 2019 (United States); March 14, 2020 (Mexico)
- Running time: 98 minutes
- Country: Canada
- Language: English
- Box office: $1 million

Night Hunter is a 2018 Canadian action thriller film written and directed by David Raymond. The film stars Henry Cavill, Ben Kingsley, Alexandra Daddario, and Stanley Tucci, with Brendan Fletcher, Minka Kelly, and Nathan Fillion in supporting roles.

Night Hunter premiered at the LA Film Festival on September 28, 2018, originally titled as Nomis. It was later released on August 8, 2019, by DirecTV on video on demand and theatrically on September 6 by Saban Films.

== Plot ==
When the body of a young woman is found on a lumber truck in Minnesota, Detective Walter Marshall suspects that the victim leapt to her death to escape from a captor. A breakthrough is inadvertently made in the case when former judge Michael Cooper's vigilante sting to capture a child predator results in his ward Lara being kidnapped. Through a tracker in Lara's earrings, Marshall finds her and other captive young women in a mansion owned by Simon Stulls, a man who appears to suffer from mental disability. Simon is arrested, and the police attempt to determine if he is responsible for the abductions. In investigating Simon's background, they discover that he was born from rape and his mother attempted suicide before giving birth to him.

While Simon is in custody, the police force finds themselves being targeted by another attacker. Technician Matthew Quinn is killed in a car bombing, and fellow technician Glasow is forced to free Simon when the life of his infant daughter is threatened. The police recapture Simon after he has killed his father, just as Cooper discovers that Lara is missing. Believing Simon to be responsible, Cooper ambushes his police transport when he is surprised by another man who looks exactly like Simon. It is then revealed that Simon is a pair of identical twins, one who is responsible for the kidnappings and one who is truly mentally disabled. The twins kill Cooper and kidnap police profiler Rachel Chase before escaping.

Using a tracker that Simon left in the police station, a team led by Marshall locates the twins by an icy lake where they are holding Rachel and Lara. Lara escapes, and Marshall takes the mentally disabled twin hostage to convince the murderous twin to release Rachel. After Rachel is freed, Marshall tells the disabled twin to hug his brother, who complies, causing both brothers to fall through the ice and drown.

Afterwards, Lara reads a letter from Cooper thanking her for all that she has done. Marshall visits his daughter Faye accompanied by Rachel, implying that Marshall and Rachel have entered into a relationship.

== Cast ==
- Henry Cavill as Walter Marshall, a police detective
- Ben Kingsley as Michael Cooper, a former judge turned vigilante
- Alexandra Daddario as Rachel Chase, a police profiler
- Stanley Tucci as Commissioner Harper, Marshall's superior
- Brendan Fletcher as Simon Stulls, a suspected kidnapper
- Minka Kelly as Angie, Marshall's ex-wife and Faye's mother
- Nathan Fillion as Matthew Quinn, a police technician
- Mpho Koaho as Glasow, a police technician
- Emma Tremblay as Faye, Marshall's daughter
- Eliana Jones as Lara, Cooper's adoptive daughter
- Daniela Lavender as Dickerman, a detective partnered with Marshall
- Beverly Noukwu as Biggs
- Dylan Penn as Sophia, a kidnapping victim
- Carlyn Burchell as Amy Stulls, Simon's mother

== Production ==
Fortitude International introduced the film to buyers at the Berlin International Film Festival. David Raymond wrote and directed the film and was also a producer alongside Fortitude’s Robert Ogden Barnum, Arise Pictures’ Chris Pettit, and Buffalo Gals’ Jeff Beesley. Rick Dugdale was also a producer and Fortitudes’ Nadine De Barros was executive producer.

=== Casting ===
Henry Cavill, Ben Kingsley, and Alexandra Daddario were announced to star on February 10, 2017. Minka Kelly, Stanley Tucci, Nathan Fillion, and Brendan Fletcher were announced on March 7, 2017 after filming had commenced.

=== Filming ===
Principal photography began on February 25, 2017 in Winnipeg, Manitoba and was completed on April 3, 2017.

== Reception ==
On Rotten Tomatoes the film has an approval rating of 14% based on 35 reviews, with an average rating of 4/10. The site's critical consensus reads, "Contrived and cliched, Night Hunter wastes a solid cast in pursuit of action-adventure thrills that stubbornly refuse to materialize." On Metacritic it has a weighted average score of 31 out of 100 based on reviews from 10 critics, indicating "generally unfavorable reviews".

Roger Moore of Movie Nation described the film as "cracked and incoherent" and criticized it for "[having] a lot of clutter, convoluted craziness and head-slappingly illogical turns in here, too", concluding that "whatever coherence the players saw on the screenplay page was lost in the trip from page to the shoot on set, and from the set to the editing bay". He gave the film 1.5/4 stars. Justin Lowe, writing for The Hollywood Reporter, described the film's plot as "overly complicated", further stating that "Narrative and stylistic references to Se7en, Split, The Silence of the Lambs and other serial-killer thrillers only manage to demonstrate how inadequately Nomis rates by comparison."
