= Tell It Like a Woman =

2022 American-Italian anthology film

- Directed by: Lucia Bulgheroni; Silvia Carobbio; Catherine Hardwicke; Taraji P. Henson; Mipo Oh; Lucía Puenzo; Maria Sole Tognazzi; Leena Yadav
- Written by: Lucia Bulgheroni; Silvia Carobbio; Krupa Ge; Catherine Hardwicke; Mipo Oh; Lucía Puenzo; Shantanu Sagara; Giulia Steigerwalt; Chiara Tilesi; Leena Yadav
- Produced by: Lucas Akoskin; Monika Bacardi; Andrea Iervolino; Chiara Tilesi
- Starring: Cara Delevingne; Marcia Gay Harden; Eva Longoria; Jennifer Hudson; Margherita Buy; Anne Watanabe; Jacqueline Fernandez
- Cinematography: Aseem Bajaj
- Edited by: Anne-Sophie Bion
- Music by: Elena Maro; Daniel Tarrab
- Production companies: Iervolino & Lady Bacardi Entertainment; We Do It Together
- Distributed by: Samuel Goldwyn Films
- Release date: October 7, 2022
- Running time: 110 minutes
- Countries: Italy; United States
- Language: English

Tell It Like a Woman is a 2022 anthology film of seven short stories directed by women. It was filmed in different parts of the world.

The film received a nomination at the 95th Academy Awards for Best Original Song for "Applause" by Diane Warren.

== Premise ==
Tell It Like a Woman is a feature film composed of seven short stories whose common denominator is the representation of female protagonists. Each of these very different women faces a particular challenge in their life with extreme determination and courage that makes them stronger and more self-aware. Some of these inspirational and empowering stories, which take place all over the world, are inspired by true events, while others are narrative fiction.

== Cast ==
- Cara Delevingne as Validation
- Marcia Gay Harden as Dr. Susan Partovi
- Eva Longoria as Ana
- Jennifer Hudson as Kim Carter / Pepcy
- Margherita Buy as Diana
- Anne Watanabe as Yuki
- Danielle Pinnock as Debra
- Leonor Varela as Tala
- Nate' Jones as Evelyn
- Pauletta Washington as Laurie Traynor
- Jacqueline Fernandez as Divya
- Jesse Garcia as Johnny
- Alex Bentley as Javi
- Jennifer Ulrich as Greta
- Katia Gomez as Maricela Lopez
- Katie McGovern as Teresa
- Brandon Win as Jack
- Ayesha Harris as Phyllis
- Gabriel Ellis as Ray
- Jasmine Luv as Tamika
- Holly Gilliam as Gallery Manager (voice)
- Iacopo Ricciotti as Edoardo
- Sergio Allard as Assistant
- Freddy Drabble as Tony
- Flaminia Sartini as Nora
- Anjali Lama as Anjali
- Andrea Vergoni as Marco

== Production ==
The film was shot in India, Italy, Japan, and the United States.

== Release ==
The film premiered at the Taormina Film Fest (TFF), where it won the TFF Excellence Award.

It arrived on VOD platforms, including Google Play, Prime Video and Vudu, on February 17, 2023.

== Reception ==
=== Critical ===
Writing for The Austin Chronicle, Jasmine Lane gave a positive review and wrote: "Though I would've liked to see these shorts plunge more deeply into the abstract concept of what it means to tell a story not just as a woman or about a woman but in a way only a woman can, in a world that seems increasingly determined to reduce the breadth of feminine identity to a singular biological imperative, these shorts feel triumphant". Conversely, Leslie Felperin of The Guardian wrote a negative review, with 2 out of 5 stars, writing: "[Cara] Delevingne is pretty good and Mipo O's story of a single mother struggling to stay afloat has impact – but most are on a spectrum between insipid and awful."

=== Accolades ===
Awards	Date of ceremony	Category	Recipient	Result	Ref.
Academy Awards	March 12, 2023	Best Original Song	"Applause"; Music and lyrics by Diane Warren	Nominated	
Capri, Hollywood	January 5, 2023	Best Original Song	"Applause"; Music and lyrics by Diane Warren	Won	
Hollywood Music in Media Awards	November 16, 2022	Best Original Song in an Independent Film	"Applause"; Music and lyrics by Diane Warren	Won	
Satellite Awards	March 3, 2023	Best Original Song	"Applause"; Music and lyrics by Diane Warren	Nominated	
Society of Composers & Lyricists	February 15, 2023	Outstanding Song for a Drama/Documentary	"Applause"; Music and lyrics by Diane Warren	Won	
Taormina Film Fest	July 23, 2022	TFF Excellence Award	Tell It Like a Woman	Won	
