= Beyond the Edge (2018 film) =

- Promotional poster
- Directed by: Aleksandr Boguslavskiy; Francesco Cinquemani
- Screenplay by: Aleksandr Boguslavskiy; Francesco Cinquemani; Aleksey Slushchev; Dmitriy Zhigalov
- Produced by: Monika Bacardi; Viktor Denisyuk; Evgeniy Melentev; Andrea Iervolino; Danielle Maloni
- Starring: Miloš Biković; Antonio Banderas; Lyubov Aksyonova; Yevgeny Stychkin; Yuriy Chursin
- Cinematography: Vyacheslav Lisnevskiy
- Edited by: Andrey Anaykin
- Music by: Alex HarDrum; Maksim Koshevarov; Aleksandr Maev
- Production companies: Kinodanz; Ares Film
- Distributed by: Karoprokat
- Release date: March 1, 2018
- Running time: 101 minutes
- Country: Russia
- Languages: English, Russian
- Box office: $2.3 million

Beyond the Edge (Russian: За гранью реальности, romanized: Za granyu realnosti) is a 2018 Russian science fiction heist film directed by Aleksandr Boguslavskiy and Francesco Cinquemani. Michael, a talented gambler, gathers a team of people with supernatural powers to win big at a casino. But at the game he finds himself up against a much stronger mystical rival and ends up in a deadlock putting in danger himself and his team that he has grown to love. It stars Miloš Biković, Antonio Banderas and Lyubov Aksyonova.

The film was released in Russia on March 1, 2018.

== Plot ==
Michael is a talented gambler who thinks through his every move and counts only on himself. He plans a heist at a luxury European casino. He implements his scheme brilliantly, until he runs up against a mysterious rival, Alex, at a poker table. During the game Michael's cards mysteriously change in his hands. He loses all his winnings, and his scheme is ruined. Victor— a cruel and dangerous casino owner — is sure that Michael and Alex work together. Victor says that Michael must repay a huge debt — everything that Alex won — and gives him a week to comply.

Michael seems to be facing a deadlock but gathers a team of experts with superpowers to quickly win at a casino and repay the debt. The superpowers of his team members help Michael skip a long preparation process. Eric is a rich kid, a party boy who has a slight power of telekinesis. He uses his power to move small objects (such as a roulette ball or dice). Tony is a taxi driver who controls electronics, devices and tools. For example, he can turn a camera away at the right time. Kevin is an autistic hypnotist who can implant any thought into anyone's mind for a short interval. Veronika is a telepath who can hear and transmit thoughts at a distance. Her power helps Michael communicate with his team so that no security service can overhear them.

Michael and his 'supernatural' team go to a casino to win big. He finds himself up against his mysterious rival, and this places him and his team in danger.

== Cast ==
- Miloš Biković as Michael
- Antonio Banderas as Gordon
- Lyubov Aksyonova as Veronika, telepath.
- Yevgeny Stychkin as Tony, controls electronics.
- Yuri Chursin as Kevin, hypnotist, member of the scam team Michael
- Aristarkh Venes as Eric, telekinesis.
- Petar Zekavica as Alex
- Sergey Astakhov as Victor
- Nikita Dyuvbanov as Leon
- Alessandra Starr Ward as female supervisor

== Production ==
Director Aleksandr Boguslavskiy decided to play Biković in roulette. Bikovich won and his remark was added to the film.

Producers turned to the casino's security chief for advice on making the film realistic.

Scenes in an underground casino, in a plane and in a forest were shot in a real Ilyushin Il-76 airplane, inside of which a game room was built.

=== Filming ===
Filming lasted a month during March–February 2016.

Casino scenes were filmed in Oracul casino, located in Azov-City, the first federal gambling zone on the border of the Rostov Oblast and the Krasnodar Krai. They filmed in former gambling establishment Golden Palace Casino. A number of scenes were filmed in the hotel Kosmos (both buildings are located in Moscow).
