= The Poison Rose =

2019 American thriller film by George Gallo and Francesco Cinquemani

- Theatrical release poster
- Directed by: George Gallo; Francesco Cinquemani
- Written by: Richard Salvatore; Francesco Cinquemani; Luca Giliberto
- Based on: The Poison Rose by Richard Salvatore
- Produced by: Jeff Elliott; Oscar Generale; Andrea Iervolino; Richard Salvatore
- Starring: John Travolta; Morgan Freeman; Famke Janssen; Kat Graham; Peter Stormare; Blerim Destani; Alice Pagani; Robert Patrick; Brendan Fraser
- Cinematography: Terry Stacey
- Edited by: Yvan Gauthier
- Music by: Aldo Shllaku; Marcus Sjowall
- Production companies: Grindstone Entertainment Group; Iervolino Entertainment; Millennium Media; March On Productions
- Distributed by: Lionsgate
- Release date: May 24, 2019 (United States)
- Running time: 98 minutes
- Country: United States
- Language: English
- Box office: $323,754

The Poison Rose (released internationally as Eye for an Eye) is a 2019 American thriller film starring John Travolta and Morgan Freeman. The film was directed by George Gallo and Francesco Cinquemani. It was written by Richard Salvatore, Francesco Cinquemani, and Luca Giliberto, based on Salvatore's novel of the same title. The film was released on May 24, 2019 by Lionsgate, and was panned by critics. The film was also a commercial failure, grossing only $323,754.

The film received the best directing international award at the Terra di Siena Film Festival.

== Plot ==
Set in 1978, the plot centers on Los Angeles private investigator Carson Phillips. He is hired to conduct an investigation in his Texas hometown where mental facility patient Barbara Van Poole has been incommunicado for some time, which has her L.A.-based niece worried about her well-being.

Upon reaching the sanatorium, Phillips notices that the staff all look nervous when he asks for her. Dr. Miles, the head doctor, is evasive and strings him along for several days. Phillips never gets to see Mrs. Van Poole. Breaking into a rear wing of the facility, Phillips is surprised to find mostly empty rooms in the "thriving enterprise".

Going to a high-toned gambling casino run by local powerbroker Doc, Phillips is greeted cheerfully by people from the old days, at least on the surface. Doc proves to be the "wild card"---eventually nodding to Phillips' investigations, as they are taking out his competition.

He meets up with his ex-wife, Jayne, and her daughter, Becky, who is married to a star quarterback, Happy. One night during a game, Happy suddenly dies and the police suspect Becky of killing him.

Jayne asks Phillips for help. Becky was being abused by Happy, but since he was the star quarterback, the police would not arrest him.

Phillips learns he is Becky’s father.

Phillips learns that Dr. Miles was killing off patients who were not financially supported by their families, Barbara Van Poole included, and collecting their social security money. Dr. Miles was using the money to finance a secret drug laboratory on the grounds; which Phillips sets afire. Phillips uncovers the truth and Dr. Miles is shot dead by a patient.

After Phillips and Jayne reconcile, he finds a bottle of cancer pills. This same substance was found in Happy's blood. He accuses her of "doing anything to protect her daughter" and realizes that she was the one who poisoned Happy. Becky comes out and asks her if she did it. At first Jayne denies everything, but then admits that she thought that Happy would kill Becky and since she herself did not have long to live, no one would be left to protect her daughter. Becky forgives her.

The movie ends with Phillips stating that he was going to go home, then realizes he is home, implying he stays with Jayne and Becky instead of going back to Los Angeles.

== Cast ==
- John Travolta as PI Carson Phillips
- Morgan Freeman as Doc
- Brendan Fraser as Dr. Miles Mitchell
- Famke Janssen as Jayne Hunt
- Ella Bleu Travolta as Rebecca "Becky" Hunt
- Robert Patrick as Sheriff Bing Walsh
- Peter Stormare as Slide Olsen
- Kat Graham as Rose
- Blerim Destani as Lorenzo
- Devin Ellery as Happy Chandler
- Alice Pagani as Violet Gregory
- Nick Vallelonga as Nick the Giant Bodyguard
- Ashton Mosely as Doc's Butler
- Anson Downes as Motel Desk Clerk

== Production ==
Forest Whitaker was previously in talks to portray Dr. Mitchell before Brendan Fraser assumed the role.

Principal photography took place in Savannah, Georgia, in June 2018 and continued in Italy after the summer.

The football player's name, Happy Chandler, is an "inside joke". Happy Chandler was the Commissioner of Baseball in the 1940's and 1950's.

== Release ==
The film was released on May 24, 2019 by Lionsgate. The film was dedicated in memory of Steve and Geraldine Salvatore, the parents of Richard Salvatore, who wrote the novel, The Poison Rose.

=== Box office ===
As of May 25, 2024, The Poison Rose grossed $323,754 in the United Arab Emirates, Portugal, Ukraine, Lithuania, Russia, Serbia and Montenegro.

=== Critical reception ===
On the review aggregator website Rotten Tomatoes, 0% of 11 critics' reviews are positive, with an average rating of 3/10. Metacritic, which uses a weighted average, assigned the film a score of 26 out of 100, based on 5 critics, indicating "generally unfavorable" reviews.

The Guardian described it as a "ridiculous and mostly boring hardboiled thriller".
