= Black Butterfly (2017 film) =

- Theatrical release poster
- Directed by: Brian Goodman
- Screenplay by: Marc Frydman; Justin Stanley
- Based on: Papillon Noir by Christian Faure
- Produced by: Monika Bacardi; Alberto Burgueño; Marc Frydman; Juan Antonio García Peredo; Andrea Iervolino; Alexandra Klim; Silvio Muraglia
- Starring: Antonio Banderas; Jonathan Rhys Meyers; Piper Perabo; Abel Ferrara; Vincent Riotta; Nathalie Rapti Gomez; Randall Paul; Katie McGovern
- Cinematography: José David Montero
- Edited by: Julia Juaniz; Mark Sult
- Music by: Federico Jusid
- Production companies: Ambi Pictures; Battleplan Productions; Compadre Entertainment; Paradox Studios
- Distributed by: Lionsgate Premiere
- Release date: May 26, 2017
- Running time: 93 minutes
- Country: United States
- Language: English
- Budget: $5.5 million
- Box office: $391,431

Black Butterfly is a 2017 American thriller film directed by Brian Goodman and written by Marc Frydman and Justin Stanley. The film stars Antonio Banderas, Jonathan Rhys Meyers, Piper Perabo, Abel Ferrara, Vincent Riotta and Nathalie Rapti Gomez. It was released on May 26, 2017, by Lionsgate Premiere. It is based on a 2008 French television film, Papillon Noir, directed by Christian Faure.

== Plot ==
Paul, a reclusive writer, is typing into his typewriter the words "I'm stuck" over and over. Falling asleep, he awakes the next morning when his real estate agent Laura comes over with prospective buyers for his house and farm. Paul makes plans to meet her for lunch, then goes into town for errands.

Along the way, Paul has a confrontation with a truck driver when he attempts to pass. Eventually Paul passes, does his errands and arrives at the Diner to meet Laura. While there, the truck driver arrives and confronts Paul. A man sitting nearby grabs the truck driver by the neck and throws him out of the restaurant. The man leaves the restaurant and starts walking away. Paul leaves Laura at the restaurant and arranges to meet her for dinner.

On his drive back, Paul spots the man walking along the road and picks him up. Paul learns the man is a drifter with no place to stay and offers to put him up for a few nights. Jack, the drifter accepts. Along the way, they see that power and communication lines are down. Jack sees that Paul is alone and Paul explains that his wife left him and he wants to move away.

Jack takes over the cooking and does odd jobs around the cabin, while continually pushing Paul, saying he has no ideas. One morning, Paul is awoken by Jack putting a knife blade to his neck. Paul attempts to leave the cabin but Jack points a gun and sends Paul back into the house. Without phone or internet, Paul has no way to send a cry for help. Resigned, he writes a few pages of a screenplay, but Jack rejects it and throws it into the fire.

One morning groceries are delivered and Paul is forced at gunpoint to accept the groceries without arousing suspicion. The next day, Laura arrives to talk to Paul, but Jack intervenes and forces Paul and Laura to push her car into the farm's pond. While Laura and Paul are held at gunpoint, the sheriff arrives. Paul attempts to alert the sheriff, but Jack grabs the sheriff, shoves him into his police car and shoots him. Jack drags Laura into a side room and sounds of a struggle are heard, then quiet.

Jack ties Paul up in his room, but Paul unties himself, grabs his rifle and confronts Jack. He begins a monologue with Jack, saying how lucky he is that Jack has shown up, as he now has someone to implicate for the murders that he has committed. He takes out a box he has kept hidden containing mementoes of the killings and puts the mementoes into Jack's bag. He fires the rifle at Jack, but it is filled with blanks. Jack overpowers Paul and knocks him out.

Paul awakes, handcuffed to a chair with numerous FBI agents gathering evidence. He realizes that he has been tricked by Jack and that Laura and the sheriff are alive, both FBI agents. Jack reveals that they have been tracking him for several years for four murders, starting with Paul's wife. Jack asks Paul to provide the locations of the bodies of the victims, but Paul refuses, elaborating on how he would say in court that everything he said in his confession was not the truth, only part of his script, and that the mementoes were planted.

Meanwhile, the FBI agents search the farm but cannot find any evidence of Paul's wife's body. Jack studies a picture that Paul had of his wife. In the background, the farm is depicted before it had a pond. Now convinced that she is buried under the pond, he confronts Paul. Paul offers to give up the victims' locations in exchange for not receiving the death penalty. Jack turns him down, saying "I like my ending better."

Paul wakes up on his couch and sees his typewriter with the "I'm stuck" text and realizes it was a dream. He puts a fresh sheet of paper into the typewriter and types the words 'Black Butterfly', as the title for a new work.

== Cast ==
- Antonio Banderas as Paul Lopez
- Jonathan Rhys Meyers as Jack
- Piper Perabo as Laura Johnson
- Abel Ferrara as Pat
- Vincent Riotta as Lt. Carcano
- Nathalie Rapti Gomez as Julie
- Randall Paul as Mr. Owen
- Katie McGovern as Nancy Barrows
- Brian Goodman as Truck Driver / Agent Rothwell

== Release ==
The film was released on May 26, 2017, by Lionsgate Premiere.

== Critical response ==
The review aggregator website Rotten Tomatoes gives the film an approval rating of 40% based on 20 reviews with an average rating of 4.9/10. At Metacritic, the film has an average score of 43 out of 100 based on 7 critics, indicating "mixed or average" reviews.
