= Paradox Effect =

- Theatrical release poster
- Directed by: Scott Weintrob
- Written by: Samuel Bartlett; Andrea Iervolino; Ferdinando Dell'Omo
- Produced by: Andrea Iervolino; Richard Salvatore; Danielle Maloni; Bret Saxon; Jeff Bowler
- Starring: Olga Kurylenko; Harvey Keitel; Alice Astons
- Cinematography: Tobia Sempi
- Edited by: Marco Perez
- Music by: Mokadelic
- Production companies: Iervolino & Lady Bacardi Entertainment
- Distributed by: Gravitas Ventures
- Release dates: October 31, 2023 (Rome Film Festival); September 24, 2024 (United States)
- Running time: 87 minutes
- Country: United States
- Language: English

Paradox Effect is a 2023 American action film written by Samuel Bartlett, Andrea Iervolino and Ferdinando Dell'Omo, directed by Scott Weintrob and starring Olga Kurylenko, Harvey Keitel and Alice Astons.

After witnessing a murder, an ex-junkie is forced to cooperate with the killer to save her daughter's life. She must fight time, the police and the criminal underworld to save the only person who means something to her.

== Cast ==
- Harvey Keitel as Silvio
- Olga Kurylenko as Karina
- Oliver Trevena as Covek
- Alice Astons as Lucy
- Meredith Mickelson as Gia
- Talia Asseraf as Renee
- Enjy Kiwan as Officer Valentina Rossi

== Production ==
In December 2022, it was announced that Keitel and Kurylenko were cast in the film. In January 2023, it was announced that filming occurred in Italy.

== Release ==
The film premiered at the 2023 Rome Film Festival. The film was released on video on demand on September 24, 2024.
