= Hope Lost =

- Promotional poster
- Directed by: David Petrucci
- Written by: Francesco Trento; Damiano Giacomelli; Francesco Teresi; Loretta Tersigni
- Produced by: Andrea Iervolin; Cosetta Turco; Monika Bacardi; Danielle Maloni
- Starring: Danny Trejo; Mischa Barton; Michael Madsen; Daniel Baldwin
- Narrated by: Danny Trejo
- Cinematography: Davide Manca
- Edited by: David Petrucci
- Release date: 20 February 2015 (Los Angeles Italia Film Festival)
- Running time: 94 mins
- Country: Italy
- Language: English

Hope Lost is an Italian English-language sex trafficking thriller directed by David Petrucci. The film stars Danny Trejo, Mischa Barton, Michael Madsen and Daniel Baldwin. The film chronicles the struggles of a young Romanian woman trafficked to Italy. Filming took place in Rome in 2014 and the film premiered at the Los Angeles Italia Film Festival on 20 February 2015.

== Plot summary ==
A young Romanian woman from a small town meets a man claiming to be a film director and he convinces her to come to Rome for auditions. This is a ruse and she is instead lured into a life of prostitution in Italy and then sold by her pimp to a man who intends to torture her and another young woman in a snuff movie.

== Cast ==
- Danny Trejo as Marius
- Mischa Barton as Alina
- Michael Madsen as Manol
- Daniel Baldwin as Ettore
- Francesca Agostini as Sofia
- Andrey Chernyshov as Gabriel
