= Soraya Azzabi =

Canadian actress

Soraya Azzabi (/soraya/ /azzabi/) is a Moroccan-Canadian model, actor, fashion entrepreneur and on-air personality from Montreal, Quebec. She is signed by agency Brave Model Management.

In 2010, Azzabi co-represented the eastern realm at the finale of the Elite Model Look World competition.

In 2013, she reported for District Montreal, a local magazine, during Montreal Fashion Week. She has also hosted various projects with Quebec magazine, The Scope.

In 2019, she made her voice-acting debut in the animated family film, Arctic Dogs.
