= Eliana Jones =

Canadian actress

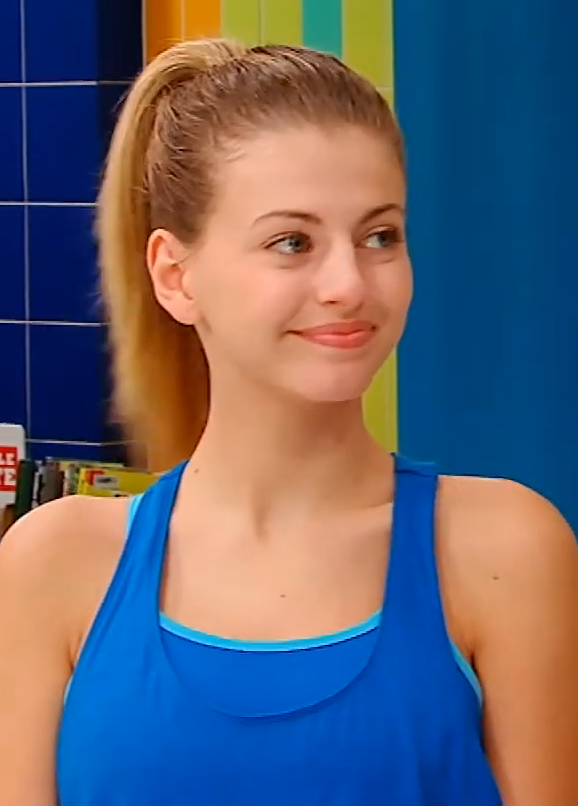
- Jones in The Stanley Dynamic
- Born: Toronto, Ontario, Canada
- Occupation: Actress
- Years active: 2010–present

Eliana Jones is a Canadian actress. She first came to attention as the younger version of the Alex character on Nikita (2010–2012), and in the recurring role of Alexa Sworn, one of the twin daughters of the sheriff, in the television series Hemlock Grove (2013).

== Career ==
Jones wanted to become an actress when her mom took her to an acting class. After the class, Jones thought it was very enjoyable. As a result, Jones quit gymnastics, which she had been doing for six years and started taking acting classes. Jones played the recurring role of Young Alex, appearing in nine episodes of Nikita. She has said that she decided she wanted to commit to professional acting after her time on Nikita. In 2018, Jones co-starred as Lara in the psychological thriller film, Nomis, also known as Night Hunter. In 2019, Jones portrayed Gwen in the Canadian drama television series, Northern Rescue. In 2021, she was cast in a role in the American biographical drama Lamborghini: The Man Behind the Legend.

== Filmography ==
Television and film roles
Year	Title	Role	Notes
2010–2012	Nikita	Young Alex	Recurring role (seasons 1–2)
2012	Skatoony	Contestant	Episode: "Sports Academy"
2013	Hemlock Grove	Alexa Sworn	Recurring role (season 1)
2013	Port Hope	Greer Somerset	Television film
2013	Lost Girl	Teen Tamsin	Episodes: "Turn to Stone", "Sleeping Beauty School"
2013	Step Dogs	Lacey	Film
2014–2016	Saving Hope	Molly Kinney	4 episodes
2014–2016	The Stanley Dynamic	Summer	Recurring role
2016	The Swap	Aspen Bishop	Disney Channel Original Movie
2016	Double Mommy	Kristin	Television film
2016	Backstage	Mel	Episodes: "Juggle", "Dig Deeper"
2016	Neverknock	Sydney	Television film
2017	Supergirl	Josie	Episode: "Midvale"
2017–2018	Heartland	Peyton Westfield	Recurring role (season 11), 5 episodes
2018	Night Hunter	Lara	Film; originally titled Nomis
2019	Northern Rescue	Gwen	Recurring role
2021	Acapulco	Becca	2 episodes
2022-2025	Shoresy	Mercedes	7 episodes
2022	Lamborghini: The Man Behind the Legend	Billie Alland	Film
