= Arctic Dogs =

2019 animated film directed by Aaron Woodley

- Theatrical release poster
- Directed by: Aaron Woodley
- Written by: Bob Barlen; Cal Brunker; Aaron Woodley; Bryan Thompson
- Produced by: Monika Bacardi; Andrea Iervolino; Graham Moloy
- Starring: Jeremy Renner; Heidi Klum; James Franco; John Cleese; Omar Sy; Michael Madsen; Laurie Holden; Anjelica Huston; Alec Baldwin
- Edited by: Lesley Mackay Hunter
- Music by: David Buckley
- Production companies: AMBI Media Group; AIC Studios; TATATU; Assemblage Entertainment
- Distributed by: Entertainment Studios Motion Pictures (United States); Cineplex Entertainment (Canada); Notorious Pictures (Italy)
- Release dates: November 1, 2019 (United States/Canada); September 17, 2020 (Italy)
- Running time: 92 minutes
- Countries: United States; Canada; Italy; India
- Language: English
- Budget: $50 million
- Box office: $11.3 million

Arctic Dogs (also known as Arctic Justice internationally or Polar Squad in the UK) is a 2019 animated comedy film co-written and directed by Aaron Woodley and co-directed by Dimos Vrysellas. The film stars the voices of Jeremy Renner, Heidi Klum, James Franco, John Cleese, Omar Sy, Michael Madsen, Laurie Holden, Anjelica Huston and Alec Baldwin. The film centers around an arctic fox delivery worker as he and his cohorts attempt to stop a walrus from attempting to melt the ice caps.

Entertainment Studios released Arctic Dogs on November 1, 2019, in Canada and the United States. The film was a major critical and commercial failure, grossing less than a fifth of its production budget of $50 million.

Despite its reception, the film spawned a franchise, including a web series and multiple spin-off series and films.

== Plot ==
Swifty is an Arctic fox who works in the mailroom of Taigasville's Arctic Blast Delivery Service, who dreams of become the top dog of the company, but is unfit of doing so due to his breed. One day, while on his first time delivering packages, he ends up at a hidden fortress overseen by Otto Von Walrus, along with his puffin henchmen. Visiting his red fox friend, Jade, he shares his discoveries to her and about his first job. That night, the delivery service's top dogs, Siberian Huskies Duke, Dakota, and Dusty, are abducted by some of Walrus' henchmen. The following day, the delivery service mourns over their disappearance.

That day, Swifty is visited by two otters named Bertha and Leopold, who warn him about Walrus' henchmen. Magda, the service's head caribou, allows Swifty to take the top dogs place for delivering packages. During his job, he visits Walrus again. Sneaking into the fortress, he discovers Walrus' plan to drill into the surface at Taigasville's surface to unleash masses of ancient gas to melt the Arctic. Returning to the delivery service, he tries to warn their crew members about Walrus' plan, but to no avail. Meanwhile, Jade is abducted by Walrus' henchmen, and taken to his fortress. Walrus then forces her to complete his drill. The following day, Swifty learns about Jade's kidnapping, and tells P.B., his best friend, about the fortress and the kidnapping of the top dogs and Jade.

He is again visited by Bertha and Leopold, who explain to him about the Walrus' plan. That night, they capture photos of their plans, and warn the citizens of Taigasville about their plan. Magda explains that Walrus once worked at the delivery service after being kicked out from his original work place at the ocean. However, Walrus was fired from the service after trying to invent a pneumatic tube system powered by the gas, deeming it to be dangerous. Determined to stop him, Swifty rallies his friends to storm Walrus' fortress. However, during their plan, they end up imprisoned by Walrus. There, they reconcile with the top dogs and Jade. Swifty tearfully admits to her about her being an engineer, but she does admit for being back with him. Walrus descends their cage into an vat of boiling water to try to execute the group, before setting out to Taigasville. Upon arrival, he activates his drill to try to unleash the gas, terrorizing the city in the process.

The group manages to escape, and return to Taigasville. While his friends take out most of Walrus' henchmen, Swifty is able to reach the control panel and stop the drill, causing it to explode. Walrus is then sent to prison by the citizens of Taigasville. His friends hail him for being a hero and a top dog. The next day, the delivery service has been changed by Swifty, while he and Jade become a couple.

== Voice cast ==
- Jeremy Renner as Swifty, an Arctic fox
  - Anderson Lewis as Young Swifty
- Alec Baldwin as P.B., a polar bear and Swifty's best friend
- Heidi Klum as Jade, a red fox
  - Lillian Moloy as Young Jade
  - Klum also voices Bertha, an Eurasian otter
- John Cleese as Otto Von Walrus, a walrus
- Anjelica Huston as Magda, a Russian-accented caribou
- James Franco as Lemmy, a scatter-brained albatross
- Omar Sy as Leopold, an Eurasian otter
- Michael Madsen as Duke, a Siberian Husky
- Laurie Holden as Dakota, a Siberian Husky
- Donny Falsetti as Dusty, a Siberian Husky
- Nina Senicar as Countdown Inka
- Aaron Woodley as Puffin Leader, a horned puffin
- Soraya Azzabi as Alma
- Jason Deline as "Nasty Naz" Narwhal, a narwhal

== Production ==
The film was announced as Arctic Justice: Thunder Squad on August 30, 2014 with AMBI themselves handling international sales. At that time, Matthew Lyon was originally tapped to direct. The film's cast was announced on May 5, 2015 during the 2015 Cannes International Film Festival with Dimos Vrysellas taking over as the director. On August 24, 2016, Jeremy Renner joined the cast.

== Release ==
On February 14, 2017 Open Road Films acquired the North American distribution rights to the film and was originally scheduled to be released on an undisclosed 2018 date. The film was acquired by Entertainment Studios Motion Pictures in the United States and Canada due to Open Road Films' bankruptcy and solely released on November 1, 2019. Lionsgate Home Entertainment released it on DVD and Blu-ray on February 4, 2020. It made $1.3 million in total US video sales. The film was released in Italy digitally on September 17, 2020.

== Reception ==
=== Box office ===
In the United States and Canada, Arctic Dogs was released alongside Harriet, Terminator: Dark Fate and Motherless Brooklyn and was projected to gross $5–10 million from 2,835 theaters in its opening weekend. It made $700,000 on its first day and ended up debuting to just $2.9 million, finishing 10th and marking the worst opening of all-time for a film playing in over 2,800 theaters.

=== Critical response ===
On the review aggregator website Rotten Tomatoes, the film holds an approval rating of 13% based on 16 reviews and an average rating of 3.5/10. Metacritic, assigned the film a weighted average score of 28 out of 100, based on four critics, indicating "generally unfavorable" reviews. Audiences polled by CinemaScore gave the film an average grade of "B−" on an A+ to F scale, while those surveyed at PostTrak gave it an overall positive score of 64% and a 41% "definite recommend".

Many critics panned the film's lack of originality. The Hollywood Reporter wrote: "Lacking much in the way of humor or charm, the film [...] culminates with the sort of frenetic, action-laden climatic sequence that has become de rigueur for these offerings". CinemaBlend called the film half-baked: " [...] it's [..] made excessively clear that the movie has no desire to access any depth if it [..] means slowly down the A-to-B plot in any way, and/or [...] get[s] in the way of juvenile jokes that have been tired for two decades[.]"

The film's more positive reception was also not without criticism. TheWrap's William Bibbiani, noted that "[t]he story is at its best when Cleese's eccentric supervillain is on-screen. The rest of the time it's merely a functional series of events[.]" Bibbiani would go on to say that the film "[...] is a functional, distracting kids flick that's only remarkable in how unremarkable it is."

In 2020, it received a Canadian Cinema Editors Awards nomination for Best Editing in Animation.

== Animated series and spin-off films ==
A web series set after the events of the film titled Arctic Friends was released in September 2020 on both Apple TV+ and Amazon Prime Video, consisting of 40 collections (160 shorts). Another spin-off series titled Puffins was also released, featuring the voice of Johnny Depp as Johnny Puff. A spin-off of Puffins, entitled Puffins Impossible, was released in April 2022, with Depp reprising his role as Puff. There are also two Christmas live action/animation spin-off films titled Christmas Thieves (2021) and The Good Witch of Christmas (2022).

=== Spin-off animated films ===
- Arctic Friends: In Search of the Arctic Idol
- Arctic Friends: Swifty
- Arctic Friends: The Magic Portal
- Johnny Puff: Secret Mission
- Mini Puffins
- Puffins: The Walrus Who Wanted Too Much
- Puffins: A Stellar Adventure
- Puffins: Arctic Games
- Baby Puffins & Bunny
- Robo Puffin
