= In the Fire (film) =

2023 thriller film

- Theatrical release poster
- Directed by: Conor Allyn
- Written by: Conor Allyn; Pascal Borno; Silvio Muraglia
- Produced by: Andrea Iervolino; Monika Bacardi; Pascal Borno; Alain Gillissen; Silvio Muraglia
- Starring: Amber Heard; Eduardo Noriega; Lorenzo McGovern Zaini
- Cinematography: Matt Bendo; Simone Mogliè
- Edited by: Marco Perez
- Music by: Teho Teardo
- Production companies: Iervolino & Lady Bacardi Entertainment; Paradox Studios; Angel Oak Films; Margate House Films
- Distributed by: Saban Films
- Release dates: June 24, 2023 (Taormina); October 13, 2023 (United States)
- Countries: United States; Italy
- Language: English
- Box office: $22,050

In the Fire is a 2023 thriller film directed by Conor Allyn, from a screenplay by Allyn, Pascal Borno and Silvio Muraglia. It stars Amber Heard, Eduardo Noriega and Lorenzo McGovern Zaini.

It had its world premiere at the Taormina Film Festival on June 24, 2023, and was released in the United States on October 13, 2023, by Saban Films.

== Plot ==
A doctor travels to a remote plantation to care for a boy who has unexplainable abilities.

The story follows Grace Burnham, an alienist who has come from New York to a small village in Colombia to help out a young boy called Martin Marquez, the son of Nicolas Marquez, the local ranch owner. When Burnham arrives at the ranch, Nicolas tells her to go home; however, Burnham says she will look after Martin. Father Antonio also points out that the train only comes once a week. Burnham discovers that Martin is kept locked in his room. When Burnham meets Martin, he tells her that he killed his mother, Isabella. Martin explains that his mother was teaching him to ride, but she lost control and was trampled to death by the horse.

Father Antonio explains that when Martin was born, the locusts arrived and ate the crops. The next day, Burnham goes with Father Antonio and Martin to where Martin's mother is buried to pray. While praying, they are visited by Father Gavira and two of the locals. Father Gavira hates Martin and has got the villagers believing that Martin is the Antichrist. Martin goes over to one of the horses and causes it to panic, and the rider accidentally shoots Farther Gavira in the arm. Farther Gavira orders them to capture Martin, Father Antonio holds them off while Burnham takes Martin back home. Back at Martin's home, Burnham and Nicolas help a severely wounded Father Antonio. Nicolas explains that Father Gavira wanted to perform an exorcism on Martin, but Nicolas refused, and now the village blames Martin for everything. Nicolas has been forced to kill his cattle after they caught a disease. One of Nicolas' employees arrives and tells him that the animals in the village are sick as well, and they are blaming Martin. Burnham tells Nicolas to leave, but Nicolas refuses. Later that day, Nicolas explains that when Isabella was pregnant with their second child, the child was stillborn, because the child was not baptised Father Gavira said the child couldn't be buried in the cemetery so Nicolas buried the child near the lake. Martin, wanting to stop his mother crying, dug the child back up to give to his mother. Burnham believes that Martin has savant syndrome and goes to the village to explain it to Father Gavira. The villagers then try to have Burnham flogged in public until Nicolas comes to her rescue.

Later that night, members of the village attack Nicolas's stable. When Martin enters the stable, it catches fire. Nicolas takes the dead villagers' corpse back to the village and leaves it outside Father Gavira's Church. Farther Antonio now believes that Burnham was sent by God to help the village, that God keeps his faith in mankind even when they lose faith in him. The next day, Burnham questions Martin about his mother, then Martin asks Burnham what she is afraid of, and she confesses that she will never be any good at what she does. Later that night, the maid dies from the disease, and Burnham starts to doubt herself, yet Nicolas encourages her that she has helped his son. Nicolas decides that Martin and Burnham should leave the village, and Father Gavira then organizes the village to attack the ranch. Father Antonio tries to reason with the mob, but Father Gavira kills him. Burnham tries to escape with Martin, but they are captured by the villagers. Father Gavira tries to kill Martin, but a fatally wounded Nicolas arrives. Martin seems to control the fire and kills most of the villagers. Father Gavira then tries to shoot Martin, but his gun backfires, killing him. Nicolas, Martin, and Burnham manage to reach the train station. Nicolas dies from his wounds, and Burnham takes Martin away.

== Cast ==
- Amber Heard as Grace Burnham
- Eduardo Noriega as Nicolas Marquez
- Lorenzo McGovern Zaini as Martin Marquez
- Luca Calvani as Father Antonio
- Yari Gugliucci as Father Gavira
- Sophie Amber as Isabella
- Monica Contini Maria
- Herbert Ignacio as Temo

== Production ==
In February 2022, Amber Heard and Eduardo Noriega joined the cast of the film, with Conor Allyn set to direct from a screenplay by himself, Pascal Borno and Silvio Muraglia and Saban Films set to distribute.

Principal photography took place in Guatemala and Ostuni, Italy, in mid-2022.

== Release ==
The film had its world premiere at the Taormina Film Festival on June 24, 2023. It was released in the United States on October 13, 2023.

== Reception ==
On the review aggregator website Rotten Tomatoes, 21% of 14 critics' reviews are positive, with an average rating of 4.3/10.

Brian Lowry, writing for CNN, called the film "a pretty awful starring vehicle for the actor that she also produced, a film unlikely to produce many sparks beyond those set off by the morbidly curious". Top critic Sara Michelle Fetters criticized the film's plot as "unoriginal", but praised its visuals and costumes as "all suitably authentic" and "solid". Fetters also praised its editing and the performances by the cast members, particularly singling out Heard's performance by noting that, "Heard's work here as a late-19th century doctor researching the supposed possession of a young child is excellent."
