= Fastest Car =

- Genre: Reality television
- Created by: Scott Weintrob
- Country of origin: United States
- No. of seasons: 2
- No. of episodes: 15

Production
- Executive producers: Al Edgington, Joe LaBracio, Dawn Ostroff, Scott Weintrob, and Jeremy Finn
- Running time: 40–52 minutes
- Production companies: Conde Nast Entertainment and Large Eyes

Original release
- Network: Netflix
- Release: April 6, 2018 – September 20, 2019

Fastest Car is a Netflix original series which premiered on April 6, 2018. It is a reality-show where drivers of stock exotic supercars go up against sleeper cars in a quarter-mile drag race.

The series, which serves as Netflix's first global automotive series, was created by Scott Weintrob and produced by Conde Nast Entertainment and Large Eyes for the streaming service. Executive producers of the show include Al Edgington, Joe LaBracio, Dawn Ostroff, Scott Weintrob, and Jeremy Finn.

On August 14, 2018, Netflix renewed the series for a second season. The second season launched on September 20, 2019, and features seven episodes. Al Edgington, Joe LaBracio, Scott Weintrob, and Jeremy Finn returned as executive producers.

== Premise ==
In each episode, there are three sleeper cars going up against one supercar in a quarter-mile drag race. The winners of each episode get to move on to the championship race at the end of the season.

Supercars include a Lamborghini Aventador, Lamborghini Huracán, Ford GT, Ferrari 458, Ferrari 488, Dodge Viper, McLaren MP4, McLaren 675LT, McLaren 650S, and McLaren 720S.

== Episodes ==
=== Series overview ===
Season	Episodes	Originally released
1	8	April 6, 2018
2	7	September 20, 2019

Supercars are in bold.

=== Season 1 (2018) ===
Episode	Title	Results			
Episode	Title	1st Place	2nd Place	3rd Place	4th Place
1	"David vs. Goliath"	1927 Dodge Hot Rod	**2006 Ford GT**	1964 Chevy C10	2014 Honda Odyssey
2	"Built Not Bought"	**2016 Lamborghini Huracán**	1946 Plymouth Coupe	1987 Chevrolet Monte Carlo SS	1971 Ford Pinto
3	"Revenge"	1987 Ford Thunderbird	**2016 Dodge Viper ACR-E**	1992 Chevy S10	1979 Cadillac Coupe de ville
4	"King of the World" (Note: The Lamborghini and Camaro jumped the line before the light hit green and were disqualified.)	1992 Plymouth Colt	1984 Chevrolet C10	DSQ 1987 Chevrolet Camaro	DSQ **2016 Lamborghini SV**
5	"Racing Is My Drug" (Note: The Toyota Supra failed to start due to engine problems and never entered the race.)	**2016 Ferrari 488 GTB**	1996 Chevrolet Impala SS	1984 Oldsmobile Cutlass	DNS 1983 Toyota Supra
6	"Motor City Mayhem" (Note: The McLaren and Chevy Van finished first and second, respectively, but were disqualified afterwards for conducting two burnouts before the start of the race. The rules clearly stated only one burnout was allowed before the race. The GMC Sonoma and Buick Grand National were, therefore, granted a second race seven days later with the GMC Sonoma winning.)	1994 GMC Sonoma	1984 Buick Grand National	DSQ **2013 McLaren MP4**	DSQ 1978 Chevy Van
7	"Electric vs. Gas" (Note: The Datsun lost control at the start of the race and crashed into the RX-2 causing them both to go off the track, resulting in neither car finishing.)	2005 Dodge Ram 3500	**2016 Lamborghini Aventador SV**	DNF 1973 Mazda RX-2	DNF 1972 Datsun 1200 (electric)

=== Championship (2018) ===
Episode	Title	Results						
Episode	Title	1st Place	2nd Place	3rd Place	4th Place	5th Place	6th Place	7th Place
8	"Showdown at El Mirage"	**Lamborghini Huracán**	Ford Thunderbird	**Ferrari 488 GTB**	Dodge Hot Rod	GMC Sonoma	Plymouth Colt	Dodge Ram 3500

=== Season 2 (2019) ===
Episode	Title	Results			
Episode	Title	1st Place	2nd Place	3rd Place	4th Place
1	"Honda Power"	1992 Honda Civic	1992 Eagle Talon	**2018 Lamborghini Hurácan Performante Spyder**	1972 Chevrolet Caprice
2	"We Created a Monster"	2001 Ford Mustang GT	**2016 McLaren 650S**	1966 Chevrolet Bel Air Wagon	1998 Honda Civic Hatchback
3	"Not Your Typical Supercar Driver"	**2018 McLaren 720S**	1980 Oldsmobile Custom Cruiser	1984 Oldsmobile Cutlass	1995 Ford Taurus
4	"Hell and Back"	2005 Pontiac GTO	1974 Mini Cooper	**2016 McLaren 675LT**	1995 Nissan 240sx
5	"Saved by Speed"	1989 Ford Mustang (NotchBack)	1983 Buick Regal	1973 Chevrolet Vega Wagon	**2015 Ferrari 458 Speciale Aperta**
6	"Ludicrous Speed"	1989 Ford Mustang (FastBack)	1990 Nissan 300ZX	**2016 Tesla Model S P100D**	1977 Toyota Hilux

=== Championship (2019) ===
Episode	Title	Results					
Episode	Title	1st Place	2nd Place	3rd Place	4th Place	5th Place	6th Place
7	"Race of Champions" (Note: The 1989 Ford Mustang (FastBack) lost control 3/4 of the way down the track taking a hard left and crossing 4 other lanes and drivers, crashing before crossing the finish line.)	**McLaren 720S**	Ford Mustang GT	Ford Mustang (NotchBack)	Pontiac GTO	Honda Civic	DNF Ford Mustang (FastBack)

== Production ==
=== Filming ===
==== Season 1 ====
Barstow-Daggett Airport in San Bernardino County, California, served as the drag strip for episodes 1, 2, 5, and 7. Caddo Mills, Texas, was the filming location in episode 3. Calverton Executive Airpark in Calverton, New York, was used as the drag strip in episode 4. Coleman A. Young International Airport in Detroit, Michigan, was used as the drag strip in episode 6. El Mirage Lake dry lake bed in the Mojave Desert, within San Bernardino County, California, served as the drag strip for the championship in episode 8.

==== Season 2 ====
Sebring International Raceway in Sebring, Florida, served as the drag strip in episode 1. The decommissioned airfield at Marine Corps Air Station El Toro near Irvine, California, served as the drag strip in episode 2, 4, 5, and the championship in episode 7. Greenville, South Carolina, was the filming location for episode 3 and 6.
