= Intelligence (British TV series) =

British TV show

- Poster
- Genre: Comedy
- Created by: Nick Mohammed
- Written by: Nick Mohammed
- Directed by: Matt Lipsey
- Starring: David Schwimmer; Nick Mohammed; Jane Stanness; Sylvestra Le Touzel; Gana Bayarsaikhan; Eliot Salt; Oliver Birch
- Country of origin: United Kingdom
- Original language: English
- No. of series: 2
- No. of episodes: 13

Production
- Executive producers: Nerys Evans; Morwenna Gordon
- Producer: Charlie Leech
- Editor: Gavin Buckley
- Camera setup: Single-camera
- Running time: 20–22 minutes
- Production company: Expectation Entertainment

Original release
- Network: Sky One (series 1–2); Sky Comedy (special)
- Release: 21 February 2020 – 8 April 2023

Intelligence is a British comedy television series created by Nick Mohammed and starring Mohammed and David Schwimmer. It premiered on 21 February 2020 on Sky One. That same month, it was renewed for a second series which premiered on 8 June 2021. A one-hour special was announced in April 2023, titled "Intelligence: A Special Agent Special", that sees Jerry and Joseph fight off a rival operative trying to take down their business and destroy them. The special premiered on 8 April 2023 on Sky Comedy.

== Plot ==
An NSA agent (David Schwimmer) is assigned to act as liaison to the cyber crimes unit in the UK's Government Communications Headquarters, quickly antagonising the unit's chief with his brash style and tendency to try to take over.

== Cast and characters ==
=== Main ===
- David Schwimmer as Jerry Bernstein
- Nick Mohammed as Joseph Harries
- Jane Stanness as Mary
- Sylvestra Le Touzel as Christine Cranfield
- Gana Bayarsaikhan as Tuva Olsen
- Eliot Salt as Evelyn
- Oliver Birch as Quentin O'Higgins

=== Recurring ===
- Lucy Ware as Uma
- Colin Salmon as Rupert Fleming
- Joey Slotnick as Clint

=== Guest ===
- Al Roberts as Pavarotti

== Episodes ==
Series	Episodes	Originally released		
Series	Episodes	First released	Last released	Network
1	6	21 February 2020	6 March 2020	Sky One
2	6	8 June 2021	22 June 2021	Sky One
Special		8 April 2023		Sky Comedy

=== Series 1 (2020) ===
No. overall	No. in season	Title	Directed by	Written by	Original release date
1	1	Episode 1	Matt Lipsey	Nick Mohammed	21 February 2020
2	2	Episode 2	Matt Lipsey	Nick Mohammed	21 February 2020
3	3	Episode 3	Matt Lipsey	Nick Mohammed	28 February 2020
4	4	Episode 4	Matt Lipsey	Nick Mohammed	28 February 2020
5	5	Episode 5	Matt Lipsey	Nick Mohammed	6 March 2020
6	6	Episode 6	Matt Lipsey	Nick Mohammed	6 March 2020

=== Series 2 (2021) ===
No. overall	No. in season	Title	Directed by	Written by	Original release date
7	1	Episode 1	Matt Lipsey	Nick Mohammed	8 June 2021
8	2	Episode 2	Matt Lipsey	Nick Mohammed	8 June 2021
9	3	Episode 3	Matt Lipsey	Nick Mohammed	15 June 2021
10	4	Episode 4	Matt Lipsey	Nick Mohammed	15 June 2021
11	5	Episode 5	Matt Lipsey	Nick Mohammed	22 June 2021
12	6	Episode 6	Matt Lipsey	Nick Mohammed	22 June 2021

=== Special (2023) ===
No. overall	No. in season	Title	Directed by	Written by	Original release date
13	–	Intelligence: A Special Agent Special	Matt Lipsey	Nick Mohammed	8 April 2023

== Filming ==
The show was filmed at Twickenham Studios, with it doubling as GCHQ Cheltenham. In the third episode of the second series, Joseph and Charlotte's 'dinner date' was filmed at St Margarets Tavern. Charlotte's character works at one of the other GCHQ branches; Bude.

The first season was filmed in late 2019 and released in early 2020. The second season was filmed in late 2020 and released in mid 2021.

== Release ==
The series aired in the United Kingdom on Sky One. It was also viewable through Sky's Now platform.

It was broadcast in Australia on ABC Comedy as well as the network's iView platform, and on Peacock in the United States.

In Canada, the series premiered on Showcase, on 13 September 2020. This was followed by Latin America through Warner on 4 November 2020. Spanish pay TV network Cosmo premiered the show on 15 January 2021.
