= Scott Weintrob =

American director

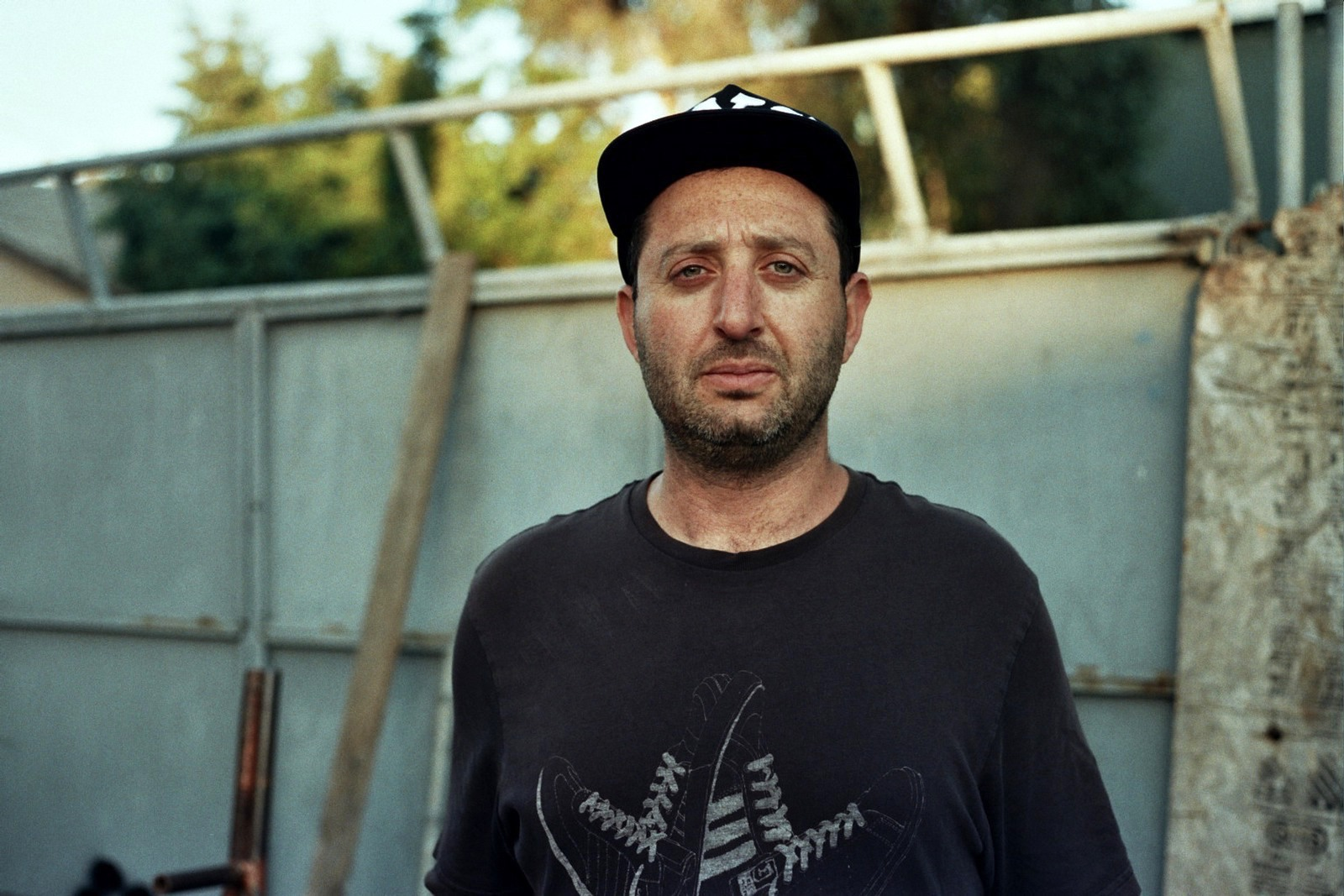
- Occupation: Film Director

Scott Weintrob is a film, and commercials director based in Los Angeles, California. He is the founder of "Studio Large Eyes" a creative studio with recent clients Lewis Hamilton, Rihanna, Offset, Cardi B, and Lil Yachty. Weintrob recently directed Mr. T: I Pity The Fool for Netflix, and completed the highly viral Lewis Hamilton x Ferris Bueller's Day Off with Lewis Hamilton and Edward Norton.

He directed the feature film Paradox Effect, starring Olga Kurylenko and Harvey Keitel. The film premiered at The Rome Film Festival.

Weintrob has been working with brands such as Apple, Netflix, Amazon Studios, Pepsi and more. His work is a blend of storytelling and the embodiment of authentic street culture.

Weintrob created To The Edge for Orlando Bloom. The series released on Peacock.

He wrote and designed creative for Rihanna’s Emmy winning Savage x Fenty show debuting on Amazon. Collaborating with Rihanna and many top talent across fashion, music and film including Cindy Crawford, Emily Ratajkowski, Gigi Hadid, Irina Shayk and Adriana Lima.

Weintrob directed episodes for the Emmy nominated documentary series Home on Apple+.

The global hit series Fastest Car was created, and directed by Weintrob for Netflix.

Weintrob has directed global commercial campaigns for brands including Audi, Cadillac, Volvo and Corvette to name a few.

He has received awards including the Cannes Lion.

== Early years ==
Weintrob's formative years were spent as a photographer's assistant at the famous East London Click Studios where he assisted fashion photographers Jean-Baptiste Mondino, Albert Watson, Rankin and David Simms for magazines including Vogue, and Dazed and Confused.

== Filmography ==
Year	Title	Credited as	Notes
2026	Mr. T: I Pity The Fool	Director	Documentary
2025	Lewis Hamilton: Ferris Bueller's Day Off	Director	Viral Film
2024	Orlando Bloom: To The Edge	Creator	Documentary Series
2023	Paradox Effect	Director	Feature Film
2021	Savage x Fenty Vol.3	Director	Documentary
2020	Home	Director	Documentary
2019	SKRRT with Offset	Creator, Executive Producer, Director	Documentary
2018	Fastest Car	Creator, Executive Producer, Director	Documentary
2016	Two Legged Rat Bastards	Director	Short Film
