= Robert Farrior =

American actor and producer (born 1969)

- Born: Tampa, Florida
- Education: University of Virginia, Columbia University
- Occupations: Actor, producer, psychotherapist

Robert Farrior is an American actor, producer, and psychotherapist.

== Early life and education ==
Born in Tampa, Florida, Farrior graduated from the McIntire School of Commerce at the University of Virginia. He also earned EdM and MA degrees from Columbia University.

== Career ==
As an actor, Farrior has appeared in over 50 film and television shows including American Made with Tom Cruise, where he played "Lt Col Oliver North".

As a producer, Farrior produced An Evening With Beverly Luff Linn starring Aubrey Plaza, Jemaine Clement, Emile Hirsch, and Craig Robinson. The film premiered at the 2018 Sundance Film Festival. Farrior produced the documentary The Story Of Darrel Royal, hosted by Matthew McConaughey. He has also produced numerous stage plays.

== Filmography ==
=== Film ===
Year	Title	Role	Notes
2003	Charmed Soul Survivor (TV Episode 2003)	Ryan	TV series
2003–2008	Las Vegas (TV series)	Grant Potter.	TV series
2007	Cold Case	Adam Murdoch	TV series
2009	Tenure	Dave Bundy	Comedy/Drama
2009	White Collar (TV series)	Robert Barrow	TV series
2017	American Made	Oliver North	Action/Crime
2017	Mindhunter	Warren Freeman	TV series
2023	Law & Order: Special Victims Unit	Peter Parish	TV series
2024	Babygirl	Brack, Stephen	Thriller film
2024	Rob Peace	Tom Rivers	Drama film
2024	Law & Order	Callum Berkshire	Drama film
2025	Stolen Girl	Lewis	

=== Producer ===
Year	Title	Role	Notes
1999	The Story of Darrell Royal	Executive producer	Video
2018	An Evening with Beverly Luff Linn	Executive producer	Crime comedy
