= The Grand (film) =

- Promotional poster
- Directed by: Zak Penn
- Written by: Zak Penn; Matt Bierman
- Produced by: Jeff Bowler
- Starring: Woody Harrelson; Cheryl Hines; David Cross; Chris Parnell; Richard Kind; Dennis Farina; Werner Herzog; Ray Romano
- Cinematography: Anthony Hardwick
- Edited by: Abby Schwarzwalder
- Music by: Stephen Endelman
- Distributed by: Anchor Bay Entertainment
- Release dates: June 7, 2007 (CineVegas International Film Festival); March 21, 2008 (United States)
- Country: United States
- Language: English
- Budget: $3 million
- Box office: $114,669 (USA)

The Grand is a 2007 improv comedy film directed by Zak Penn. The film has an ensemble cast including Ray Romano, Woody Harrelson, Chris Parnell, Werner Herzog, Jason Alexander, Dennis Farina, David Cross, Gabe Kaplan, Michael Karnow and Cheryl Hines along with several real Las Vegas poker stars.

According to Penn, the film is styled after those of Christopher Guest, in which each actor is given direction concerning their character and the actors are left to improvise each individual scene. The plot of The Grand was somewhat more open-ended than Guest's work, however. The focus of the film is a poker tournament played at the Golden Nugget in Las Vegas between the characters in which real poker matches were played by the actors as the scenes were filmed. The film's script did not specify the winner of the tournament, and the ending of the film was determined by the actual game played on set.

The film debuted at the Tribeca Film Festival, and was distributed by Anchor Bay Entertainment. The film opened in limited release in the United States on March 21, 2008, and opened in wider release on April 4, 2008.

== Plot ==
Jack Faro is a recovering drug addict who, after many relapses, decides to move into a rehabilitation facility full-time. Having been married 75 times, he is a serial husband and is always on the lookout for number 76. He enters The Grand, a Texas Hold 'Em poker tournament in Las Vegas created by his grandfather Lucky Faro. His main motivation is to win the $10 million prize to cover a loan he got to keep open his family's casino, The Rabbit's Foot, which his grandfather left him when he died and that he has mismanaged since.

The rest of the players "won" their seats in an online poker tournament. They include the Schwartzman twins, Larry and Lainie, who have been forced into a sibling rivalry throughout their lives by their father, Seth. Another player, Harold Melvin, is a genius who still lives with his mother. Other players include Andy Andrews, a math teacher; Deuce Fairbanks, a wily old veteran of Vegas, and "The German", a cheater who ritualistically sacrifices small animals to gain luck at cards.

== Cast ==
- Woody Harrelson as "One Eyed" Jack Faro - The Sentimental Favorite
- Cheryl Hines as Lainie Schwartzman - The Woman
- David Cross as Larry Schwartzman - The Bad Boy
- Richard Kind as Andy Andrews - The Unknown
- Chris Parnell as Harold Melvin - The Lonely Genius
- Dennis Farina as Deuce Fairbanks - The Old Timer
- Werner Herzog as The German
- Ray Romano as Fred Marsh
- Barry Corbin as Jiminy "Lucky" Faro
- Michael McKean as Steve Lavisch
- Gabe Kaplan as Seth Schwartzman
- Andrea Savage as Renee Jensen
- Estelle Harris as Ruth Melvin
- Judy Greer as Sharon Andrews
- Jason Alexander as Yakov Achmed
- Brett Ratner as Barry Blausteen - Sob Story
- Hank Azaria as Mike Neslo - The Bike
- Tom Hodges as Tim Woolrich - Tiny Wonder
- Shannon Elizabeth as Toni
- K.D. Aubert as Julie - The Waitress
- Mike Epps as Reggie Marshall
- Jeff Bowler as Poker Player
- Tom Lister Jr. as German's Bodyguard

Pro Poker player cameos

- Phil Gordon
- Doyle Brunson
- Daniel Negreanu
- Phil Laak
- Phil Hellmuth
- Antonio Esfandiari
- Richard Brodie

== Critical reception ==
The film received mixed reviews from critics. On review aggregator Rotten Tomatoes, the film holds an approval rating of 40% based on 43 reviews, with an average rating of 5.2/10. The website's critics consensus reads: "The Grand has moments of comic ingenuity, but the jokes in this poker satire often miss." Metacritic reported the film had an average score of 57 out of 100, based on 23 reviews, indicating "mixed or average reviews".

== See also ==
- List of films set in Las Vegas
