= Lamborghini: The Man Behind the Legend =

2022 film by Robert Moresco

- Theatrical release poster
- Directed by: Robert Moresco
- Screenplay by: Robert Moresco
- Based on: Ferruccio Lamborghini. La storia ufficiale by Tonino Lamborghini
- Produced by: Danielle Maloni; Allen Dam; Andrea Iervolino; Monika Bacardi
- Starring: Frank Grillo; Romano Reggiani; Matteo Leoni; Hannah van der Westhuysen; Giovanni Antonacci; Mira Sorvino; Gabriel Byrne
- Cinematography: Gian Filippo Corticelli; Blasco Giurato
- Edited by: Kayla M. Emter
- Music by: Tuomas Kantelinen
- Production companies: Lambofilm; Zian Films; Grindstone Entertainment Group; Iervolino & Lady Bacardi Entertainment
- Distributed by: Lionsgate
- Release date: November 18, 2022
- Running time: 97 minutes
- Country: United States
- Language: English
- Box office: $1.7 million

Lamborghini: The Man Behind the Legend is a 2022 American biographical drama film written and directed by Robert Moresco and starring Frank Grillo as Italian entrepreneur Ferruccio Lamborghini. It was released in select theaters in the United States on November 18, 2022 by Lionsgate, and was panned by critics.

== Plot ==
Ferruccio and his friend, Matteo, return to their hometown of Cento, Italy, after the end of the Second World War serving in the Italian Army. Ferruccio reunites with his girlfriend, Clelia Monti, and returns to his family's farm in the countryside. Ferruccio tells his father, Antonio Lamborghini, that he plans to move to the city where he can start a small automobile company to make affordable farm tractors, but Antonio has doubts about Ferruccio's plan due to their poor upbringing in the competitive market. Ferruccio proposes to Clelia, which she accepts. About six months later, during the Taraday Motor Race, Ferruccio challenges the famed Italian racing driver, Enzo Ferrari, but he and Matteo lose after arguing amongst themselves, unwilling to risk their lives to beat Ferrari and crash into a light pole.

Ferruccio is facing financial difficulties because he lacks sufficient funds to launch his tractor business. He asks his father to loan him some money, but they don't have enough to pay it all. So, Antonio offers to give the land to his son to keep his business flowing. Clelia disapproves of this since Antonio won't take it back. Ferruccio signs the papers under his name and gives them to the bank manager to start his company: the Lamborghini Trattori. Ferruccio and his newly hired team of mechanics developed a smaller hybrid fuel engine. However, the amount of time it took to work on the new engine held Ferruccio with work that his pregnant wife went into labor. He rushes over to see Clelia, but she died during childbirth after giving birth to his son.

After his wife's funeral, Ferruccio proposes the new tractor design to the bank manager, who accepts the new plan. Ferruccio and Matteo celebrate their latest deal, and Matteo takes him to help him impress a woman named Annita. However, Annita has a romantic interest in Ferruccio, who returns her feelings. This causes a rift between him and Matteo, and Matteo leaves the company.

Years later, in 1963, Ferruccio and Annita are married and successfully run the new car company: the Automobili Lamborghini; however, he has a strained relationship with his son, Tonino Lamborghini. One day, a New Zealand racing driver, Bob Wallace, comes to seek a job in his company. After being insulted by Ferrari, Ferruccio, inspired by his son's description of a bullfighter during a visit to an art gallery, hires former Ferrari employee, Giotto Bizzarrini, and Maserati engineer, Giampaolo Dallara, to come up with a car concept of a super-fast racing car that will compete against Ferrari's.

A year later, to that end, they created the famous Lamborghini 350 GT, and presented it at the Geneva International Motor Show, which became a huge success. However, Enzo, humiliated by Ferruccio, privately challenges him to a race. One night, Enzo and Ferruccio race, but Ferruccio ultimately loses to Ferrari's newer car: the Ferrari 500 Superfast. Despite that, Ferrari has a newfound respect for Ferruccio.

Later, Ferruccio, upon learning that his son's family has decided to leave the company after finishing the Lamborghini Miura, decides to leave the company so he can spend time with his family.

== Cast ==
- Frank Grillo as Ferruccio Lamborghini
  - Romano Reggiani as Young Ferruccio Lamborghini
- Gabriel Byrne as Enzo Ferrari
- Mira Sorvino as Annita
- Matteo Leoni as Matteo
- Hannah van der Westhuysen as Clelia Monti
- Francesca Tizzano as Gabriella
- Francesca De Martini as Evelina Lamborghini
- Giulio Mezza as Edmondo Lamborghini
- Giovanni Scotti as Silvio Lamborghini
- Fortunato Cerlino as Antonio Lamborghini
- Giorgio Cantarini as Giorgio Lamborghini
- Eliana Jones as Billie Alland
- Gian Franco Tordi as Radio Reporter
- Giovanni Antonacci as young Tony Renis
- Patrick Brennan as Bob Wallace

== Production ==
On December 29, 2015, it was announced that Ambi Media Group was developing a feature film based on the life of Italian automaker Ferruccio Lamborghini. The company planned to handle worldwide sales rights of the film through their Ambi Distribution arm. On May 11, 2017, it was reported that Michael Radford would direct the film from a script by Robert Moresco based on Tonino Lamborghini's biography about his father entitled Ferruccio Lamborghini. La storia ufficiale. On March 9, 2018, it was announced that Radford had stepped down as director due to scheduling conflicts, and had been replaced by Moresco himself. On May 14, 2018, it was reported that the film would be co-financed and co-produced by TaTaTu, a newly-launched blockchain-based social entertainment platform.

It was also confirmed that Antonio Banderas and Alec Baldwin had been cast as Lamborghini as an adult and Enzo Ferrari, respectively, with Italian actor Romano Reggiani playing young Lamborghini. Principal photography was reportedly set to begin on April 9, 2018, in Rome and Cento, Italy. In September 2021, Frank Grillo announced that he had replaced Banderas in the film. He also noted that Baldwin had dropped out of the film, though his replacement had not yet been announced. Later that month, production began in Rome and Emilia-Romagna, with Gabriel Byrne, Mira Sorvino, Romano Reggiani, Fortunato Cerlino, and Giorgio Cantarini joining the cast. In October 2021, Eliana Jones was announced as a cast member.

== Reception ==
On Rotten Tomatoes, the film holds a rating of 6% based on 16 reviews, with an average of 3.7/10. Mira Sorvino was nominated for Worst Supporting Actress for her performance at the 43rd Golden Raspberry Awards.
