= Francesco Cinquemani =

Italian screenwriter, director and journalist (1978–2024)

- Born: 26 May 1978; Rome, Italy
- Died: 12 December 2024 (aged 46); Rome, Italy
- Occupations: Director; screenwriter; journalist; author

Francesco Cinquemani (26 May 1978 – 12 December 2024) was an Italian screenwriter, director and journalist.

== Life and career ==
Cinquemani was born in Rome on 26 May 1978. He became an author, screenwriter and director after a long career as a journalist and magazine director.

His debut in film was Andron, featuring Alec Baldwin, Leo Howard, Gale Harold, and Danny Glover.

His second film was Beyond the Edge starring Miloš Biković, Antonio Banderas, and Lyubov Aksyonova.

The Poison Rose, co-directed by Cinquemani; starring John Travolta, Morgan Freeman, Famke Janssen, Peter Stormare, Robert Patrick, and Brendan Fraser was released on 24 May 2019, by Lionsgate Premiere.

Cinquemani received the Best Directing International Award at the Terra di Siena Film Festival in 2019.

Cinquemani lived between Rome and Los Angeles. He died in Rome on 12 December 2024, at the age of 46.

== Filmography ==
- Offstage (2014)
- Andron (2015) with Leo Howard, Gale Harold, Alec Baldwin and Danny Glover.
- Beyond the Edge (2018) with Antonio Banderas.
- The Poison Rose (2019) with John Travolta, Brendan Fraser, Famke Janssen, Peter Stormare, Robert Patrick and Morgan Freeman.
- Lockdown Generation (2021)
- Christmas Thieves (Ladri di Natale), (2021) with Michael Madsen and Tom Arnold.
- Muti (2022) with Morgan Freeman.
- Vote for Santa (2022) with Lance Henriksen and Natasha Henstridge.
- The Christmas Witch, (2022) with Tom Arnold and William Baldwin.
- The Ghosts of Monday (2022) with Julian Sands.
- Sherlock Santa (2022) with Tom Arnold and William Baldwin.
- A Day with Santa (2022) with Tom Arnold and William Baldwin.
- Kid Santa (2023) with Alec Baldwin and William Baldwin.
- Billie's Magic World (2023) with Alec Baldwin and William Baldwin.
