= Andrea Iervolino =

Italian film producer

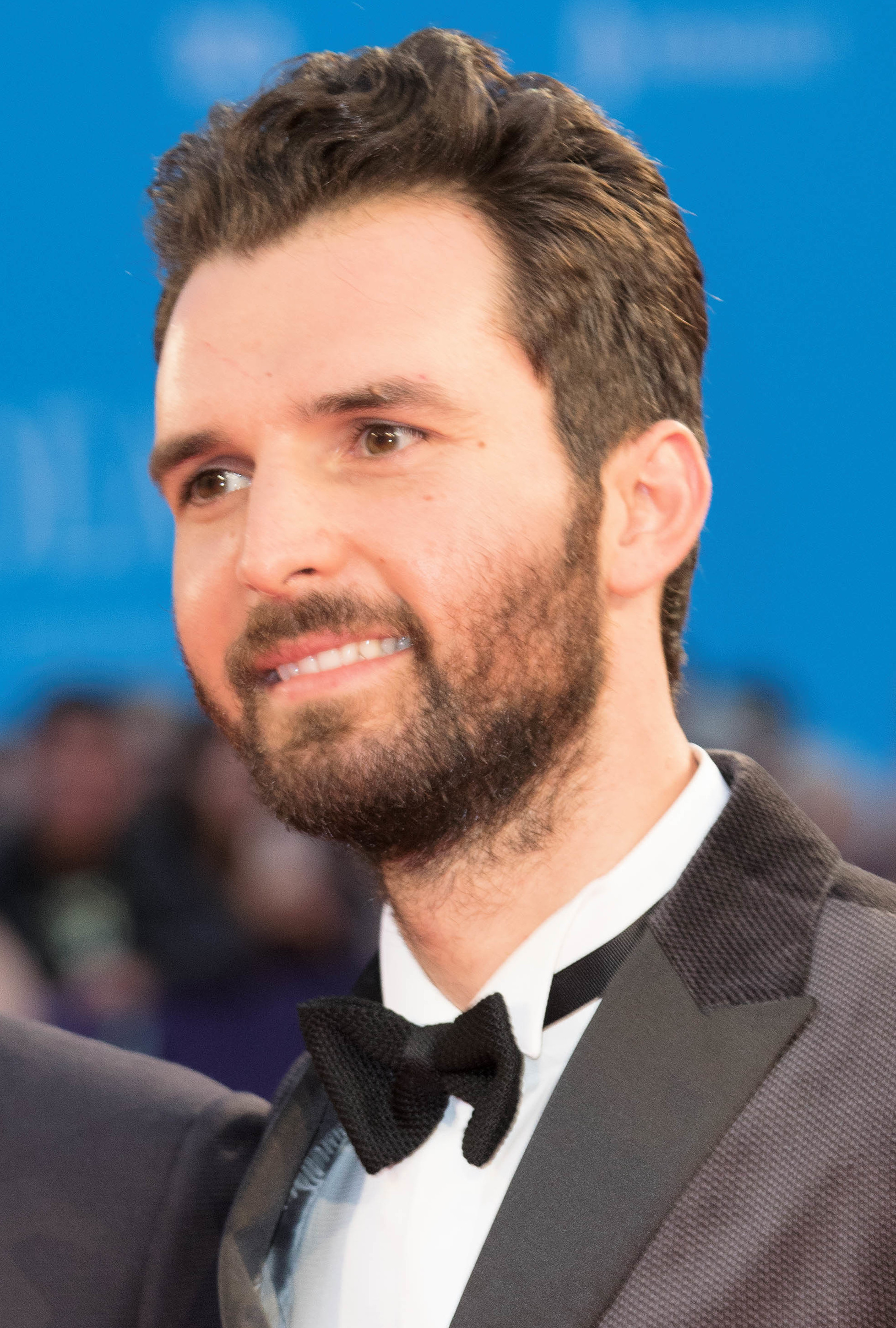
- Iervolino in 2016
- Born: Cassino, Italy
- Occupations: Film producer, entrepreneur, businessman
- Years active: 2002–present

Andrea Iervolino is an Italian–Canadian film producer, entrepreneur, and businessman.

In 2013, Iervolino, along with Monika Bacardi, launched AMBI Media Group, an international consortium of companies encompassing all areas of filmmaking from development to distribution.

== Early life and education ==
Andrea Iervolino was born in Cassino, Italy, in the province of Frosinone. His Canadian-born mother, Sonia, was adopted and moved to Italy at a young age. His father, Giovanni, came from a wealthy Italian family, but his grandfather left the family business in inexperienced hands when he passed. Consequently, the family quickly went bankrupt.

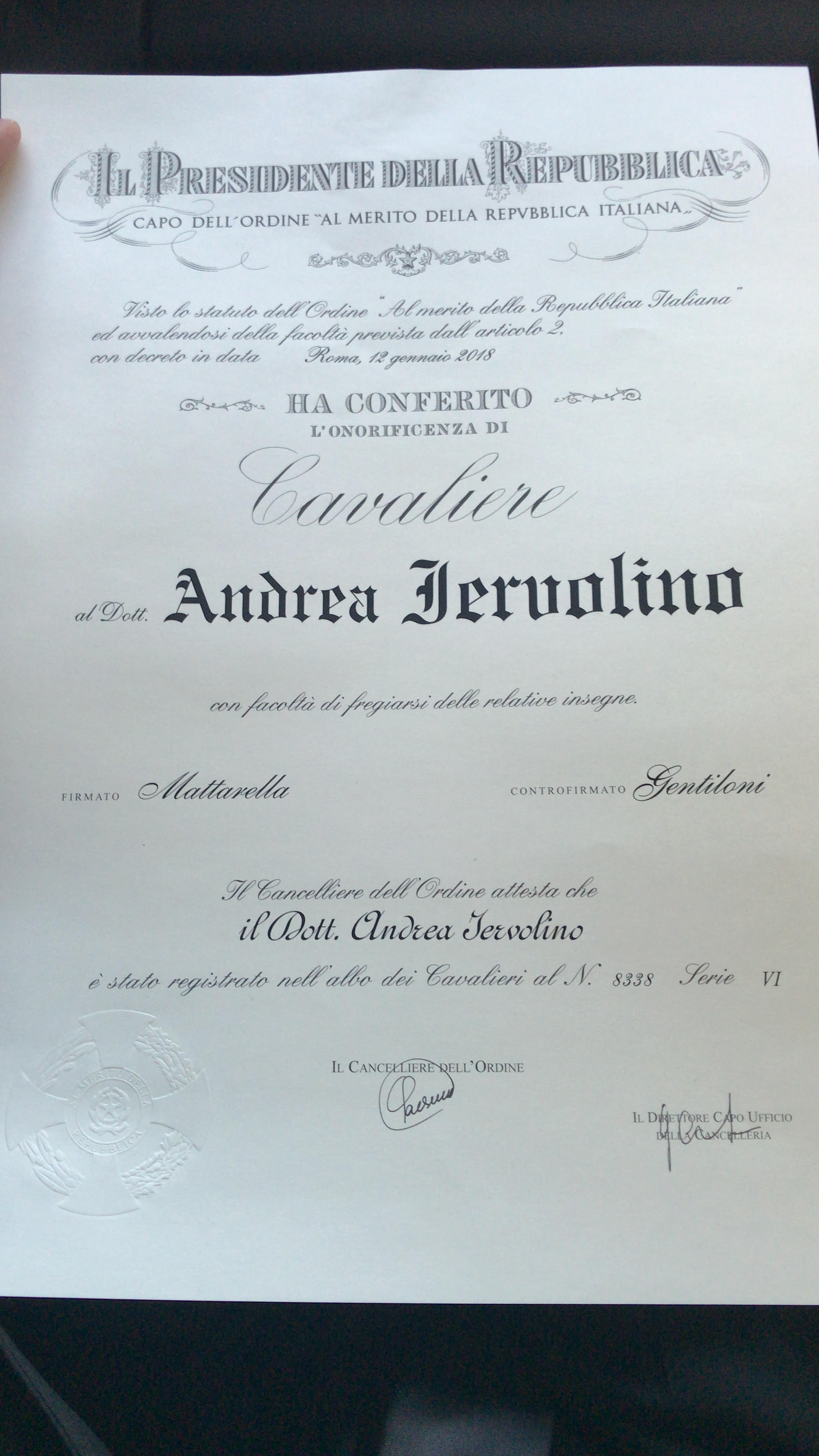

As a child, Iervolino had a stutter and was frequently bullied. Despite his teachers' recommendations, his mother blocked his transfer to a school for disabled children. He believes his stammer was triggered by the shock of his father's descent into alcoholism following the family's financial hardship.

== Career ==
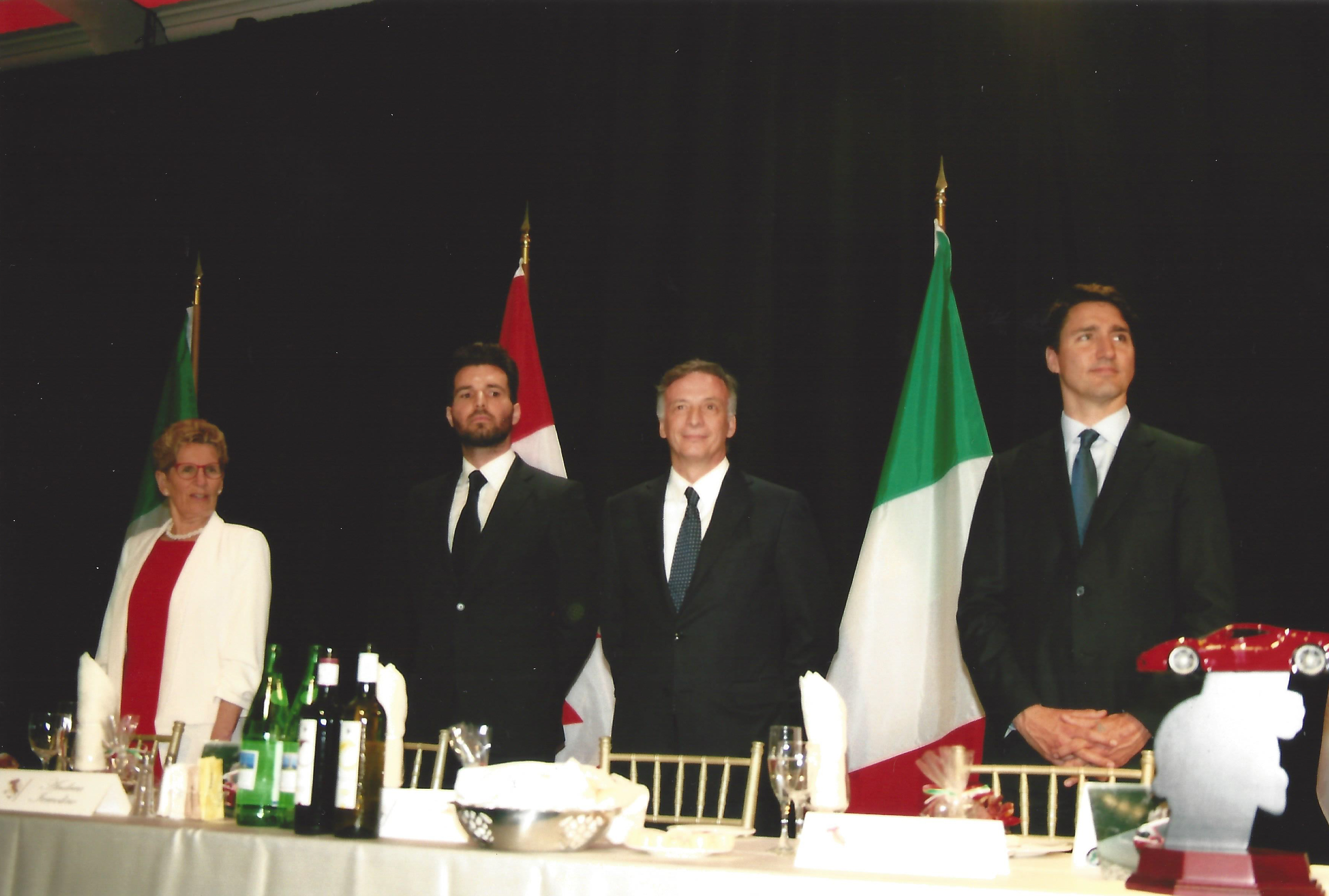
Iervolino at the 2017 Canadian Screen Awards with Kathleen Wynne, Sergio Marchionne and Canadian Prime Minister Justin Trudeau.

At thirteen, Iervolino and his friends launched a small tech business selling websites to local entrepreneurs in Cassino, where it was unusual to use the Internet for advertising. Following this success, Iervolino left home at the age of fifteen to work as a producer's assistant on Broadway-style shows in the resort town of Bibione, Italy.

In September of that year, he returned to his hometown to produce his first film, The Cavalier of Love, financed through crowd-funding from local investors willing to sponsor his project. The film was released in 2003.

In 2014, he made his film-producing debut in the United States as a co-producer of The Humbling, which premiered at the 71st Venice International Film Festival.

Iervolino's film In Dubious Battle was screened at the 2016 Toronto International Film Festival and the 73rd Venice International Film Festival, and his 2019 film Waiting for the Barbarians premiered at the 76th Venice Film Festival.

After failing to distribute it in local cinemas, Iervolino began the Cineschool Day initiative. This strategy involved adding his films into Cassino schools' curricula, giving students the opportunity to watch the films during the daytime at a reduced price. The screenings would then be followed classroom debates. For this purpose, Iervolino put together a library of existing films with strong social themes and proposed them to schools, complete with information brochures and ideas for how the students could debate. The initiative gained enough traction that former Italian Prime Minister and Senator for life Giulio Andreotti attended as spokesperson in 2011 and 2012.

In 2011, he founded the production company Iervolino Entertainment. The company debuted under the Italian Bourse's AIM Italia market in August 2019. The company name changed to Iervolino and Lady Bacardi Entertainment (ILBE) in 2021.

While in Italy, Iervolino met Luciano Martino, who became his mentor and business partner. Together, they co-produced several films, including The Merchant of Venice. After Martino's death in 2013, Monika Bacardi became Iervolino's new partner, establishing the AMBI Media Group.

Following the launch of AMBI Media Group, AMBI Distribution in Beverly Hills and AIC Studios in Toronto were formed. As of 2017, AMBI Media Group also has offices in London, China, and Italy.

In 2015, Iervolino's company acquired 85% of the Exclusive Media Group (EMG) film library in partnership with New York-based private equity firm Raven Capital Management, granting licensing, sequel and remake rights to over 400 features including Begin Again, Cruel Intentions, Donnie Darko, End of Watch, Ides of March, Rush, The Skulls, Snitch, Undefeated, and Memento. These are now listed amongst AMBI Exclusive's library and relicensed around the world.

Also that year, Iervolino and Lady Bacardi created the AMBI Gala Foundation and hosted the first annual AMBI Gala the night prior to TIFF. The proceeds of the gala were given to the Prince Albert II of Monaco Foundation for investing in environmental causes.

In 2017, Iervolino became one of the first film producers to co-produce a film involving the Pope, when Pope Francis appeared as himself in the film Beyond the Sun, which premiered in Vatican City in September 2017.

In 2018, Iervolino launched TaTaTu, an entertainment platform with cryptocurrency rewards for users watching and sharing content. TaTaTu has co-financed and co-produced movies such as Lamborghini: The Man Behind the Legend and Waiting for the Barbarians, which premiered at the 76th Venice International Film Festival. The company also publishes the vodcast Giving Back Generation hosted by Raquelle Stevens and directed by Chiara Tilesi.

In 2020, Iervolino opened Iervolino Studios, a branch of ILBE, in Serbia with actor Miloš Biković. The studio focused on short animated films, including the Johnny Depp-starring web animated series Puffins.

== Other activities and roles ==
In 2016, Iervolino was an ambassador for Italian Cinema of the world for the Italian Contemporary Film Festival (ICFF) and the president of Ischia Global Film & Music Festival.

In April 2021, Iervolino founded SPACE 11, dedicated to producing projects in outer space, partnering with experts from SpaceX. In May of that year, the company announced plans for the series Galactic Combat, involving over 40 martial arts fighters competing in zero gravity, with the finalists competing in a rocket shuttle orbiting Earth. It is expected to air in 2023.

In May 2023, Iervolino purchased a stake in professional football club Miami FC. The USL Championship club is located in Miami, Florida in the 2nd division of US Soccer. The deal values the club at $56 million.

== Recognition and awards ==
Iervolino was named as one of Variety's Dealmakers in 2015, and a "Producer to Watch" in 2016. In 2020, he was named to the Variety 500 list of the global media industry's most influential figures.

In 2017 he received an honoris causa degree in cinematography from Vasile Goldis University. One year later he received another honorary doctorate, this time from the University of Mexico City.

Iervolino was awarded a Knighthood of the Italian Republic (Cavaliere della Repubblica Italiana) on June 18, 2018, by Italian president Sergio Mattarella and the Italian consulate of Canada. This recognition is "the highest ranking honor of the Republic awarded for "merit acquired by the nation" in the fields of literature, the arts, economy, public service, and social, philanthropic and humanitarian activities and for long and conspicuous service in civilian and military careers."

=== Films ===
- Italian Contemporary Film Festival 2016 – Winner of the IC Saving Award for the Best Canadian Film
- Venice Film Festival 2016 – Mimmo Rotella Special Award for the production of "In Dubious Battle"
- Venice Film Festival 2015 – Mimmo Rotella Special Award for the production of "The Humbling"
- Made in Italy Awards 2015 – Nominated for Best Businessman
- Pompeii Cinema Festival 2014 – Winner of the "Fauno danzante" for best foreign production with the film "The Humbling"
- Italian Contemporary Film Festival 2018 – Winner of the Best Producer Award
- Ordine al Merito Della Repubblica Italiana – Awarded as a Knight of the Italian Republic
- Premio Eccellenza Italiana 2020 – Sezione Cinema
- Variety 500 2020

== Selected filmography ==
- The Cavalier of Love (2003)
- The Merchant of Venice (2004)
- L'allenatore nel pallone 2 (2008)
- Outing – Fidanzati per sbaglio
- La mia mamma suona il rock
- Si può fare l'amore vestiti?
- Like the Wind (2013)
- The Humbling (2014)
- All Roads Lead to Rome (2015)
- Septembers of Shiraz (2015)
- Andron (2015)
- In Dubious Battle (2016)
- This Beautiful Fantastic (2016)
- East End (2016)
- Rupture (2016)
- Black Butterfly (2017)
- To the Bone (2017)
- Beyond the Sun (2017)
- In Search of Fellini (2017)
- The Music of Silence (2017)
- Future World (2018)
- Here and Now (2018)
- Bent (2018)
- Beyond the Edge (2018)
- Waiting for the Barbarians (2019)
- The Poison Rose (2019)
- Arctic Dogs (2019)
- Trading Paint (2019)
- Finding Steve McQueen (2019)
- Bernie the Dolphin 2 (2019)
- Lamborghini: The Man Behind the Legend (2022)
- Tell It Like a Woman (2022)
- State of Consciousness (2022)
- Dakota (2022)
- Eddie & Sunny (2022)
- Paradox Effect (2023)
- Ferrari (2023)
- In the Fire (2023)
- The Ritual Killer (2023)
- Le mura di Bergamo (The Walls of Bergamo) (2023)
- Liberato's Secret (2024)
- Modì, Three Days on the Wing of Madness (2024)
- Kill 'Em All 2 (2024)
- Juliet & Romeo (2025)
- Find Your Friends (2025)
- Maserati: The Brothers (2026)
- Bugatti (TBA)
