= Waiting for the Barbarians (film) =

2019 film directed by Ciro Guerra

- Official release poster
- Directed by: Ciro Guerra
- Screenplay by: J. M. Coetzee
- Based on: Waiting for the Barbarians by J. M. Coetzee
- Produced by: Monika Bacardi; Michael Fitzgerald; Andrea Iervolino; Olga Segura
- Starring: Mark Rylance; Johnny Depp; Robert Pattinson; Gana Bayarsaikhan; Greta Scacchi
- Cinematography: Chris Menges
- Edited by: Jacopo Quadri
- Music by: Giampiero Ambrosi
- Production companies: Iervolino Entertainment; AMBI Group
- Distributed by: Samuel Goldwyn Films (United States); Iervolino Entertainment (Italy)
- Release dates: September 6, 2019 (Venice); August 7, 2020 (United States)
- Running time: 112 minutes
- Countries: Italy; United States
- Languages: English; Mongolian
- Box office: $764,815

Waiting for the Barbarians is a 2019 drama film and English-language directorial debut by Ciro Guerra. The film is based on the 1980 novel by J. M. Coetzee. It stars Mark Rylance, Johnny Depp, Robert Pattinson, Gana Bayarsaikhan, and Greta Scacchi.

The film premiered at the Venice Film Festival on September 6, 2019. It was released on August 7, 2020, by Samuel Goldwyn Films. It received a lukewarm critical response.

== Plot ==
The Magistrate manages an outpost on the desert frontiers of an unnamed Empire. His careful management has kept the peace for many years and there are only minor misunderstandings. All that changes with the arrival of Colonel Joll, who is acting as part of a mysterious plan set in motion by the centre of the empire. The Magistrate tries his best, but Colonel Joll remains antagonistic. Colonel Joll insists on interrogating an innocent man and his nephew for sheep rustling. Colonel Joll is determined to follow his process for getting the truth, which requires brutal torture. The Magistrate does not understand Joll, or his methods, or his goals. Colonel Joll then forces the tortured nephew to escort him and a detachment of soldiers to his tribe, where numerous women and elderly men are taken into custody as "prisoners of war".

Colonel Joll departs the next day, prompting the Magistrate to immediately release the prisoners and send them home. A few months later, a former prisoner with two broken ankles is seen panhandling in the streets. The Magistrate gives her food and shelter, and attempts to heal her broken ankles. Some of the soldiers mistake this act of kindness for an act of lust, believing that the Magistrate intends to keep the girl as a concubine. The Magistrate learns of all the tortures and hardships the girl has gone through, including the death of her father. He asks her to stay at the fort, but promises to return her to her people if she does not wish to stay. The girl chooses the latter.

After a long and arduous journey through the desert, the Magistrate approaches the nomads in the mountains hoping to restore relations with them, but the nomads are upset and only the Magistrate's reputation and the knowledge that he helped one of their own keeps the tribesmen from butchering him and his escorts. The Magistrate returns to find Officer Mandel, Colonel Joll's underling, has been assigned to command the fort. Officer Mandel immediately takes the Magistrate into custody, accuses him of treachery, and strips him of his office.

The Magistrate is eventually released, but when he tries to help "prisoners of war" being mistreated by Mandel's soldiers, the soldiers beat and abuse him. He is then brought in for questioning and accused of consorting with the enemy for helping the nomad girl. The Magistrate is publicly shamed and has his home and possessions confiscated, while Colonel Joll departs with a large force to wipe out the mountain nomads. The Magistrate, now disheveled, poor, homeless, and ostracized by his countrymen, is taken in by one of his former servants, who feeds and clothes him.

Colonel Joll's military campaign has resulted in the unification of the dispersed nomadic tribes into a single "barbarian" army. A horse carrying the mutilated corpse of one of Colonel Joll's men walks into the fort. Officer Mandel quickly leaves with some of his men. Those left behind soon decide to flee as well but not before looting, raping and murdering the townpeople. Later Colonel Joll returns with only a handful of survivors. The Magistrate finds him sitting in his coach completely detached from reality. With no supplies or horses, they leave while being pelted by rocks.

The Magistrate walks through the town where boys play-pretend to stand guard next to scarecrows dressed as soldiers at the gates of the fort. While he thinks of the nomad girl living in the desert, a shadow approaches the Magistrate, who is standing alone in the courtyard, and a cloud of dust appears on the horizon thrown up by an immense army of nomadic warriors heading towards the town.

== Cast ==
- Mark Rylance as The Magistrate
- Johnny Depp as Colonel Joll
- Robert Pattinson as Officer Mandel
- Gana Bayarsaikhan as "The Girl"
- Greta Scacchi as Mai
- David Dencik as The Clerk
- Sam Reid as The Lieutenant
- Harry Melling as Garrison Soldier 4
- Bill Milner as Garrison Soldier 5

== Production ==
It was announced in October 2016 that filmmaker Ciro Guerra was working on an adaptation of the novel Waiting for the Barbarians, which would see him make his English language debut. Mark Rylance was announced to star in the film.

In May 2018, Johnny Depp was stated to have contacted Guerra in regard to appearing in the film. Robert Pattinson was revealed as being cast in the film as well. Depp confirmed in October he would star in the film, and revealed filming was to begin at the end of the month in Morocco, later pinpointed as being October 29. Production concluded on December 14, 2018.

== Release ==
Waiting for the Barbarians had its world premiere at the Venice Film Festival on September 6, 2019. Samuel Goldwyn Films acquired U.S. distribution rights to the film, and released it on August 7, 2020.

== Reception ==
=== Box office ===
By May 2022, the film grossed $764,815 in the worldwide box office.

=== Critical response ===
On the review aggregator website Rotten Tomatoes, 54% of 95 critics' reviews are positive, with an average rating of 6.1/10. The website's critics consensus reads: "Admirable in theory but disappointing in execution, Waiting for the Barbarians struggles to turn strong performances and worthy themes into affecting drama." Metacritic, which uses a weighted average, assigned the film a score of 52 out of 100, based on 19 critics, indicating "mixed or average" reviews.
