= Chiara Tilesi =

Italian film maker

Chiara Tilesi is an Italian-American director, screenwriter, activist, and producer of the 2023 film Tell It Like a Woman.

Tilesi moved to the United States when she was eighteen, to attend Loyola Marymount University in Los Angeles, California, where, in 1995 she graduated cum laude in liberal arts. In her early years she wrote a book of poetry entitled Amore amore mio, which earned her the Fiorino D'Oro Award. She produced the Behind the Scenes of the Academy Award winner movie Il Postino, and won Best Story and Narration Award at the International Backstage Festival of Bologna. In 1995, she produced a short film entitled I'm Sophie and You? The film won various awards, and was acquired and broadcast by the Italian national network RAI Television. In 1997, Tilesi returned to Italy to produce the compact disc Nei Tuoi Occhi, as a tribute to Massimo Troisi. The CD, a collection of love poems by the poet Pablo Neruda read by famous Italian artists, eventually enjoyed great commercial success and critical acclaim. In 1998, Tilesi produced the short film entitled Effetto Lunare, (What about the Moon?). 2001 saw her production of the short film Strani Accordi, coproduced and distributed by Universal. The film was released in 100 theaters in Italy. She was the producer of the 2005 the movie All the Invisible Children which premiered at the Venice Film Festival.

She was invited to participate as a Cultural Leader and official speaker to the World Economic Forum Annual Meeting, held in Davos, Switzerland. Tilesi presented her inspirational speech at the Betazone "The Female Icon", on the disruption of the paradigm and how women's narratives can change, joining other industry leaders and cultural figures like WDIT board member Aifaa Al-Mansour, Marin Alsop, Sir David Attenborough, Bono, David Blaine, Karan Johar, Michelle Yeoh, and more in an effort to advance a dialogue discussing how inclusivity and sustainability can be the pillars of change.

Tilesi has also presented speeches at TED X WOMEN, at the UN and Cannes, to name a few, to spread the message of gender equality. Tilesi's first feature film, All the Invisible Children, was produced for UNICEF and the World Food Program, with a release in 120 countries and the co-direction of Ridley Scott, John Woo and Spike Lee, among others.

She was appointed Director of Social Impact Department as well as Director and Creator of ISFF (Impact short Film Festival) of TaTaTu, a blockchain-based social entertainment platform.

In 2011, she produced a documentary film about the life of Franco Califano We, People of September, which was selected for the Rome Film Festival.

Tilesi is a Board of Director member of L-Nutra, the leading nutri-technology company developing an innovative portfolio of Fasting Mimicking Diets FMD', founded by Valter Longo, director of the USC Longevity Institute and The Program on Longevity and Cancer at IFOM in Milan. Tilesi and Longo are co-producers of the documentary The Longevity Revolution.

She is the founder of Globunity, a global cultural event and digital media platform that focuses on creativity and arts.

She holds the position of Event Vice Chair of Rock the Kasbah – a non-profit foundation of Sir Richard Branson's Virgin Group, a member of the UNICEF Chinese Children's Initiative Advisory board, and on the board of directors for Children Mending Hearts, a nonprofit organization. Tilesi was named an Ambassador for the 2019 edition of Monaco Better World Forum (MBWF) by MBWF's founder and president Manuel Collas de La Roche.

On June 14, 2024, the collective book Guarda come una donna was published, with Tilesi contributing an essay. The book, published by Armando Editore, features a collection of diverse stories from women across different fields. It was presented at the European Parliament, and several universities have adopted it as a textbook.

In 2024, Tilesi also conceived the I AM campaign, a powerful social initiative involving women from the entertainment industry and beyond. The campaign aims to challenge and redefine the image of women perpetuated by the media. It was first showcased in September 2024 at the NASDAQ Tower in Times Square, New York, and is set to travel globally, with stops planned all over the world. With each location, the campaign will feature new faces and affirmations, continuing to inspire change and empowerment.

== Tell It Like A Woman ==
Tilesi was a producer of the film Tell It Like a Woman, which garnered a 2023 Academy Award nomination for Best Original Song. The film consists of seven segments directed by a diverse and internationally renowned group of women filmmakers, including Margherita Buy, Cara Delevingne, Jacqueline Fernandez, Marcia Gay Harden, Jennifer Hudson, Eva Longoria, Pauletta Washington, and Anne Watanabe. Tilesi also served as the music video producer for the film's theme song, "Applause"; written by Diane Warren and performed by Sofia Carson, the song celebrates women's empowerment. In June 2022, the film premiered at the Taormina Film Festival where it won the TFF Excellence Award.

In March 2023, Tilesi presented WDIT at the UN Nations General Assembly, opening the women's month with a Tell It Like A Woman screening in collaboration with UN Women, the Mission of Italy to the United Nations, and the following governments: USA, UK, Japan, Chile, and Argentina.

On May 9, 2023, Tilesi received the Pegaso Delle Donne Award from Eugenio Giani, President of the Region of Toscana, on the occasion of the special screening of Tell It Like A Woman.

The nonprofit film production company We Do It Together was the engine behind the film Tell It Like A Woman.

== One Of Us ==
On March 8, 2022, International Women's Day, One Of Us season 2 was released in Washington, D.C. The East Coast episode of the limited series that Tilesi directed was premiered at the Italian Embassy in Washington, D.C. in the presence of Speaker Nancy Pelosi and the Ukrainian Ambassador to Washington, Oksana Markarova. Talent Included Isabella Rossellini, Ambassador Mariangela Zappia, Natalia Bergamaschi, Cecilia Alemani, Cristina Cassetti. The West Coast episode was premiered two days later at Mr. Brainwash Art Museum in Los Angeles and included the talent Giada De Laurentiis, Raffaella Camera, Federica Raia, and Gabriella Pession. One Of Us season 2 was recognized at the 2022 Los Angeles, Italia, Film, Fashion, and Art Fest where both Tilesi and actress Gabriella Pession took home an LA ITALIA - EXCELLENCE AWARD for their representation of women in film and TV. The series is available to watch on the Embassy of Italy's YouTube Channel and Consulate General YouTube Channel.
