= Jeff Bowler =

American film and television producer

Jeff Bowler (born September 10, 1975 in Gardner, Massachusetts) is an American film and television producer best known for producing films such as The Grand and programs such as Inked.

== Early life ==
Jeffrey (“Jeff”) Bowler was born and raised in Winchendon and Gardner, Massachusetts. He attended University of Hawaii Maui College.

== Career ==
=== Bandai Entertainment ===
At the age of 21, Bowler was a business development executive at Bandai, the world’s third largest toy manufacturer and owner of the Mighty Morphin Power Rangers.

=== World Wrestling Entertainment ===
After Bandai, Bowler went to work for the World Wrestling Federation (WWF), now World Wrestling Entertainment (WWE), where he was Vice President of Business Development.

=== Foglight Entertainment ===
Mr. Bowler founded Foglight Entertainment, based in Los Angeles and New York, in 2002. Bill MacDonald joined Foglight in 2003. Bowler and MacDonald produced and developed an MTV original movie about the founder of Napster, Shawn Fanning. They also developed and produced TV series with a number of networks and partners such as MTV, CMT, NBC, ESPN, E!, and others.

=== Jeff Bowler Productions ===
From 2004 until 2010, Bowler was an indie film producer for his own company, Jeff Bowler Productions. During this time, Bowler produced a thriller, “Across the Hall,” with Brittany Murphy and “The Grand” with Woody Harrelson. He also produced a 3-D animated film called Sky Force with Lionsgate Films.

=== Typhoon Entertainment ===
Jeff Bowler founded Typhoon Entertainment with partner Bill MacDonald. In 2004, Fox TV Studies signed a first-look production deal with Typhoon. At Typhoon, Bowler was the executive producer of the bio series “Driven” for VH1. Also for VH1, Typhoon set up the reality TV series “I’m in the…”.

=== The Exchange ===
==== Film ====
Bowler is one of the executive producers of the documentary “Unchained: The Untold Story of Freestyle Motocross.” Josh Brolin narrates the film.

In March 2014, Bowler and The Exchange’s CEO, Brian O’Shea, announced a deal with former William Morris agent Graham Kaye and Lake Forest Entertainment’s Elliot Michael Smith to work on a biopic about Steve McQueen. The film will be partially based on the 2010 biography written by Marshall Terrill entitled, “Steve McQueen: The Life and Legend of a Hollywood Icon”. Bowler will serve as a producer and financier for the film.

The Exchange announced, in May 2014, a deal to produce, package and sell a big budget reboot of Kickboxer, the classic 1989 action film. Jeff Bowler and Brian O’Shea are executive producers for the film, and martial artist and stunt man Alain Moussi will debut as the leading actor.

In May 2015, it was announced that a second Three Stooges film was in development, a sequel to the 2012 movie from 20th Century Fox. Bowler, along with O’Shea, are amongst the producers.

==== Television ====
In January 2015, the US cable network Reelz purchased 104 episodes of Celebrated from Bowler and The Exchange. Celebrated is a half-hour weekday show profiling celebrities such as Halle Berry, Angelina Jolie, Russell Crowe and others, produced by Reboot TV. The program was the first deal made by Bowler & O’Shea since launching the company’s TV development division. Bowler is an executive producer on the series.

=== Storyboard Media ===
In 2016, Jeff Bowler accepted an offer to become the CEO of Storyboard Media, a film and TV production, finance, and global sales company.

== Personal life ==
Jeff Bowler lives in the greater Los Angeles area. Jeff has four children whom he has been raising on his own since his early 20s.
