= 007: Quantum of Solace =

2008 first-person shooter video game

- North American Xbox 360 cover art
- Developers: Treyarch (PC, PS3, Wii, X360) (Note: Ported to PC and Wii by Beenox); Eurocom (PS2); Vicarious Visions (DS)
- Publisher: Activision
- Composer: Christopher Lennertz
- Series: James Bond
- Engine: IW 3.0; EngineX (PlayStation 2)
- Platforms: Nintendo DS; PlayStation 2 PlayStation 3 Wii; Windows; Xbox 360
- Release: EU: 31 October 2008; NA: 4 November 2008; AU: 19 November 2008
- Genres: First-person shooter Third-person shooter (DS/PS2)
- Modes: Single-player, multiplayer

007: Quantum of Solace is a 2008 shooter video game published by Activision. Based on the James Bond films Casino Royale (2006) and Quantum of Solace (2008), it was developed by Treyarch for PlayStation 3 (PS3) and Xbox 360 and by Beenox for Microsoft Windows and Wii, and is mostly played as a first-person shooter, with occasional switches to third-person. Eurocom developed a similar version for the PlayStation 2, played solely as a third-person shooter, while Vicarious Visions developed an entirely different version for the Nintendo DS, which is also played from a third-person perspective.

Quantum of Solace marked Activision's first James Bond video game, following a deal the company reached in 2006 to acquire the game rights, previously held by Electronic Arts. The developers referred to previous Bond games, with the acclaimed GoldenEye 007 providing the biggest source of inspiration. They also visited the sets of Casino Royale and Quantum of Solace and incorporated the likeness and voice work of numerous cast members, including Bond actor Daniel Craig, marking his debut in a Bond video game. Other returning cast members included Judi Dench, Eva Green, Mads Mikkelsen, Olga Kurylenko, and Mathieu Amalric.

Quantum of Solace, according to Metacritic, received "mixed or average reviews" across all platforms. Critics generally believed that the game failed to live up to the standards set by GoldenEye due to its repetitive gameplay and short length, although they praised the multiplayer options, voice acting and music.

== Plot ==
The game begins with MI6 agent James Bond kidnapping Mr. White, a member of the previously unknown criminal-terrorist organization Quantum. While he and M interrogate White, they are attacked by the traitorous MI6 agent Craig Mitchell, who is killed by Bond while White escapes. Later, Bond spies on a meeting of Quantum members discussing a project called Tierra at the Bregenz Opera House and photographs them; among them is Dominic Greene, the CEO of Greene Planet and a well-known environmentalist.

The game jumps forward to Bond crash landing in Bolivia, where Greene Planet's Project: Tierra was revealed: create artificial dams to block and holding water in a makeshift resovar to prevent it going to Bolivia. By this time, Bond has met Camille Montes, who is seeking vengeance against General Medrano, who is trying to overthrow the Bolivian government. Bond learns that Medrano killed Camille's family, and this is why she wants revenge. Bond opens up to Camille about the death of his former lover Vesper Lynd, recounting his experience during the events of Casino Royale: chasing Mollaka through Madagascar, infiltrating the Miami Science Center to kill Dimitrios, saving Skyfleet from Carlos at Miami International Airport, killing Bliss en route to Montenegro, meeting Vesper, saving Le Chiffre from Steven Obanno and his men at the Casino, saving Vesper from Le Chiffre, and finally confronting Vesper and Gettler in Venice where Vesper dies, at which point the game flashes back to the present.

Bond and Camille soon arrive at the Perla de la Dunas (Pearl of the Dunes) eco hotel in the middle of the Bolivian desert. There, Greene and Medrano are discussing the land that Greene and Quantum wanted to buy. Greene and Quantum would fund Medrano's attempt to overthrow the government in exchange for the land and 86% of its natural resources that he and Quantum wanted to acquire to finish project Tierra. Bond and Camille infiltrated the hotel and broke up the meeting. Camille killed Medrano as revenge for her family, while Bond kills Greene. During the fight, the hotel's hydrogen fuel cells are ignited. Bond and Camille manage to escape from the hotel before it explodes. With the Teirra project shut down, they leave the area in an MI6 helicopter. In the closing scene, it is revealed that Mr. White and Guy Haines are reviewing MI6 debriefings and updates on 007's missions. The game ends with a scene of Bond outside the house telling M that he is going in.

In the PS3 version, in a post credits scene, Bond contacted Tanner and informs him that the $150 million Casino Royal winnings were not found in White's estate and were still missing.

== Gameplay ==
Quantum of Solace is played as a shooter game across all platforms, with players taking on the role of James Bond in each version.

=== Home console and PC version ===
The PC, PS3, Wii, and Xbox 360 versions are primarily a first-person shooter, but perspective switches to third-person whenever Bond takes cover from enemy fire. The PS2 version is played solely from a third-person perspective. Health is automatically regenerated when not taking damage.

The player can hold up to three weapons and can pick up fallen weapons left behind by dead enemies. The player is also given a map of each level and can use hacking to unlock doors and disable security cameras. Stealth can be used and is sometimes necessary to proceed. Examples of this include the use of silenced weapons and silent takedowns of enemy guards. Fights occasionally incorporate quick time events, requiring the player to press the correct button as prompted on-screen.

The various versions are generally the same, though with minor changes to suit the technological capabilities of each platform. The PS2 version excludes the missions set at the Miami airport, on the train, and in Venice. It adds a new mission set in the docks, and all levels feature slightly different designs. The Wii version features controls tailored towards its Wii Remote motion controller, and it supports the Wii Zapper accessory.

=== DS version ===
The DS game is viewed from a third-person isometric perspective, but switches to an over-the-shoulder view during melee attacks. Gameplay is mostly controlled with the console's touchscreen, which is used to guide Bond around, as well as to aim and shoot at enemies. Bond can jump at predetermined sections in the game.

Scattered throughout each level are various items, including casino chips and cards, which can be used to upgrade abilities. Cards can be equipped in different orders to enhance abilities with varying effects, depending on what poker hands are formed. Chips are used to purchase upgrades such as better aiming.

The DS version follows an altered storyline compared with the other games. The character of Camille is cut altogether, the opening mission at White's Estate is replaced by a training simulation at MI6 Headquarters and, after fighting street gangs in Bolivia, the final mission and boss fights against Greene and Mr. White take place at Guy Haines' Mansion.

=== Multiplayer ===
Quantum of Solace, with the exception of the PS2 and DS versions, includes a multiplayer option with several game modes. Players are split between MI6 and Quantum. Online multiplayer is available for up to 4 players on the Wii game, and up to 16 players on the other versions. The Wii version also offers an offline split-screen option for up to 4 players. Points are awarded for each round of multiplayer that is won, and these can be used to purchase new weapons and upgrades.

Multiplayer modes in the PC, PS3, and Xbox 360 versions include:

- Bond Versus: One Bond plays against six other members of the 'Organization'. Bond will win if he defuses two of the three bombs, or else eliminates every member of the Organization. To make the game fairer Bond has two lives, can see all enemies, and can use any weapon set (whereas the members of the Organization have only 3 basic options). The Organization wins if Bond dies twice or if he cannot defuse two bombs in the time limit.
- Team Conflict: Basic Team Deathmatch of MI6 versus the 'Organization'.
- Golden Gun: This is a standard free-for-all conflict, which the main aim is to score 100 points. One point is scored for a kill with normal weapons, or for picking up the Golden Gun, while kills while holding the Golden Gun (or killing the person with it) scores 6. The winner is the first to score 100 points or the highest number of points in the allotted time limit.
- Bond Evasion: There are two teams, MI6 and The Organization. One player from the MI6 team is randomly designated as Bond, and therefore as the VIP. MI6 wins the round if Bond can get to the escape point, or if all of the Organization are eliminated. The Organization wins if Bond is prevented from escaping within the time limit, or if he dies.
- Territory Control: Basic match of one team having to control a point to gain points for their team.
- Classic: Players starts with a GF 18 A (Glock 18). Weapons and explosives are spawned around the level for them to pick up.

The Wii version has fewer multiplayer options:

- Conflict: This is a death-match. Up to four players compete versus each other to score as many kills as possible in a selectable number of minutes.
- Rush: This is a mission death-match. All players (up to four) are against each other and are assigned certain missions to complete in a selectable number of minutes.
- Team Conflict: The goal is to get the most kills for the player team (Organization versus MI-6). The teams can be constructed in any way (3 vs 1, 2 vs 2, 4 vs 0, in a four-player match). There is a time limit of 15 minutes.
- Team Rush: This is a team play game. The goal is to do specific missions before the other team does, all while staying alive. 15 minutes is the time limit.

== Development ==
In May 2006, Activision reached a deal to acquire the publishing rights to James Bond video games. The company reportedly paid $70 million for the licence, which had been held by Electronic Arts since the late 1990s. Activision's deal took effect in September 2007, and Quantum of Solace would mark its first Bond game. Treyarch, a studio owned by Activision, handled development on the PS3 and Xbox 360 versions. Beenox handled the PC and Wii versions, while Eurocom worked on the PS2 version. Vicarious Visions developed the DS game. Quantum of Solace was developed with the IW 3.0 game engine, previously used for Call of Duty 4: Modern Warfare (2007). The existing engine gave Treyarch a head start on development, allowing time for the team to create its own artificial intelligence (AI) and to add new features such as the cover system and takedown moves.

Because the film Quantum of Solace (2008) is a direct sequel to Casino Royale (2006), the decision was made for the former's game adaptation to cover both films. The development team visited the sets of both instalments and observed some filming, while taking reference photos to help recreate the environments for the game adaptation. The developers also received a James Bond bible from the filmmakers, establishing basic rules about the character and his universe. Otherwise, the developers were granted creative freedom wherever it would help to make for better gameplay. In addition to the bible, the developers also had access to the film scripts. The game includes a fight on board a train, a scene that was removed from Casino Royale.

The Treyarch team played previous Bond games, including the acclaimed 1997 instalment GoldenEye 007, which provided the biggest source of inspiration. The game lacks driving levels, a common element in past games, as Treyarch sought to avoid taking on more than it could handle. The company also wanted the game to focus on combat, with driving seen as too much of a departure.

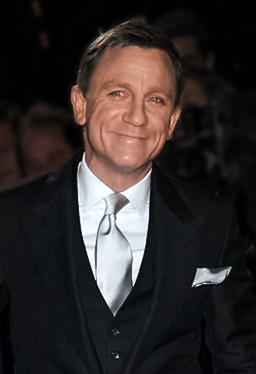
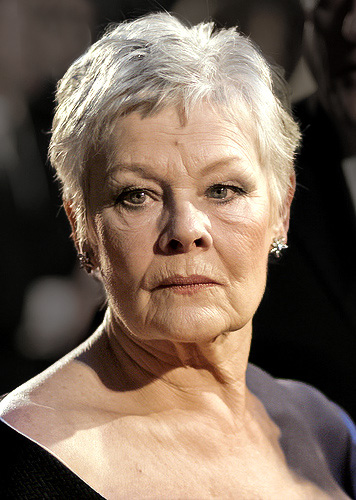
Daniel Craig and Judi Dench were among cast members from the films to reprise their roles in the game.

Quantum of Solace marked the first Bond video game for actor Daniel Craig, who played the character in the films. Craig was reluctant to be involved in a Bond game: "When I started signing contracts for Bond I said, 'I'm not doing the computer game' and they said, 'Tough, you are'. I said to the people making the Bond game, 'You've got to make this good because there is so much rubbish out there.'" Craig played the game during development and provided feedback.

Executive producer Garrett Young said that Craig's version of Bond "isn't quite as reliant on gadgets as previous Bonds, but with the OK from the filmmakers, we added the gadgets we felt would be fun and that would help gameplay, yet still fit within the world of the new, more realistic James Bond". The hacking feature was added to provide variety to the combat gameplay.

Craig provided his likeness and voice for the game, along with other cast members from the two films, including Judi Dench as M, Eva Green as Vesper Lynd, Mads Mikkelsen as Le Chiffre, Olga Kurylenko as Camille Montes, and Mathieu Amalric as Dominic Greene. Craig's likeness was created using three-dimensional scans and photographs of the actor, and the other cast members underwent the same process. Treyarch added the third-person perspective to allow for Craig's Bond to be more visible to players. Stuntman Ray Park performed the motion capture for Bond and most of the other characters.

== Release ==
The game was released in Europe on 31 October 2008, followed by the U.S. debut on 4 November. In Australia, the game was released on 19 November. The release coincided with the film's theatrical debut, making it the first film-based Bond game to release concurrently with its source material. A collector's edition of the PS3 and Xbox 360 versions was released in the U.K. It included a metallic game case and a bonus disc with behind-the-scenes footage.

In Japan, Square Enix published the game for home consoles on 26 March 2009, two months after the film's release there. Quantum of Solace and other Bond games by Activision were removed from the company's website and Steam in January 2013, reportedly due to expiration of the game rights licence.

== Music ==
The music was composed and produced by Christopher Lennertz, who previously scored the 2005 Bond game From Russia with Love. Lennertz began working on the score in early 2008, while parts of the game were still in a conceptual stage. To maintain a classic Bond sound, Lennertz rewatched Casino Royale and also listened to previous Bond scores by John Barry.

The game's score was recorded in two locations, with strings and winds handled in Bratislava, followed by brass and percussion recording with members of the Hollywood Studio Symphony at Capitol Studios in Hollywood. According to Lennertz, "The brass is especially integral to the sound of any Bond music and I felt that at the end of the day it absolutely needed to be performed by players who really understood the genre and could blast in a way that might not come as naturally to classical players, so I fought long and hard and eventually got permission to record [at Capitol Studios]".

The game features a different theme song from that of the film. Titled "When Nobody Loves You", it was written by Richard Fortus and Kerli, and performed by them along with David Maurice, who produced and arranged it. The song plays over an opening title sequence that is proprietary to the game, but based on the film's pre-credits sequence.

== Reception ==
Reception

Aggregate score
Aggregator	Score					
Aggregator	DS	PC	PS2	PS3	Wii	Xbox 360
Metacritic	65/100	70/100	73/100	65/100	54/100	65/100

Review scores
Publication	Score					
Publication	DS	PC	PS2	PS3	Wii	Xbox 360
Game Informer				6.5/10		6.5/10
GameRevolution				C−		C−
GameSpot						7/10
GameSpy				2.5/5		2.5/5
GamesRadar+			3/5			
GameStar		67/100				
GameTrailers						7.4/10
GameZone	7/10	7.8/10	7.5/10	7/10	5/10	8/10
IGN	6.8/10	7.2/10	7.8/10		4.5/10	7/10
Nintendo Power	60/100				50/100	
Nintendo World Report	7/10					
Official Nintendo Magazine					52%	
PC PowerPlay		7/10				
Pocket Gamer	6/10					
TeamXbox						7/10
VideoGamer.com				9/10		9/10

Across all platforms, Quantum of Solace received "mixed or average reviews" according to Metacritic. Criticism went to the game's short length and lack of replay value, as well as poor AI. The graphics received a mixed response, with praise going towards the character models, while criticism went to the environments. Praise went to the music and voice acting, as well as the multiplayer options.

The gameplay was a source of criticism, generally viewed as repetitive and lacking in variety. Seth Schiesel of The New York Times was critical of the excessive shooting gameplay and lack of driving levels. Bryan Stratton of GameSpy also found the gameplay repetitive: "There's no real hand-to-hand combat, no puzzle-solving to speak of, and all of the best vehicular action is limited to cut-scenes". Greg Nicksarlian of GameZone stated that the cover system "works fairly well, but it also means that you have very little freedom in approaching the gunplay. Those who wish to run and gun will quickly regret it. The result is a mechanic that feels overused very quickly when almost every encounter requires you to find cover and methodically fire on the enemy". Others found the cover system to be glitchy and unresponsive.

Travis Moses of GamePro concluded that the game "can't stand up to the properties it was based on, hampered by bland and repetitive gameplay". Ben Fritz of Variety found the game to play "more like a series of new 'Call of Duty' levels", criticizing the decision to develop a spy game with an engine used for a military game. He considered it a decent action game which "doesn't remotely capture the spirit of its source material", falling "well short of the year's best shooters".

Critics generally believed that Quantum of Solace, like previous Bond games, failed to live up to the standards set by GoldenEye. Conversely, Roy Kimber of VideoGamer.com called it "GoldenEye for a new generation and by far the best Bond game we've had in years", stating, "Praise really doesn't come much higher than that". Jesse Constantino of GameRevolution found it too similar to GoldenEye, making for an outdated experience: "The play mechanics, level designs, simplified stealth play, predictable A.I., and even the available weapons all feel very much like those found in Goldeneye 007. Developers at Treyarch focused so much on returning the series to the former glory of 1997 that they forgot we were all still living in 2008". Despite the criticism, the Academy of Interactive Arts & Sciences nominated Quantum of Solace for "Outstanding Achievement in Adapted Story" during the 12th Annual Interactive Achievement Awards.

=== Storyline ===
Criticism went towards the combination of both film storylines in a single game. Andrew Reiner of Game Informer criticized the lack of chronological order: "The result is a plot that bounces chaotically like a super ball in a stairwell. It's impossible to comprehend what is going on in this game unless you have seen both films". According to Nicksarlian, the game "flies by at such a rushed pace that it's hard to imagine anyone could actually follow the plot here without being familiar with the films".

Alex Sassoon Coby, writing for GameSpot, found that the Casino Royale portion occupied too much of the game and felt out of place in the storyline. Constantino wrote, "The majority of your time is spent recapping the events of Casino Royale, with only a few brief opening and closing sections taken from the game's namesake", stating further that the voice acting "does little to clarify the haphazard patchwork of random sequences and events culled from the two films". Nate Ahearn of IGN opined that the game felt like it was originally intended as a Casino Royale tie-in which missed that film's release date, prompting the developers "to tack on a few [Quantum of Solace] locations and slap a new name on the box".

=== PS2, Wii and DS versions ===
Natalie Romano of GameZone found the PS2 version an adequate alternative to the PS3/Xbox 360 version, while Ahearn considered it more enjoyable thanks to its third-person perspective. However, the PS2 version did receive criticism for its lack of multiplayer.

The Wii version was criticized for its difficult motion controls, as well as poor graphics and frame rate, the latter contributing further to the game's difficulty. Mark Bozon of IGN considered the Wii version a "wreck" because of its numerous issues, calling the frame rate "unreliable at best, and broken entirely in some areas". Nintendo Power considered the frame rate "extremely choppy" at times, and found the graphics to range from "so-so to downright ugly". David Clayman of IGN determined the PC, PS3 and Xbox 360 versions to be the best, writing about the others, "The Wii version is not exactly a stellar game but it does have some redeeming qualities like the local multiplayer. The PS2 lacks even that and is a lackluster package at best".

The DS version was praised for its gameplay ideas, although critics found the execution to be poor. The touchscreen-based controls were considered difficult and unreliable in their accuracy, with hand-to-hand combat receiving particular criticism. Some critics also considered the isometric view too zoomed-in, making it difficult to shoot at distant enemies. Others praised the upgrade system. Jon Mundy of Pocket Gamer wrote that despite its original ideas, the game "fails to capture the kinetic energy and style" of the two films, stating, "The clunky hand-to-hand combat and a few too many rough edges rob the game of momentum". In a positive review, Neal Ronaghan of Nintendo World Report called it "not only a great movie adaptation, but a good, mildly innovative video game".
