= High Heat =

High Heat may refer to

- High Heat (novel) (2003), American young adult novel
- High Heat (2014 TV show), a sports-themed talk show on MLB Network
- High Heat (TV series) (2022), Mexican drama streaming series
- High Heat (film) (2022), American action film

== See also ==
- High Heat Major League Baseball (1998-2003), baseball video game series
