= Max Benitz =

British actor and journalist (born 1985)

- Born: 14 March 1985 (age 41); London, England
- Occupations: Journalist, writer, actor
- Spouse: Celia Weinstock (m. 2023)
- Children: 2

Maximillian Benitz (born 14 March 1985) is a British writer, journalist, and former actor.

== Early life, family and education ==
Benitz was born on 14 March 1985 in London.

He attended Harrow School from 1998 to 2003, where he appeared in student productions of As You Like It, Hamlet, The Pirates of Penzance, and Me and My Girl.

Benitz went on to study history at the University of Edinburgh. As an undergraduate, he completed a nine-month programme at University of Calcutta, after which, in 2007, he embarked, with friend and fellow University of Edinburgh student George Vlasto, in a journey from Calcutta to London by car. The trip, undertaken in a Hindustan Ambassador car, took ten weeks and covered 9,000 miles (14,000 km) in a route that passed through India, Pakistan, China, Central Asia, Turkey and Europe. As a part of journey, they raised more than £12,000 for the charities Future Hope in Calcutta and Royal Marsden Hospital on behalf of disadvantaged children.

== Career ==
He completed two weeks' work experience as a filing clerk at the offices of The Spectator magazine.

=== Acting ===
Benitz was a teenager when acting in what may be his best known role, as Midshipman Peter Calamy in the 2003 film Master and Commander: The Far Side of the World. Boris Johnson, then editor of the Spectator, after seeing Benitz's performance in the film, wrote that Benitz had shown "much the same dash and dispatch [as Calamy] in rescuing my Toyota [automobile] from the car pound." While still a teenager, Benitz next appeared in a small role as Huband in the 2005 TV movie of Thomas Hughes' novel Tom Brown's Schooldays. In 2007, Benitz featured prominently as James Harrogate in the two-part episode "Sins of the Father" of the tenth series of Trial & Retribution.

After 2007, concentrating on his journalism career, Benitz, as of 2023, has only appeared in two films The Water Diviner (2014) and Mara (2018).

=== Journalism ===
In 2008–09, Benitz worked as an unpaid journalist for the MOBY Group and as a freelancer in Afghanistan, covering the activities of the British Army in that country. His book, Six Months Without Sundays: The Scots Guards in Afghanistan, was published by Birlinn in November 2011.

== Personal life ==
Benitz has one son with actress and his former partner Olga Kurylenko, born on 3 October 2015.

Benitz married Celia Weinstock, granddaughter of Lord Weinstock, at the Savoy Chapel in London on 10 March 2023. Their son was born on 9 November 2024.
