= Olga Kurylenko =

Ukrainian-French actress and model (born 1979)

- Ольга Куриленко
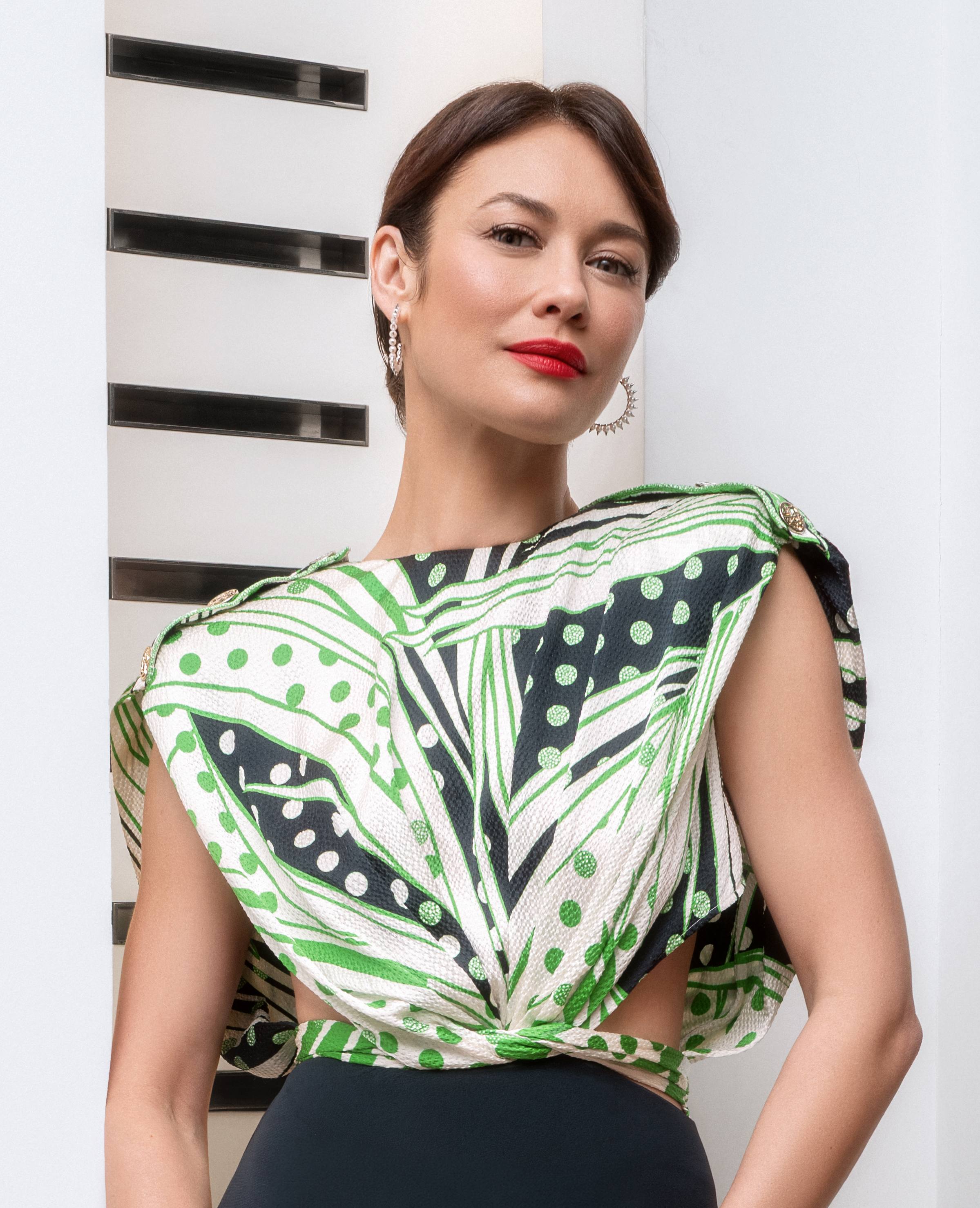
- Kurylenko in 2026
- Born: Olga Kostyantynivna Kurylenko; 14 November 1979 (age 46); Berdyansk, Ukrainian SSR, Soviet Union
- Citizenship: Soviet Union (until 1991); Ukraine (1991–2001); France (from 2001)
- Occupations: Actress; model
- Years active: 1995–present
- Spouses: Cédric van Mol (m. 2000; div. 2004); Damian Gabrielle (m. 2006; div. 2007)
- Children: 1

Olga Kostyantynivna Kurylenko (Note: In this name that follows East Slavic naming customs, the patronymic is Kostyantynivna and the family name is Kurylenko.) (Note: Ukrainian: Ольга Костянтинівна Куриленко, romanized: Olha Kostiantynivna Kurylenko, IPA: [ˈɔlʲɦɐ kosʲtʲɐnˈtɪn⁽ʲ⁾iu̯nɐ kʊrɪˈlɛnko]) (born 14 November 1979) is a Ukrainian-born French actress and former model. She rose to prominence by playing the Bond girl Camille Montes in the James Bond film Quantum of Solace (2008).

Kurylenko began her career modelling in Paris before making a transition to acting. She had her breakthrough role in the action thriller Hitman (2007) after making her film debut in the drama The Ring Finger (2005). Following Quantum of Solace, she went on to star in the romantic drama To the Wonder (2012), the crime comedy Seven Psychopaths (2012), the science fiction film Oblivion (2013), the political satire The Death of Stalin (2017), the comedy The Man Who Killed Don Quixote (2018), the superhero films Black Widow (2021) and Thunderbolts* (2025), the Netflix spy thriller miniseries Treason (2022) and the action thriller Extraction 2 (2023).

== Early life ==
Olga Kostyantynivna Kurylenko was born on 14 November 1979 in Berdyansk, Zaporizhzhia Oblast, Ukrainian SSR, Soviet Union. Her father, Konstantin Kurylenko, is Ukrainian. Her mother, Marina Alyabusheva, teaches art and is an exhibited artist. Marina's father was a Russian factory worker, and her mother, Raisa, was a Belarusian doctor. Kurylenko's parents divorced when she was three years old. Growing up poor, she lived in a small house with her maternal grandparents, Marina and their relatives. Kurylenko rarely had contact with Konstantin, meeting him for the first time after the split at the age of eight and later at the age of thirteen.

== Career ==
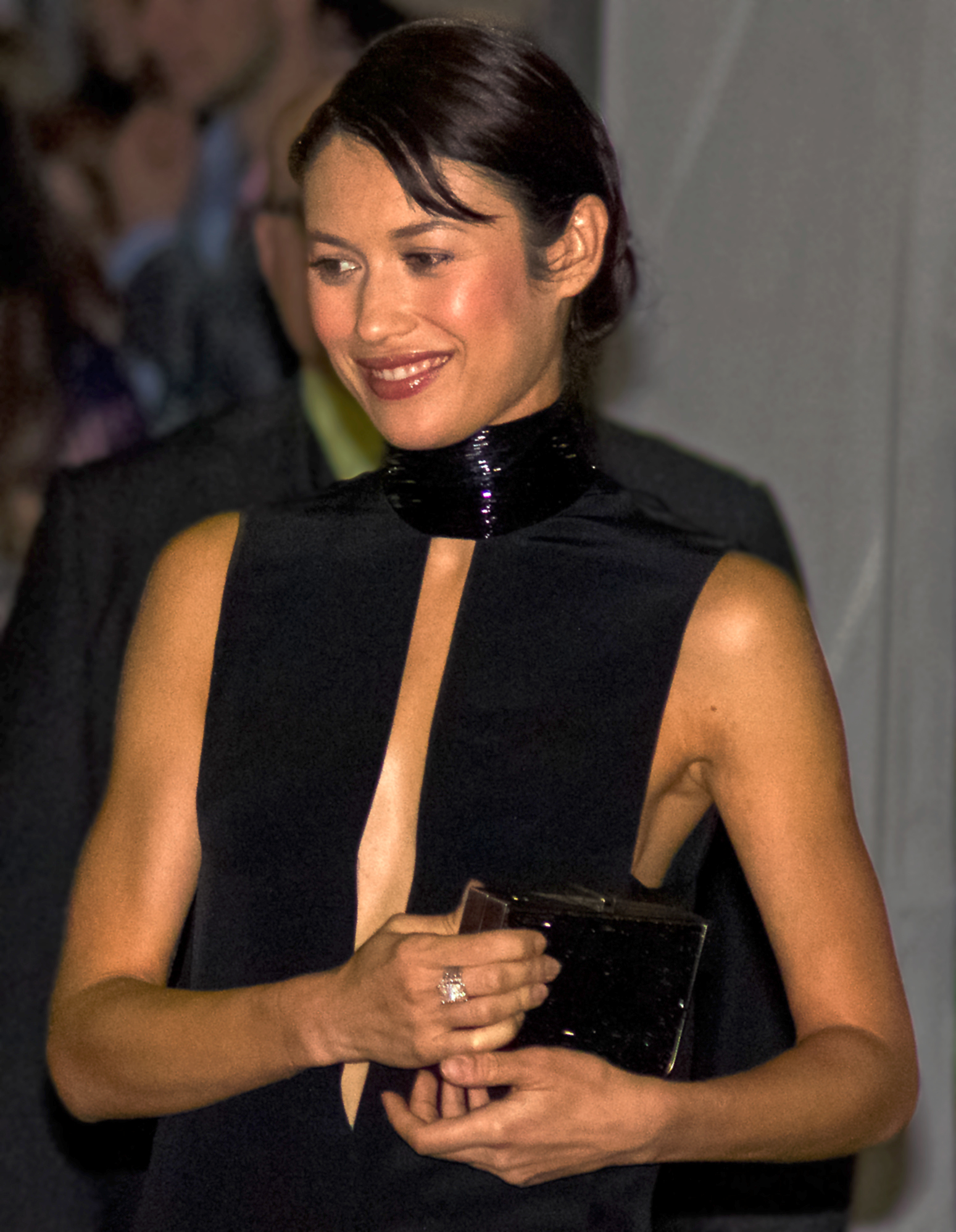
Kurylenko at the 2012 Toronto International Film Festival premiere of Seven Psychopaths

Kurylenko moved to Moscow at age 15. At age 16, she moved to Paris. In 1996, Kurylenko signed a contract with the Paris-based Madison modelling agency where she met her publicist Valérie Rosen. The following year, by the age of 18, she had appeared on the covers of Vogue and Elle magazines. While working as a model in Paris, Kurylenko supported her mother in Ukraine.

She also appeared on the covers of Madame Figaro and Marie Claire magazines. She became the face of brands Bebe, Clarins, and Helena Rubinstein. She has also modelled for Roberto Cavalli and Kenzo and appeared in the Victoria's Secret catalogue. In 1998, she features in the music video of French Raï style singer Faudel called "Tellement Je T'aime".

One of her first acting appearances was in Seal's music video "Love's Divine" in 2003, but her film career truly began in France in 2004 when she shot her first feature film, The Ring Finger, for which she received the certificate of excellence award at the 2006 Brooklyn International Film Festival for her performance. She next starred in the Paris, je t'aime (2006) segment Quartier de la Madeleine opposite Elijah Wood. That same year, she was selected to be the face of Kenzo's new fragrance, Kenzo Amour. She has appeared in all subsequent Kenzo Amour advertisements.

Kurylenko quit modelling in 2006, after more than ten years of working in the industry, and moved on to acting. In 2007, she starred in Hitman alongside Timothy Olyphant. She had a minor role in Max Payne as Natasha.

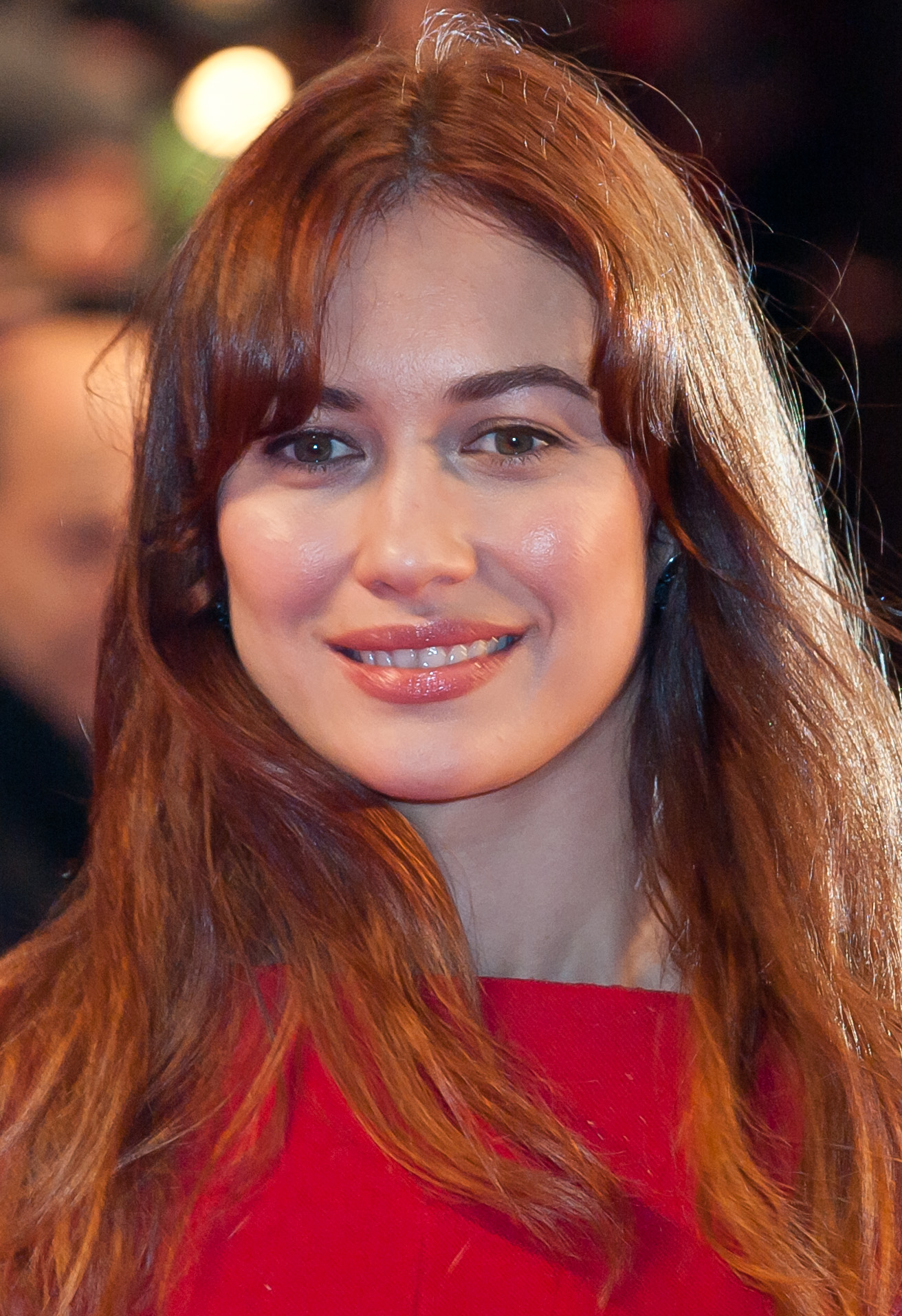
Kurylenko at the 65th Berlin International Film Festival in 2015

She played Bond girl Camille Montes in the 2008 James Bond film, Quantum of Solace (after beating out Gal Gadot in the auditions). In the film she plays the role of Bolivian Secret Service agent Camille Montes, who teams up with Bond to stop a terrorist organization and avenge the death of her parents. Russian politician Sergey Malinkovich wrote an open letter to Kurylenko. In it he said: "In the name of all communists we appeal to you ... deserter of Slavic world. The Soviet Union gave you free education, free medical care but nobody knew you would commit an act of intellectual and moral betrayal and become a movie girl of Bond, who in his movies kills hundreds of Soviet people and citizens of other socialist countries."

She was featured on the cover of the December 2008 issue of the US edition of Maxim magazine and on the cover of the February 2009 issue of the Ukrainian edition of Maxim. In Ukraine the mayor of Berdyansk suggested naming a street after her in early 2008, and she and her mother met Ukraine's First Lady Kateryna Yushchenko in President Victor Yushchenko's family country house.

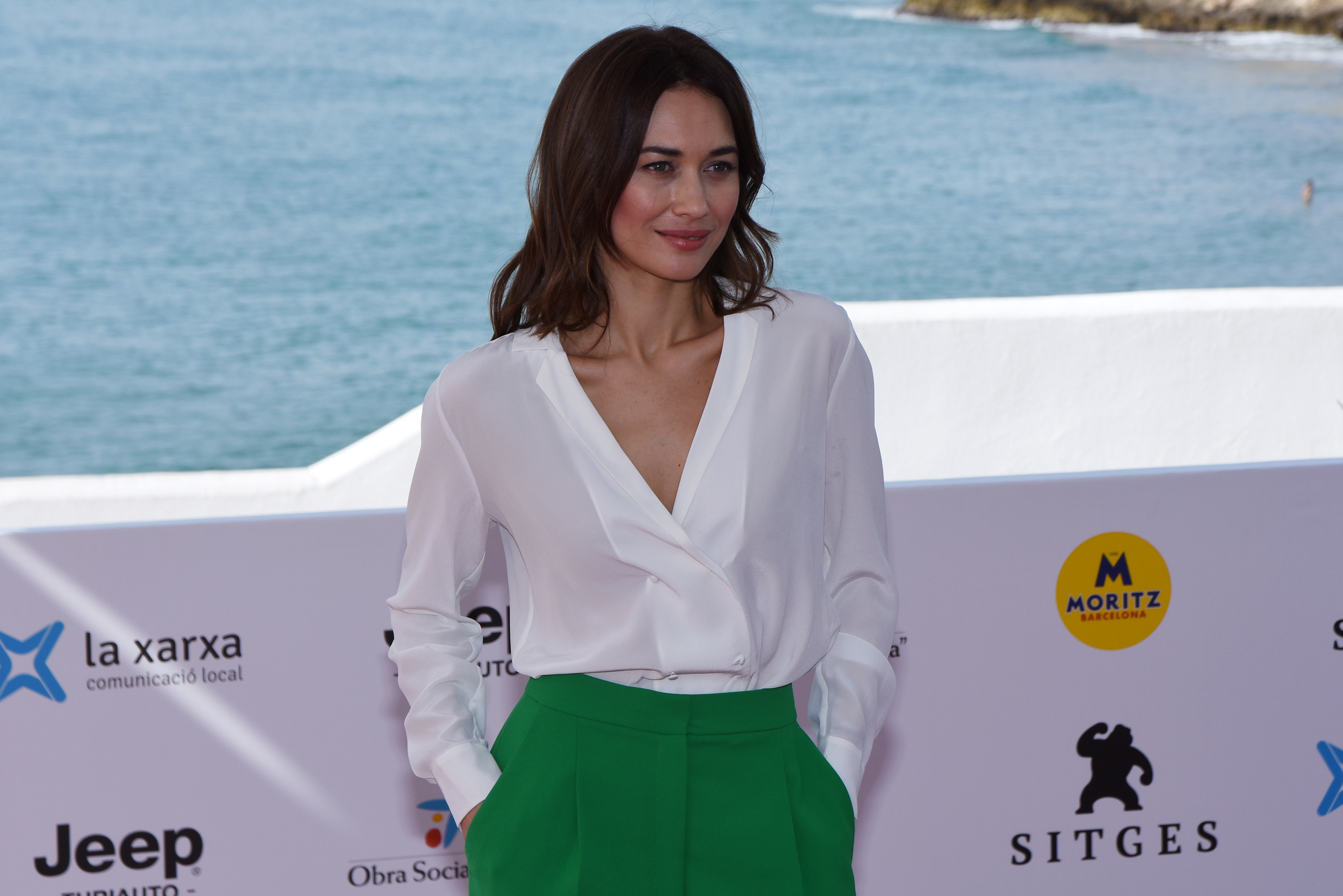
Kurylenko at the Sitges Film Festival in 2019

Kurylenko appeared in Terrence Malick's romantic drama film To the Wonder starring Ben Affleck and Rachel McAdams. The film was shot in the fall of 2010 in Bartlesville, Oklahoma. She also appeared in Oblivion, a science fiction film starring Tom Cruise and directed by Joseph Kosinski. Kurylenko played Alice Fournier in the spy thriller November Man. In 2014, Kurylenko starred in the historical drama film The Water Diviner alongside Russell Crowe (who made his directorial debut), Jacqueline McKenzie and Jai Courtney. She also played the headmistress in Vampire Academy. She later acted in films such as Momentum, Mara and The Bay of Silence.

In 2017, she appeared in Armando Iannucci's political satire film The Death of Stalin as the Soviet pianist Maria Yudina. The film was a critical success and starred Steve Buscemi, Simon Russell Beale, Jason Isaacs, Michael Palin, and Jeffrey Tambor. The following year she starred in Terry Gilliam's epic adventure film The Man Who Killed Don Quixote (2018) starring Adam Driver and Jonathan Pryce where it premiered at the 2018 Cannes Film Festival. She also appeared as Baroness Roxane de Giverny in The Emperor of Paris, and as the Russian spy in the Rowan Atkinson led comedy film Johnny English Strikes Again (2018).

In 2021, she starred in the action thriller film Sentinelle. In the same year, she played Antonia Dreykov / Taskmaster in the Marvel Cinematic Universe (MCU) film Black Widow. In October, she was cast in comedy heist film High Heat alongside Don Johnson.

== Personal life ==
Kurylenko acquired French citizenship in 2001, which she called "a practical decision" because it was easier to travel with a French passport without a visa, as opposed to travelling with a Ukrainian passport. In 2000, Kurylenko married French fashion photographer Cédric van Mol, whom she divorced four years later. In 2006, Kurylenko married American mobile phone accessory entrepreneur Damian Gabrielle, whom she divorced the next year. She moved to London in 2009. Kurylenko has a son with her former partner, English actor and writer Max Benitz, whom she met in 2014.

== Filmography ==
=== Film ===
Year	Title	Role	Director	Notes	Ref.
2005	The Ring Finger	Iris	Diane Bertrand		
2006	Paris, je t'aime	The Vampire	Vincenzo Natali	Segment: Quartier de la Madeleine	
2006	The Serpent	Sofia	Éric Barbier		
2007	Hitman	Nika Boronina	Xavier Gens		
2008	À l'est de moi (To My East)	The Russian prostitute	Bojena Horackova		
2008	Max Payne	Natasha Sax	John Moore		
2008	Quantum of Solace	Camille Montes	Marc Forster		
2009	The Assassin Next Door	Galia	Danny Lerner		
2010	Centurion	Etain	Neil Marshall		
2011	There Be Dragons	Ildiko	Roland Joffé		
2011	Land of Oblivion	Anya	Michale Boganim	Also executive producer	
2012	Erased	Anna Brandt	Philipp Stölzl		
2012	To the Wonder	Marina	Terrence Malick		
2012	Seven Psychopaths	Angela	Martin McDonagh		
2013	Oblivion	Julia Rusakova Harper	Joseph Kosinski		
2014	Vampire Academy	Ellen Kirova	Mark Waters		
2014	The November Man	Alice Fournier/Mira Filipova	Roger Donaldson		
2014	The Water Diviner	Ayshe	Russell Crowe		
2015	A Perfect Day	Katya	Fernando León de Aranoa		
2015	Momentum	Alex Farraday	Stephen S. Campanelli		
2016	The Correspondence	Amy	Giuseppe Tornatore		
2017	The Death of Stalin	Maria Yudina	Armando Iannucci		
2017	Gun Shy	Sheila	Simon West		
2018	Just a Breath Away (Dans la brume)	Anna	Daniel Roby		
2018	The Man Who Killed Don Quixote	Jacqui	Terry Gilliam		
2018	Mara	Kate Fuller	Clive Tonge		
2018	Johnny English Strikes Again	Ophelia	David Kerr		
2018	The Emperor of Paris	Baroness Roxane of Giverny	Jean-François Richet		
2019	L'Intervention	Jane Anderson	Fred Grivois		
2019	The Room	Kate	Christian Volckman		
2019	The Courier	The Courier	Zackary Adler		
2019	The Translators	Katerina Anisinova	Rėgis Roinsard		
2020	The Bay of Silence	Rosalind	Paula van der Oest		
2021	Sentinelle	Klara	Julien Leclercq		
2021	Black Widow	Antonia Dreykov / Taskmaster	Cate Shortland		
2022	Vanishing	Alice	Denis Dercourt	Korean-French Film	
2022	White Elephant	Vanessa Flynn	Jesse V. Johnson		
2022	The Princess	Moira	Le-Van Kiet		
2022	High Heat	Ana	Zach Golden		
2023	Extraction 2	Mia	Sam Hargrave		
2023	Boudica: The Queen of War	Boudica	Jesse V. Johnson		
2023	Paradox Effect	Karina	Scott Weintrob		
2024	Chief of Station	Krystyna Kowerski	Jesse V. Johnson		
2025	Thunderbolts*	Antonia Dreykov / Taskmaster	Jake Schreier		
2025	Fox Hunt	Elsa	Leo Zhang		
2025	Other	Alice	David Moreau		
2025	Afterburn	Drea	J. J. Perry		
2025	Turbulence	Julia	Claudio Fäh		
2026	Alter ego	Tatiana Chambon	Nicolas & Bruno		
2026	My Sister's Bones	Dr. Shaw	Heidi Greensmith	British Film	
2026	Misdirection	Sara Black	Kevin Lewis		
2026	The Three Urns	The Woman in Black	John-Paul Davidson & Stephen Warbeck		
—N/a	Empires of the Deep †	The Mermaid Queen	Jonathan Lawrence, Michael French, & Scott Miller	Unreleased	

=== Television ===
Year	Title	Role	Director	Notes	Ref.
2001	Largo Winch	Carole		TV series (1 Episode : "Contessa Vanessa")	
2006	Le porte-bonheur	Sophia	Laurent Dussaux	TV movie	
2007	Suspectes	Eva Pirès		TV miniseries (7 episodes)	
2010	Tyranny	Mina Harud	John Beck Hofmann	TV series (5 episodes); also writer	
2012–2013	Magic City	Vera Evans	Mainly Ed Bianchi and Simon Cellan Jones	TV series (16 episodes)	
2014	Mission Control	NASA broadcasting news	Will Ferrell	Episode 13: Go Home	
2020	Wonderland, the girl from the shore	Alice	Hervé Hadmar	6 episodes	
2022	Treason	Kara Yusova		TV miniseries (5 episodes)	
2023	Of Money and Blood	Julia	Xavier Giannoli and Frederic Planchon	TV miniseries	
2025	Super Mâles	Léna	Olivier Rosemberg and Noémie Saglio	TV miniseries	
2026	The Terminal List	Yana Tomenko	Paul Cameron, Carl Seaton, Tucker Gates, Ray Mendoza, Ben Wheatley, Marcos Siega, and Kate Dennis	6 episodes	

=== Video game ===
Year	Title	Role	Notes	Ref.
2008	007: Quantum of Solace	Camille Montes (voice)		

== Awards and nominations ==
List of Olga Kurylenko award nominations and awards won
Year	Awards	Category	Recipient	Result	Ref.
2005	Brooklyn International Film Festival	Best Actress	The Ring Finger	Won	
2008	Saturn Award	Best Supporting Actress	Quantum of Solace	Nominated	
2009	Empire Awards	Best Actress	Quantum of Solace	Nominated	
2012	Boston Society of Film Critics Award	Best Cast	Seven Psychopaths	Won	
2012	San Diego Film Critics Society Award	Best Performance by an Ensemble	Seven Psychopaths	Nominated	
