= Other (film) =

2025 film directed by David Moreau

- Film poster
- Directed by: David Moreau
- Written by: David Moreau; Jon Goldman
- Starring: Olga Kurylenko
- Distributed by: Wild Bunch Distribution; Shudder
- Release date: 9 July 2025
- Running time: 95 minutes
- Countries: France; Belgium
- Language: English

Other is a 2025 French/Belgian horror film directed by David Moreau, written by David Moreau and Jon Goldman, and starring Olga Kurylenko and Anne-Pascale Clairembourg.

== Premise ==
After her mother is mysteriously murdered, a woman named Alice returns to her mother's house to discover that it is now full of surveillance systems.

== Cast ==
- Olga Kurylenko as Alice
  - Lola Bonaventure as Alice (17 years old)
- Jean Schatz as The Beast
- Jacqueline Ghaye as Elena (64 years old)
  - Anne-Pascale Clairembourg as Elena (43 years old)
- Sacha Nugent as Boy with a Mask
- Philip Schurer as Charlie
- Julie Maes as Julie

== Release ==
Other was released in France on July 9, 2025, and in the United States on November 18, 2025. It is distributed by Shudder.

== Reception ==
On the review aggregator website Rotten Tomatoes, 36% of 14 critics' reviews are positive.

Brian Tallerico of RogerEbert.com gave the film 1.5 stars out of 4, commenting that "Moreau can't quite figure out what story he's telling here, or the best way to tell it", and calling it "a film that’s too often annoyingly fleeing from its best ideas." In a more favorable review, John Serba of Decider comments that the film "doesn't quite balance its intellectual and emotional components, but it's a compelling horror outing with more assets than flaws."
