= The Ring Finger =

2005 film by Diane Bertrand

- Directed by: Diane Bertrand
- Written by: Diane Bertrand
- Starring: Olga Kurylenko
- Cinematography: Alain Duplantier
- Edited by: Nathalie Langlade
- Music by: Beth Gibbons
- Distributed by: Les Films du Veyrier
- Release date: 8 June 2005 (France)
- Running time: 104 minutes
- Countries: France; Germany; United Kingdom
- Language: French

The Ring Finger (French: L'Annulaire) is a French film released on 8 June 2005. It was written (based on a novel by Yōko Ogawa) and directed by Diane Bertrand.

== Plot ==
Iris (Olga Kurylenko) is a young woman working in a bottle washing factory. She loses the tip of her ring finger in an accident at work and leaves her job. She moves to a nearby port city and comes across a job working for a strange laboratory at which people have "specimens" preserved.

== Cast ==
- Olga Kurylenko as Iris
- Marc Barbé as The laboratory man
- Stipe Erceg as The sailor
- Édith Scob as The Lady of the 223
- Hanns Zischler as The hotel owner
- Sotigui Kouyaté as The Shoe shine
- Anne Benoît as The score lady
- Doria Achour as The mushrooms girl
- Louis Dewynter as The kid
- Anne Fassio as Madame Ryen
- Olivier Claverie as Monsieur Ryen
