= Land of Oblivion =

2011 French film

- Movie poster
- Directed by: Michale Boganim
- Written by: Michale Boganim; Anne Weil; Antoine Lacomblez
- Produced by: Les Films du Poisson
- Starring: Olga Kurylenko; Andrzej Chyra; Ilya Iosifov
- Release dates: September 4, 2011 (Venice Film Festival); March 28, 2012 (France)
- Running time: 108 min.
- Country: France
- Language: Ukrainian / French / Russian

Land of Oblivion (original French title: La Terre outragée) is a 2011 film by director Michale Boganim. It is concerned with the immediate local effects of the Chernobyl disaster.

== Plot ==
April 26, 1986, day when the accident at the Chernobyl disaster power plant shocked the whole world. Technological progress was cursed by millions, and for such as Anya, Chernobyl was a personal disaster — she was widowed on her wedding day; for such as Valery, Chernobyl — a synonym for lost childhood and a crippled future. Endless battle with yourself and fruitless search for what is worth living, it's not all the tests that had to go through the main characters.

== Cast ==
- Olga Kurylenko as Anya
- Andrzej Chyra as Aleksei
- Ilya Iosifov as Valery in age 16
- Sergei Strelnikov as Dmitri
- Vyacheslav Slanko as Nikolay
- Nicolas Wanczycki ad Patrick

== Reception ==
The film was selected to Venice film festival 2011 and to Toronto film festival and another 50 festivals all over he world. "La Terre Outragée will turn heads. This beautifully textured drama about the Chernobyl disaster and its long-term legacy was shot on location, giving the film a shocking sense of immediacy. The camera captures the sobering reality of the environmental catastrophe that devastated Ukraine. But the eerily vacant landscape is only a backdrop to the human cost of the tragedy, which is what director and writer Michale Boganim focuses on in her authoritative feature debut".FRom Toronto film festival Pierce Handling. Critical reception for Land of Oblivion was very good, with Variety praising the movie's production design. The French release was a critical success. 3.7 /5 . Allociné. The film was highly praised in Japan when released after Fukushima disaster . Indiewire's The Playlist stating that "it does slowly find its rhythm, and so the film rather eloquently builds a picture not just of the lives shattered by disaster, but also these after-lives that are defined by it.
