= Tyranny (TV series) =

- Genre: Drama; Political thriller Science fiction
- Created by: John Beck Hofmann
- Directed by: John Beck Hofmann
- Starring: John Beck Hofmann; Olga Kurylenko; Bitsie Tulloch; Kieren van den Blink; Mikael Forsberg; Mimi Ferrer; Sarah Coleman; Sasha Townsend; Aric Green; Enrico Piazza; Kurt Hargan; Nathan Marlow; Steve Collins; Sam Durrani; Jay Lewis; John Burton Jr.
- Composers: Silasfunk; Mimi Page
- Country of origin: United States
- Original language: English
- No. of seasons: 1
- No. of episodes: 22

Production
- Producer: John Beck Hofmann
- Production locations: Prague, CZ; Tokyo, JP; Istanbul, TR; Paris, FR; Geneva, CH; Cairo, EG; Playa del Carmen, MX; Svalbard, NO; Stockholm, SE; San Francisco, CA; New Orleans, LA; New York, NY; Washington, DC
- Cinematography: Silas Funk; Garret Baquet
- Running time: Varies (4–8 minutes)
- Production company: Weatherman Films

Original release
- Network: KoldCast TV
- Release: March 11 – November 25, 2010

Tyranny is an American drama and political thriller series that premiered on March 11, 2010 on KoldCast TV. Written and directed by John Beck Hofmann, the series is centered on a man who, after volunteering for a neurological experiment at UC Berkeley in 1999, finds himself having visions of a troubling future and must understand what the visions mean before that future comes to pass.

Hofmann has said that the movies Twelve Monkeys, The Game, Manchurian Candidate, and Kafka were influences on Tyranny.

== Characters ==
- John Beck Hofmann as Daniel McCarthy
- Olga Kurylenko as Mina Harud
- Bitsie Tulloch as Alex Hubbard
- Kieren van den Blink as Isabelle Lorenz
- Mikael Forsberg as Pavel Novak
- Mimi Ferrer as Myra Ripley
- Sarah Coleman as Ariel Huckster
- Aric Green as Ethan Chambers
- Sasha Townsend as Demas Hunter
- Enrico Piazza as Dr. Jacob Malik
- Nathan Marlow as Special Agent Holden
- Steve Collins as Edson Cross
- John Burton, Jr. as Dr. Lloyd Freeman
- Sammy Durrani as July Ripley
- Victor Holstein as Jack Diamond
- Jay Lewis as Malcolm Storz

== Awards ==
Tyranny was accepted as part of the official selection of the Geneva International Film Festival, November 2010. The series also received four 2010 Indie Intertube Award nominations for: sound design, soundtrack, best looking show and best thriller.
