= Michale Boganim =

French screenwriter and film director (born 1977)

Michale Boganim french screenwriter and film director. Her feature-length films include La Terre outragée (2011) or Odessa, Odessa (2005).

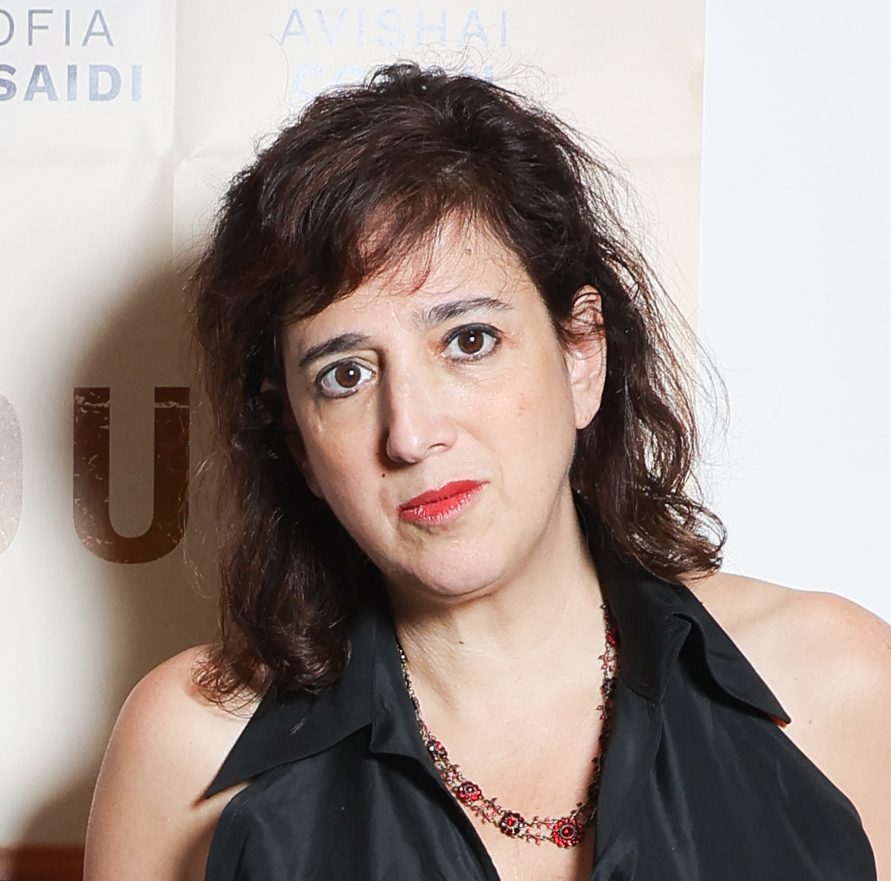
Michale Boganim in 2023

== Life and career ==
Boganim was born the 17 of July 1977 in Jewish family with ancestors from Ukraine on her mother's side. She grew up in France where her family had emigrated in 1984. She studied political science and anthropology at the Sorbonne in Paris under Jean Rouch. After graduating, she returned to Paris and worked as an assistant producer and director for several film companies. Boganim went on to study film techniques and directing, first at the Institut National Supérieur des Arts du Spectacle in Belgium for a brief period and then at the prestigious National Film and Television School in the UK, where she graduated in 2000. she is developing a new project six months, six days, which got best Pitch at Locarno film festival and was script doctored by Christopher Hampton.

Dust and Mémoires incertaines (Dim Memories), two of her short documentary films made at the National Film School, would later form the basis for Odessa, Odessa, her first feature-length film. Mémoires incertaines was presented at the Directors' Fortnight of the 2002 Cannes Festival, where it won the Prix Gras-Savoye. Dust won the International Film Critics prize at the 2002 Krakow Film Festival and the Best Short Documentary award at the Leeds International Film Festival. Her feature-length documentary Odessa, Odessa was released in 2005 and shown at numerous film festivals including Sundance and the Berlin Film Festival where it was awarded the CICAE Prize. It follows the lives and reminiscences of elderly Russian Jews who remained behind in Odesa after World War II and those who took up a life as exiles in Ashdod, Israel and the Brighton Beach neighborhood of Brooklyn.

Boganim's first feature-length fiction film, La Terre outragée (Land of Oblivion) was premiered at the Venice Film Festival in 2011. and Toronto film festival, Chicago film festival, Palm Spring, San Francisco, Tokyo etc. Starring Olga Kurylenko and Andrzej Chyra, it was filmed in Pripyat which had been rendered a ghost city by the Chernobyl disaster in 1986. The film was positively reviewed in the French press, including the Cahiers du Cinéma, won several awards, and was broadcast on European television. Boganim's first English-language film Lost in America is in pre-production as of 2018. The film is a coming-of-age drama set in Manhattan and the Hassidic community of Brooklyn's Borough Park.

== Filmography ==
- 2000 Dust, (35 minutes) as director and screenwriter, documentary on the remnants of Yiddish culture in Odesa, National Film and Television School production
- 2001 Mémoires incertaines (Dim Memories) (35 minutes), as director and screenwriter, documentary on Boganim's search for the real identity of her mysterious great uncle with each member of the family telling a different story about him, National Film and Television School production
- 2004 Macao sans retour (Last Stop, Macau) (52 minutes), as director, documentary on Macau, French/Portuguese co-production, selected for the 2005 Rotterdam Film Festival
- 2004 Odessa, Odessa (102 minutes), as director and screenwriter, documentary on the lives of Jewish exiles from Odesa and those who remained in the city, premiered at the Jerusalem Film Festival. French/Israeli co-production
- 2006 Bienvenue chez Dovid (26 minutes), as director, documentary on Yiddish researcher and linguist Dovid Katz filmed in Lithuania and Belarus for the Arte television series Visages d'Europe. The film received a "Mention spécial" at the 2007 Doc en Courts festival in Lyon.
- 2008 Bienvenue chez Renata (26 minutes) as director, documentary on a cafe in Gdańsk for the Arte television series Visages d'Europe. A portrait of twin sister waitresses at a Gdańsk Shipyard Cafe.
- 2012 La Terre outragée (Land of Oblivion) (108 minutes), as director and screenwriter, drama set in Pripyat exploring the Chernobyl disaster and its aftermath, premiered at the Venice Film Festival, French/German/Polish/Ukraine co-production.
- 2021 The Forgotten Ones (93 minutes) as director and screenwriter, documentary, Michale Boganim follows the footsteps of her father, who came from Morocco and quickly became a leader of the local Israeli Black Panthers to stand against this discrimination. Giornate degli Autori 2021 – Venice (World Premiere), Cinemed 2021 (French Premiere), Doc NYC 2021 (North American Premiere), CPH:Dox 2022
- 2023 Tel Aviv Beirut (116 minutes) as director and screenwriter, historical drama set against the backdrop of the Israeli-Lebanese conflict in 1982 and 2006 – Premiered at Tokyo International Film Festival
