= High Heat (film) =

2022 film directed by Zach Golden

- Film poster
- Directed by: Zach Golden
- Screenplay by: James Pedersen
- Produced by: Zola Elgart Glassman; Jesse Korman; Jordan Beckerman; Jordan Yale Levine
- Starring: Olga Kurylenko; Dallas Page; Dylan Flashner; Ivan Martin; Chris Diamantopoulos; Kaitlin Doubleday; Jackie Long; Bianca D'Ambrosio; Chiara D'Ambrosio; Don Johnson
- Cinematography: Adam Lee
- Edited by: Dawson Taylor
- Music by: Max Di Carlo
- Production company: Yale Productions
- Distributed by: Saban Films
- Release date: December 16, 2022 (United States)
- Running time: 84 minutes
- Country: United States
- Language: English

High Heat is a 2022 action film directed by Zach Golden with a screenplay written by James Pedersen. The film stars Olga Kurylenko and Don Johnson. The film was released on December 16, 2022, both in theaters and on streaming platforms.

== Synopsis ==
Ray and Ana, husband and wife, own and operate a restaurant together on their opening night. Both of them are keeping secrets, however. Ray is in debt to the Mafia, while Ana is an ex-KGB agent. Both secrets are revealed when the Mafia sends people to kill Ray but Ana fights them off. Ray and Ana must work together to save their restaurant and their lives.

Dom, to whom Ray owes money, wants to set fire to the restaurant in order to collect the insurance money. He asks his son Mick to do the job and provides him with helpers. However, Ana is still in the restaurant and overpowers the helpers. Dom sends more helpers, kidnaps Ray, and confronts him, but Ray manages to escape. With the help of Ana's old friend Mimi and her husband Tom, they also overpower the soldiers Dom hired. Ray disguises himself as a soldier to approach Dom and is thus able to eliminate him with Ana's help.

== Cast ==
- Olga Kurylenko as Ana
- Don Johnson as Ray
- Kaitlin Doubleday as Mimi
- Chris Diamantopoulos as Tom
- Dallas Page as Dom
- Bianca D'Ambrosio as Becky
- Chiara D'Ambrosio as Kaitlyn
- Ivan Martin as Mick
- Jackie Long as Gary
- Dylan Flashner as Sebastian

== Production ==
In October 2021, it was announced that filming wrapped.

== Release ==
In March 2022, it was announced that the world rights to the film were acquired by Saban Films. The film was released in theaters and on Demand and on Digital on December 16, 2022.

== Reception ==
The film has a 64% rating on Rotten Tomatoes based on 11 reviews.

Josh Bell of Comic Book Resources praised Johnson's performance, calling it "a pleasant surprise amid the steady stream of forgettable action B-movies."

Joe Leydon of Variety gave the film a positive review, calling it "a hoot."

Julian Roman of MovieWeb also gave the film a positive review and wrote, "High Heat serves up wacky action-comedy like a fast food platter ... Hilarious supporting characters add entertainment value when the lean premise struggles. Decent gunplay coupled with slick fight scenes also bolster meager the narrative."
