= Mara (film) =

- Theatrical release poster
- Directed by: Clive Tonge
- Screenplay by: Jonathan Frank
- Story by: Clive Tonge; Jonathan Frank
- Produced by: Steven Schneider; Scott Mann; James Edward Barker; Myles Nestel; Craig Chapman; Jake Shapiro; Daniel Grodnik; Mary Aloe
- Starring: Olga Kurylenko; Craig Conway; Javier Botet
- Cinematography: Emil Topuzov
- Edited by: Ed Marx; Jessica N. Kehrhahn; Scott Mann
- Music by: James Edward Barker
- Production companies: Moon River Studios; Mann Made Films; A Brighter Headache; The Solution Entertainment Group; 120dB Films
- Distributed by: Saban Films
- Release date: September 7, 2018 (United States)
- Country: United States
- Language: English
- Budget: $5 million
- Box office: $661,769

Mara is a 2018 American supernatural horror film directed by Clive Tonge in his feature-length debut and written by Jonathan Frank. The film stars Olga Kurylenko as criminal psychologist Kate Fuller, who investigates the murder of a man and is haunted by the eponymous demon (Javier Botet) who kills people in their sleep. The film also stars Craig Conway. Tonge and Frank based the film's story on conditions and mythology surrounding both sleep paralysis and Brugada syndrome. The film was released by Saban Films on September 7, 2018. It received negative reviews from critics and was a box office bomb.

== Plot ==
Sophie Wynsfield is awakened by her mother Helena, screaming, supposedly after murdering her husband. Criminal psychologist Kate Fuller (Olga Kurylenko), is called by Detective McCarthy to diagnose Helena. Helena and Sophie both insist that Mr. Wynsfield was killed by the sleep demon, Mara. Kate signs to have Helena committed to a mental institute.

The next day, Kate visits a man named Takahashi, only to find his decayed corpse, killed in the same manner as Mr. Wynsfield. Kate talks to McCarthy, who dismisses the Mara legend. Visiting Helena, Kate learns of Dougie, whom she met in a Sleep Paralysis support group. Helena insists she will be killed Mara, showing a red mark in her left eye, which signifies Mara's victim's death.

Kate attends the Sleep Paralysis support group run by Dr. Ellis and meets Dougie, who says Mara is real and will kill another man named Saul. He removes Saul's sunglasses, revealing his eyes to be completely red. Later that night, Saul commits suicide by self-immolation. Dougie is brought in as a suspect, but is release as there is no evidence.

Kate goes to the institution to have Helena released, only to find her dead and red-eyed. She watches the surveillance footage in Helena room, which shows a dark figure on top of Helena, strangling her. After several nights of waking up from sleep paralysis and seeing a figure in her apartment, Kate finds out she is marked herself.

Kate visits Dougie, whose left eye has turned red. He explains Mara's history and that her cycle begins following a tragedy. Her curse works in stages: 1. The victim is paralyzed, and briefly sees her; 2. The victim is marked; 3. Physical contact; 4. The victim sees her when awake, and will die when they fall asleep. The mark on the victims eyes show which stages they are at. Dougie believes the curse progresses when the victim is in a deep sleep. Thus, he only sleeps in brief intervals, waking himself with alarms and blaring music.

Kate goes to talk with Dr. Ellis, who disbelieves in Mara. Later that night, Dougie's generator dies, stopping his alarm clocks; at the same time, Mara places her hands around Kate's neck, pushing her to stage 3.

Dougie calls Kate, informing her he is on stage 4. Kate takes him to Dr. Ellis, who keep him in a special room to be monitored and give him an anesthetic to make him sleep. He reveals that he accidentally killed innocent people while in the war. That night, Mara kills Dougie. She also turns Kate's left eye completely red before Dr. Ellis pulls her from the paralysis.

McCarthy and Kate learn that Sophie is also suffering from Mara, already in the fourth stage. Determined to stop Mara, Kate returns to Dougie's shack and makes a graph of all the victims, attempting to put together the link between them. After finding Dougie's war memorabilia, she begins to put the pieces together: Dougie's killing innocents in the war, Saul's causing his mother's death, Mr. Wynsfeld's affair, Helena blaming herself for their divorce, and Kate blaming herself for Helena's death. McCarthy reveals that Takahashi was a chef at a primary school, and caused 38 kids to die by ingesting contaminated fish. Sophie blames herself for Helena's incarceration. Kate realizes the link: Mara targets people overcome with guilt over things they've done.

Kate attempts to reach the hospital to save Sophie. After falling asleep, she enters the fourth stage (both eyes completely red) and begins to see Mara while awake. At the hospital, she finds Sophie in sleep paralysis and attempts to wake her while trying to keep Mara from killing her. Mara suddenly disappears and the redness disappears from Sophie's eyes. Sophie explains she never blamed Kate for her mother. After deeming her safe, Kate falls asleep. When she awakes, she is confronted by Helena blaming Kate for her death; Kate hasn't let go of her guilt. Kate awakens in sleep paralysis, and the movie ends with Mara lunging at her.

== Cast ==
- Olga Kurylenko as Kate Fuller, a criminal psychologist
- Craig Conway as Dougie
- Javier Botet as Mara
- Lance E. Nichols as McCarthy
- Mackenzie Imsand as Sophie
- Jacob Grodnik as Josh
- Ted Johnson as Grandpa
- Mitch Eakins as Ellis
- Melissa Bolona as Carly
- Marcus W. Weathersby as Saul
- Dandy Barrett as Dr. Botet

== Production ==
The film was announced to be in development in November 2013 at the American Film Market with Olga Kurylenko attached to star, Clive Tonge set to make his directorial debut, and Jonathan Frank hired to write the screenplay, based on an original story created by Tonge and Frank. Producers Myles Nestel and Steven Schneider stated their intention to have the film begin an "Insidious-type film franchise". The film was set to begin principal photography in May 2014. Filming wrapped in May 2016 in Savannah, Georgia, and the filmmakers were searching for a distributor at the 2016 Cannes Film Festival that month.

== Release ==
Mara was released on September 7, 2018, with a limited theatrical run and video on demand release planned.

== Reception ==
On Rotten Tomatoes the film has 28% approval rating based on 18 reviews, with an average rating of 4.3/10.

Dennis Harvey of Variety called a film "[a] shrill and uninspired horror opus", while Noel Murray called it "a poky thriller that - eventually - delivers some decent scares". Frank Scheck of The Hollywood Reporter said that the film is "sleep-inducing", with Peter Bradshaw of The Guardian giving Mara 2 out of 5, calling it "by-the-numbers stuff" in his closing comments.

== See also ==
- Dead Awake, a 2016 film
