= Camille Montes =

Fictional character in the James Bond film Quantum of Solace

- James Bond character
- Olga Kurylenko as Camille
- First appearance: Quantum of Solace (2008)
- Portrayed by: Olga Kurylenko

In-universe information
- Full name: Camille Montes Rivero
- Gender: Female
- Occupation: Bolivian Intelligence
- Nationality: Bolivian
- Family: Ernesto Montes (father); Unnamed mother (Russian)
- Classification: Bond girl

Camille Montes Rivero is a fictional character in the 2008 James Bond film Quantum of Solace portrayed by actress Olga Kurylenko.

== Role ==
Camille Montes is a Bolivian national. She first meets James Bond (Daniel Craig) in Haiti, where she intends to kill General Luiz Medrano (Joaquin Cosío), who murdered her entire family when she was a child. She sleeps with Dominic Greene (Mathieu Amalric), a member of the terrorist group Quantum, to get to Medrano, but Greene soon grows suspicious of her and plots to kill her.

Camille arranges a meeting with a geologist selling classified information that is detrimental to Greene's front company, Greene Planet. However, Greene has already hired assassin Edmund Slate (Neil Jackson) to pose as the geologist (whom Camille has not met in person) and kill Camille. Bond intercepts and eliminates Slate, taking his suitcase without knowledge of its contents. Camille sees Bond with the suitcase and mistakenly thinks he is the geologist. When Bond opens the suitcase, he unintentionally reveals Slate's gun and documents, indicating Camille as a target. Thinking Bond intends to kill her, Camille tries to shoot him and escapes. She later discovers Greene's betrayal, prompting Bond to rescue her. Together, they join forces to pursue Greene and Medrano.

Bond leaves Camille for a short period of time after she is knocked unconscious during a boat chase in Haiti to follow Greene to Austria, tracking him to a performance of Tosca. Camille soon appears at Greene's formal fundraising party to ruin it. Greene attempts to push her from a balcony but, once again, Bond saves her life.

Bond intervenes and takes her away from Greene, using MI6 Agent Strawberry Fields (Gemma Arterton) as a distraction, to prevent Greene's associate from following Bond and Camille as they leave the party; this costs Fields her life. Camille watches Bond as he kills Bolivian police officers as revenge for murdering his friend and ally René Mathis (Giancarlo Giannini).

Camille and Bond track Greene and Medrano to a desert eco-hotel. While Bond goes to fight Greene and his men, Camille faces Medrano, who attempts to rape and kill her. Camille gains the advantage and eliminates the dictator with a single shot to the head. Amidst the collapsing hotel, Bond protects Camille from the fire and assists her in escaping. Bond leaves Greene stranded in the desert, then drives Camille to a train station for her journey home. Before parting ways, they share a brief kiss, and Camille wishes Bond success in overcoming his demons.

== Production ==
Barbara Broccoli said that she intended for Camille to return for Skyfall or a future film. The character did not appear in Skyfall, however, nor the subsequent Bond films, Spectre and No Time to Die.

== Reception ==
Laureen Gibson argued that Montes is "arguably a female version of Bond rather than a Bond girl." Gibson goes on to point out that her mission was accomplished first, whereas in previous Bond films, "women's individual missions were secondary to or subsumed by Bond's." Montes is also a rarity in that she does not have sex with Bond.

Chicago Sun-Times film critic Roger Ebert, who was critical of Quantum of Solace as a whole, compared Montes unfavorably to the more colorful Bond girls of previous films in the series, such as Goldfinger's Pussy Galore, GoldenEye's Xenia Onatopp, and Diamonds Are Forever's Plenty O'Toole.
