= John Beck Hofmann =

American film director

John Beck Hofmann (born March 27, 1969) is an American director, cinematographer, composer and actor. He is sometimes credited as John Beck.

== Background ==
John Beck-Hofmann was born in Omaha, Nebraska, and moved to Pasadena, California in 1991. He currently lives in Omaha, Nebraska

== Early career ==
In addition to his cinematic contributions for multiple television programs on the Public Broadcasting Service (PBS), Discovery Channel, Science Channel and National Geographic, he has served as stage manager for Geraldo Rivera from 1999 - 2003 for both CNBC and Fox networks as well as for other CNBC/FOX hosts such as Chris Matthews and Greta Van Susteren.

== Current work ==
He currently serves as a director of photography for NASA's Jet Propulsion Laboratory in Pasadena, California. His work has appeared in the IMAX feature film Roving Mars, James Cameron's Aliens of the Deep, and NOVA's "Mars: Dead or Alive?" and "Welcome to Mars".

His more recent cinematography work can be seen in the National Geographic program "Five Years on Mars", which won an Emmy in 2009 for outstanding science and technology programming. His 1999 documentary on the Mars Pathfinder Mission, "The Pathfinders", won a Gold Plaque award at the Chicago International Film Festival by Intercom.

Beck-Hofmann is currently producing and directing several documentaries for NASA/JPL. His current video series project called "The Martians", is a web series, following people from around the world, who work on activities related to our journey to Mars. "The Martians" can be seen at: The Martians. Hofmann has also published a number of videos in his Youtube page, including "7 Minutes of Terror", which describes the atmospheric entry, descent and landing of the Mars Science Laboratory rover, scheduled for August 2012, and features several engineers from NASA's Jet Propulsion Laboratory involved in the MSL project.

Beck-Hofmann's dramatic television work includes conspiracy thriller Tyranny, a web series plays on Koldcast and Tyranny.tv. Tyranny was accepted as part of the official selection of the Geneva International Film Festival in 2010. Tyranny also received four nominations for: sound design, soundtrack, best looking show and best thriller.

Beck-Hofmann produced controversial conspiracy documentary "Maidan massacre" (2014) about the protests in Ukraine, Euromaidan.

Some of John's current work and body of work is discussed in a recent podcast by Gulf Coast Studios. From Almost Fired to Filmmaker: John Beck-Hofmann’s Untold Hollywood Story // Production Playbook

== Music ==
Beck-Hofmann has played in several bands: SnoGlobe (1994–1996) and Terminal-3 (1999–2001). He has also created music used in multiple television shows, such as FX's "Nip/Tuck", MTV's "The Real World", Travel Channel's "Eye of the Beholder" and multiple NASA documentaries. He composed the original score for the ongoing conspiracy thriller Tyranny the Series.

Beck-Hofmann currently lives in Hollywood, California.
