= Hawes Craven =

English painter

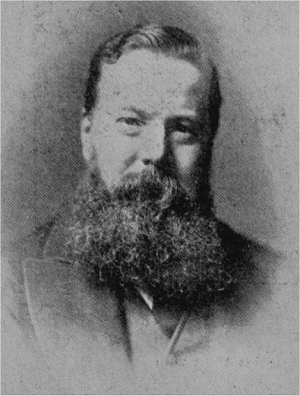
Hawes Craven

Henry Hawes Craven Green (3 July 1837 – 22 July 1910) was an English theatre scene-painter. He collaborated with Henry Irving, Richard D'Oyly Carte and Herbert Beerbohm Tree, producing stage sets of unprecedented realism. Craven's career lasted from 1853 to 1905, spanning the end of the era of gas lighting in theatres and the beginning of electrical lighting; he developed new techniques to co-ordinate the appearance of theatre settings during the transition from gas to electricity. He was regarded as the finest scene-painter of his day and was the last major scenic designer in the ultra-realistic tradition.

== Biography ==
=== Early years ===
Craven was born in Leeds, the son of theatrical parents. His father, James Green (d. 1881), was a comedian and pantomimist, who had previously been an innkeeper. His mother, Elizabeth, née Craven (1802 or 1803–1866), was an actress, who left the stage, and published several volumes of prose and verse. He performed with his father as a youth, shortening his name to Hawes Craven. However, his aptitude for painting led him to apply for a place at the Government School of Design at Marlborough House, London. He studied there from 1851 to 1853, winning many prizes. On leaving, he was a taken on as an apprentice by John Gray, scene-painter of the Britannia Theatre, Hoxton, London. When Gray moved to the Olympic Theatre, Craven moved with him. In 1857 he had his first success, when Gray was ill and Craven did the work on a set depicting the Eddystone lighthouse for Wilkie Collins's The Lighthouse. He worked from a painting by a well-known seascape artist, Clarkson Stanfield, with such fidelity that Stanfield presented him with the original painting.

In the late 1850s and early 1860s, Craven worked at the Theatre Royal, Drury Lane on pantomimes, and at the Royal Opera House, Covent Garden on operas. His first post as chief scene-painter was at the Theatre Royal, Dublin, from 1862 to 1864. In London, during the rest of the 1860s, Craven was an assistant at the Lyceum, Olympic and Adelphi theatres. In June 1866 he married a dancer, Mary Elizabeth Watson Tees (1838–1891). There were three sons and three daughters of the marriage.

=== Lyceum and Savoy theatres ===
Craven's scenery for Ivanhoe, 1891

In 1871 Craven became principal scene-painter at the Lyceum Theatre, a role he held for the next thirty years, first as an employee and later as a freelance artist. At first he worked under the management of H. L. Bateman, and then Bateman's widow. Despite early success with his scenery for the melodrama The Bells, in which Henry Irving made his name, Craven's opportunities were restricted until Irving became lessee and manager of the Lyceum in 1878. Craven, with Irving's support, carried scenic realism and stage illusion to new levels.

For some productions, Irving commissioned designs from well-known painters, which Craven would then re-create as scenery. These artists included Ford Madox Brown, Edward Burne-Jones and Lawrence Alma-Tadema. For other productions, Craven created the original designs as well as executing them. For his scenes in Irving's 1888 production of Faust, he visited Nuremberg and the Harz mountains "with admirable results." Irving became well known for his Shakespeare productions, for which Craven painted strongly naturalistic scenery, which won critical applause and occasionally threatened to outshine the performers. His productions included Hamlet (1874 and 1878), The Merchant of Venice (1879), Romeo and Juliet (1882), Macbeth (1888), King Henry VIII (1892), King Lear (1892), Cymbeline (1895), and Coriolanus (1902). By the mid-1880s, Craven was recognised as among the élite of his art. The theatrical newspaper The Era wrote, "In the art of scene painting England stands paramount. Neither Paris, not Germany, nor New York can commence to approach, let alone rival, the work of the men who furnish London with its stage scenery. Such men as … Hawes Craven … are artists in the truest and best sense of the word."

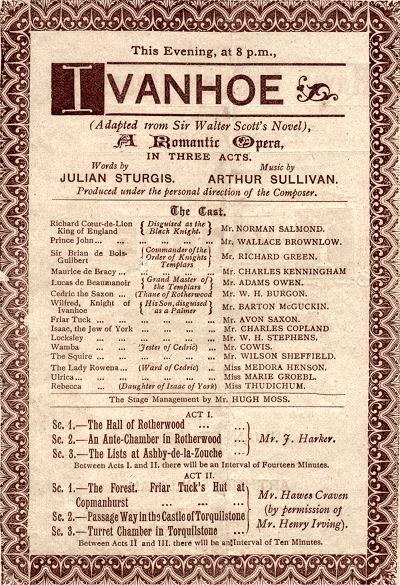
Programme crediting Craven's sets for Ivanhoe

For Richard D'Oyly Carte, Craven painted the scenery for seven of the Savoy operas. Carte's new theatre, the Savoy, built in 1881, was lit by electricity, unlike the Lyceum, which remained gas-lit for some years. Craven adjusted his techniques to match the stronger light produced by electric bulbs. For the Savoy, Craven painted scenery for Princess Ida (1884), The Mikado (1885), Ruddigore (1887), a revival of H.M.S. Pinafore (1887), The Yeomen of the Guard (1888), The Gondoliers (1890) and Utopia, Limited (1893). Settings for these works ranged from a mediaeval Hungarian castle to a Japanese garden, the interior of a picture gallery, a Royal Naval ship modelled on H.M.S. Victory, the Tower of London, the Piazzetta in Venice, and a South Sea island. Also for Carte, Craven designed and painted scenery for Arthur Sullivan's grand opera, Ivanhoe, at the Royal English Opera House in 1891.

=== Later years ===
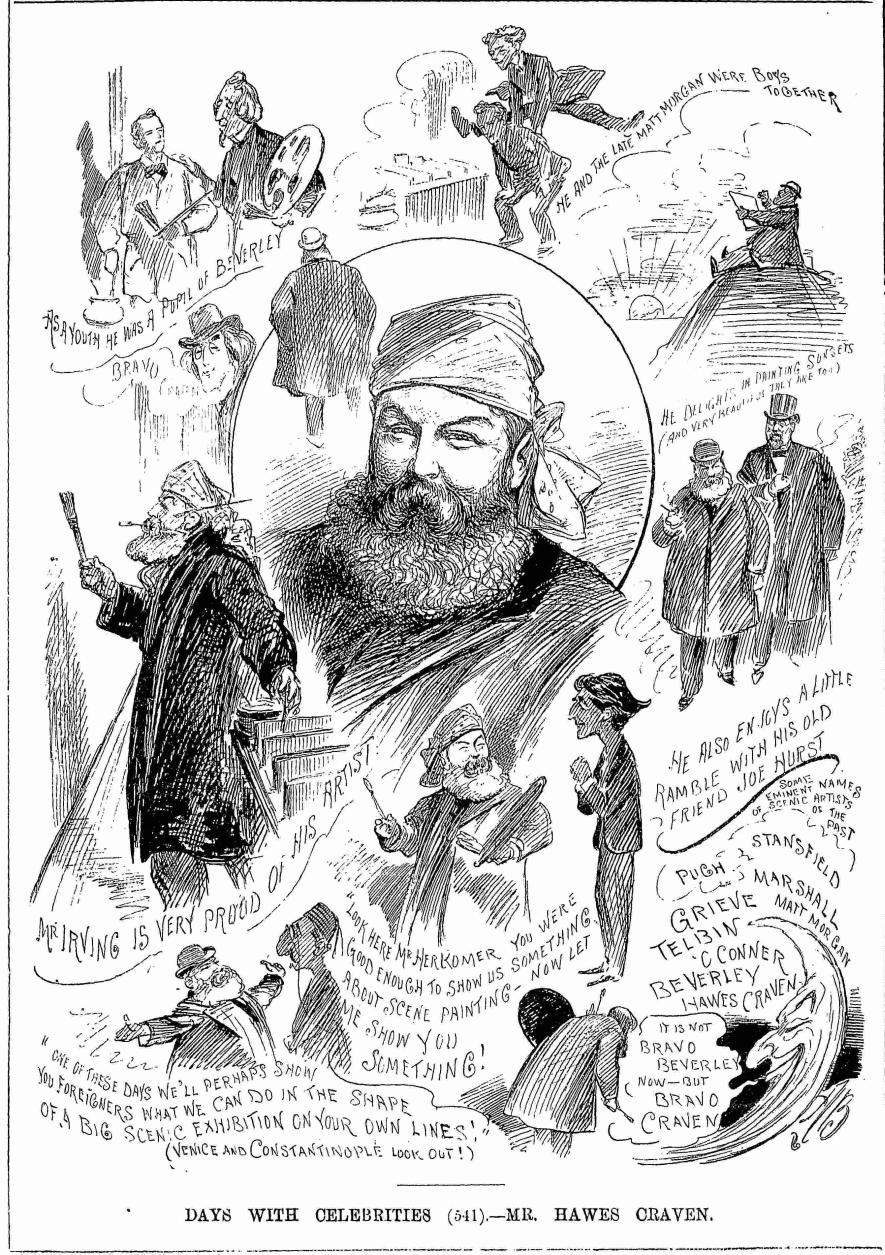
1894 cartoons of Craven

The pinnacle of theatrical realism was reached, with Craven's help, by Herbert Beerbohm Tree at Her Majesty's Theatre. Craven painted sets for stagings that famously included live rabbits running about in the forest scenes of As You Like It. Craven's last substantial work was the scenery for Arthur Bourchier's revival of The Merchant of Venice at the Garrick Theatre in October 1905. In the same year he was elected president of the Scenic Artists' Association. Craven was the last great practitioner of stage realism. In its obituary notice, The Manchester Guardian wrote, "The most gifted scene-painters of the coming generation will probably try to suggest more and state less, to give symbols rather than imitations of nature."

Craven died of bronchitis at his home in south London on 22 July 1910, at the age of 73. Obituary tributes in the newspapers declared him to have been "the greatest of English scene-painters, and perhaps the finest scene-painter who has ever lived" (The Manchester Guardian), whose "scenes were real pictures, with the atmosphere and charm of fine paintings" (The Standard).
