= Frederick Bovill =

British opera singer

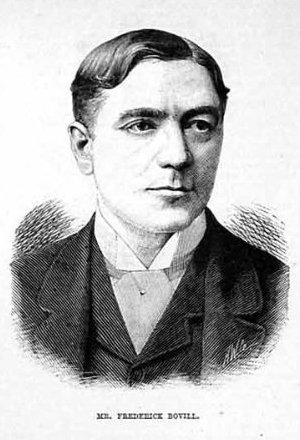
Frederick Bovill in 1885

Frederick Anderson Bovill (6 August 1860 – 16 November 1933) was an English operatic baritone of the late Victorian era and a pickle merchant. In his short operatic career, he created the roles of Pish-Tush in Gilbert and Sullivan's comic opera hit The Mikado (1885) and the Squire in Sullivan's romantic opera Ivanhoe (1891). From 1887 to 1889 Bovill toured the British provinces with J. W. Turner's English Opera Company. His last sustained role was in La Basoche (1881–1882).

== Life and career ==
Bovill, according to the researches of the theatre writer Kurt Gänzl appears to have been born in St John's Wood and, in addition to his operatic career, carried on the trade of a pickle merchant, or at least Ganzl identifies him as the same person with these dates of birth and death who consistently identified his career as "merchant", even during the period when Bovill was professionally engaged in opera. He and his wife had three children, and after his singing career, he returned to pickle making and selling.

=== The Mikado ===
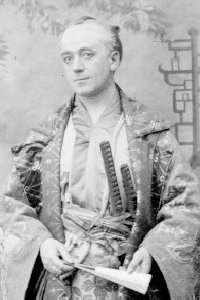
As Pish-Tush in The Mikado (1885)

In the original production of The Mikado by Gilbert and Sullivan at London's Savoy Theatre (1885–1887), Bovill joined the D'Oyly Carte Opera Company, where he originated the supporting role of the nobleman Pish-Tush. As part of the role, it was intended that Bovill should sing the bottom line in the madrigal "Brightly dawns our wedding day", which includes a bottom F. Bovill, however, was unable to produce this note with sufficient sonority, so shortly after the opera premiered, the character of Go-To, another "Noble Lord", was created to sing the bass line in this number (and to speak an introductory line of dialogue); Rudolph Lewis was cast in this role, while Bovill continued to play the rest of the role of Pish-Tush throughout the run.

The critic of the Illustrated Sporting and Dramatic News commented: "Mr. Frederick Bouvill (sic) is a trifle heavy as Pish Tush, but has a very good voice and knows how to make use of it". The Theatre stated: "Mr. Bovill (the other recruit) proved an excellent representative of the "general utility" noble Lord, Pish-Tush. This gentleman possesses a fine mellow voice, which he produces very agreeably, and is in all respects an acquisition to the Savoy company. In another review later in the run of the show, the Illustrated Sporting and Dramatic News said, "Mr. Frederic Bovill cannot boast a very long professional career. After some experience as an amateur he made his debut in The Mikado, taking the part of the Noble Lord Pish-Tush. Without a very great deal to do, he makes the best of his part, and his excellent voice and artistic singing are heard to advantage."

=== Later roles ===
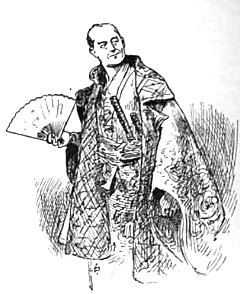
As Pish-Tush in The Mikado (1885)

In Gilbert and Sullivan's next production, Ruddigore, there was only one principal lyric baritone role in the cast, and Bovill was released from the D'Oyly Carte Opera Company. From 1887 to 1889 Bovill toured the British provinces with J. W. Turner's English Opera Company as Danny Mann in The Lily of Killarney, Count Arnheim in The Bohemian Girl, Don José de Santarém in Maritana and as Count di Luna in Il trovatore, appearing at Her Majesty's Theatre in Dundee, the York Theatre Royal and the Theatre Royal in Oldham among other venues. The critic of The Evening Telegraph in Dundee said of Bovill's performance in Maritana:

"He has undoubtedly a baritone voice of excellent timbre and is a pleasing and effective actor, but he deliberately destroys all pleasure the ear should derive from his voice by a persistent tremolo that is most annoying to listen to. If it is a natural defect no more need be said; if it is done for effect it is decidedly bad taste."

In The Stage in 1889 he advertised himself as: "Mr. Frederick Bovill. Principal Baritone, Grand Opera. Count di Luna, Valentine, Count Arnheim, Don José de Satiterun, Don Pedro, Danny Mann, &c. Mr. N. Vert, Cork-street, W." He also toured with the Henry Walsham Opera company. In 1891 Bovill again created a role in an Arthur Sullivan opera, the Squire in Ivanhoe, at the new Royal English Opera House.

His final sustained role on the London stage was the Chancellor in La Basoche by André Messager (November 1891 to January 1892) at the Royal English Opera House, In May 1892 he took part in a recital at the Steinway Hall in London during which he sang "Time was when Love and I were well acquainted" from The Sorcerer and "Ho, Jolly Jenkin" from Ivanhoe, the latter being encored. He played Tom Ball in a single matinee performance of the operetta A Hundred Years Ago by Alec Nelson at the Royalty Theatre in July 1892. The critic of The Era wrote: "Mr Frederick Bovill acted and sang with all the ease and certainty of intonation that are expected from so experienced an artist."

In the film Topsy-Turvy (1999) he was portrayed by Michael Simkins.
