= T. E. Collcutt =

English architect (1840–1924)

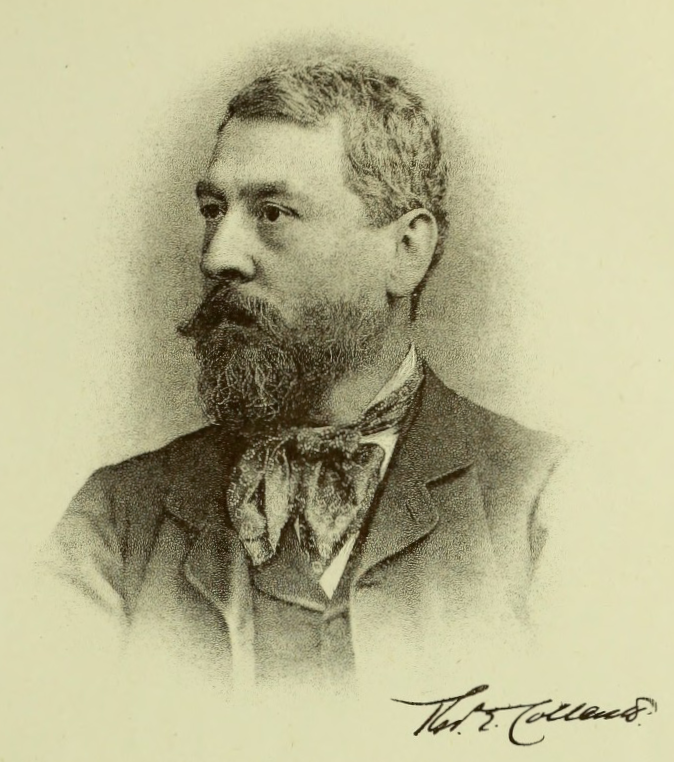
Thomas Edward Collcutt c.1890

Thomas Edward Collcutt (16 March 1840 – 7 October 1924) was an English architect in the Victorian era who designed several important buildings in London including the Savoy Hotel, Lloyd's Register of Shipping and the Palace Theatre.

== Early life ==
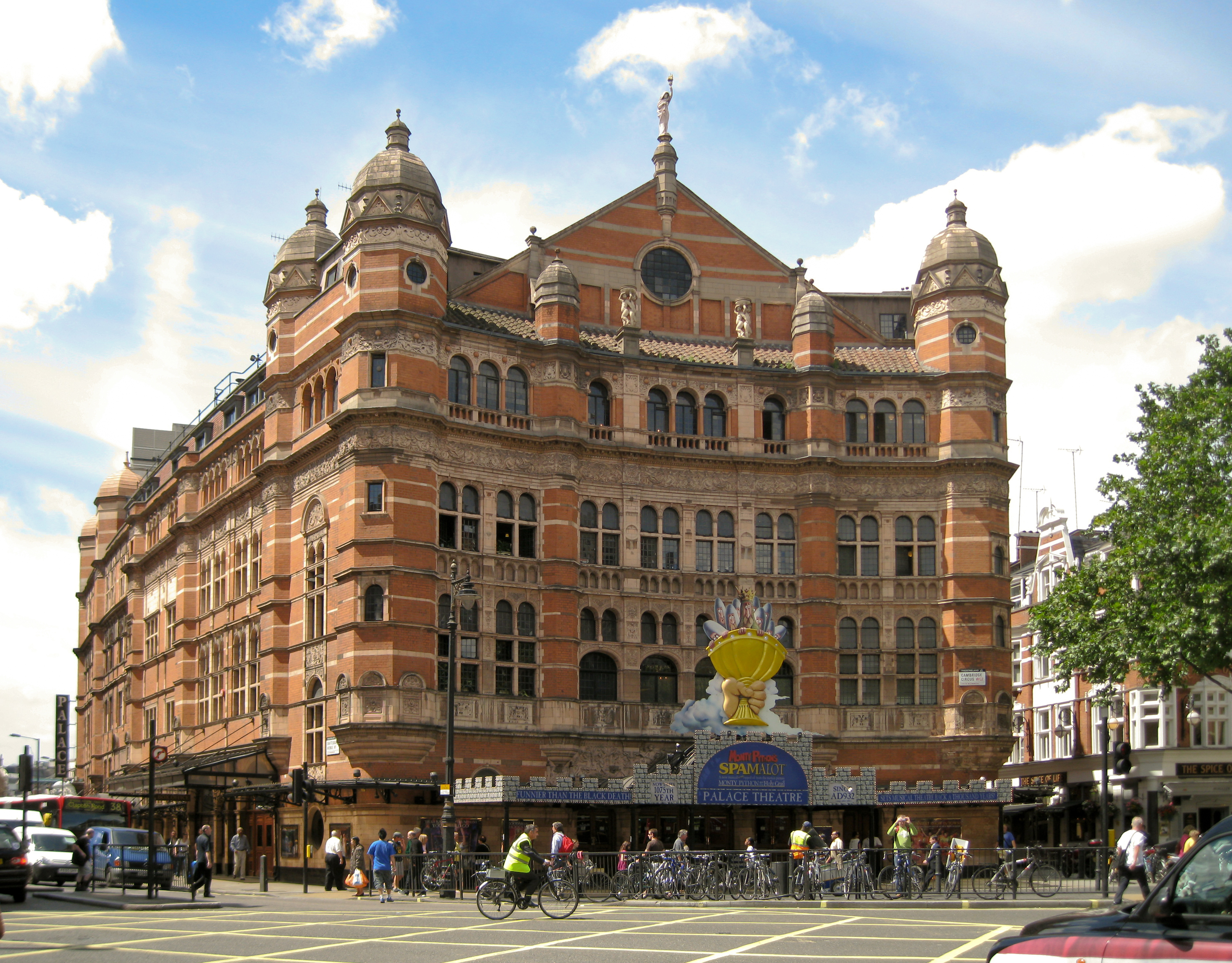
The Palace Theatre, London

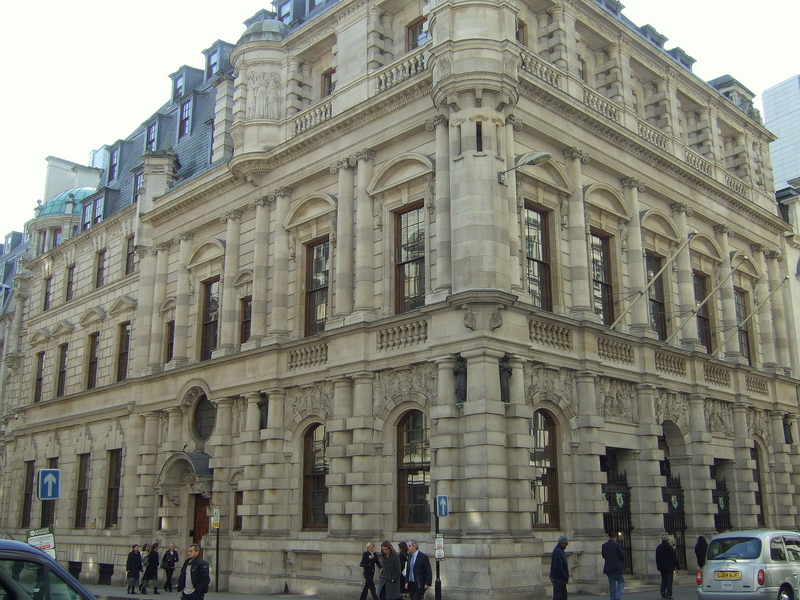
Lloyd's Register of Shipping

Collcutt was born in Oxford, England, the son of James Collcutt, a servant at St John's College, and his wife, Emma, née Blake. He attended the Oxford Diocesan School.

== Career ==
Collcutt was apprenticed to the London architect R. E. Armstrong, and then employed by the partnership Miles and Murgatroyd. He began working in the establishment of George Edmund Street, with Richard Norman Shaw, before setting up his own practice in 1873 and achieving recognition, winning the Wakefield Town Hall competition in 1877, the Grand Prix for Architecture at the Paris International Exposition in 1889, and the Royal Gold Medal in 1902. He was a Fellow of the Royal Institute of British Architects, and served as its president from 1906 to 1908. He was a member of the Société Centrale d’Architecture de Belgique, and the Société des Artistes Français.

His most important building in London was the Imperial Institute (1887–93), of which only the central tower remains, now part of Imperial College. In 1899 Collcutt designed the Lloyd's Register of Shipping Building in London, extensively decorated with allegorical sculpture by George Frampton and a major landmark of the New Sculpture movement.

For Richard D'Oyly Carte, Collcutt designed the Savoy Hotel, which has been subsequently altered, and the Palace Theatre, London (1889) in Cambridge Circus, Charing Cross Road, which was built as the Royal English Opera House. Sir Arthur Sullivan's grand opera, Ivanhoe, was the first production at the theatre. Collcutt also designed the Bechstein piano showrooms at 40 Wigmore Street (1889) and the Wigmore Hall (1901). The Palace Theatre and the Wigmore Hall remain essentially in their original forms. Both have strong pale buff terracotta ornamentation, characteristic of Collcutt's work.

== Royal Institute of British Architects ==
Both as president of the Royal Institute of British Architects (1906–1908), and later, the causes he promoted included a scheme to move Charing Cross railway terminus to the south bank of the Thames, and another to improve housing conditions for the working classes by replacing slums with towers of flats eight or ten storeys high.

== Death ==
Collcutt died in Southampton on 7 October 1924 at the age of 84.

== Gallery ==
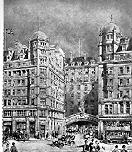
The Savoy Hotel in 1911

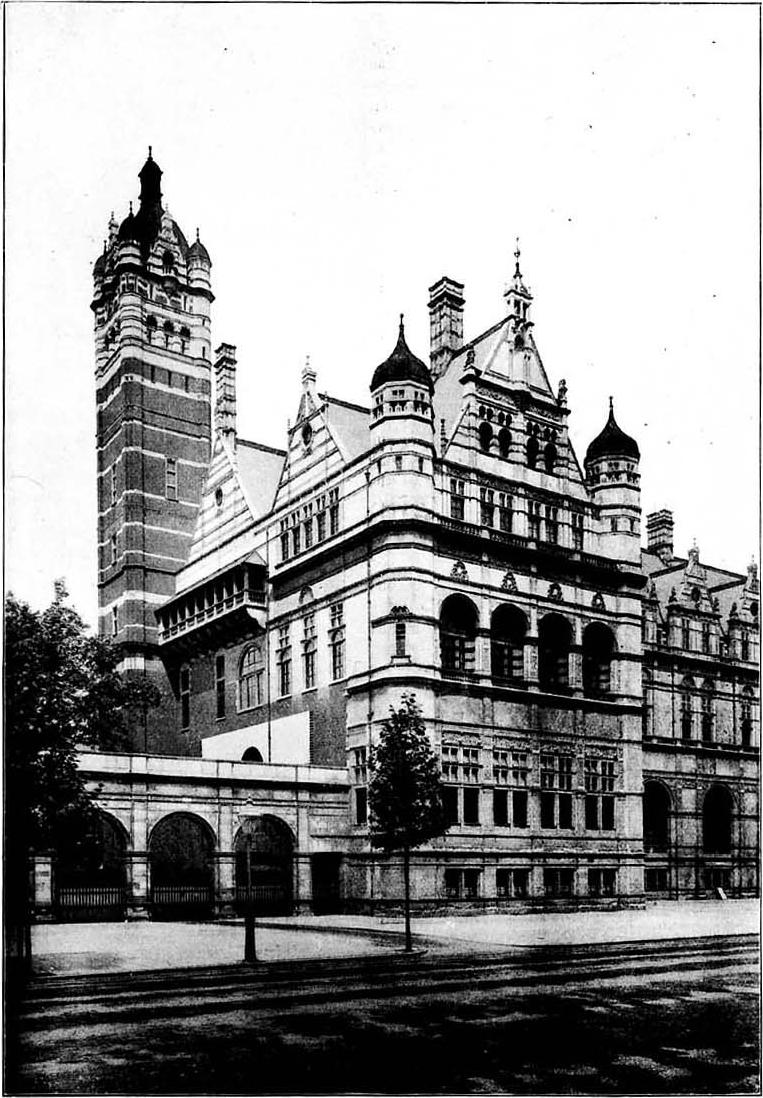
Imperial Institute, demolished apart from the tower

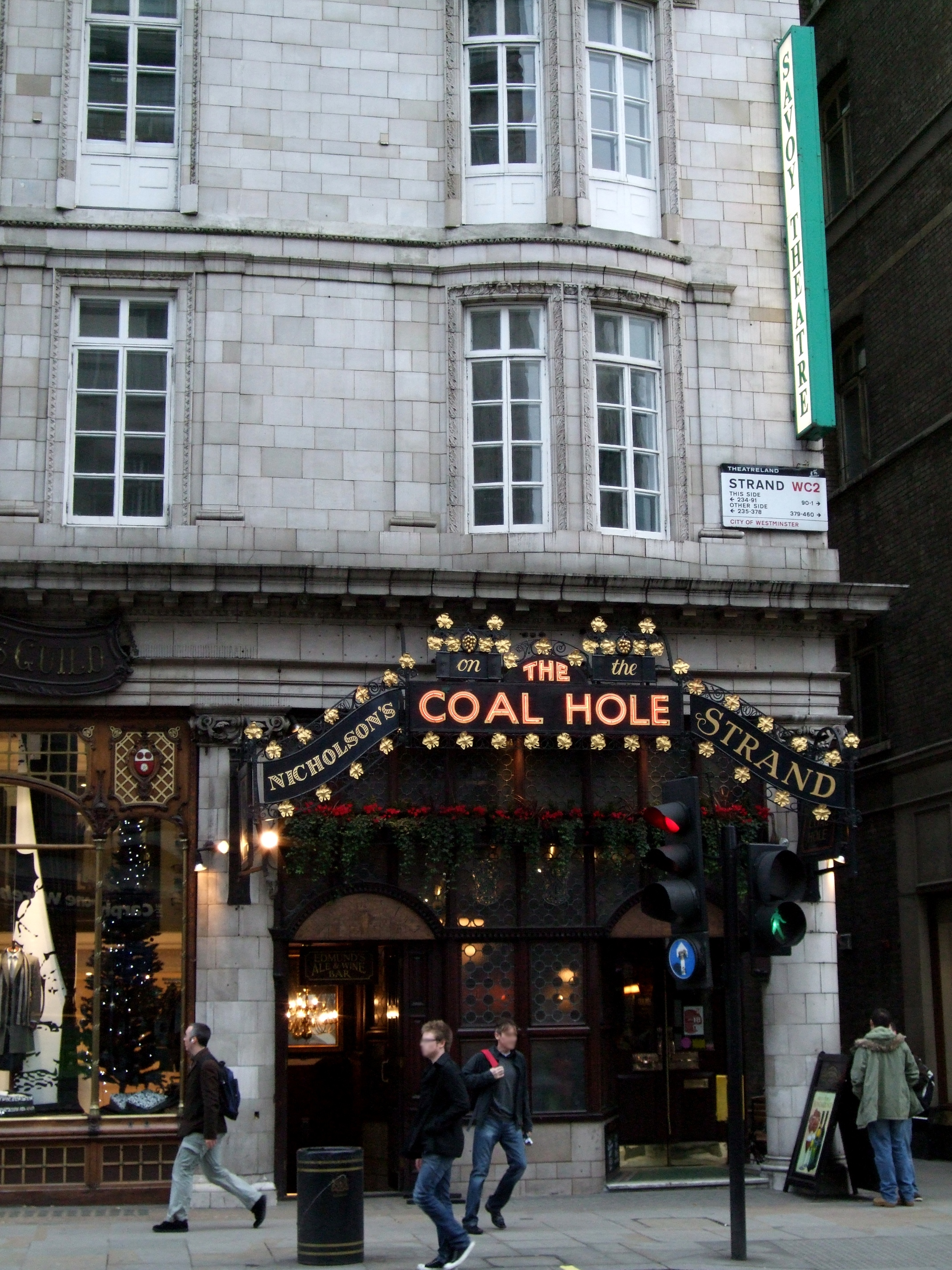
The Coal Hole

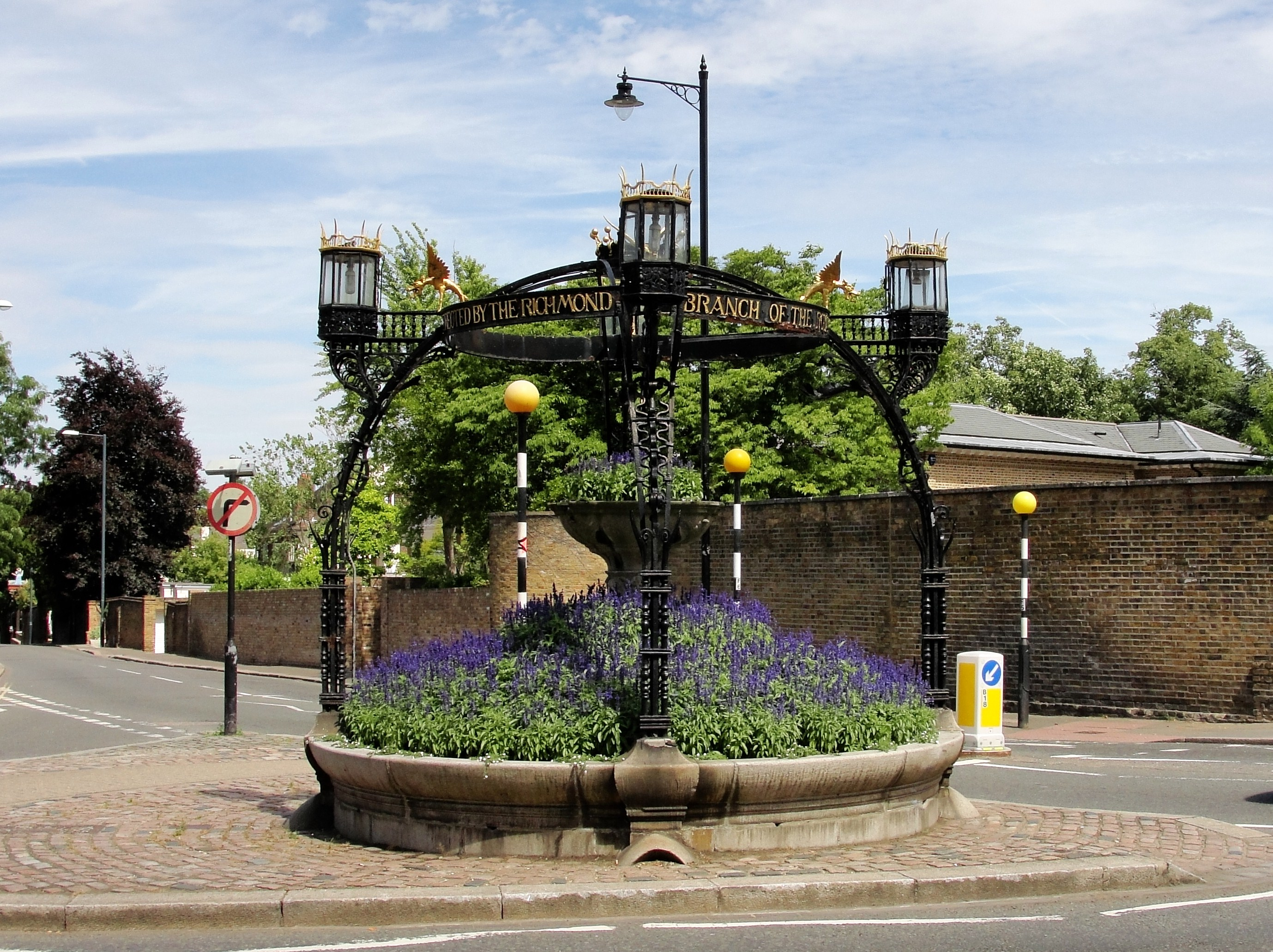
Monument for the prevention of cruelty to animals, Richmond Hill

== Notes ==
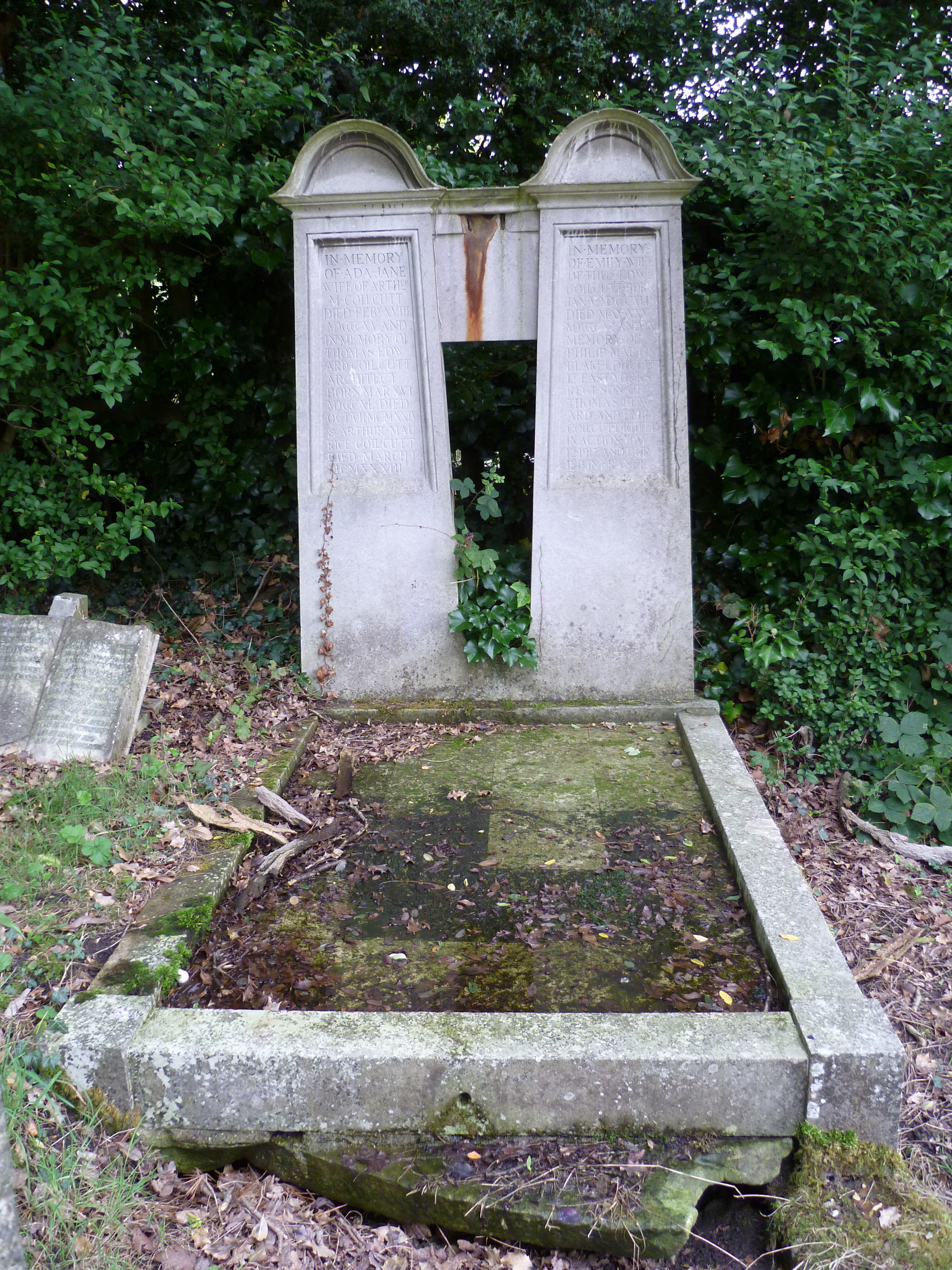
The Collcutt family grave at St Andrew's church, Totteridge.
