= José Quintero Theatre =

- Martin R. Kaufman Theatre; The Seven Sisters; Chicago City Limits Theatre; Sleepy Owl Club
- Interactive map of José Quintero Theatre
- Address: 534 West 42nd Street; New York City; United States
- Coordinates: 40°45′36.3″N 73°59′49.4″W
- Owner: Angelina Fiordellisi
- Capacity: 93
- Type: Off-off-Broadway

Construction
- Demolished: 2006
- Years active: 1923-2006

The José Quintero Theatre was an off-off-Broadway theater located in Hell's Kitchen, Manhattan, New York City. The 93-seat theatre existed inside a former brownstone house that was constructed in 1887. In 1923 the building was converted to a nightclub, the Sleepy Owl Club, which operated until 1954. The theatre was used as a comedy venue during the 1960s and 1970s. In 1980 it was purchased by Linda Gelman and Paul Zuckerman of the improvisational theatre company Chicago City Limits, and opened as the Chicago City Limits Theatre that summer.

Producer Martin R. Kaufman purchased the theatre in 1987, and it operated as the Martin R. Kaufman Theatre until Kaufman's death in 1996. The Kaufman Theatre opened with a celebrated revival of Cole Porter's Gay Divorce in March 1987; a production which earned actor Joaquin Romaguera a nomination for the Drama Desk Award for Outstanding Featured Actor in a Musical. The Kaufman Theatre was host to several plays, musicals, and cabaret events; including performances featuring Kaye Ballard, Tallulah Bankhead, Wesla Whitfield, Julie Wilson, Steve Ross, and Jo Sullivan Loesser.

In September 1998 the theatre was purchased by actress and producer Angelina Fiordellisi who rechristened the theatre as The Seven Sisters. After the death of Circle in the Square Theatre founder José Quintero, the theatre was renamed the José Quintero Theatre in his honor on May 2, 2000. In 2006 the theatre was demolished and replaced by a neo-brutalist residential building.
