= John Blackburn (artist) =

British abstract painter (1932–2022)

John Blackburn (2 June 1932 – 22 October 2022) was a British abstract painter, who, after critical success in the 1960s, fell into relative obscurity until the mid 2000s.

== Life ==
Blackburn was born in a village outside Luton and attended the Margate School of Art, where he studied textile design. After school, he served in the National Service (and later lived) in New Zealand, Malaysia, and the surrounding area from 1954 to 1962. In Auckland, New Zealand, he met his future wife, Maudie McKinnon. Soon after the couple married, they settled in Glenfield, New Zealand. It was in New Zealand that Blackburn started painting; he would paint in the garden, having become accustomed to the weather, but then later moved on to the North Shore. His paintings were exhibited at the Circle Gallery in Auckland, where a review on Ocula described his work as radical, characterized by simple, reduced forms in pure, unmixed colours.

In 1962, Blackburn, with his wife and three children, returned to Britain, where art collector and gallery owner Jim Ede saw his one-man show in London's Woodstock Gallery. Ede offered Blackburn a place in his Kettle's Yard gallery in Cambridge among artists including Peter Lanyon, William Scott, and Roger Hilton.

Soon after, Blackburn's ten-year-old daughter became ill and needed a kidney transplant. Blackburn volunteered, spending six months in intense physical training to prepare for the organ transplantation. The time spent before and after the successful surgery prompted Blackburn to drop from the public eye for a number of years.

In 2006, Blackburn had a show at the Metropole Galleries in Folkestone; his work had not appeared in a commercial gallery since 1968. Exhibitions followed in 2008, 2011, and 2012.

Blackburn died on 22 October 2022, after a short illness, at the age of 90. He was survived by his wife and children.

== Work ==
Blackburn's abstract paintings are held in the private collections of Paul Zuckerman and Natalia Grosvenor, Duchess of Westminster. In addition, his paintings are housed in university collections across Britain and Ireland, including Cambridge, Kent, Essex, Newcastle, and Trinity College Dublin. In 2008, he returned to Auckland for a show at the ARTIS Gallery entitled The Muriwai Paintings; this was followed by a show at the Osborne Samuel Gallery and Lemon Street Gallery in London in 2011. A 2012 show entitled And God cryed at the Studio 3 Gallery in Kent was a critical success.

== Style ==
Blackburn incorporated found objects and materials on his canvases, citing their "previous existence". His paintings utilize acrylic paint, oil paint, and encaustic, as well as resin, grit, house-paint, and varnish; according to a review of his 2015 show at the ARTIS Gallery, recent work "rides roughshod over any conventions of neatness and grace, using bold form, often black, and adorning his surface with found objects and collage." Blackburn described his work, "I suppose, that’s what my painting’s about; life itself is terribly dangerous, terribly cruel, terribly rewarding. All these things at once. This multi-faceted, wonderful jewel – which we all live with and die with – is there. We’re saddled with it, like it or not."
