= David Foster (Royal Navy officer) =

British Royal Navy pilot

- Born: David Ramsey Foster; 24 May 1920; London, England
- Died: 4 June 2010 (aged 90); Brimfield, Massachusetts, US
- Occupation(s): Royal Navy officer Business Executive
- Spouses: Glynis Johns (m. 1952; div. 1956) Anne Firth (m. 1957, divorced) Alexandra Chan (m. 1996)
- Children: 2
- Father: Robert Bagley Foster

David Ramsey Foster, DSO, DSC (24 May 1920 – 4 June 2010) was a British Royal Navy officer and businessman. He was a decorated pilot during World War II and president and chairman of Colgate-Palmolive. He was married to actress Glynis Johns.

== Early life and education ==
David Ramsey Foster was born on 24 May 1920 in London to American parents Robert Bagley Foster, an Olympian swimmer, and Josephine Pontius Foster (née Ramsey). His sister, Phoebe Louise Foster, married Lieutenant Osbert Stephen Boothby, the son of Commander William Osbert Boothby MVO RN, on 21 June 1938.

Foster was educated first at Stowe School and then at Gonville and Caius, Cambridge, where he studied economics and graduated in 1938.

== Career ==
Once World War II had come to an end, Lieutenant-Commander David Foster had served in both the Western Desert and the Pacific theatres, and had received both the DSO and DSC and Bar.

Foster joined Colgate-Palmolive after the war. He rose to become president in 1970 and chairman in 1975.

== Personal life ==
Foster married three times. On 1 February 1952 in Manhattan, New York, he married actress and divorcee Glynis Johns. They divorced on 17 May 1956 and on 2 August 1957 he married Anne Firth, with whom he had two daughters. Finally, he married Alexandra Chang on 24 May 1996.

He died on 4 June 2010 in Brimfield, Massachusetts.
