= Adolfo Pirelli =

Fictional character from Sweeney Todd: The Demon Barber of Fleet Street

- Sacha Baron Cohen as Adolfo Pirelli
- Portrayed by: Joaquin Romaguera (original 1979 Broadway cast); Donna Lynne Champlin (2005 Broadway revival); Sacha Baron Cohen (2007 film); Christian Borle (2014 concert); John Owen-Jones (2015 concert); Nicholas Christopher (2023 Broadway revival)

In-universe information
- Alias: Alfredo Pirelli / Alf Spiral (play); Daniel O'Higgins (musical); Davy Collins (film)
- Gender: Male
- Occupation: Barber and toothpuller (musical)
- Nationality: Irish (play); English (film); Claims to be Italian

Mr. Adolfo Pirelli (Signor Adolfo Pirelli in Italian), also known as Alf Spiral, Daniel O'Higgins or Davy Collins, is a fictional character from Stephen Sondheim's musical Sweeney Todd: The Demon Barber of Fleet Street. He is a supporting antagonist in the story and a rival barber to Sweeney Todd. He is eventually killed by Todd after he threatens him with extortion.

== Character overview ==
Pirelli is first introduced as an Italian barber, toothpuller, and snake oil salesman who is "all the rage" in Victorian London. He is very theatrical and dresses in extravagant clothing. Pirelli often abuses his young apprentice, Tobias Ragg, slapping him across the face for the slightest infraction, and often for no reason at all. Pirelli claims to have shaved the King of the Two Sicilies and the Pope, arrogantly referring to himself as "the King of the Barbers and the Barber of Kings".

His real name turns out to be Daniel O'Higgins ("Alf Spiral" in the original Christopher Bond play and "Davy Collins" in the film), and he was Sweeney Todd's apprentice as a boy. Pirelli knows Todd's true identity as Benjamin Barker and threatens to expose him unless Todd pays him half of his profits. Todd kills Pirelli in an effort to keep his identity a secret.

== Fictional character history ==
The main character, Sweeney Todd, and his accomplice Mrs. Lovett are in a square where Pirelli's assistant, Tobias Ragg, is advertising a concoction of his master's entitled Pirelli's Miracle Elixir, which is purported to stimulate the growth of hair. Todd takes one sniff of the mixture and denounces the elixir as "an arrant fraud" concocted of "piss and ink".

Enraged, Pirelli emerges from his tent to berate Todd, who offers to wager his own straight razors against five pounds of Pirelli's money. Whoever shaves a person the most quickly and dexterously will win, with Beadle Bamford acting as judge. Pirelli wastes time bragging about his vast talent and superiority over all other barbers. Todd, on the other hand, concentrates on doing the job and, after carefully preparing his razors and mixing the lather, shaves the customer in a matter of seconds to win the five pounds. Pirelli begrudgingly pays him five pounds.

The following day, Pirelli and Toby arrive at Mrs. Lovett's Meat Pie Emporium to visit Todd, whose establishment is atop Mrs. Lovett's. While Mrs. Lovett gives Toby a pie downstairs in her parlour, Pirelli ascends the stairs to Todd's room to confront him. Pirelli reveals that his real name is Daniel O'Higgins and he is in fact Irish. He reveals that he knows Todd's true identity as Benjamin Barker, having served as his apprentice as a small boy, and threatens to expose Todd to the Beadle unless he, Todd, pays him half of his profits. Todd, enraged, strangles him and throws his body in a trunk when Tobias enters the shop. While speaking to Tobias, Todd notices that Pirelli's hand is sticking out and feebly moving. After getting rid of the boy, Todd finishes Pirelli off by slashing his throat. Mrs. Lovett later takes his purse, where she finds three pounds, keeping the purse as her own. This scene was changed substantially for Tim Burton's 2007 film adaptation of the musical. In this interpretation, Pirelli is actually a Cockney thief named Davy Collins, rather than the Irish Daniel O'Higgins, and rather than strangling him, Todd bludgeons him into unconsciousness with an iron tea-pot before slitting his throat.

== Portrayals ==
In the original Broadway production, he was played by Joaquin Romaguera. He was played by John Aron in the 1980 London production. In the 2005 Broadway revival staged by John Doyle, he was played by Donna Lynne Champlin. In Tim Burton's 2007 film adaptation of the musical, he was portrayed by Sacha Baron Cohen. Nicholas Christopher played him in the 2023 Broadway revival.

== Songs ==
In the musical, Adolfo Pirelli sings two numbers by himself and several others with other characters. The songs include:

- "The Ballad of Sweeney Todd (Prologue)" (with Company)*
- "The Contest (Pirelli's Entrance/Shaving Sequence)"**
- "The Contest (Tooth-Pulling Sequence)" (with Tobias)*
- "Pirelli's Death"*
- "The Ballad of Sweeney Todd (Epilogue)" (with Company)*

* Cut from 2007 film
** Edited for 2007 film
