= Eugène Oudin =

American opera singer

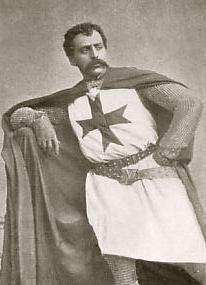
Eugene Oudin as Brian de Bois Guilbert in Sullivan's Ivanhoe

Eugène Espérance Oudin (24 February 1858 – 4 November 1894) was an American baritone, composer and translator of the Victorian era.

== Life and career ==
=== Early years ===
Oudin was one of six brothers born in New York City to French parents, Lucien and Sophie Agnus Oudin. He sang as a boy soprano in the choir of Dr. Tyng's church in New York City and studied music under Moderati. Oudin showed talent and was eventually entrusted with the baritone solos at St. Stephen's Roman Catholic Church. He studied Law at Yale University and was admitted to the Bar in 1879, joining the offices of his stepfather's legal firm Evart, Southmayd and Choate.

In 1881 he set up in legal practice for himself and continued this work for three years, until he accepted an offer to join the American Opera Company, singing for them several times in the western United States.

Travelling to Europe in May 1886, Oudin met fellow New Yorker Lady Randolph Churchill in London, who set him up as a salon singer, during which period he appeared before British aristocracy, including The Prince of Wales.

=== Opera and concert years ===
Oudin made his operatic stage debut in New York as Montosol in Josephine Sold by Her Sisters at Wallack's Theatre in August 1886 under the direction of John A. McCaull who brought Oudin over from Great Britain to appear with his McCaull Comic Opera Company. During this production he met his future wife, the soprano Louise Parker, who was his leading lady in the operetta.

In 1887, he starred as Count Erminio in Gasparone by Karl Millöcker in New York City at the Standard Theatre, together with Lillian Russell and J. H. Ryley. The New York Times wrote that his singing was an "especial feature" of the piece, and that "This artist has lost much of the self-consciousness that marked his early efforts, and his acting is now quite animated." Franz von Suppé's opera Die Jagd nach dem Glück was a failure in Vienna but was popular abroad and ran at Palmer's Theatre in New York as Clover from 8 May 1889 with Oudin and DeWolf Hopper in the cast. He also appeared in Dorothy in New York with Lillian Russell.

Later in 1889, Oudin was again singing in concerts in London, and in 1891 he sang the part of the Templar Brian de Bois Guilbert in Sir Arthur Sullivan's grand opera, Ivanhoe, at the Royal English Opera House. The Times had reported the year before that "the music for [the] part [was] being specially composed for [Oudin]". Richard D'Oyly Carte intended to follow Ivanhoe with a production of Richard Wagner's The Flying Dutchman, with Oudin in the title role. Sir Henry Wood, then répétiteur at the Royal English Opera House, later recalled in his memoirs, "I was already preparing The Flying Dutchman with Eugène Oudin in the name part. He would have been superb. However, plans were altered and the Dutchman was shelved." On 17 October 1892, Oudin was the first to sing in English the title role in Tschaikovsky's Eugene Onegin at the Olympic Theatre in London, conducted by Wood. Tschaikovsky was attached to Oudin both as an artist and a man and persuaded him to take part in Symphony Concerts in Moscow and Saint Petersburg in Russia during 1893.

Returning to England in January 1894, Oudin took part in concert performances of Cavalleria Rusticana and Pagliacci on 20 January 1894 at the Queen's Hall in London. Later that year he made a great success in Schumann's oratorio, Scenes from Goethe's Faust. From 2 to 5 October 1894, Oudin took part in the Birmingham Triennial Musical Festival. After taking part in a performance of Beethoven's Ninth Symphony on 20 October 1894 at The Queen's Hall in London, Oudin was so caught up by the audience's enthusiasm that, while visiting the conductor Hans Richter in the artist's room, he was struck down by a stroke, from which he died two weeks later at age 36.

=== Translator and songwriter ===
During the last few years of his life, Oudin also translated the lyrics of French songs and arias into English and also wrote the words and music of several songs. Oudin died at his London home in 1894 aged 36. He was buried in Brompton Cemetery, and Sir Arthur Sullivan was present at the funeral, having sent flowers "in the shape of a large Templar cross", recalling Oudin's greatest role in a work of Sullivan's. A benefit concert was held for his widow and children in London in 1895, which raised £1,000.
