= Robert Foster (swimmer) =

American swimmer (1891–1960)

Robert Bagley Foster
- Foster in Chicago Athletic Club Jersey

Personal information
- Born: February 22, 1891 Evanston, Illinois, United States
- Died: August 25, 1960 (aged 69) Westminster, London, England
- Occupations: American Representative; Colgate-Palmolive-Peet Company, London
- Spouses: Josephine Pontius Ramsey (m. 1913, divorced); Barbara Newberry (m. 1935; div. 1950)
- Children: 2

Sport
- Sport: Swimming
- Events: 100, 200 freestyle Open Water Distance
- Strokes: Freestyle
- Club: Chicago Athletic Association; Illinois Athletic Club (IAC)
- Coach: Bill Bachrach (IAC) By 1912

Robert Bagley Foster (February 22, 1891 – August 25, 1960) was an American swimmer who represented the Chicago Athletic Association and the Illinois Athletic Club, and later worked as a business executive. He competed in the men's 100 metre freestyle event at the 1908 London Olympics, though he did not make the finals.

== Early life ==
Foster was born one of four siblings on February 22, 1891, in Evanston, Illinois, and according to one source attended Evanston High School in March, 1908. He was the son of Lillian Eliza Foster (née Bagley) and Adelbert Merton Foster of Evanston, Illinois, founder of the Foster-Forbes Glass Company. At 18, he was entered in the 100-yard and 200-yard competition, representing Evanston High School, for the Sectional AAU Swimming Tournament, and High School Championships held in the Chicago Athletic Association Pool on March 10–11, 1908. Through around 1912, Foster swam for the Chicago Athletic Club, where he was coached primarily by Alex Meffert.

=== Early swimming career ===
As an upperclassman Foster attended Mercersburg Academy, where he graduated in 1909.. He was the first Mercersburg student to compete at the Olympics, which he did before graduating high school. After the Olympics, he continued to represent the Illinois Athletic Club where he was managed and trained by Hall of Fame Coach Bill Bachrach by 1912.

Swimming for the Illinois Athletic Club in April 1912, he swam in a five-man team that included Perry McGillivray and Harry Hebner for a 500-yard freestyle relay race that finished in a time of 4:52.6, breaking the National record of 4:57, formerly set by the New York Athletic Club's swimming team.

On the afternoon of July 27, 1912, Foster was entered among a group of twenty swimmers for a 2 1/2-mile open water swimming event from the Lake View Crib to the Wilson Avenue Bathing Beach in Chicago. In early September 1909, he was credited with placing second in a 10-mile open water swimming marathon in the Mississippi. In the 2 1/2-mile Lake View to Wilson Avenue swim among twelve competitors on July 23, 1910, Foster did not complete the race, exhausting himself by swimming at the front of the pack for the first mile, when he was passed by Michael McDermott of the Chicago Central YMCA, then coached by Bill Bachrach. There was a strong wind and choppy seas that extended the race to around three miles, and slowed the competitors.

In June 1908, Foster represented the Chicago Athletic Association when he was selected by the Olympic committee as a likely qualifier, on the first choice list for the 1908 London Olympics. The group selected included 15 names from Chicago Athletic Club, the club providing the most members for the team.

== 1908 London Olympics ==
Foster competed for the U.S. Olympic team in the men's 100 metre freestyle swimming event at the 1908 Summer Olympics in London. Foster swam in the fourth preliminary heat, though his time was not recorded, and he did not advance to the finals, as he did not finish among the top two competitors. Among the competitors in his preliminary heat were Harald Julin of Sweden who won the heat with a time of 1:12.0, advanced to the finals, and won a bronze medal, as noted. In the final heat, Charlie Daniels of the U.S. team won the gold with a time of 1:05.6, Zoltan Halmay of Hungary won the silver with a time of 1:06.2, and Harald Julin of Sweden won the bronze with a time eof 1:08.0.

=== Careers ===
After returning from the 1908 Olympics, he initially worked for his father's company, Foster-Forbes Glass. He later relocated to England where he met his first wife Josephine Ramsey. From at least 1920 to 1935, upon first moving to London, he worked as an English representative for the Colgate Palmolive Peet Company which traces its roots to 1928 when the Palmolive Peet Company, which primarily made Palmolive Soap, purchased the Colgate Company which primarily made toothpaste. For a period the company was known as Colgate Palmolive Peet, before becoming Colgate Palmolive.

== Marriage and family ==
At the age of 22, Foster married Josephine Pontius Ramsey of Chicago, a recent graduate of the Dana Hall High School, on June 11, 1913, at the living room in Dana Hall at Wellesley College, immediately following her graduation from Dana Hall. Dana Hall is an all-girls boarding High School closely associated with Wellesley College. Accompanied by Dana Hall's music instructor, the 400 recent graduates of Dana Hall sang the wedding music composed by Lohengrin, which included "Here Comes the Bride (Bridal Chorus)". They had two children: a daughter Phoebe Louise Foster in 1917, who married Lieutenant Osbert Stephen Boothby, the son of Commander William Osbert Boothby MVO RN, and a son David Ramsey Foster in 1920, who was a decorated pilot in the British Royal Navy during World War II and business executive.

Foster and Ramsey divorced on December 28, 1935, around the age of 43, he married Barbara Newberry, Coldwater, Michigan, at the home of Newbury's Aunt, while the couple had returned to America. Newberry, then around 25, was an American actress, and former member of the Ziegfield follies. Foster met Newberry in London while she was appearing in musical comedies. At the time, Foster was known as an accomplished amateur golfer in England who had won the Prince of Wales Cup. Newberry and Foster divorced in Reno, Nevada, on February 21, 1950.

Foster died at the age of 69 on August 25, 1960, in Mayfair, Westminster, England, and was interred by Golders Green Crematorium.
