= Gay Divorce =

1932 musical with music and lyrics by Cole Porter

- Playbill from original Shubert Theater run
- Music: Cole Porter
- Lyrics: Cole Porter
- Book: Dwight Taylor; Adapted by: Kenneth Webb and Samuel Hoffenstein
- Basis: An unproduced play by J. Hartley Manners
- Productions: 1932 Broadway; 1933 West End; 1933 Australian Tour

Gay Divorce is a musical with music and lyrics by Cole Porter and book by Dwight Taylor, adapted by Kenneth Webb and Samuel Hoffenstein. It was Fred Astaire's last Broadway show and featured the hit song "Night and Day" in which Astaire danced with co-star Claire Luce.

RKO Radio Pictures released a film production of the musical in 1934, starring Astaire and Ginger Rogers, renamed The Gay Divorcee.

== Plot ==
Guy Holden, an American writer traveling in England, falls madly in love with a woman named Mimi, who disappears after their first encounter. To take his mind off his lost love, his friend Teddy Egbert, a British attorney, takes him to Brighton, where Egbert has arranged for a "paid co-respondent" to assist his client in obtaining a divorce from her boring, aging, geologist husband Robert.

What Holden does not know is that the client is none other than Mimi, who in turn mistakes him — because he is too ashamed of his occupation to say what it is, namely pseudonymously writing cheap "bodice ripper" romance novels — for the paid co-respondent.

At the end, when her husband appears, he is unconvinced by the faked adultery—but is then unwittingly revealed, by the waiter at the resort, to have been genuinely adulterous himself.

== Songs ==
Act I

- After You, Who?
- Why Marry Them?
- Salt Air
- I Still Love the Red, White and Blue
- After You, Who? (Reprise)
- Where Would You Get Your Coat? ‡‡ - Gertrude (from Fifty Million Frenchmen)
- Night and Day
- How's Your Romance?

Act II

- What Will Become of Our England?
- I've Got You on My Mind
- Mr. and Mrs. Fitch
- I Love Only You ‡ - Tonetti
- You're in Love

‡new song for the London production, ‡‡for London production

== Background and productions ==
Astaire's sister Adele retired from show business and married Lord Charles Cavendish after her last show with Fred, The Band Wagon (1931). When the producers of Gay Divorce asked Fred to star in the show, he deferred an answer until he could spend the summer of 1932 wooing his future wife, Phyllis, in London. He finally agreed, and rehearsals began in September 1932. The show was both Astaire's last Broadway musical (after which he moved to Hollywood) and his only stage musical without Adele. Also in the cast were Erik Rhodes and Eric Blore who soon became famous in the early 1930s RKO comedies.

Gay Divorce opened in pre-Broadway tryouts at the Wilbur Theatre, Boston, on November 7, 1932, and then moved to the Shubert Theatre, New Haven on November 21, 1932. It opened on Broadway at the Ethel Barrymore Theatre on November 29, 1932, and transferred to the Shubert Theatre on January 16, 1933, and closed on July 1, 1933, for a total run of 248 performances. Directed by Howard Lindsay with choreography by Barbara Newberry and Carl Randall, and set design by Jo Mielziner, the cast featured Fred Astaire as Guy Holden, Claire Luce as Mimi, Luella Gear as Hortense, G. P. Huntley Jr. as Teddy, Betty Starbuck as Barbara Wray, Erik Rhodes as Tonetti, Eric Blore as Waiter, and Roland Bottomley as Pratt.

The show opened in the West End at the Palace Theatre on November 2, 1933 and ran for 180 performances. It was directed by Felix Edwardes with Astaire, Luce, Rhodes and Blore reprising their roles. They were joined by Olive Blakeney as Gertrude Howard, Claud Allister as Teddy, Joan Gardner as Barbara Wray and Fred Hearne as Octavius Mann.

The Australian tour, presented by J. C. Williamson's, commenced in Melbourne at the King's Theatre on 23 December 1933. The production starred British actors Madge Aubrey, Billy Milton, and Iris Kirkwhite as Mimi. Kirkwhite's understudy Mona Potts opened the show as Mimi with two days notice after Kirkwhite injured her ankle in rehearsal. The production then played the Theatre Royal, Adelaide from 21 April 1934. The Perth season, commencing May 5, 1934, J. C. Williamson’s presented three musical comedies, The Girl Friend, Gay Divorce (commencing May 12) and Our Miss Gibbs (commencing May 19) as well as a one night only performance of Gay Divorce at Kalgoorlie Town Hall on 29 May 1934. The final two stops of the tour included His Majesty's Theatre, Brisbane, opening 9 June 1934 and concluding at the Theatre Royal, Sydney opening 28 July 1934.

The book is dated, and professional modern productions are rare. Goodspeed Opera House staged the show in 1983 and an adapted version was seen off-Broadway in New York in 1987. The 1987 Off-Broadway production was mounted for the opening of Martin R. Kaufman Theatre in Hell's Kitchen, Manhattan. The production starred Oliver Woodall as Guy Holden, Debra Dickinson as Mimi, Diane Findlay as Hortense, and Joaquin Romaguera as Teddy. Romaguera was nominated for the Drama Desk Award for Outstanding Featured Actor in a Musical for his portrayal. A concert version was presented at Carnegie Hall (Weill Recital Hall) in New York City in June 1993 and featured Robert Westenberg as Guy, Rebecca Luker as Mimi, Judy Kaye as Hortense, and Kurt Ollmann as Tonetti. A "Musicals Tonight!" (New York City) concert production ran in March 2004.

In 2000, Lost Musicals, aka The Lost Musicals Charitable Trust, presented at London's Palace Theatre Gay Divorce with the BBC. Ian Marshall Fisher directed, Kevin Amos Music, Director. The cast included Janie Dee, Thelma Ruby, Tim Flavin and Julie Wilson appearing along with the BBC orchestra. This was the second and only appearance of this show and playing in the same theatre where the original London production played. The regional company 42nd Street Moon produced the piece in San Francisco, California from April 12 - May 6, 2007.
