= Barbara Newberry =

American actress, dancer, singer, and choreographer (1910–1986)

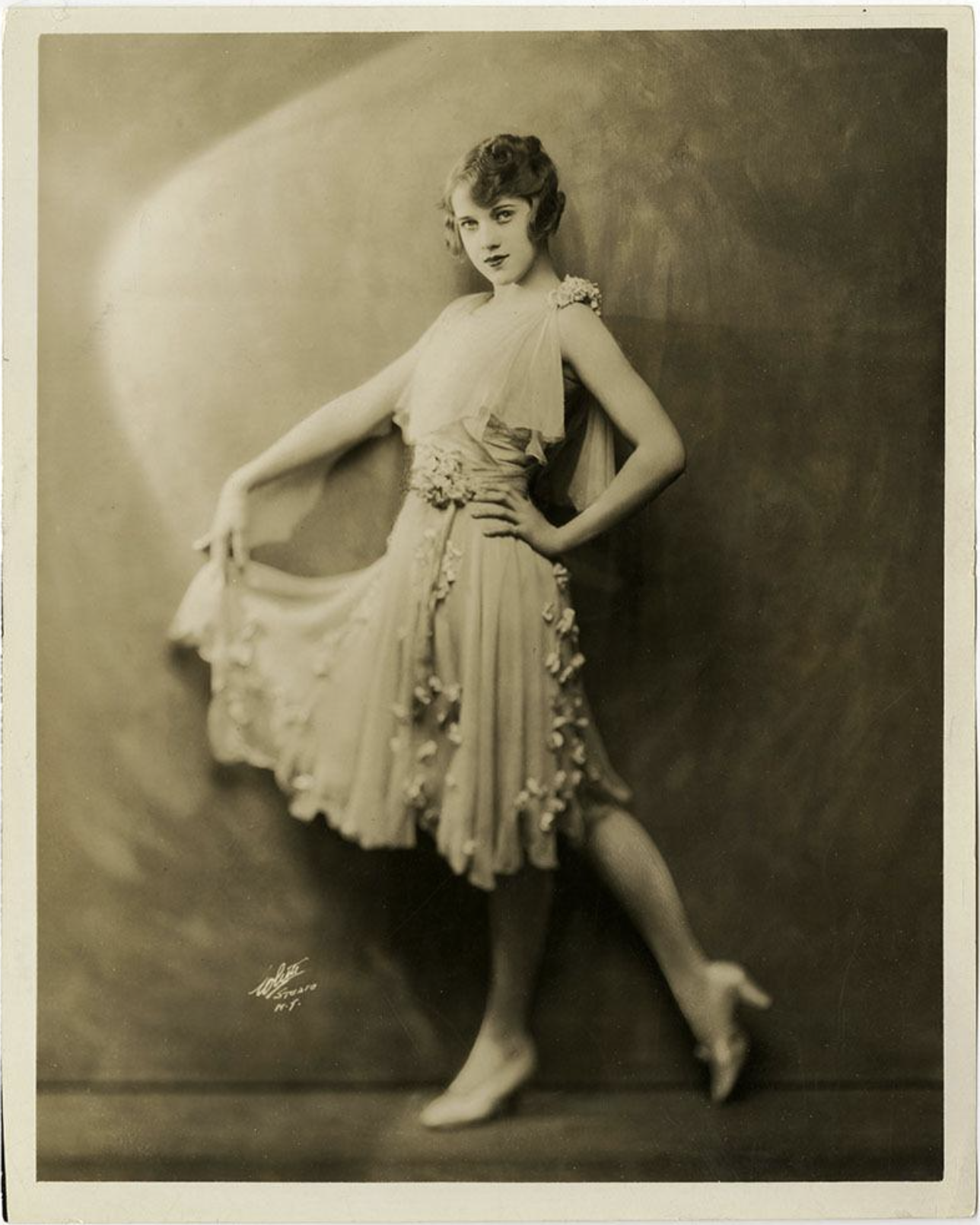
- Newberry in 1927
- Born: Barbara Newberry; April 12, 1910; Newton, Massachusetts, U.S.
- Died: October 1986 (aged 76); New York City, U.S.
- Occupations: Actress; dancer; singer; choreographer
- Years active: 1918–1935
- Spouses: Eddie Foy, Jr. (m. 1930; div. 1932); Robert Bagley Foster (m. 1936; div. 1950); Paris Graham Singer (m. 1950; div. 1953)

Barbara Newberry (1910–1986) was an American actress, dancer, singer, and choreographer.

== Early years ==
Newberry was born in 1910 in Newton, MA, to Max Wilford Newberry and his wife, Elizabeth Fay Wiley. From news reports, it appears she was living in the Bronx section of New York City by 1918. Reports have her in Chicago, Illinois, by early 1925, and back in New York City later the same year.

== Career as a child performer ==
In 1918, Newberry was cast in "a significant child role" for the Winthrop Ames New York production of Maurice Maeterlinck's The Betrothal. The eight-year-old was described as "a pupil of Mme. Voerhoeven of the Metropolitan Opera company, and Mirlam Nelke, of the Belasco dramatic school."

Newberry is mentioned again in connection with a January 1925 show at the Capitol Theater in Chicago, during which she danced with a ballet backup of 12. Later that same year, The Chicago Tribune noted that "Barbara Newberry, a Chicago beauty" had been cast in the 1925 edition of the Ziegfeld Follies.

== Adult theatrical career ==
Newberry quickly established herself as a star dancer, and she appeared regularly in Broadway musicals for the next eight years. After the Ziegfeld Follies of 1925, she performed in productions such as No Foolin (1926), Golden Dawn (1927–28), Good Boy (1928–29), and in Show Girl (1929). She achieved widespread fame in 1929 when Florenz Ziegfeld, Jr. pronounced that she had "the most beautiful legs in America." That assessment would be repeated hundreds, if not thousands, of times in future press stories about Newberry.

Cole Porter gave her the job as choreographer, with Carl Randall, for Gay Divorce (1932–33), starring Fred Astaire in his last Broadway show. Newberry and Randall also handled the choreography for Gay Divorce at London's Palace Theatre from 1933 to 1934. The final collaborative project between Newberry and Randall came in November 1933 when they produced and starred in The Monte Carlo Follies at the Dorchester Hotel in London.

Newberry's last big show was Love Laughs in 1935 at the London Hippodrome where she performed with Laddie Cliff, the British dancer, choreographer, actor, producer, writer, and director of comedy, musical theatre and film, near the end of his career.

== Personal life ==
Newberry married Eddie Foy, Jr. on May 12, 1930. They were divorced in 1932.

While in London near the end of the run for Gay Divorce, it was reported that Briton George Farrar proposed marriage to Newberry. Accounts suggest that her dance partner of many years, Carl Randall, was strongly against the match and reportedly "brought her back to America" in April 1934. The events surrounding the matter broke up what had been a highly successful theatrical partnership between Newberry and Randall. Newberry married Robert Bagley Foster, a business executive and former Olympic swimmer on December 28, 1935. They divorced in February 1950.

Newberry married Paris Singer, grandson of Isaac Merritt Singer, developer of the popular sewing machine, in March 1950. They divorced in 1953.

== Death ==
Newberry died in New York City in October 1986.
