= Chicago City Limits =

Theatre company in New York City

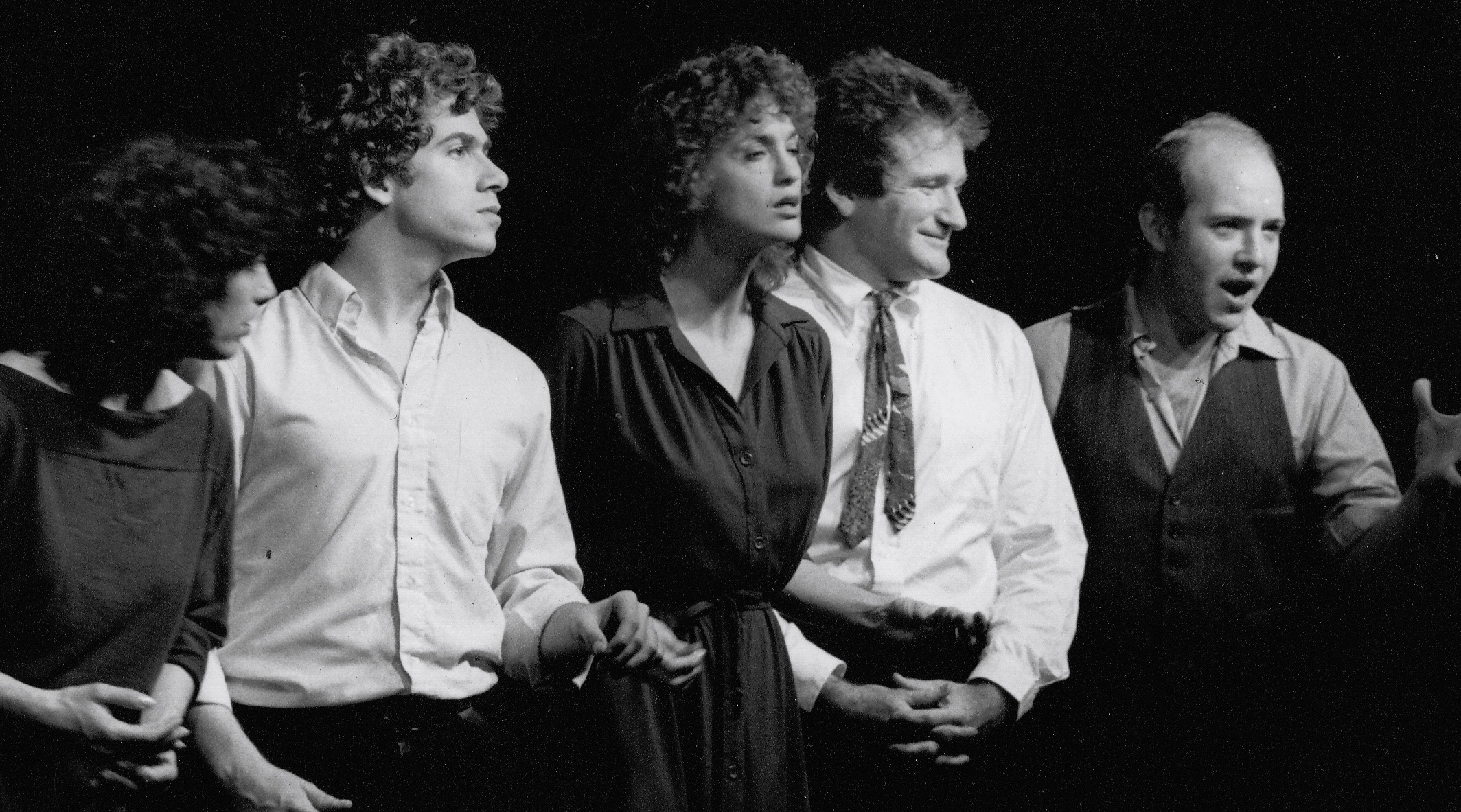
- Robin Williams with Chicago City Limits in 1983
- Formation: 1977
- Type: Improvisational Comedy Theatre Company
- Website: www.chicagocitylimits.com

Chicago City Limits (CCL) is an improvisational theatre company in New York City.

== History ==
Chicago City Limits was founded in New York City in 1977. George Todisco started the group in Chicago with actors participating in the workshop program at The Second City, studying under Del Close. Among the players were founding members Todisco, Linda Gelman, Bill McLaughlin, Carol Schindler, Paul Zuckerman, Rick Crom and Christopher Oyen. Oyen served as The Second City's stage manager, and Todisco, McLaughlin, Schindler and Sandy Smith (an early member of the troupe), all appeared in "The Del Close Farewell Salute to Chicago" in 1978. In 1979, Chicago City Limits relocated to New York, performing regularly at Catch a Rising Star, the Improv, the Duplex, Folk City and other notable NYC clubs. It established its own theater (now the José Quintero Theatre) in the summer of 1980 on W 42nd Street, thus creating NYC's most successful improvisational theatre to date, and the last improvisational theatre in NYC to offer the New York company salaried positions.) After setting up the theater on 42nd Street (1 year), the troupe relocated to the Jan Hus Playhouse at 351 E 74th St. (14 years) and, later, at their own theatre in 1994 at 1105 1st Avenue (9 years). The group moved to The Broadway Comedy Club on W 53rd St. (9 years)and returned to the Jan Hus Playhouse until 2016. CCL currently tours and offers workshop opportunities.

CCL was a four-time recipient of The Manhattan Association of Cabarets and Clubs (MAC) Award. The Chicago City Limits National Touring Company received the first MAC Award given for Best Comedy/Improv Group in 1987 and again in 1988. The New York Company won again in 2008 & 2009. In 2011, Top 10 New York City by Eleanor Berman rated it one of New York City's top 10 comedy clubs.

== See also ==
- List of improvisational theatre companies
