= Nicholas Christopher (actor) =

Bermudian-American actor and singer (born 1990)

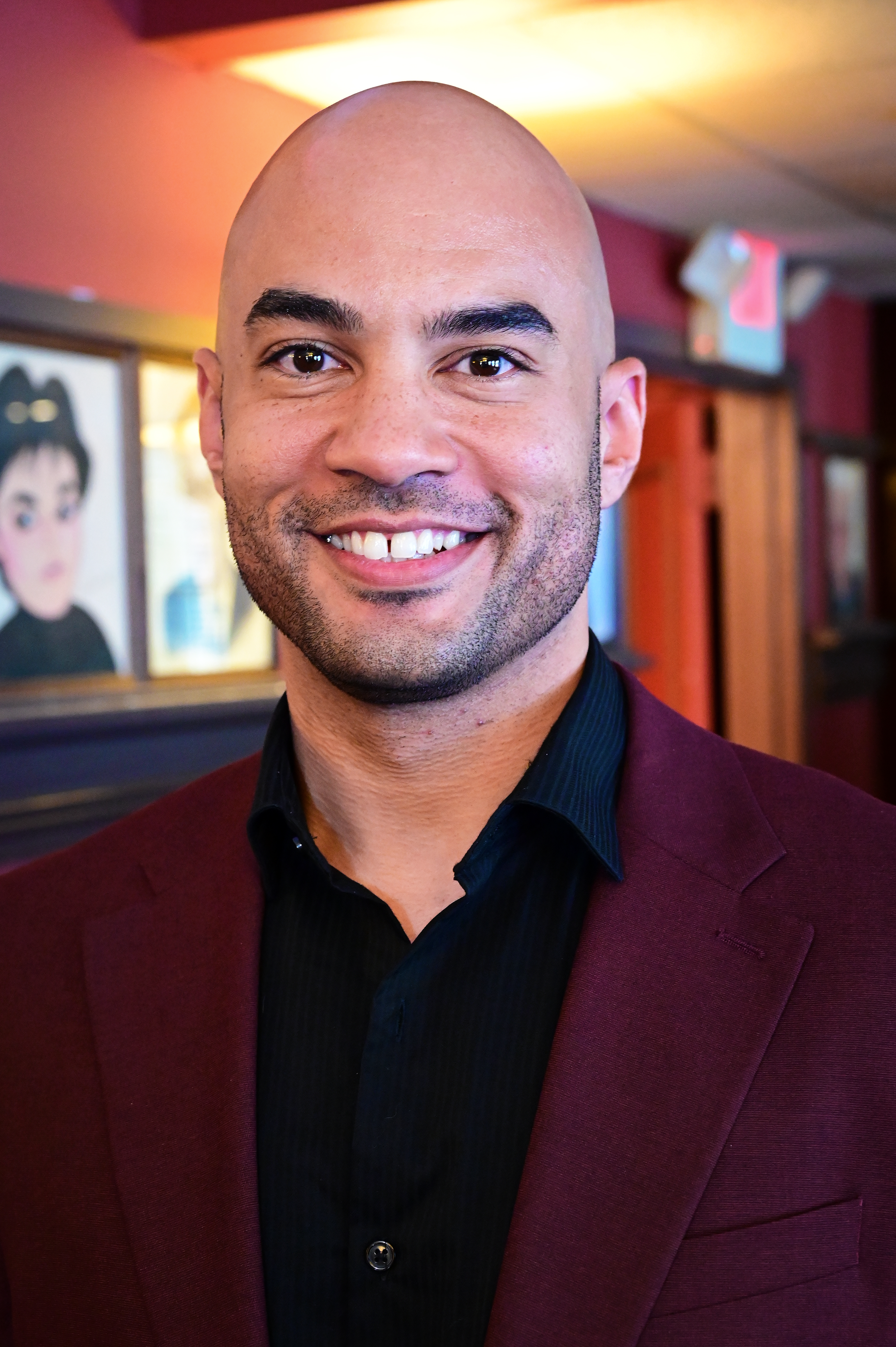
- Christopher in 2026
- Born: August 16, 1990 (age 36); Bermuda
- Other name: Nick Christopher
- Citizenship: Bermuda; United States
- Education: Boston Conservatory (attended); Juilliard School (attended)
- Occupations: Actor; singer
- Years active: 2004–present
- Known for: Chess; Sweeney Todd: The Demon Barber of Fleet Street; Hamilton

Nicholas Christopher (born August 16, 1990) is a Bermudian-American actor and singer. He is best known for his Tony-nominated performance as Anatoly Sergievsky in the first Broadway revival of the musical Chess. He is also known for portraying Adolfo Pirelli in the 2023 Broadway revival of Sweeney Todd: The Demon Barber of Fleet Street. He later starred in the titular role of Sweeney Todd in the same production from January 17 to February 8, 2024, after Josh Groban departed the show and before Aaron Tveit began his run as Sweeney Todd.

Christopher also starred on Broadway as Bobby Darin in Just in Time (2026), John Thomas in Miss Saigon (2017–2018) and as Aaron Burr and George Washington in Hamilton (2016–2025). He also played Seymour Krelborn in the off-Broadway revival of Little Shop of Horrors (2024–2025).

== Career ==
=== Early career ===
Christopher was born in Bermuda to a Bermudian father and American mother. When he was 7 years old Christopher and his mother moved to the United States. He attended Cambridge Matignon School through his junior year when he transferred to the Walnut Hill School for the Performing Arts. He then enrolled Boston Conservatory for one year, followed by a year at the Juilliard School before he dropped out after getting cast as Benny in the first national tour of In The Heights. He then made his Off-Broadway debut as Tom Collins in the revival of Rent.

He made his Broadway debut in 2013 as a part of the ensemble of Motown: The Musical. The following year, he was promoted to the role of Smokey Robinson in the show's national touring cast.

In 2016, Christopher joined the Broadway cast of Hamilton at the Richard Rodgers Theatre serving as a standby and understudy for the roles of Washington and Burr. He replaced original cast member Christopher Jackson in the principal role of George Washington in November 2016. He left the cast a few months later to star as John Thomas in the first Broadway revival of Miss Saigon at the Broadway Theatre. In 2018, he returned to Hamilton to star in the leading role of Aaron Burr for the show's national tour, and rejoined the Broadway cast in 2019 to reprise his role of Washington. From August 2021 to March 2022, Christopher reprised the role of Burr in the show's Los Angeles production at the Hollywood Pantages Theatre.

Christopher had a recurring role on all three seasons of the television series All Rise (2020–2023) as David Sanders.

=== Rise to prominence ===
In 2023, Christopher returned to Broadway as Adolfo Pirelli in the revival of Stephen Sondheim’s Sweeney Todd: The Demon Barber of Fleet Street at the Lunt-Fontanne Theatre. In addition to portraying Pirelli, he also understudied Josh Groban in the titular role. After Groban and Annaleigh Ashford departed from the cast, Christopher and Jeanna de Waal took over the roles of Todd and Mrs. Lovett for a temporary stint from January to February 2024 before Aaron Tveit and Sutton Foster joined the cast. In March 2024, he took a leave of absence from Sweeney Todd to star as Jelly Roll Morton in New York City Center’s production of Jelly's Last Jam.

From August to October 2024, he returned to the Broadway cast of Hamilton for a stint as Washington. Christopher then joined the cast of the Off-Broadway revival of Little Shop of Horrors starring as Seymour Krelborn opposite Sherie Rene Scott as Audrey through February 2025 at the Westside Theatre. In April, he reprised his role of Burr for a week in the Broadway cast of Hamilton covering for Jared Dixon. In August 2025, he rejoined the Off-Broadway cast of Little Shop of Horrors as Seymour opposite Madeline Brewer as Audrey for a month. In September 2026, Christopher performed at the MetLife Stadium in a Hamilton medley, reprising his role of Burr. The performance was during a New York Giants NFL halftime show to commemorate the twenty-fifth anniversary of 9/11.

In October 2025, Christopher led the first Broadway revival of Chess playing Anatoly Sergievsky, alongside Aaron Tveit as Freddie Trumper and Lea Michele as Florence Vassy. The limited run at the Imperial Theatre is set to run until June 2026. He was nominated for a Tony Award, a Drama League Award and an Outer Critics Circle Award for his performance.

In October 2026, it was announced that Christopher will be headlining the Broadway musical Just in Time as Bobby Darin beginning in November, replacing Matthew Morrison. Christopher is set to begin his run as Darin on November 10, 2026

== Performance credits ==
=== Theatre ===
Year(s)	Production	Role	Notes
2004	Aida	Ensemble	North Shore Music Theatre
2007	High School Musical on Stage!	Ensemble	North Shore Music Theatre
2010–2011	In the Heights	Benny	US National Tour
2011–2012	Rent	Tom Collins	New World Stages, Off-Broadway
2013–2014	Motown: The Musical	Ensemble u/s Smokey Robinson	Lunt-Fontanne Theatre, Broadway
2014–2015	Motown: The Musical	Smokey Robinson	US National Tour
2015	The Tempest	Boatswain / Spirit	Delacorte Theatre
2015	Whorl Inside a Loop	Rick	Second Stage Theatre, Off-Broadway
2015–2016	Lazarus	Ben	New York Theatre Workshop, Off-Broadway
2016	Hamilton	s/b George Washington u/s Aaron Burr	Richard Rodgers Theatre, Broadway
2016–2017	Hamilton	George Washington	Richard Rodgers Theatre, Broadway
2017–2018	Miss Saigon	John Thomas	Broadway Theatre, Broadway
2018	Hamilton	Aaron Burr	US National Tour
2019	Hamilton	George Washington	Richard Rodgers Theatre, Broadway
2021–2022	Hamilton	Aaron Burr	Hollywood Pantages Theatre
2023–2024	Sweeney Todd: The Demon Barber of Fleet Street	Adolfo Pirelli s/b Sweeney Todd	Lunt-Fontanne Theatre, Broadway
2024	Sweeney Todd: The Demon Barber of Fleet Street	Sweeney Todd	Lunt-Fontanne Theatre, Broadway
2024	Jelly's Last Jam	Jelly Roll Morton	New York City Center, Off-Broadway
2024	Sweeney Todd: The Demon Barber of Fleet Street	Adolfo Pirelli s/b Sweeney Todd	Lunt-Fontanne Theatre, Broadway
2024	Hamilton	George Washington	Richard Rodgers Theatre, Broadway
2024–2025	Little Shop of Horrors	Seymour Krelborn	Westside Theatre, Off-Broadway
2025	Hamilton	Aaron Burr	Richard Rodgers Theatre, Broadway
2025	Little Shop of Horrors	Seymour Krelborn	Westside Theatre, Off-Broadway
2025–2026	Chess	Anatoly Sergievsky	Imperial Theatre, Broadway
2026–2027	Just in Time	Bobby Darin	Circle in the Square Theatre, Broadway

=== Television ===
Year(s)	Production	Role	Notes
2016	Sex & Drugs & Rock & Roll	AJ	2 episodes
2020	Little Voice	Himself	Episode: "Love Hurts"
2020–2023	All Rise	David Sanders	10 episodes
2021	United States of Al	Tater	Episode: "Help/Komak"

=== Cast recordings ===
Year	Title	Role	Notes
2023	Sweeney Todd: The Demon Barber of Fleet Street	Adolfo Pirelli	Broadway cast recording
2026	Chess	Anatoly Sergievsky	Broadway cast recording

== Awards and nominations ==
Year	Award	Category	Work	Result	Ref.
2026	Outer Critics Circle Award	Outstanding Lead Performer in a Broadway Musical	Chess	Nominated	
2026	Drama League Award	Distinguished Performance	Chess	Nominated	
2026	Drama Desk Awards	Outstanding Lead Performance in a Musical	Chess	Nominated	
2026	Tony Awards	Best Performance by a Leading Actor in a Musical	Chess	Nominated	
2026	Broadway.com Audience Choice Awards	Favorite Leading Actor in a Musical	Chess	Nominated	
2026	Broadway.com Audience Choice Awards	Favorite Onstage Pair (with Lea Michele)	Chess	Nominated	
2026	Broadway.com Audience Choice Awards	Favorite Onstage Pair (with Aaron Tveit)	Chess	Nominated	
2026	Broadway.com Audience Choice Awards	Performance of the Year (Musical)	Chess	Nominated	
2026	Dorian Award	Outstanding Lead Performance in a Broadway Musical	Chess	Nominated	
2026	Dorian Award	Broadway Showstopper Award	"Anthem", Chess	Nominated	
