= Joaquin Romaguera =

American tenor and actor (1932–2023)

- Born: September 5, 1932; Key West, Florida, U.S.
- Died: May 9, 2023 (aged 90)
- Occupations: Tenor; actor

Joaquin Fidel Romaguera (September 5, 1932 – May 9, 2023) was an American tenor and actor. A longtime performer with the New York City Opera from the 1960s through the 1980s, he notably created the role of Professor Risselberg in the world premiere of Gian Carlo Menotti's The Most Important Man in 1971. On Broadway he originated the role of Adolfo Pirelli in the original Broadway production of Stephen Sondheim's Sweeney Todd: The Demon Barber of Fleet Street (1979). He was nominated for the Drama Desk Award for Outstanding Featured Actor in a Musical for his portrayal of Teddy in the 1987 off-Broadway revival of Cole Porter's Gay Divorce. Other career milestones included portraying Nicolas Orsini in the world premiere of Alberto Ginastera's Bomarzo with the Opera Society of Washington (1967, a role which he also recorded on disc), and appearing as Captain Pirzel in the United States premiere of Bernd Alois Zimmermann's Die Soldaten with conductor Sarah Caldwell and the Opera Company of Boston in 1982.

== Life and career ==
Born in Key West, Florida, Romaguera began his career at the age of 18 as a tenor with the Miami Opera Company. He is best known for his portrayals of Adolfo Pirelli in the original Broadway production of Stephen Sondheim's Sweeney Todd: The Demon Barber of Fleet Street (1979) and Teddy in the off-Broadway 1987 revival of Cole Porter's Gay Divorce at the Martin R. Kaufman Theatre. For the latter role he was nominated for the Drama Desk Award for Outstanding Featured Actor in a Musical in 1987. In late 1987 and early 1988 he portrayed the leading role of Robinet in the off-Broadway musical Mademoiselle Colombe at the Theatre Off Park. In 1994 he portrayed Mr. Lopez in Jerry Bock's Fiorello! for the first Encores! at the New York City Center. In 2000 he gave his final stage performance as Magaldi in Andrew Lloyd Webber's Evita with Broadway Sacramento.

In addition to working in musical theatre, Romaguera appeared regularly in operas with the New York City Opera (NYCO) from the late 1960s into the 1980s. He notably created roles in several world premieres with the NYCO, including The Dead Man in Hugo Weisgall's Nine Rivers from Jordan (1968) and Professor Risselberg in Gian Carlo Menotti's The Most Important Man (1971). In 1972 he recorded the role of Parpignol in Giacomo Puccini's La bohème with the NYCO in a cast that included José Carreras as Rodolfo, Elisabeth Carron as Mimi, and Nancy Shade as Musetta.

Other roles Romaguera sang with the NYCO included Monostatos in Mozart's The Magic Flute (1969); Goro in Puccini's Madama Butterfly (1969); the Village Drunk in Dmitri Shostakovich's Lady Macbeth of the Mtsensk District (1970); the Chief Justice in Giuseppe Verdi's Un ballo in maschera (1971, 1974); Nathaniel in Jacques Offenbach's The Tales of Hoffmann (1972); Little Bat in Carlisle Floyd's Susannah (1972); Normanno in Donizetti's Lucia di Lammermoor (1974); Spoletta in Puccini's Tosca (1974); Slave in Richard Strauss's Salome (1975); Dr. Blind in Johann Strauss II's Die Fledermaus (1975); the Emperor Altoum in Puccini's Turandot (1975, 1977); Balthasar Zorn in Richard Wagner's Die Meistersinger von Nürnberg (1975); Nereo in Arrigo Boito's Mefistofele (1977); The Pony Express rider in Puccini's La fanciulla del West (1977); and Pisoni in Robert Wright and George Forrest's Song of Norway (1981).

Romaguera also sang operas with other organizations. In 1967 he portrayed Nicolás Orsini in the world premiere of Alberto Ginastera's Bomarzo with the Opera Society of Washington; a role he recorded on disc and repeated a year later at the NYCO. In 1969 he portrayed Cassio in Giuseppe Verdi's Otello with the Boston Symphony Orchestra conducted by Erich Leinsdorf at the Tanglewood Music Festival. That same year he sang the title role in the world premiere of Ashley Vernon's The Triumph of Punch at the Brooklyn Academy of Music. In 1982 he portrayed Captain Pirzel in the United States premiere of Bernd Alois Zimmermann's Die Soldaten with conductor Sarah Caldwell and the Opera Company of Boston. That same year he sang Emperor Altoum with the San Diego Opera. In 1991 he sang Goro in Madama Butterfly for the Baltimore Opera Company.

Romaguera's life partner, the Broadway hair designer Robert W. Cybula, died in 2000. In 2004 he directed a production of Fiddler on the Roof for Island Opera Theatre in the Florida Keys.

Romaguera lived in retirement in Mount Dora, Florida. He died on May 9, 2023, at the age of 90.
