= Ivanhoe (opera) =

Opera composed by Arthur Sullivan

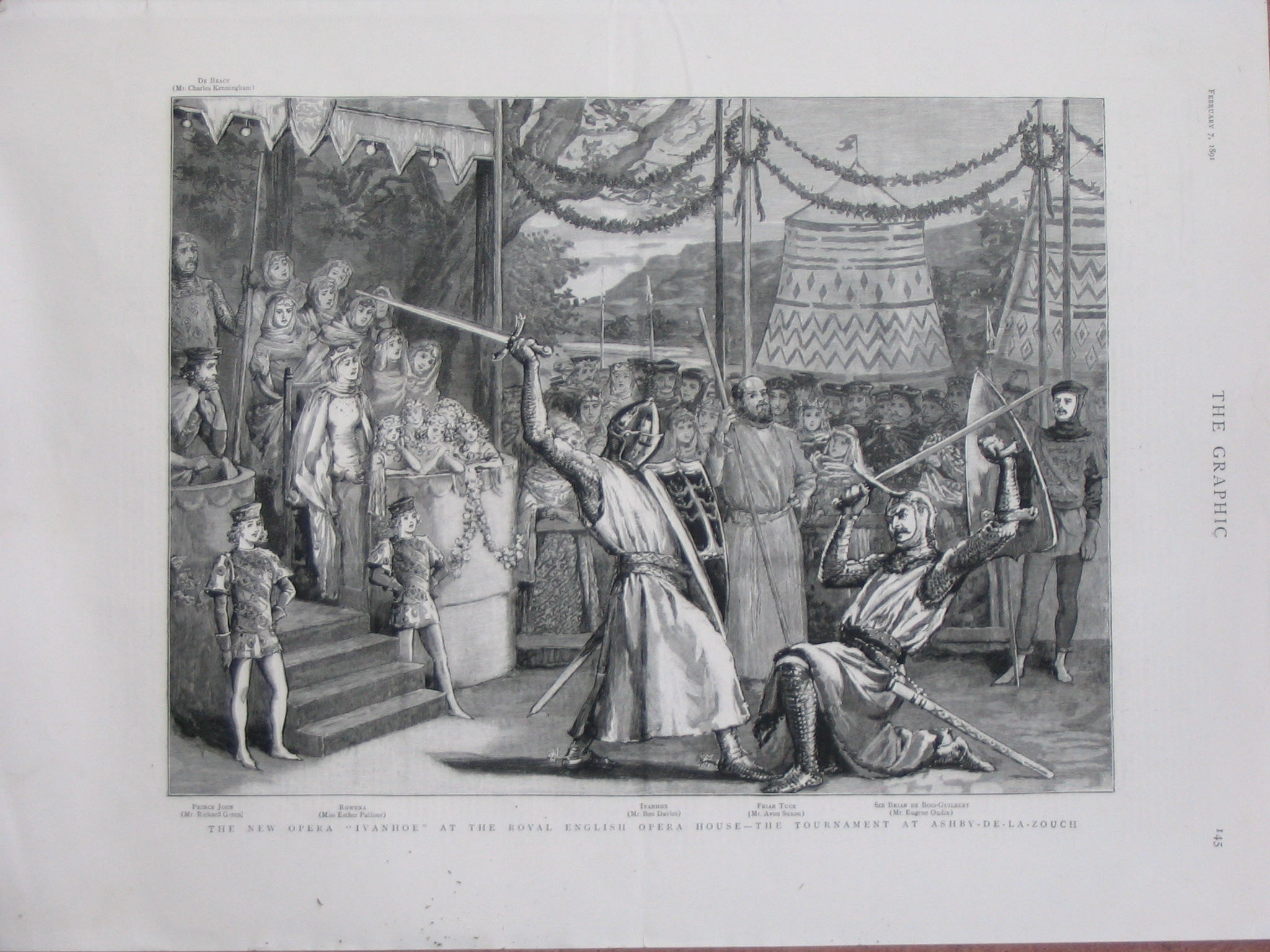
Illustration of scene from Ivanhoe in The Graphic, 1891

Ivanhoe is a romantic opera in three acts based on the 1819 novel by Sir Walter Scott, with music by Sir Arthur Sullivan and a libretto by Julian Sturgis. It premiered at the Royal English Opera House on 31 January 1891 for a consecutive run of 155 performances, a record for a grand opera. Later that year it was performed six more times, making a total of 161 performances. It was toured by Carl Rosa Opera Company in 1894–1895 but has rarely been performed since. The first complete, fully professional recording was released in 2010 on the Chandos Records label.

== Background ==
After the days of Michael William Balfe and his contemporaries, the fashion in London, led by the Prince of Wales, was for opera houses to present mostly imported operas from Italy, France and Germany. English opera went into decline, and no through-composed operas were written in England after 1844 until 1874. After this, a few English composers wrote new operas in English, some with English themes, and the Carl Rosa Opera Company produced many of these in the late 1870s and 1880s. Arthur Sullivan had long dreamed of writing a grand opera in what he called an "eclectic" style that would build on the existing European styles. In an 1885 interview, he said:

"The opera of the future is a compromise. I have thought and worked and toiled and dreamt of it. Not the French school, with gaudy and tinsel tunes, its lambent lights and shades, its theatrical effects and clap-trap; not the Wagnerian school, with its somberness and heavy ear-splitting airs, with its mysticism and unreal sentiment; not the Italian school, with its fantastic airs and fioriture and far-fetched effects. It is a compromise between these three – a sort of eclectic school, a selection of the merits of each one. I myself will make an attempt to produce a grand opera of this new school. ... Yes, it will be an historical work, and it is the dream of my life. I do not believe in opera based on gods and myths. That is the fault of the German school. It is metaphysical music – it is philosophy. What we want are plots that give rise to characters of flesh and blood, with human emotions and human passions. Music should speak to the heart, and not to the head. Such a work as I contemplate will take some time."

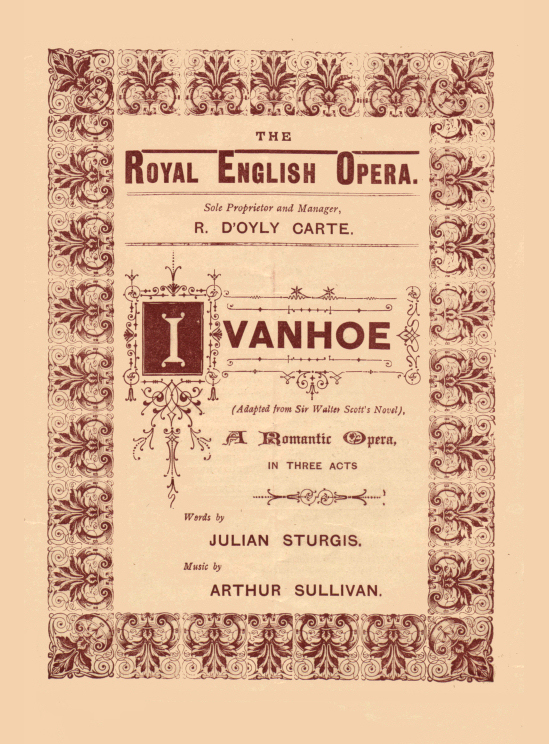
Standard programme cover

During the late 1870s and through the 1880s, Richard D'Oyly Carte had earned great success by producing the Gilbert and Sullivan operas. By the late 1880s, perhaps encouraged by the operas produced by Carl Rosa, Carte aspired to do for grand opera what he had done for comic opera, with the assistance of Arthur Sullivan, who had long yearned to compose more serious works. In May 1888, Sullivan noted in his diary that, after a performance of his cantata The Golden Legend given at Albert Hall by command of Queen Victoria, the queen said to him, "You ought to write a grand opera – you would do it so well!" Carte began building the Royal English Opera House in December 1888, and he commissioned Sullivan to write the venture's inaugural work. George Bernard Shaw wondered, in August 1889, about the wisdom of building a new opera house when the three existing ones (Royal Opera House, Her Majesty's Theatre and the Theatre Royal, Drury Lane), were underutilised. During 1890, Carte contacted several composers, including Frederick Cowen, asking them to compose operas to succeed Ivanhoe in the new house.

Sullivan asked his usual collaborator W. S. Gilbert to supply the libretto for a grand opera, but Gilbert declined, writing that in grand opera the librettist's role is subordinate to that of the composer, and that the public would, in any case, not accept a serious work from his pen. Gilbert recommended Julian Sturgis to write the libretto. Sturgis had written the libretto for Nadeshda by Arthur Thomas (1885), which had been produced with success by Carl Rosa. Ivanhoe had been treated operatically previously, including an 1826 pastiche opera with music by Rossini and operas by Marschner in 1829, Pacini in 1832 and Nicolai in 1840. Both Sullivan and the critics noted that Scott's novel, with its many scenes, would make for a complex adaptation. Sturgis set to work on Ivanhoe in the spring or early summer of 1889. The libretto uses some of the language directly from the novel and does not change the basic story. However, in condensing the lengthy and action-packed novel for a stage work, the libretto relies on the audience's knowledge of the novel and omits many scenes, also entirely omitting the characters of Gurth the Swineherd, Oswald, Cedric's manservant, some of King John's advisors, and Athelstane the Unready, among others. Richard Traubner, writes in Opera News, that "Sturgis's libretto, given his quotes from Scott and the quasi-medieval English, is still sketchy, and the complex story does not really move forward with any operatic satisfaction."

While Sturgis worked on Ivanhoe, Sullivan was composing The Gondoliers, with a libretto by Gilbert, for the Savoy Theatre. After The Gondoliers opened and Sullivan took his annual holiday in Monte Carlo, he finally began the composition of Ivanhoe in May 1890, finishing the score in December 1890. Chorus rehearsals for Ivanhoe began in November, with Alfred Cellier as chorus master, and his brother François Cellier, who became musical director of the new theatre. In April 1890, Gilbert had challenged Carte over partnership expenses at the Savoy Theatre, including a new carpet for the lobby. To Gilbert's surprise and indignation, Sullivan sided with Carte – after all, Carte was producing his opera – and Gilbert sued Carte and Sullivan in May. The lawsuit was ongoing during much of the period of composition of Ivanhoe, and Sullivan wrote to Gilbert in September 1890 that he was "physically and mentally ill over this wretched business. I have not yet got over the shock of seeing our names coupled ... in hostile antagonism over a few miserable pounds". Sullivan completed the score too late to meet Carte's planned production date, and costs mounted as the producer had to pay performers, crew and others, while the theatre sat empty. Sullivan was required to pay Carte a contractual penalty of £3,000 for his delay.

== Production and aftermath ==
Hawes Craven's scenery for Ivanhoe

Ivanhoe and The Royal English Opera House opened on 31 January 1891, with the Prince and Princess of Wales and other members of the royal family in attendance. The production was lavish: An orchestra of 64 players, 72 choristers and 120 supernumeraries were employed. Percy Anderson designed the costumes, Hawes Craven and others designed the sets, staging was by Hugh Moss, and François Cellier and Ernest Ford alternated as conductors. Ford also arranged the piano score for Ivanhoe. In the opening night programme, Carte set forth his goals:

I am endeavouring to establish English Grand Opera at the New Theatre which I have built.... Whether [the experiment] will succeed or not depends on whether there is a sufficient number of persons interested in music and the drama who will come forward and fill the theatre.... I have made arrangements with other distinguished composers and authors to write operas to follow Ivanhoe, which operas will be produced if the enterprise is a pecuniary success. The intention is to 'run' each opera, that is to say, to play it six times a week, at any rate at first. This is the only way in which the expenditure necessary to secure a proper representation in the matter of scenery and costumes can be recouped.... It rests with [the public] whether a National Opera House shall be established on a permanent basis or not.

Thus, departing from the usual practice for grand opera to be presented in repertory, Carte presented Ivanhoe every night, with alternative singers being provided for the chief roles – not as separate 'first' and 'second' casts, but in different mixtures. One cast member who went on to a fine career was the young tenor, Joseph O'Mara, in the title role. R. Scott Fishe, a member of the chorus, later became a principal performer with the D'Oyly Carte Opera Company at the Savoy Theatre. No expense was spared to make the production a success, including "every imaginable effect of scenic splendour". The opera ran for an unprecedented 155 consecutive performances and had strong revenues at first. It received very favourable press, with a few reports expressing reservations about the libretto. Of more than a dozen opening night reviews, only Shaw's and Fuller Maitland's reviews were negative.

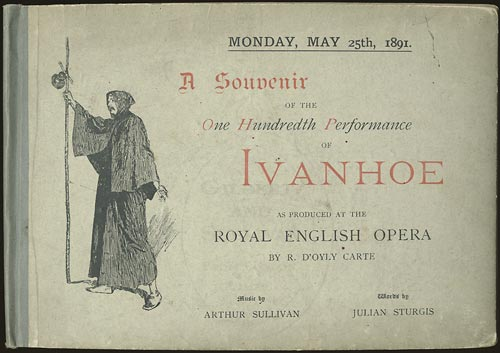
Souvenir of 100th performance

Ivanhoe closed in July, when the opera house closed for the summer at the end of the opera season. When the house re-opened in November, after a delay, Carte produced André Messager's La Basoche (with David Bispham in his first London stage performance) alternating in repertory with six more performances of Ivanhoe (which ran at a substantial loss this time), and then La Basoche alone, closing in January 1892. Though praised, La Basoche could not fill the large house, and losses were mounting. Carte had commissioned new operas from Cowen, Thomas, Herman Bemberg and Hamish MacCunn.. Although Bemberg's opera Elaine was finished, and Cowen's Signa would be completed in March, Carte evidently had decided that producing these would be impracticable or too expensive and that he could not make a success of the new house. The Pall Mall Gazette wrote, "The question, then, uppermost is whether Londoners really want English opera at all.... Mr D'Oyly Carte is to be pitied, and it is hard to see how he can continue to throw his operatic pearls before those who do not value them. After all, the Englishman's opera-house is the music-hall."

Notwithstanding Ivanhoe's initial success, the opera house was a failure, and later writers unfairly blamed Ivanhoe for this failure. It was, as critic Herman Klein observed, "the strangest comingling of success and failure ever chronicled in the history of British lyric enterprise!" Sir Henry Wood, who had been répétiteur for the production of Ivanhoe, recalled in his autobiography that "[if] Carte had had a repertory of six operas instead of only one, I believe he would have established English opera in London for all time. Towards the end of the run of Ivanhoe I was already preparing the Flying Dutchman with Eugène Oudin in the name part. He would have been superb. However, plans were altered and the Dutchman was shelved." After a season of performances by Sarah Bernhardt, Carte was forced to sell the theatre. A consortium led by Sir Augustus Harris purchased the house, renaming it the Palace Music Hall and later the Palace Theatre of Varieties. The building is known today as the Palace Theatre.

There was a successful touring revival of Ivanhoe by the Carl Rosa Opera Company from December 1894 to June 1895 in a cut version (the opera originally ran almost four hours). The cast changed during the tour; at some performances the role of Maurice de Bracy was taken by W. H. Stephens, who had created the role of Locksley at the Royal English Opera House. Carl Rosa again toured the piece later in 1895, and at some performances (for example at the Royal Court Theatre, Liverpool, on 21 March 1896) Rebecca was sung by Esther Palliser, who had played Rowena (and later Rebecca) in London in 1891. A production in Berlin in November 1895 generated no further interest, but a concert performance was given at the Crystal Palace in 1903. Afterwards, apart from two performances in Sir Thomas Beecham's 1910 season at the Royal Opera House, Ivanhoe disappeared from the professional repertory, except for a week of performances in New York City at the Park Theatre by The Society of American Singers in 1919. The opera was broadcast twice on BBC Radio in 1929, with the London Wireless Orchestra conducted by Percy Pitt, who had conducted the 1910 performances. Stanford Robinson conducted another broadcast between the wars. The few modern performances of the music have included a 1973 revival by Joseph Vandernoot and his Beaufort Opera, which was recorded and broadcast by the BBC, and a concert by the Boston Academy of Music on 23 November 1991.

== Roles and original cast ==
Drawing of scenes from Ivanhoe

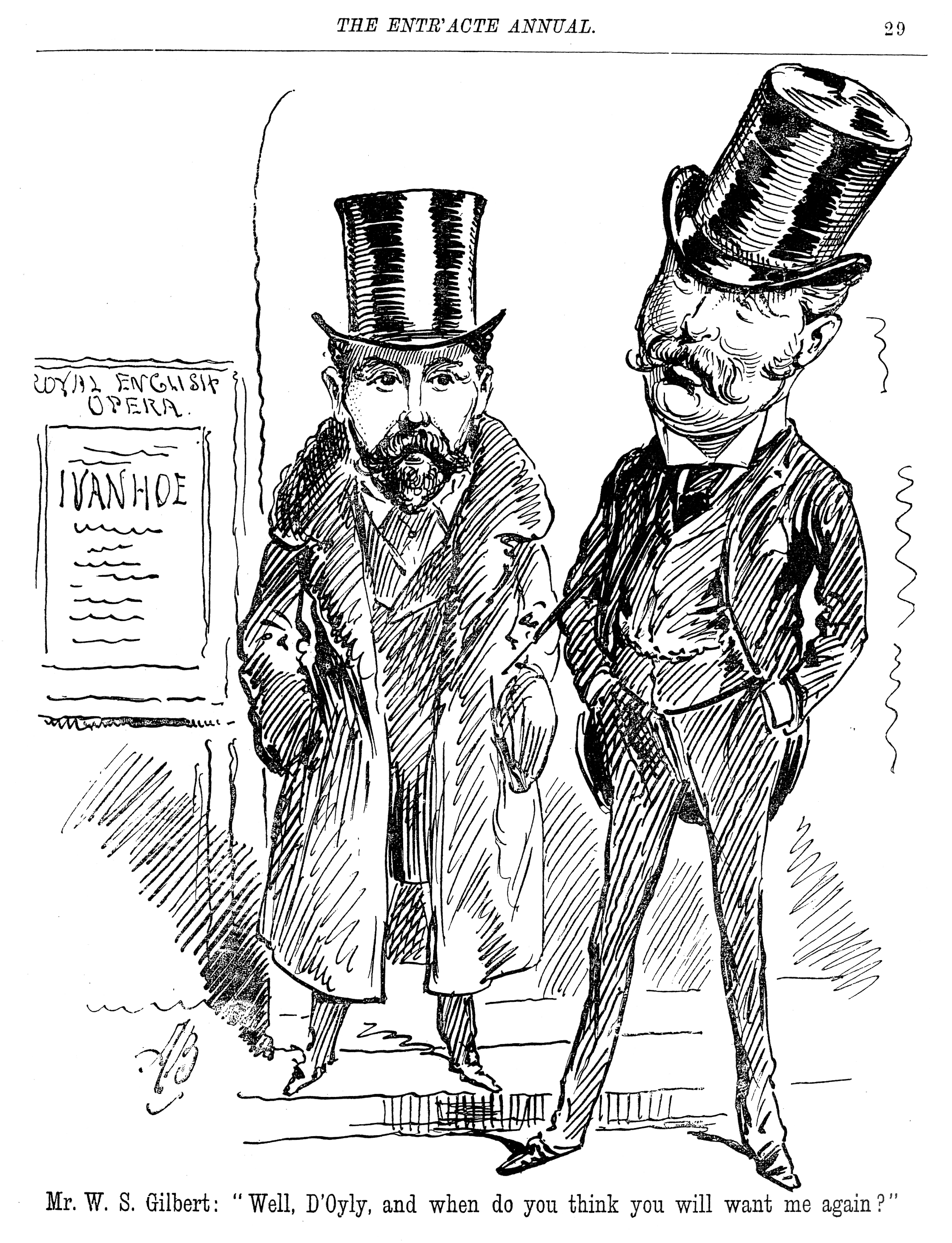
Gilbert, depicted as feeling left out

Below are listed the roles in the opera. Alternative singers were provided for the chief roles – not as separate 'first' and 'second' casts, but in different mixtures:

- Richard Coeur-de-Lion, King of England (Disguised as the Black Knight) (bass) – Norman Salmond and Franklin Clive
- Prince John (baritone) – Richard Green and Wallace Brownlow
- Sir Brian de Bois Guilbert (Commander of the Knights Templar) (baritone) – Eugène Oudin, François Noije and Richard Green
- Maurice de Bracy – Charles Kenningham (tenor) (all performances)
- Lucas de Beaumanoir (Grand Master of the Templars) (bass-baritone) – Adams Owen (all performances)
- Cedric the Saxon (Thane of Rotherwood) (bass-baritone) – David Ffrangcon-Davies and W. H. Burgon
- Wilfred, Knight of Ivanhoe (His son, disguised as a Palmer) (tenor) – Ben Davies and Joseph O'Mara
- Friar Tuck – Avon Saxon (bass-baritone) (all performances)
- Isaac of York – Charles Copland (bass) (all performances)
- Locksley – W. H. Stephens (tenor) (all performances)
- The Squire – Frederick Bovill (baritone) (all performances)
- Wamba, Jester to Cedric – Mr. Cowis (non-singing role) (all performances)
- The Lady Rowena (Ward of Cedric) (soprano) – Esther Palliser, Lucille Hill and Medora Henson.
- Ulrica – Marie Groebl (mezzo-soprano) (all performances)
- Rebecca (Daughter of Isaac of York) (soprano) – Margaret Macintyre and Charlotte Thudichum

== Synopsis ==
In 1891, the audience knew Scott's best-selling novel intimately. Sullivan and Sturgis relied on this fact, and so the opera intentionally dramatises disconnected scenes from the book and does not attempt to retell the whole story. This presents a challenge to modern audiences who may be far less familiar with the story.

=== Act 1 ===
Scene 1: The Hall of Cedric of Rotherwood. Evening.

As Cedric's men prepare supper, he laments the King's many journeys abroad, the scurrilous behaviour of the Norman knights, and the absence of his estranged son, Ivanhoe. Isaac of York, a Jew, enters and asks for shelter. Although Cedric considers Jews to be accursed, he offers Isaac hospitality according to the Saxon tradition. A squire announces Sir Brian de Bois Guilbert, of the Knights Templar, and Maurice de Bracy, a knight and advisor to Prince John, who are on their way to a Royal tournament at Ashby de la Zouche. They are Normans, and Cedric, a Saxon, loathes them. However, they too are granted hospitality. Ivanhoe is with them, in disguise. De Bracy asks after Cedric's fair ward, Rowena. Cedric replies hotly that his ward will only marry a Saxon. Ivanhoe tells of a tournament he witnessed in the Holy Land where the English knights soundly defeated the Templars. Sir Brian was beaten by Ivanhoe, whom he wishes to challenge again. Rowena and the disguised Ivanhoe, whom no one recognises, assure Sir Brian that Ivanhoe will meet his challenge. After Rowena exits, Sir Brian and de Bracy agree that they will abduct her after the tournament at Ashby.

Scene 2: An Ante-Chamber in the Hall at Rotherwood

Rowena laments the absence of her lover, Ivanhoe. He enters, still disguised as a holy palmer. She tells him that she hopes to be with Ivanhoe again. Ivanhoe tells Isaac that he has overheard Sir Brian planning to seize him the next day. Isaac promises to equip Ivanhoe (whom he recognises as a knight) with a horse and armour, and Ivanhoe in turn promises that, if they fly Cedric's hall directly, Isaac will be safe with him. They leave for the tournament at Ashby.

Scene 3: The Tournament at Ashby

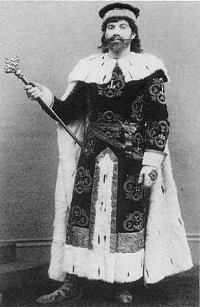
Richard Green as Prince John

At the tournament, King Richard, disguised as the Black Knight, has made a great impression with his victories. Prince John enters with Rowena, who has been named Queen of Beauty for the tournament. The Prince shrugs off a message that his brother, the King, has escaped from France. The Prince asks for challengers to the Norman knights. Ivanhoe, now in disguise as the Disinherited Knight, challenges Sir Brian. In a fierce clash, Ivanhoe again defeats Sir Brian, but is himself wounded. Ignoring Ivanhoe's protest, a Herald removes his helmet at Prince John's command so that he may be crowned victor of the tournament, and he is recognised by Cedric and Rowena.

=== Act 2 ===
Scene 1: Friar Tuck's Hut, in the Forest at Copmanhurst

King Richard, who is in hiding after his escape, shares a feast with Friar Tuck and challenges him to a song contest. The King sings "I ask nor wealth nor courtier's praise", while the Friar sings "Ho, jolly Jenkin" (which is the most popular detached excerpt from the opera). Locksley (Robin Hood) enters with the urgent message that Cedric and Rowena have been captured by de Bracy and Sir Brian, and the wounded Ivanhoe, travelling with Isaac and his beautiful daughter Rebecca, have also been captured. All are imprisoned at Torquilstone. The King, Locksley, Friar Tuck and all the outlaws rush off to rescue them.

Scene 2: A Passageway in Torquilstone

Cedric and Rowena are prisoners, and De Bracy plans to forcibly marry her. De Bracy tells them that Ivanhoe, Isaac and Rebecca, are also prisoners. He promises that Ivanhoe will be safe if Rowena and Cedric comply with his wishes. Cedric is prepared to sacrifice Ivanhoe, but Rowena begs him to be merciful to them, as well as to Ivanhoe. She appeals to his honour, as a Knight and, begging him to save Ivanhoe, she promises to pray for de Bracy. After they have left, Sir Brian enters, and declares passionately his intention to woo, and win, Rebecca.

Scene 3: A Turret Chamber in Torquilstone

Ulrica warns Rebecca that she faces an evil and dark fate, and that death is the only path to safety. The despondent Rebecca prays for God's protection. Sir Brian enters, intent on winning Rebecca. He asks her to submit to him, promising to raise her to the throne of kings and to cover her with jewels. She utterly rejects him and leaps on the parapet, threatening to jump. A bugle sounds, heralding the arrival of King Richard and his forces. Sir Brian rushes off to defend the castle.

=== Act 3 ===
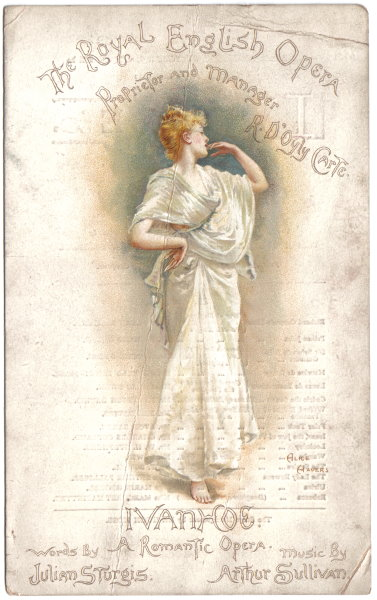
First night souvenir programme cover

Scene 1: A Room in Torquilstone

Ivanhoe, pale and weak from his wounds, thinks of his love for Rowena, and falls asleep. Rebecca, who is in love with Ivanhoe, enters to tend him. When they hear distant trumpets, Rebecca goes to a window and describes the unfolding battle to the frustrated Ivanhoe, who complains that he is unable to participate. Ulrica sets the castle on fire. Sir Brian enters and carries off Rebecca. Ivanhoe is unable to protect her. At the last minute, King Richard enters the chamber and rescues Ivanhoe from the conflagration.

Scene 2: In the Forest

King Richard and Ivanhoe rest in a forest. De Bracy has been captured. The King sends him to Prince John with an ultimatum to surrender. Cedric and Rowena appear. At the King's urging, Cedric is reconciled with Ivanhoe and agrees to Ivanhoe's marriage with Rowena. Isaac enters in haste. The Templars have accused Rebecca of witchcraft for supposedly bewitching the Christian Knight to betray his Order and his vows, and making him fall in love with an accursed Jewess. They have sentenced her to burn at the stake. Ivanhoe rushes out to rescue her.

Scene 3: The Preceptory of the Templars, Templestowe

The funeral pyre has been built. Rebecca will be burned at the stake unless a champion is willing to fight for her. Sir Brian urges them to relent, but the Templars take his irrational passion as further evidence of her witchcraft. Sir Brian offers to save her if she will agree to be his, but Rebecca refuses. Rebecca is bound to the stake. The exhausted Ivanhoe arrives with his sword drawn, offering to fight for her. Rebecca tries to dissuade him, fearing that the wounded knight cannot prevail. Sir Brian attacks Ivanhoe, who appears to be beaten. But as Sir Brian is about to strike the fatal blow, he falls dead, unable to survive the evil passions warring in his soul. The Templars regard this as proof of God's judgement and Rebecca's innocence, and she is freed. She gazes wistfully at Ivanhoe as he is reunited with Rowena, who has entered with Cedric and King Richard. The King banishes the Templars from English soil.

== Music ==
The Gramophone calls Ivanhoe "one of the most important works in the history of British opera". The Gramophone quoted conductor David Lloyd-Jones as saying that in writing the opera,

"Sullivan ... was very much in touch with all the music of his time.... There are bits which are definitely Wagnerian: the use of dotted rhythms, always in 4/4 time – you get the whiff of Meistersinger or Lohengrin, I think. There is, also, for example, a remarkable duet at the end of act 2, I would say Verdian in its sweep. There are, of course, the stand-up arias, never a full ensemble until right at the end. Rebecca's aria is a very interesting piece. Whenever she is singing he uses the cor anglais to stress the sort of Eastern quality, and Sullivan claimed that this theme was one he had heard as a student in Leipzig, when he had attended a service at the Synagogue there. You can tell, and he quickly establishes it in the music, that he was not writing an operetta! Look at this, very early on, some virtuoso stuff. It needs a really accomplished orchestra. He had always been cramped by the small orchestra, only ever one oboe, that he had to make do with at the Savoy. Here he was really able to expand, you can feel it in the music."

Richard Traubner, writing in Opera News, disagrees: "Ivanhoe ... reflects the ballad-rich British grand operas Sullivan grew up with, by Balfe (The Bohemian Girl) or Wallace (Maritana). The skill and flair Sullivan exhibits in the Savoy operettas in humor, gaiety and superb word-setting are barely required in Ivanhoe. It sounds instead like an extension of the hoary oratorio form popular in Victorian Britain ... with its plethora of hymn-like numbers interspersed with ballads of no particular interest and some strong ensembles." Traubner continues, "Sullivan's score would have been wonderful for a film, with its numerous Korngoldian fanfares and stirring, very English-national choruses. The long drinking scene in act 1, with its 'Glory to those who fight for the true Cross', and the 'Ho, Jolly Jenkin' ensemble with Friar Tuck, also referring to drinking, are the most exciting things in the opera. Sadly, the dramatic arias required for an opera to achieve universal popularity are largely absent. ... Rebecca's prayer does have a certain Near Eastern aroma".

== Recordings and books ==
There have been few recordings of the opera. The 1973 revival by Beaufort Opera production was recorded and broadcast on 29 November 1973 by BBC Radio London. A 1989 recording was made by The Prince Consort. A 1995-hour-long "compressed version" was recorded and presented by Roderic Dunnett (the Opera Now magazine reviewer) for his BBC Radio 3 Britannia at the Opera series. Beyond that, a 1998 CD, Sullivan & Co.: The Operas That Got Away features two songs from the opera, and two of the soprano arias were recorded by Deborah Riedel with Richard Bonynge and the Opera Australia orchestra on The Power of Love – British Opera Arias (1999, Melba MR 30110).

Cover of 2010 CD

The first complete, fully professional recording of Ivanhoe was released in February 2010, with David Lloyd-Jones conducting the BBC National Orchestra of Wales, on the Chandos Records label. The cast features Toby Spence, Neal Davies, Geraldine McGreevy and Janice Watson. The BBC's review of the album concludes, "This new account, boasting a strong cast of top British singers, is thoroughly committed, with vibrant playing from the BBC National Orchestra of Wales under the steady hand of David Lloyd-Jones. There are a few passages where inspiration seems to flag – either from composer or conductor – but in general this is a terrific achievement. From the lively pomp of the jousting scene, with its brilliant double chorus, to moments of exquisite tenderness and passion, to thrilling battles and powerful drama, this recording makes a compelling case for a monumental work that deserves a modern audience." The album charted at #5 on the Specialist Classical Chart for the week ending 6 February 2010 Andrew Lamb wrote in The Gramophone that the success of the recording is due to Lloyd-Jones's "dramatic pacing", that the three key roles of Ivanhoe, Rebecca and Sir Brian are well cast. Raymond Walker agreed: "David Lloyd-Jones must be congratulated for the energetic pace he sets, never rushed but always advancing in a purposeful way." He also praised the singers and chorus. Richard Traubner was a dissenting voice. Though he praised the singers, he felt that many of the tempi were too rushed.

In 2007, the Sir Arthur Sullivan Society published a booklet containing information about the opera including original articles, contemporary reviews and news articles. In 2008, a book was published about Ivanhoe and its 19th-century "precursors" by Jeff S. Dailey, based on his 2002 doctoral dissertation for New York University. Dailey offers explanations of why Scott's novels, Ivanhoe in particular, were frequently adapted. He discusses the text and music of the opera. In the chapter on criticism of the opera (Chapter 9), he notes that Ivanhoe received generally favourable reviews early on, except from George Bernard Shaw, but that later critics, some of whom probably never saw the work, tended to be dismissive.

In 2008, Robin Gordon-Powell edited a full score and orchestral parts for the opera, published by The Amber Ring. Since the original performance materials were destroyed in the 1964 fire at the Chappell & Co. warehouse, an authentic score and parts had not been available. This score was used by Chandos in the 2010 recording.
