= Paul Zuckerman =

American industrialist

Paul Zuckerman (1912 – 8 January 1986), also known as the Peanut Butter King was a Turkish-American food industrialist, philanthropist, and Jewish community leader best known for founding the Velvet Peanut Butter brand and building one of the largest independent peanut-butter manufacturers in the United States.

== Early life and education ==
Paul Zuckerman was born in Istanbul, Turkey and at the age of two, was brought to the United States. The family settled in Chicago then moved to Detroit when he was young. He eventually attended Wayne State University and the University of Detroit.

== Velvet Peanut Butter Company ==
In 1937, he borrowed about $1,500 and bought second-hand machinery and started making peanut butter in his garage in Detroit. The business became the "Velvet Nut Products Company" producing "Velvet Peanut Butter".

In 1948, he got a United States government contract to supply 1.5 million pounds of peanut butter to schools. In 1952, he acquired the Krun-Chee Potato Chips Company and later merged with Sunshine Biscuit Company and eventually merged with O'Donnell Importing Company to form the "Velvet-O'Donnell Corporation".

By the 1960s, Velvet was the largest independent peanut-butter manufacturer in the United States.

In 1984, he sold the company.

== Philanthropy ==
Zuckerman later became known for his philanthropic endeavors. From 1974 till 1977, he served as President of the United Jewish Appeal and served as chairman of major fundraising campaigns supporting Israel.

He donated to the Paul and Helen Zuckerman Auditorium in Sinai Hospital, Detroit, was involved in the board of the Ben-Gurion University of the Negev and involved in the Jewish Welfare Federation, American ORT, and other charities. President Lyndon B. Johnson appointed him to lead the Food for Peace Committee in Michigan.

== Personal life ==
Zuckerman had a wife, Helen Zuckerman and with her he had two children: Norbert Zuckerman and Linda Klein.

Zuckerman died in Harper Hospital, Detroit on 8 January 1986, at the age of 73 of cancer. The Israeli prime minister Shimon Peres sent condolences praising his support for Israel.
