= Palace Theatre, London =

West End theatre in London

Palace Theatre
- Royal English Opera House; Palace Theatre of Varieties
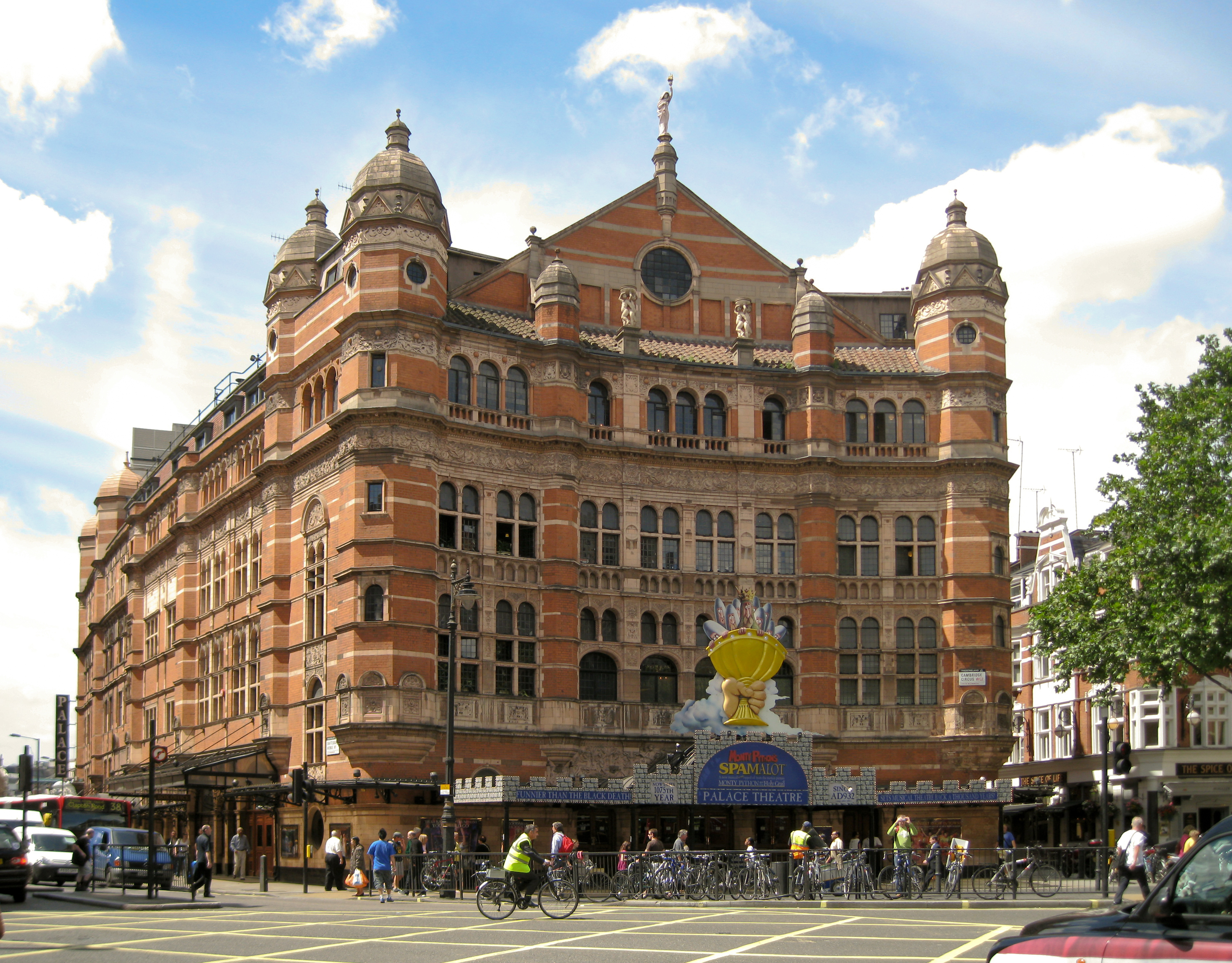
- The Palace Theatre

- Location within Central London
- Address: Shaftesbury Avenue; London, W1; United Kingdom
- Coordinates: 51°30′47″N 00°07′47″W
- Owner: Nimax Theatres
- Capacity: 1,400 (4 levels)
- Type: West End theatre
- Designation: Grade II*
- Production: Harry Potter and the Cursed Child
- Public transit: Leicester Square

Construction
- Opened: January 1891; 135 years ago
- Rebuilt: 1892 (conversion by Walter Emden)
- Architect: Thomas Edward Collcutt

Website
- Palace Theatre official website

The Palace Theatre is a West End theatre in the City of Westminster in London. Its red-brick facade dominates the west side of Cambridge Circus behind a small plaza near the intersection of Shaftesbury Avenue and Charing Cross Road. The Palace Theatre seats 1,400.

Richard D'Oyly Carte, producer of the Gilbert and Sullivan operas, commissioned the theatre in the late 1880s. It was designed by Thomas Edward Collcutt and intended to be a home of English grand opera. The theatre opened as the Royal English Opera House in January 1891 with a lavish production of Arthur Sullivan's opera Ivanhoe. Although this ran for 160 performances, followed briefly by André Messager's La Basoche, Carte had no other works ready to fill the theatre. He leased it to Sarah Bernhardt for a season and sold the opera house within a year at a loss. It was then converted into a grand music hall and renamed the Palace Theatre of Varieties, managed successfully first by Sir Augustus Harris and then by Charles Morton. In 1897, the theatre began to screen films as part of its programme of entertainment. In 1904, Alfred Butt became manager and continued to combine variety entertainment, including dancing girls, with films. Herman Finck was musical director at the theatre from 1900 until 1920.

In 1925, the musical comedy No, No, Nanette opened at the Palace Theatre, followed by other musicals, for which the theatre became known. The Marx Brothers appeared at the theatre in 1931, performing selections from their Broadway shows. The Sound of Music ran for 2,385 performances at the theatre, opening in 1961. Jesus Christ Superstar ran from 1972 to 1980, and Les Misérables played at the theatre for nineteen years, beginning in 1985. In 1983, Andrew Lloyd Webber purchased the theatre and by 1991 had refurbished it. Monty Python's Spamalot played there from 2006 until January 2009, and Priscilla Queen of the Desert opened in March 2009 and closed in December 2011. Between February 2012 and June 2013, the Palace hosted a production of Singin' in the Rain.

From June 2016, the play Harry Potter and the Cursed Child has run at the theatre. Performances were suspended in March 2020 owing to the COVID-19 pandemic and resumed on 14 October 2021.

== History ==
=== Early years ===
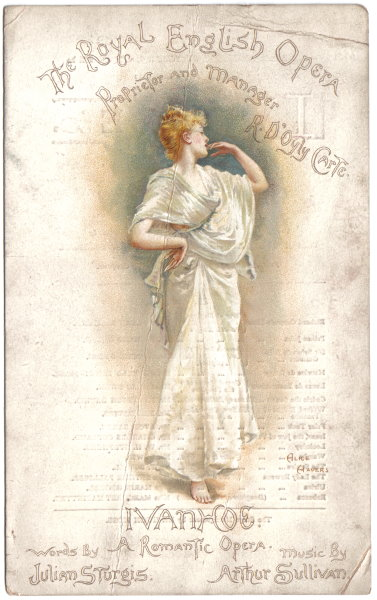
Ivanhoe programme cover from the theatre's first night

Commissioned by impresario Richard D'Oyly Carte in the late 1880s, the theatre was designed by Thomas Edward Collcutt. Carte intended it to be the home of English grand opera, much as his Savoy Theatre had been built as a home for English light opera, beginning with the Gilbert and Sullivan series. The foundation stone, laid by his wife Helen in 1888, can still be seen on the façade of the theatre, almost at ground level to the right of the entrance. The theatre's design was considered to be novel. The upper levels are supported by heavy steel cantilevers built into the back walls, removing the need for supporting pillars that impede the view of the stage. The tiers, corridors, staircases, landings are all constructed of concrete to reduce the risk and damage that might be done by fire.

The theatre opened as the Royal English Opera House in January 1891 with Arthur Sullivan's Ivanhoe. No expense was spared to make the production a success, including a double cast and "every imaginable effect of scenic splendour". It ran for 160 performances, but when Ivanhoe finally closed in July, Carte had no new work to replace it, and the opera house had to close. One opera is not enough to sustain an opera house venture. It was, as the critic Herman Klein observed, "the strangest comingling of success and failure ever chronicled in the history of British lyric enterprise!" Sir Henry Wood, who had been répétiteur for the production, recalled in his autobiography that "[if] Carte had had a repertory of six operas instead of only one, I believe he would have established English opera in London for all time. Towards the end of the run of Ivanhoe I was already preparing the Flying Dutchman with Eugène Oudin in the name part. He would have been superb. However, plans were altered and the Dutchman was shelved."

The theatre re-opened in November 1891, with André Messager's La Basoche (with David Bispham in his first London stage performance) at first alternating in repertory with Ivanhoe, and then La Basoche alone, closing in January 1892. Carte had no other works ready, and so he leased the theatre to Sarah Bernhardt for a season, and after months of negotiation he sold the opera house at a loss to the new Palace Theatre Company, headed by Sir Augustus Harris. The architect Walter Emden converted the opera house into a grand and ornate music hall, which was renamed the Palace Theatre of Varieties. Harris's opening programme included a lavish and highly praised ballet, with music by Gaston Serpette; he engaged some of the best variety turns then available, before handing over the day-to-day running of the theatre to Charles Morton, known as the "Father of the Music Halls", whose biographers record:

Eschewing the heavier kind of variety and theatrical fare ... the new manager found means to present programmes of extraordinary diversity. In addition to engaging many of the leading variety stars ... he also secured many a distinguished singer who had hitherto confined his, or her, services to the concert platform. In due course, Morton added to the Palace programme a series of very beautiful and very striking tableaux vivants, which became the talk of London.

Denied permission by the London County Council to construct a promenade, which was a popular feature of adult entertainment at the Empire and Alhambra theatres, (Note: The Oxford English Dictionary defines such a promenade as "An area without seats at a theatre or concert venue; specifically a gallery at a music hall, commonly thought to be frequented by prostitutes and their clients".) the Palace countered with its tableaux vivants, which featured apparently nude women (though patrons were reassured that they were actually wearing flesh toned body stockings). In March 1897, the theatre began to screen films from the American Biograph Company as part of its programme of entertainment. These films pioneered the 70 mm format which helped give an exceptionally large and clear image filling the proscenium arch. The performances included early newsreels from around the world, many of them made by film pioneer William Kennedy Laurie Dickson, including film of the Boer War (1900). The Palace continued to show films as part of its variety and musical programmes.

=== 20th century ===
In 1904, Morton was succeeded as manager by his deputy, Alfred Butt. Butt introduced many innovations, including dancers such as Maud Allan, who created something of a sensation with her Vision of Salome, and Anna Pavlova, and the elegant pianist-singer Margaret Cooper. Oliver G Pike premièred his first film, In Birdland, at the theatre in August 1907. This was the first British wildlife film to be screened to a paying audience. On 26 February 1909, the general public first saw Kinemacolor in a programme of 21 short films shown at the theatre.

The name of the theatre was finally changed to The Palace Theatre in 1911. Herman Finck was musical director from 1900 until 1920, and made many recordings with the theatre's orchestra. The theatre was famous not only for its orchestra, but also for the beautiful Palace Girls, for whom Finck composed many dances. In 1911, the Palace Girls performed a song and dance number, which was originally called Tonight but became very popular as a romantic instrumental piece In The Shadows. In 1912, the theatre hosted the first Royal Variety Performance in Britain, commanded by King George V, and produced by Butt. During the First World War, the theatre presented revues, and Maurice Chevalier became known to British audiences. After the war, the theatre was used mostly for films for a few years.

On 11 March 1925, the musical comedy No, No, Nanette opened at the Palace Theatre starring Binnie Hale and George Grossmith Jr. The run of 665 performances made it the third longest-running West End musical of the 1920s. Princess Charming ran for 362 performances beginning in 1926. The Palace Theatre was also the venue for Rodgers and Hart's The Girl Friend (1927) and Fred Astaire's final stage musical Gay Divorce (1933). The Marx Brothers appeared at the theatre in 1931, performing selections from their Broadway shows. The theatre was twice threatened with demolition in the early 1930s; offers of £400,000 and £450,000 were made for the site: one offer was from an American chain which proposed to build a department store on the site, but the directors, led by C. B. Cochran refused to sell.

In 1939–1940, Cicely Courtneidge and Jack Hulbert appeared at the Palace in Under Your Hat, a comedy spy story co-written by Hulbert, with music and lyrics by Vivian Ellis, which ran for 512 performances. Later musical theatre works that played with success at the theatre included Song of Norway (1946, 525 performances), King's Rhapsody (1949, 841 performances), Where's Charley? (1958, 380 performances), and Flower Drum Song (1960) among others. The Entertainer, starring Laurence Olivier, transferred to the theatre from the Royal Court Theatre in 1957. In the 1960s, The Sound of Music ran for 2,386 performances, from 1961, and Cabaret followed in 1968 (336 performances). The Danny La Rue revue Danny at the Palace (1970) ran for 811 performances. The theatre was Grade II*listed by English Heritage in June 1960.

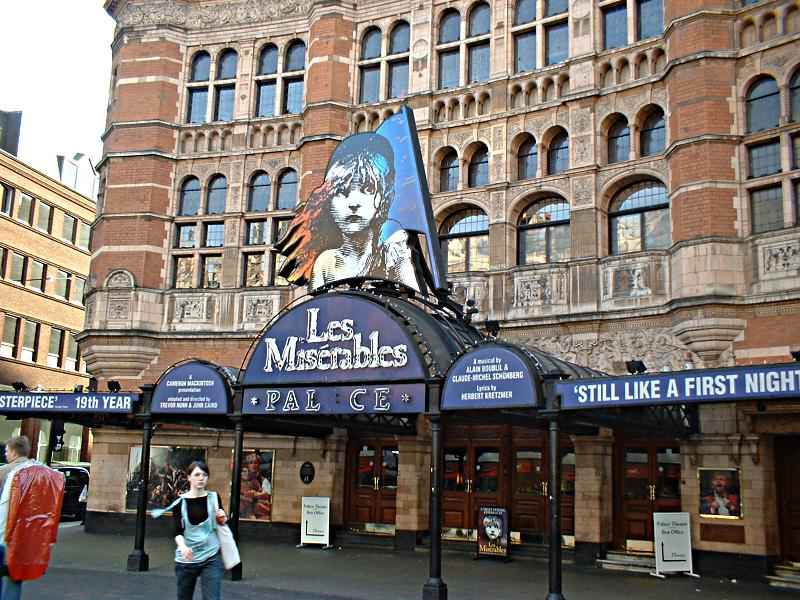
Les Misérables played at the Palace Theatre from 1985 to 2004

Two exceptional runs took place at the Palace during the last decades of the 20th century: Jesus Christ Superstar (3,358 performances from 1972 to 1980) and Les Misérables, which played at the theatre for nineteen years after moving from the Barbican Centre on 4 December 1985. The production moved to the Queen's Theatre (now the Sondheim Theatre) in April 2004 to continue its record-setting run. In between, Song and Dance played from 1982 to 1984. In 1983, Andrew Lloyd Webber purchased the theatre for £1.3 million and began a series of renovations to the auditorium. He restored the theatre's facade, later commenting: "I removed the huge neon sign that defaced the glorious terracotta exterior, much to the chagrin of West End producers who told me I had removed the greatest theatre advertising sight in London."

=== 21st century ===
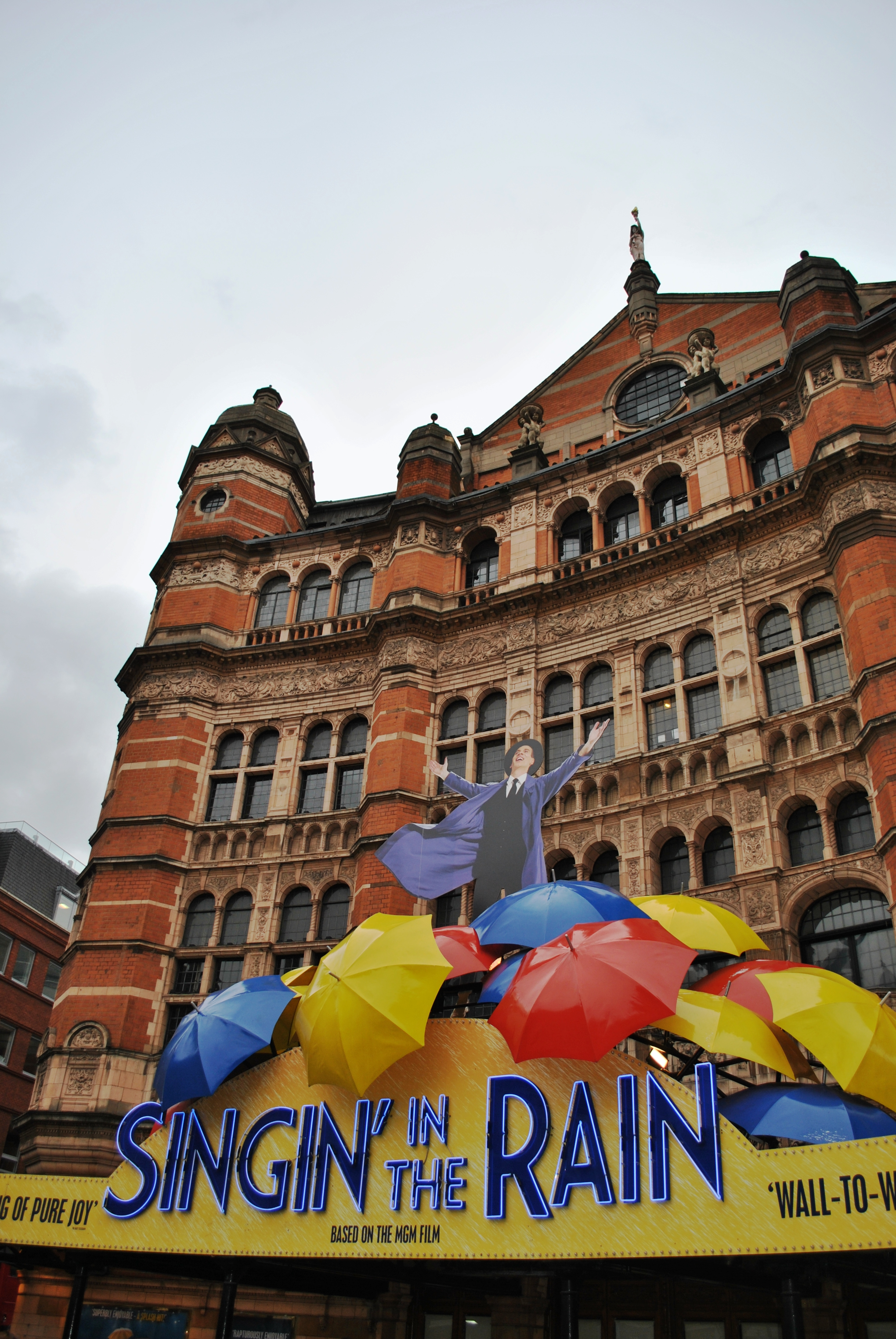
Singin' in the Rain at the Palace Theatre, London

After Les Misérables left the theatre in 2004, Lloyd Webber refurbished and restored the auditorium and front of the house, removing the paint that covered the onyx and Italian marble. He premiered his musical The Woman in White at the Palace later in 2004, which ran for 19 months. Monty Python's Spamalot ran from 2006 until 2009, replaced by Priscilla Queen of the Desert through 2011. Singin' in the Rain played from 2012 to 2013. It was one of the 40 theatres featured in the 2012 DVD documentary series Great West End Theatres, presented by Donald Sinden. In 2012, Lloyd Webber's Really Useful Group sold the building to Nimax Theatres, which purchased the Apollo, Duchess, Garrick and Lyric Theatres from Really Useful in 2005. The next show was The Commitments from 2013 to 2015.

Harry Potter and the Cursed Child, a two-part play by Jack Thorne based on an original story by Thorne, J. K. Rowling and John Tiffany, began previews at the theatre in June 2016 and opened on 30 July. The production was suspended in March 2020 due to the COVID-19 pandemic and reopened in October 2021.

In August 2024, a double-decker bus crashed into the canopy on the side of the building; there were no injuries, and performances at the theatre were not expected to be interrupted.

== In popular culture ==
In the 1977 Doctor Who serial The Talons of Weng-Chiang, the villain Li H'sen Chang masquerades as magician and ventriloquist performing at the Palace Theatre when the Doctor brings Leela there to discover the customs of her Victorian ancestors. In the 2004 novel Full Dark House, by Christopher Fowler, a series of gruesome murders take place in the Palace during the London Blitz amid a production of Orpheus in the Underworld.

== Nearby tube stations ==
- Leicester Square
- Tottenham Court Road

== Notes, references and sources ==
=== Sources ===
- Gaye, Freda, ed. (1967). Who's Who in the Theatre (fourteenth ed.). London: Sir Isaac Pitman and Sons. OCLC 5997224.
- Herbert, Ian, ed. (1977). Who's Who in the Theatre (sixteenth ed.). London and Detroit: Pitman Publishing and Gale Research. ISBN 978-0-273-00163-8.
- Bader, Robert S. (2016). Four of the Three Musketeers; the Marx Brothers on Stage. Evanston, Illinois: Northwestern University Press. ISBN 978-0810134164.
- Mander, Raymond; Joe Mitchenson (1963). The Theatres of London. London: Rupert Hart-Davis. OCLC 1110747260.
- Morton, William; Henry Chance Newton (1905). Sixty Years' Stage Service: Being a Record of the Life of Charles Morton. London: Gale and Polden. OCLC 5317613.
- Pearson, Hesketh (2001) [1935]. Gilbert and Sullivan: A Biography. Cornwall: Stratus. ISBN 978-1-84232-167-6.
- Weightman, Gavin (1992). Bright Lights, Big City: London Entertained, 1830–1950. London: Collins & Brown. ISBN 978-1-85585-131-3.
- Wood, Henry J. (1946). My Life of Music. London: Gollancz. OCLC 614156984.
