= Not While I'm Around =

Song by Stephen Sondheim, performed by Helena Bonham Carter, Edward Sanders

Song by Ken Jennings, Angela Lansbury

from the album Sweeney Todd: The Demon Barber of Fleet Street (original Broadway cast recording)
- Released: 1979
- Songwriter: Stephen Sondheim

"Not While I'm Around"

Song by Helena Bonham Carter Edward Sanders
- Released: 2007
- Songwriter: Stephen Sondheim

Track listing
- Sweeney Todd: The Demon Barber of Fleet Street: The Motion Picture Soundtrack

"Not While I'm Around" is a song from the Stephen Sondheim musical Sweeney Todd: The Demon Barber of Fleet Street. It is a duet between Tobias Ragg and Mrs. Lovett that first appeared on Broadway in 1979. A screen adaptation for the 2007 film of the same name features Edward Sanders as Tobias and Helena Bonham Carter as Mrs. Lovett. In the 2023 revival, it is sung by Gaten Matarazzo and Annaleigh Ashford. Josh Groban, who played the barber in the 2023 production, has also released his own version.

== Synopsis ==
In the pie shop that Mrs. Lovett owns, Mrs. Lovett's Meat Pie Emporium, she has taken in young Tobias Ragg, who was homeless, to be her helper. When Mrs. Lovett tells Tobias to run and get a piece of toffee, she inadvertently takes out a coin purse she stole from Tobias' old master, Adolfo Pirelli, whom Sweeney Todd killed. Tobias expresses suspicions about Todd and states his desire to protect Mrs. Lovett, whom he has come to view as a mother figure. However, Mrs. Lovett tells him not to be afraid.

== Critical reception ==
Scott Foundas of Variety described this song as "tender and haunting", noting that street urchin Tobias "becomes, for a moment, her surrogate son". Reviewing the 2007 film, Peter Travers of Rolling Stone wrote "[Helena] Bonham Carter evokes chills in 'Not While I'm Around,' a ballad of devotion she croons to her young apprentice, Toby, just before she arranges his demise". The scoresheet website JW Pepper wrote "This unforgettable ballad from Sweeney Todd will create a moment of tenderness in your concert". The New York Times wrote (of a regional stage production): "The contrast of lush ballads and menacing circumstances...occurs with 'Pretty Women,' sung by Sweeney and Judge Turpin, and 'Not While I’m Around,' sung protectively to Mrs. Lovett by her young aide, Tobias Ragg".

== Covers ==
Barbra Streisand recorded a version of the song for her album The Broadway Album in 1985.

The very first line of the song was briefly covered in the 1995 The Nanny episode from season 2 titled "The Will", in which Fran Fine (Fran Drescher) mistakenly believes her boss Maxwell Sheffield (Charles Shaughnessy) could suffer a fatal heart attack if he doesn't follow a strict diet prescribed by a cardiologist (which is actually intended for one of Sheffield's clients). Maggie Sheffield (Nicholle Tom) tells Fran she's feeling upset due to acne problems in her face and asks her to cover it with makeup. In an anxiety attack, Fran hugs her while singing "Nothing's gonna harm you, not while I'm around!" trying to comfort her, believing Maggie's feeling upset about losing her father.
