= Tobias Ragg =

Fictional character

- Sweeney Todd character
- Portrayed by: Brian Glenny (1928 film, as Tobias Wragg); Johnny Singer (1936 film); Len Jones (1970 television); Ken Jennings (original 1979 Broadway cast); Michael Staniforth (original 1980 London cast); Andrew Schofield (1985 London revival); Adrian Lewis Morgan (1993 National Theatre Revival/1994 BBC Radio production); Michael Cantwell (2000 London concert); Neil Patrick Harris (2001 concert); Mark Price (2002 Kennedy Center); Manoel Felciano (2005 revival); Ben Walker (2007 TV film); Edward Sanders (2007 film); James McConville (2012 London Revival); Gaten Matarazzo (2023 Broadway revival); Joe Locke (2023 Broadway revival, starting Jan 2024)

In-universe information
- Full name: Tobias Ragg
- Alias: Tobias Wragg
- Gender: Male
- Occupation: Apprentice; Waiter
- Home: Fleet Street, London

Tobias Ragg (also spelled as Tobias Wragg and sometimes referred to as Toby) is a fictional character who appears in various adaptations of the story Sweeney Todd. The character is an apprentice to the abusive barber Pirelli until Pirelli is murdered by Todd. Tobias proceeds to stay with Todd and Mrs. Lovett, helping the latter out in her meat pie shop. Later, Tobias discovers that they have a joint venture to cook the men Todd shaves into meat pies. He ultimately kills Todd after Todd kills Lovett and Lucy Barker, along with multiple others.

Various actors have portrayed Toby, most notably Ken Jennings, the original actor in the 1979 Broadway production, Neil Patrick Harris in the 2001 concert version of the musical, Manoel Felciano in the 2005 revival of the musical, Edward Sanders in the 2007 film of the musical, and Gaten Matarazzo and Joe Locke in the 2023–2024 revival of the musical. Toby participates in multiple songs in the play and movie, having a solo in "Not While I'm Around".

== Fictional biography ==
In the penny dreadful The String of Pearls, Tobias Ragg is the apprentice of Sweeney Todd, a barber who murders his customers. Sweeney Todd has him committed to a lunatic asylum after Tobias finds proof of Todd's guilt and decides to contact the police. He eventually escapes, is involved in Todd's arrest, and as the story ends goes into the service of Johanna's husband-to-be Mark Ingestrie. Tobias Ragg was also the young apprentice of Todd in the 1936 film version of Sweeney Todd: The Demon Barber of Fleet Street.

In the Stephen Sondheim musical Sweeney Todd: The Demon Barber of Fleet Street, Toby is the apprentice of Signor Adolfo Pirelli, a barber who was once an apprentice of Todd, and a tenor/boy soprano. Pirelli pretends to be Italian, and sells fake hair tonic "concocted of "piss and ink". Toby is taken in by Mrs. Lovett after Todd kills Pirelli, who threatened to blackmail him. Toby becomes deeply attached to Mrs. Lovett, thinking of her as a surrogate mother. The character expresses this in one of the final songs in the play, "Not While I'm Around". However, when he discovers that Todd has been killing customers for Mrs. Lovett to bake into meat pies, he goes insane with horror and shock. After seeing Todd kill Mrs. Lovett, a vengeful Toby emerges from the sewers, where he was hiding, and slashes Todd's throat with his razor. Sweeney, knowing that Toby is about to kill him, lifts his head to make it easier. In Sweeney Todd: The Demon Barber of Fleet Street, a 2007 film adaptation of the musical directed by Tim Burton, Toby's role is mostly the same.

In the stage musical, Toby was originally played by Ken Jennings. In the 2007 movie, he is portrayed by Ed Sanders.

== Performers ==
- Brian Glenny played Tobias in the 1928 film. In the film, the character's last name is spelled "Wragg".
- John Singer played Tobias in the 1936 film version of Sweeney Todd.
- Len Jones played Tobias in the 1970 television adaptation of the George Dibdin Pitt play on Mystery and Imagination.
- Ken Jennings originated the role of Tobias in the original Broadway performance of Sondheim's musical in 1979.
- Michael Staniforth played Tobias in the 1980 London Production.
- Neil Patrick Harris played Tobias in the 2001 concert version of the musical.
- Manoel Felciano played Tobias in the 2005 revival of the musical.
- Edmund Bagnell played Tobias in the 2005 Revival tour.
- Ben Walker played Tobias in the 2007 non-musical TV film starring Ray Winstone.
- Edward Sanders played Tobias in the 2007 film of the musical.
- James McConville played Tobias in the 2012 London revival.
- Kyle Brenn played Tobias in the 2014 New York Philharmonic concert.
- Joseph Taylor originated the role of Tobias in the 2017 Off-Broadway revival, followed by John-Michael Lyles and Zachary Noah Piser.
- Gaten Matarazzo reprised the role of Tobias in the current (2023) Broadway revival.
- Joe Locke took over from Matarazzo on Broadway on January 31, 2024.

== Songs ==
In the musical Tobias Ragg has only one solo number, "Not While I'm Around", which he sings to Mrs. Lovett. He does sing various other songs with other characters, including:

- "The Ballad of Sweeney Todd (Prologue)" (with Company) (Note: Cut from 2007 film)
- "Pirelli's Miracle Elixir" (with Todd, Mrs. Lovett and Company) (Note: Edited for 2007 film)
- "Tooth-Pulling Sequence" (with Pirelli)
- "God, That's Good" (with Mrs. Lovett, Todd and Company)
- "Parlour Songs" - "(Tower of Bray)" (with Beadle Bamfort and Mrs. Lovett)
- "Not While I'm Around" (With Mrs. Lovett)
- "Final Scene" (with Todd and Mrs. Lovett)
- "The Ballad of Sweeney Todd (Epilogue)" (with Company)

== Awards and nominations ==
The following awards and nominations were for Edward Sanders' performance in the 2007 film.

- Broadcast Film Critics Association Awards - Critics Choice Award for Best Young Actor 2007) (nominated)
- Las Vegas Film Critics Society Awards 2007 - Sierra Award for Youth in Film - Male(won)
- Phoenix Film Critics Society Awards 2007- PFCS Award for Best Performance by a Youth in a Lead or Supporting Role - Male(won)
- Young Artist Award 2008 - Best Performance of a Supporting Young Actor in a feature film - Comedy or Musical (2008) (nominated)
