= Sweeney Todd: The Demon Barber of Fleet Street =

1979 musical by Stephen Sondheim and Hugh Wheeler

Sweeney Todd
- The Demon Barber of Fleet Street
- Artwork from the original Broadway production
- Music: Stephen Sondheim
- Lyrics: Stephen Sondheim
- Book: Hugh Wheeler
- Basis: Sweeney Todd by Christopher Bond
- Premiere: March 1, 1979: Uris Theatre, New York City
- Productions: 1979 Broadway; 1980 US tour; 1980 West End; 1989 Broadway revival; 2004 West End revival; 2005 Broadway revival; 2009 UK & Ireland tour; 2012 West End revival; 2023 Broadway revival
- Awards: Tony Award for Best Musical; Tony Award for Best Book; Tony Award for Best Score; Olivier Award Best New Musical; 1994 Laurence Olivier Award for Best Musical Revival; 2012 Laurence Olivier Award for Best Musical Revival

Sweeney Todd: The Demon Barber of Fleet Street (often referred to simply as Sweeney Todd) is a 1979 musical with music and lyrics by Stephen Sondheim and book by Hugh Wheeler. It is based on the 1970 play Sweeney Todd by Christopher Bond. The character of Sweeney Todd first appeared in a Victorian penny dreadful titled The String of Pearls.

Sweeney Todd opened on Broadway in 1979 and in the West End in 1980. It won the Tony Award for Best Musical and Olivier Award for Best New Musical. It has been revived many times and inspired a film adaptation. A panel of five American critics assembled by New York magazine in 2011 described the work as being among the three "greatest" musicals.

== Background ==
The character Sweeney Todd originated in serialized Victorian popular fiction, known as penny dreadfuls. A story called The String of Pearls was published in a weekly magazine during the winter of 1846–47. Set in 1785, the story featured as its principal villain a certain Sweeney Todd and included all the plot elements used in later versions. The murderous barber's story was turned into a play before the ending had even been revealed in print. An expanded edition appeared in 1850, an American version in 1852, a new play in 1865. By the 1870s, Sweeney Todd was a familiar character to most Victorians.

The musical was based on Christopher Bond's 1970 play Sweeney Todd, which introduced a psychological backstory and motivation to Todd's crimes. In Bond's reincarnation of the character, Todd was the victim of a ruthless judge, who exiled him to Australia and raped his young wife, driving her mad. Stephen Sondheim first conceived of a musical version of the story in 1973, after he saw Bond's take on the story at Theatre Royal Stratford East.

Bond's sophisticated plot and language significantly elevated the lurid nature of the tale. Sondheim once observed, "It had a weight to it ... because [Bond] wrote certain characters in blank verse. He also infused into it plot elements from Jacobean tragedy and The Count of Monte Cristo. He was able to take all these disparate elements that had been in existence rather dully for a hundred and some-odd years and make them into a first-rate play."

Sondheim felt that the addition of music would greatly increase the size of the drama, transforming it into a different theatrical experience, saying later:

What I did to Chris' play is more than enhance it. I had a feeling it would be a new animal. The effect it had at Stratford East in London and the effect it had at the Uris Theater in New York are two entirely different effects, even though it's the same play. It was essentially charming over there because they don't take Sweeney Todd seriously. Our production was larger in scope. Hal Prince gave it an epic sense, a sense that this was a man of some size instead of just a nut case. The music helps to give it that dimension.

Music proved to be a key element behind the impact of Sweeney Todd on audiences. Over eighty percent of the production is set to music, either sung or underscoring dialogue. The score is one vast structure, each individual part meshing with others for the good of the entire musical machine. Never before or later in his work did Sondheim utilize music in such an exhaustive capacity to further the purposes of the drama.

Sondheim decided to pair one of the most nightmarish songs (Sweeney Todd's "Epiphany") with the comic-relief of "A Little Priest". This pair of songs at the end of Act I was the most significant musical addition which Sondheim made to Bond's version of the story. In the play, Sweeney Todd's mental collapse and the subsequent plan for Lovett's meat pies take place in less than half a page of dialogue, much too quickly to convey the full psychological impact, in the view of scholar Larry A. Brown. Sondheim's version more carefully reveals the developing ideas in Todd and Mrs. Lovett's demented minds. Sondheim often said that his Sweeney Todd was about obsession – and close friends seemed to instinctually agree. When Sondheim first played songs from an early version of the show for Judy Prince (wife of the show's director), she told him: "Oh God – I didn't know this was what [Sweeney Todd] was about. It's nothing to do with Grand Guignol. It's the story of your [own] life."

When Sondheim first brought the idea for the show to director Harold Prince, his frequent collaborator, Prince was uninterested, feeling it was a simple melodrama that was not very experimental structurally. However, Prince soon discovered a metaphor in which to set the show, making what Sondheim had originally envisioned as "a small horror piece" into a colossal portrait of the Industrial Revolution, and an examination of the general human condition of the time as it related to men like Todd. Said Sondheim, "Hal's metaphor is that the factory turns out Sweeney Todds. It turns out soulless, defeated, hopeless people. That's what the play's about to him; Sweeney Todd is a product of that age. I think it's not. Sweeney Todd is a man bent on personal revenge, the way we all are in one way or another, and it has nothing whatsoever to do with the time he lived in, as far as I'm concerned." However, Sondheim accepted Prince's vision as a different way to do the show, and as an opportunity to do the show on a large scale, knowing that small-scale productions could be done at any time.

On the stage of the Uris Theater in New York, this tale of horrors was transformed into a mountain of steel in motion. Prince's scenic metaphor for Sweeney Todd was a 19th-century iron foundry moved from Rhode Island and reassembled on the stage, which critic Jack Kroll aptly described as "part cathedral, part factory, part prison, that dwarfed and degraded the swarming denizens of the lower orders". The original logo for the musical is a modified version of an advertising image from the 19th century,

When it came to casting, Sondheim thought stage veteran Angela Lansbury would add some needed comedy to the grim tale as the lunatic Cockney shopkeeper, but Lansbury needed to be convinced. She was a star and, as she pointed out to Sondheim, "Your show is not called Nellie Lovett, it's called Sweeney Todd. And I'm the second banana." To convince her, Sondheim "auditioned", writing a couple of songs for her, including the macabre patter song, "A Little Priest". And he gave her the key to the character, saying, "I want Mrs. Lovett to have a music hall character." Lansbury, who had grown up in British music halls, immediately got it. "Not just music hall ... but dotty music hall", as she put it. After she was formally confirmed in the role, she relished the opportunity, saying that she loved "the extraordinary wit and intelligence of [Sondheim's] lyrics."

Canadian actor and singer Len Cariou was Sondheim's personal choice to play the tortured barber. In preparation for the role, Cariou (who was studying with a voice teacher at the time) asked Sondheim what kind of range he needed to have in the role. Cariou told him he was prepared to give Sondheim a couple of octaves to deal with, and Sondheim immediately replied, "That would be more than sufficient."

With Prince absorbed in staging the mammoth production, Lansbury and Cariou were left largely to their own when it came to developing their characters. They worked together on all their scenes, both of them creative actors who were experienced in giving intense performances. "That cuckoo style of playing Mrs. Lovett, that was pretty much Angela ... She invented that character", Cariou said. She recalled, "I just ran with it. The wide-openness of my portrayal had to do with my sink or swim attitude toward it. I just figured hell, I've done everything else on Broadway, I might as well go with Mrs. Lovett."

It is said that on opening night Harold Clurman, the doyen of American theatre critics, rushed up to Schuyler Chapin, former general manager of the Metropolitan Opera, demanding to know why he had not put it on at the Met. To which Chapin replied: "I would have put it on like a shot if I'd had the opportunity. There would have been screams and yells but I wouldn't have given a damn. Because it is an opera. A modern American opera."

== Synopsis ==
The citizens of London, who act as a Greek chorus throughout the play, drop a body bag and pour ashes into a shallow grave. Sweeney Todd rises forth ("The Ballad of Sweeney Todd"), and introduces the drama.

=== Act I ===
In 1846, young sailor Anthony Hope and the mysterious Sweeney Todd, whom Anthony has recently rescued at sea and befriended, dock in London. A beggar woman sexually solicits them, appearing to recognize Todd for a moment ("No Place Like London"), and Todd shoos her away. Todd obliquely relates some of his troubled past to Anthony: he was a naïve barber, and a corrupt judge who lusted after Todd's beautiful wife removed him as an obstacle ("The Barber and His Wife"). Leaving Anthony, Todd enters a meat pie shop on Fleet Street, where the owner, the slatternly widow Mrs. Lovett, laments the scarcity of meat and customers ("Worst Pies in London"). When Todd asks after the empty upstairs apartment, she reveals that its former tenant, Benjamin Barker, was transported for life based on false charges by Judge Turpin, who, along with his servant, Beadle Bamford, then lured Barker's wife Lucy to a masked ball at the Judge's home and raped her ("Poor Thing").

Todd's reaction reveals that he is himself Benjamin Barker. Promising to keep his secret, Mrs. Lovett explains that Lucy poisoned herself with arsenic and that their then-infant daughter, Johanna, became the Judge's ward. Todd swears revenge on the Judge and the Beadle, and Mrs. Lovett presents Todd with his old collection of sterling silver straight razors, which persuades Todd to take up his old profession ("My Friends" and "The Ballad of Sweeney Todd" – reprise). Elsewhere, Anthony spies a beautiful girl singing at her window ("Green Finch and Linnet Bird"), and the beggar woman tells him that her name is Johanna. Unaware that Johanna is his friend Todd's daughter, Anthony is immediately enamored ("Ah, Miss"), and he pledges to return for her, even after the judge and the Beadle threaten him and chase him away ("Johanna").

In the crowded London marketplace, flamboyant Italian barber Adolfo Pirelli and his simple-minded young assistant Tobias Ragg pitch a dramatic cure-all for hair loss ("Pirelli's Miracle Elixir"). Todd and Lovett soon arrive; as part of his plan to establish his new identity, Todd exposes the elixir as a sham, challenges Pirelli to a shaving competition and easily wins ("The Contest"), inviting the impressed Beadle for a free shave ("The Ballad of Sweeney Todd" – reprise 2). Several days later, Judge Turpin flagellates himself in a frenzy over a growing lust for Johanna, but instead resolves to marry her himself ("Johanna – Mea Culpa").

Todd awaits the Beadle's arrival with mounting impatience, but Mrs. Lovett tries to soothe him ("Wait"). When Anthony tells Todd of his plan to ask Johanna to elope with him, Todd, eager to reunite with his daughter, agrees to let them use his barbershop as a safehouse. As Anthony leaves, Pirelli and Tobias enter, and Mrs. Lovett takes Tobias downstairs for a pie. Alone with Todd, Pirelli drops his Italian accent and reveals that he is really Daniel O'Higgins, Benjamin Barker's former assistant. He knows Todd's true identity (having recognized Barker's illustrious shaving tools during their earlier competition) and demands half his income for life. Todd kills O'Higgins by slitting his throat ("The Ballad of Sweeney Todd" – reprise 3) and temporarily hides his body. Meanwhile, Johanna and Anthony plan their elopement ("Kiss Me"), while the Beadle recommends Todd's grooming services to the Judge so that the judge may better win Johanna's affections ("Ladies in Their Sensitivities").

Panicked at first on learning of Pirelli's murder, Mrs. Lovett swipes his leftover coin purse and then asks Todd how he plans to dispose of the body. Suddenly, the judge enters; Todd quickly seats him and lulls him with a relaxing conversation ("Pretty Women"). Before Todd can kill the judge, however, Anthony re-enters and blurts out his elopement plan. The angry judge storms out, vowing never to return and to send Johanna away. Todd drives Anthony out in a fit of fury and, reminded of the evil he sees in London, resolves to depopulate the city by murdering his future customers since all people deserve to die: the wicked to be punished for their deeds, and the "rest of us" to be relieved of their misery ("Epiphany"). While discussing how to dispose of Pirelli's body, Mrs. Lovett is struck by a sudden idea and suggests that they use the bodies of Todd's victims in her meat pies, and Todd happily agrees ("A Little Priest").

=== Act II ===
Several weeks later, Mrs. Lovett's pie shop has become a successful business, and Tobias works there as a waiter. The pies are very popular ("God, That's Good!"). Todd has acquired a special mechanical barber's chair that allows him to kill clients and then send their bodies directly through a chute into the pie shop's basement bakehouse. Casually slitting his customers' necks, Todd despairs of ever seeing Johanna, while Anthony searches London for her ("Johanna"). Anthony finds Johanna locked away in a private lunatic asylum, but barely escapes being placed under arrest by the Beadle. After a day of hard work, while Todd remains fixated on his revenge, Mrs. Lovett envisions eloping with Todd and retiring to the seaside ("By the Sea"). Anthony arrives to beg Todd for help to free Johanna, and Todd, revitalised, instructs Anthony to rescue her by posing as a wigmaker intent on purchasing inmates' hair ("Wigmaker Sequence" and "The Ballad..." – reprise 4). However, once Anthony has departed, Todd sends a letter informing the Judge that Anthony will bring Johanna to his shop just after dark, and that he will hand her over ("The Letter") in order to lure him back to the shop.

In the pie shop, Tobias tells Mrs. Lovett of his skepticism about Todd and his own desire to protect her ("Not While I'm Around"). When he recognizes Pirelli's coin purse in Mrs. Lovett's hands, she distracts him by showing him the bakehouse, instructing him how to work the meat grinder and the oven before locking him in. Upstairs, she encounters the Beadle at her harmonium; he has been asked by Lovett's neighbors to investigate the strange smoke and stench from the pie shop's chimney. Mrs. Lovett stalls the Beadle with "Parlor Songs" until Todd returns to offer the Beadle his promised "free shave"; Mrs. Lovett loudly plays her harmonium to cover the Beadle's screams above as Todd dispatches him. In the basement, Tobias discovers hair and fingernails in a pie he has been eating, just as the Beadle's fresh corpse comes tumbling through the chute. Terrified, he flees into the sewers below the bakehouse. Mrs. Lovett then informs Todd that Tobias has found out about their secret and they plot to kill him.

Anthony arrives at the asylum to rescue Johanna, but is exposed when Johanna recognizes him. Anthony draws a pistol given to him by Todd, but cannot bring himself to shoot Jonas Fogg, the corrupt asylum owner; Johanna grabs the pistol and kills Fogg. As Anthony and Johanna flee, the asylum's freed inmates prophesy the end of the world, while Todd and Mrs. Lovett hunt through the sewers for Tobias, and the beggar woman fears what has become of the Beadle ("City on Fire/Searching").

Anthony and Johanna (now disguised as a sailor) arrive at Todd's empty shop. Anthony leaves to seek a coach after he and Johanna reaffirm their love ("Ah Miss" – reprise). Johanna hears the beggar woman entering and hides in a trunk in the barbershop. The beggar woman seems to recognize the room ("Beggar Woman's Lullaby"). Todd enters and tries to force her to leave as she again seems to recognize him. Hearing the Judge outside, a frantic Todd kills the beggar woman, sending her body down the chute barely a moment before the Judge bursts in. Todd assures the Judge that Johanna is repentant, and the judge asks for a quick splash of cologne.

Once he has the Judge in his chair, Todd soothes him with another conversation on women, but this time he alludes to their "fellow tastes in women". The Judge recognizes him as Benjamin Barker just before Todd slashes his throat and sends him hurtling down the chute ("The Judge's Return"). Remembering Tobias, Todd starts to leave, but, realizing he has left his razor behind, returns just as the disguised Johanna rises, horrified, from the trunk. Not recognizing her, Todd attempts to kill her, just as Mrs. Lovett shrieks from the bakehouse below, providing a distraction for Johanna to escape. Downstairs, Mrs. Lovett is struggling with the dying Judge, who clutches at her dress. She then attempts to drag the beggar woman's body into the oven, but Todd arrives and, through a shaft of light, sees the lifeless face clearly for the first time: the beggar woman was his wife Lucy. Horrified, Todd accuses Mrs. Lovett of lying to him. Mrs. Lovett frantically denies it, explaining that Lucy did indeed poison herself, but lived, although the attempt left her insane. Mrs. Lovett then tells Todd she loves him and would be a better wife than Lucy ever could have been. Todd feigns forgiveness, dancing manically with Mrs. Lovett until he hurls her into the oven, burning her alive. Todd, in shock and despair, embraces the dead Lucy. Tobias, now insane and his hair turned white, crawls up from the sewer babbling nursery rhymes to himself. He picks up Todd's fallen razor and slits Todd's throat. As Todd falls dead and Tobias drops the razor, Anthony, Johanna and some constables break into the bakehouse. Tobias, heedless of them, begins turning the meat grinder, crooning Mrs. Lovett's previous instructions to him ("Final Scene").

=== Epilogue ===
The ensemble cast, soon joined by the risen Todd and Mrs. Lovett, sing a final reprise of "The Ballad of Sweeney Todd" warning against revenge (though admitting that "everyone does it"). Tearing off their costumes, the company exits. Todd sneers and vanishes.

== Musical numbers ==
Prologue

- "Prelude: The Ballad of Sweeney Todd: 'Attend the Tale of Sweeney Todd...'" – Full Cast*

Act I

- "No Place Like London" – Anthony, Todd, Beggar Woman
- "The Barber and His Wife" – Todd
- "The Worst Pies in London" – Mrs. Lovett
- "Poor Thing" – Mrs. Lovett
- "My Friends" – Todd and Mrs. Lovett
- "The Ballad of Sweeney Todd: '...Lift Your Razor High, Sweeney!'" (reprise 1) – Company, Judge, Beadle*
- "Green Finch and Linnet Bird" – Johanna
- "Ah, Miss" – Anthony, Johanna, Beggar Woman
- "Johanna" – Anthony
- "Pirelli's Miracle Elixir" – Tobias, Todd, Mrs. Lovett, Crowd
- "The Contest (Part 1): Shaving Scene" – Pirelli
- "The Contest (Part 2): Tooth-Pulling Scene" ^{†&} – Pirelli, Tobias
- "The Ballad of Sweeney Todd: '...Sweeney Pondered and Sweeney Planned...'" (reprise 2) – Company, Beggar Woman*
- "Wait" – Lovett
- "The Ballad of Sweeney Todd: '...His Hands Were Quick, His Fingers Strong...'" (reprise 3) – Tenor Trio*
- "Johanna (Mea Culpa)" ^{†‡&} – Judge Turpin
- "Kiss Me (Part 1)" – Johanna, Anthony
- "Ladies in Their Sensitivities" – Beadle
- "Kiss Me (Part 2)" – Beadle, Johanna, Anthony, Judge Turpin
- "Pretty Women" – Judge, Todd, Anthony
- "Epiphany" – Todd, Lovett
- "A Little Priest" – Todd, Lovett

Act II

- "God, That's Good!" – Tobias, Mrs. Lovett, Todd, Customers
- "Johanna (Act 2 Sequence)" – Anthony, Todd, Beggar Woman, Johanna
- "By the Sea" – Mrs. Lovett and Todd
- "Wigmaker Sequence"/"The Ballad of Sweeney Todd: '...Sweeney'd Waited Too Long Before...' (reprise 4)"/"The Letter" – Todd, Anthony, Quintet*
- "Not While I'm Around" – Tobias, Mrs. Lovett
- "Parlor Sequence":
  - "Parlor Song (Part 1): Sweet Polly Plunkett" – Beadle
  - "Parlor Song (Part 2): The 12 Bells in Tower of Bray" – Beadle, Lovett, Tobias ^{†}
  - "Parlor Song (Part 3): Sweet Polly Plunkett" (reprise) – Lovett
- "Final Sequence":
  - "The Ballad of Sweeney Todd: '...The Engine Roared, The Motor Hissed...'" (reprise 5) – Chorus*
  - "Fogg's Asylum" / "Fogg's Passacaglia" – Anthony, Mr. Fogg, Johanna, Lunatics
  - "City on Fire!" – Lunatics, Anthony, Johanna, Beggar Woman, Lovett, Todd
  - "Searching" / "Ah, Miss" (reprise) – Anthony, Johanna
  - "Beggar Woman's Lullaby" ^{§} – Beggar Woman, Todd
  - "The Judge's Return" – Judge Turpin, Todd
  - "The Ballad of Sweeney Todd: '...Lift Your Razor High, Sweeney...'" (reprise 6) – Chorus*
  - "Final Scene" – Lovett, Todd
  - "The Barber and His Wife" (reprise) – Todd, Tobias

Epilogue

- "The Ballad of Sweeney Todd: '...Attend the Tale of Sweeney Todd...'" (reprise 7) – Company, Todd, Lovett (Full Cast)

Notes on the songs:

- * "The Ballad of Sweeney Todd" and its multiple reprises are titled in some productions by their first lyrics to differentiate them from one another.
- † Despite being cut in previews ("Mea Culpa") and on the tour ("Tooth Pulling Scene") for reasons of length, these numbers were included on the Original Cast Recording. They have been restored in subsequent productions.
- ‡ This song was moved to after "The Ballad of Sweeney Todd" (reprise 3) in the 2000 and 2014 New York Philharmonic concert performances, and on the Original Broadway Cast Album.
- § This number was written for the original London production and first recorded for the 2000 New York Philharmonic concert performance.
- & These songs were cut from the 2023 Broadway revival.
- Sources: SondheimGuide.com & InternetBroadwayDatabase

== Casts ==
=== Original casts ===
| Character | Broadway | West End | US National Tour | Broadway Revival | Broadway Revival | West End Revival | Broadway Revival |
| Character | 1979 | 1980 | | 1989 | 2005 | 2012 | 2023 |
|---|---|---|---|---|---|---|---|
| Sweeney Todd | Len Cariou | Denis Quilley | George Hearn | Bob Gunton | Michael Cerveris | Michael Ball | Josh Groban |
| Mrs. Lovett | Angela Lansbury | Sheila Hancock | Angela Lansbury | Beth Fowler | Patti LuPone | Imelda Staunton | Annaleigh Ashford |
| Anthony Hope | Victor Garber | Andrew C. Wadsworth | Cris Groenendaal | Jim Walton | Benjamin Magnuson | Luke Brady | Jordan Fisher |
| Johanna Barker | Sarah Rice | Mandy More | Betsy Joslyn | Gretchen Kingsley | Lauren Molina | Lucy May Barker | Maria Bilbao |
| Tobias Ragg | Ken Jennings | Michael Staniforth | Ken Jennings | Eddie Korbich | Manoel Felciano | James McConville | Gaten Matarazzo |
| Judge Turpin | Edmund Lyndeck | Austin Kent | Edmund Lyndeck | David Barron | Mark Jacoby | John Bowe | Jamie Jackson |
| Beadle Bamford | Jack Eric Williams | David Wheldon-Williams | Calvin Remsberg | Michael McCarty | Alexander Gemignani | Peter Polycarpou | John Rapson |
| The Beggar Woman | Merle Louise | Dilys Watling | Angelina Réaux | SuEllen Estey | Diana DiMarzio | Gillian Kirkpatrick | Ruthie Ann Miles |
| Adolfo Pirelli | Joaquin Romaguera | John Aron | Sal Mistretta | Bill Nabel | Donna Lynne Champlin | Robert Burt | Nicholas Christopher |

==== Notable replacements ====
Broadway (1979–80)

- Sweeney Todd: George Hearn
- Mrs. Lovett: Dorothy Loudon
- Anthony Hope: Cris Groenendaal
- Johanna Barker: Betsy Joslyn

Broadway (2005–06)

- Mrs. Lovett: Judy Kaye

West End (2012)

- Adolfo Pirelli: Jason Manford

Broadway (2023–2024)

- Sweeney Todd: Nicholas Christopher, Aaron Tveit
- Mrs. Lovett: Jeanna de Waal, Sutton Foster
- Tobias Ragg: Joe Locke

== Productions ==
=== Original Broadway production ===
The original production premiered on Broadway at the Uris Theatre on March 1, 1979, and closed on June 29, 1980, after 557 performances and 19 previews. Directed by Hal Prince and choreographed by Larry Fuller, the scenic design was by Eugene Lee, costumes by Franne Lee and lighting by Ken Billington. The cast included Angela Lansbury as Mrs. Lovett, Len Cariou as Todd, Victor Garber as Anthony, Sarah Rice as Johanna, Merle Louise as the Beggar Woman, Ken Jennings as Tobias, Edmund Lyndeck as Judge Turpin, Joaquin Romaguera as Pirelli, and Jack Eric Williams as Beadle Bamford. The production was nominated for nine Tony Awards, winning eight including Best Musical. Dorothy Loudon and George Hearn replaced Lansbury and Cariou on March 4, 1980. Other replacements include Cris Groenendaal as Anthony and Betsy Joslyn as Johanna. The cast recording was released in 1979.

==== Early tours and filming ====
The first national U.S. tour started on October 24, 1980, in Washington, D.C. and ended in August 1981 in Los Angeles, California. Lansbury was joined by Hearn and this version was taped during the Los Angeles engagement and broadcast on The Entertainment Channel (one of the predecessors of today's A&E) on September 12, 1982. This performance would later be repeated on Showtime and PBS (the latter as part of its Great Performances series); It was later released on home video through Turner Home Entertainment, and on DVD from Warner Home Video. The taped production was nominated for five Primetime Emmy Awards in 1985, winning three including Outstanding Individual Performance in a Variety or Music Program (for George Hearn).

A North American tour started on February 23, 1982, in Wilmington, Delaware, and ended on July 17, 1982, in Toronto, Ontario. June Havoc and Ross Petty starred.

=== Original West End production ===
The first London production opened on July 2, 1980, at the West End's Theatre Royal, Drury Lane, starring Denis Quilley and Sheila Hancock along with Andrew C. Wadsworth as Anthony, Mandy More as Johanna, Michael Staniforth as Tobias, Austin Kent as Judge Turpin, Dilys Watling as the Beggar Woman, David Wheldon-Williams as Beadle Bamford, Oz Clarke as Jonas Fogg, and John Aron as Pirelli. The show ran for 157 performances. Despite receiving mixed reviews, the production won the Olivier Award for Best New Musical in 1980. The production closed on November 14, 1980.

=== 1989 Broadway ===
The first Broadway revival opened on September 14, 1989, at the Circle in the Square Theatre, and closed on February 25, 1990, after 189 performances and 46 previews. It was produced by Theodore Mann, directed by Susan H. Schulman, with choreography by Michael Lichtefeld. The cast featured Bob Gunton (Sweeney Todd), Beth Fowler (Mrs. Lovett), Eddie Korbich (Tobias Ragg), Jim Walton (Anthony Hope) and David Barron (Judge Turpin). In contrast to the original Broadway version, the production was designed on a relatively intimate scale and was affectionately referred to as "Teeny Todd." It was originally produced Off-Broadway by the York Theatre Company at the Church of the Heavenly Rest from March 31, 1989, to April 29, 1989. This production received four Tony Award nominations: for Best Revival of a Musical, Best Actor in a Musical, Best Actress in a Musical and Best Direction of a Musical, but failed to win any.

=== 1993 London ===
In 1993, the show received its first London revival at the Royal National Theatre. The production opened at the Cottesloe Theatre on June 2, 1993, and later transferred to the Lyttleton Theatre on December 16, 1993, playing in repertory and closing on June 1, 1994. The show's design was slightly altered to fit a proscenium arch theatre space for the Lyttleton Theatre. The director was Declan Donnellan and the Cottesloe Theatre production starred Alun Armstrong as Todd and Julia McKenzie as Mrs. Lovett, with Adrian Lester as Anthony, Barry James as Beadle Bamford and Denis Quilley (who had originated the title role in the original London production in 1980) as Judge Turpin. When the show transferred to the Lyttleton, Quilley and Christopher Benjamin took over the roles of Todd and Turpin respectively. The production won Olivier Awards for Best Musical Revival, Best Actor (Armstrong) and Actress in a Musical (McKenzie), and Best Director of a Musical for Donnellan. Adrian Lester and Barry James received nominations in the category of Best Supporting Performance in a Musical as Anthony and Beadle Bamford respectively.

=== 2004 London and 2005 Broadway ===
In 2004, John Doyle directed the musical at the Watermill Theatre in Newbury, England, running from July 27 until October 9, 2004. This production transferred to the West End's Trafalgar Studios and then the Ambassadors Theatre. The 10-person cast played the score themselves on musical instruments that they carried onstage. It starred Paul Hegarty as Todd, Karen Mann as Mrs. Lovett, Rebecca Jackson as The Beggar Woman, Sam Kenyon as Tobias, Rebecca Jenkins as Johanna, David Ricardo-Pearce as Anthony and Colin Wakefield as Judge Turpin. This production closed February 5, 2005. In early 2006, the production toured the UK with Jason Donovan as Todd and Harriet Thorpe as Mrs. Lovett.

A version of the same production transferred to Broadway, opening on November 3, 2005, at the Eugene O'Neill Theatre with a new cast, all of whom played their own instruments, as had been done in London. The cast consisted of Patti LuPone (Mrs. Lovett/Tuba/Percussion), Michael Cerveris (Todd/Guitar), Manoel Felciano (Tobias/Violin/Clarinet/Piano), Alexander Gemignani (Beadle/Piano/Trumpet), Lauren Molina (Johanna/Cello), Benjamin Magnuson (Anthony/Cello/Piano), Mark Jacoby (Turpin/Trumpet/Percussion), Donna Lynne Champlin (Pirelli/Accordion/Flute/Piano), Diana DiMarzio (Beggar Woman/Clarinet) and John Arbo (Fogg/Double bass). After 35 previews, the production ran for 349 performances and was nominated for six Tony Awards, winning two (Best Direction of a Musical for Doyle and Best Orchestrations for Sarah Travis). Because of the small scale of the musical, it cost $3.5 million to make, a sum small in comparison to many Broadway musicals, and recouped the investment in nineteen weeks. A national tour based on the production began on August 30, 2007, with Judy Kaye (who had temporarily replaced LuPone in the Broadway run) as Mrs. Lovett and David Hess as Todd. Gemignani played the title role for the Toronto run of the tour in November 2007.

=== 2012 West End ===
Michael Ball and Imelda Staunton starred in a new production of the show that played at The Chichester Festival Theatre, running from September 24 to November 5, 2011. Directed by Jonathan Kent, the cast included Ball as Todd, Staunton as Mrs. Lovett, James McConville as Tobias, John Bowe as Judge Turpin, Robert Burt as Pirelli, Luke Brady as Anthony, Gillian Kirkpatrick as Lucy Barker, Lucy May Barker as Johanna and Peter Polycarpou as Beadle Bamford. It was notably set in the 1930s instead of 1846 and restored the oft-cut song "Johanna (Mea Culpa)". The production received positive reviews and transferred to the Adelphi Theatre in the West End in 2012 for a limited run from March 10 to September 22, 2012. Comedian Jason Manford made his musical debut as Pirelli from July 2 to 28 and August 15, 18 and 24, 2012 while Robert Burt appeared at Glyndebourne Festival Opera. The West End transfer received six Laurence Olivier Award nominations of which it won the three: Best Musical Revival, Best Actor in a Musical for Ball and Best Actress in a Musical for Staunton.

=== 2023 Broadway ===
The production began with a workshop three days after Sondheim's death in November 2021; he had planned to attend the workshop's final day. The production had a budget of $14 million. The Broadway previews began on February 26, and it opened on March 26, 2023, at the Lunt-Fontanne Theatre, starring Josh Groban as Sweeney Todd, Annaleigh Ashford as Mrs. Lovett, Jordan Fisher as Anthony, Gaten Matarazzo as Tobias, Maria Bilbao as Johanna, Jamie Jackson reprising the role of Judge Turpin, Ruthie Ann Miles as the Beggar Woman, John Rapson reprising the role of Beadle Bamford, and Nicholas Christopher as Pirelli. The production was directed by Thomas Kail, with restored original orchestrations by Jonathan Tunick, musical supervision by Alex Lacamoire and choreography by Steven Hoggett. Designers included Mimi Lien (sets), Emilio Sosa (costumes) and Natasha Katz (lighting). Matarazzo departed on November 5. Groban and Ashford were replaced by Aaron Tveit and Sutton Foster for a 12-week limited run starting February 9 until the closing. Joe Locke took over the role of Tobias on January 31, 2024. The production closed on May 5, 2024.

Jesse Green, in The New York Times, called the production "ravishingly sung, deeply emotional and strangely hilarious", praising the cast, especially Groban and Ashford; direction; designs; and orchestra.

=== Other productions ===
==== 1987–1997 ====
The State Opera of South Australia presented Australia's first professional production in Adelaide in September 1987. Directed by Gale Edwards, it featured Lyndon Terracini as Todd, Nancye Hayes as Mrs. Lovett and Peter Cousens as Anthony. The following month, Melbourne Theatre Company's version opened at the Playhouse in Melbourne, directed by Roger Hodgman with Peter Carroll as Sweeney Todd, Geraldine Turner as Mrs. Lovett and Jon Ewing as Judge Turpin. The Melbourne production toured to Sydney and Brisbane in 1988.

The musical opened in June 1992, at the Erkel Theater in Budapest, Hungary. The play was translated into Hungarian by Tibor Miklós and György Dénes. The cast starred Lajos Miller as Sweeney Todd and Zsuzsa Lehoczky as Mrs. Lovett. In 1994, East West Players in Los Angeles staged the show directed by Tim Dang, featuring a largely Asian Pacific American cast. It was also the first time the show had been presented in an intimate house (Equity 99-seat). Josh Groban, the first 2023 Todd, saw that production. The production received 5 Ovation Awards including the Franklin Levy Award for Best Musical (Smaller Theatre) and Best Director (Musical) for Dang.

On April 5, 1995, it premiered in Catalan at the theater Poliorama of Barcelona (later moving to the Apollo), in a production of the Drama Centre of the Government of Catalonia. The libretto was adapted by Roser Batalla Roger Pena, and was directed by Mario Gas. The cast consisted of Constantino Romero as Sweeney Todd, Vicky Peña as Mrs. Lovett, Maria Josep Peris as Johanna, Muntsa Rius as Tobias, Pep Molina as Anthony, Xavier Ribera-Vall as Judge Turpin & Teresa Vallicrosa as The Beggar Woman. It later moved to Madrid. The show received over fifteen awards. The 1997 Finnish National Opera production premiered on September 19, 1997. Directed by Staffan Aspegren and starting Sauli Tiilikainen (Sweeney Todd) and Ritva Auvinen (Mrs. Lovett). Translated by Juice Leskinen

==== 2002–2010 ====
As part of the Kennedy Center Sondheim Celebration, Sweeney Todd ran in May and June 2002 at the Eisenhower Theatre, starring Brian Stokes Mitchell as Sweeney Todd and Christine Baranski as Mrs. Lovett, with Hugh Panaro as Anthony, Walter Charles (an original cast member), as Judge Turpin, Celia Keenan-Bolger as Johanna and Mary Beth Peil as The Beggar Woman. It was directed by Christopher Ashley with choreography by Daniel Pelzig.

David Shannon starred as Todd in production of the show at the Gate Theatre in Dublin, Ireland, which ran from April through June 2007. The production employed a minimalistic approach: the cast consisted of a small ensemble of 14 performers, and the orchestra was a seven-piece band. The look of the production was abstract. The Sunday Times wrote that "The black backdrop of David Farley's rough hewn set and the stark minimalism of Rick Fisher's lighting suggest a self-conscious edginess, with Shannon's stylised make-up, long leather coat and brooding countenance only adding to the feeling." When a character died, flour was poured over them.

The 2008 Gothenburg production played in May and June at The Göteborg Opera. The show was a collaboration with West End International Ltd. The cast featured Michael McCarthy as Sweeney Todd and Rosemary Ashe as Mrs Lovett and David Shannon this time as Anthony. An equity tour of the UK and Ireland began in 2009. To disassociate itself from West End backlash at the time regarding stunt casting, the tour was cast through an open call audition process. It ran for 8 months, starring Barry Howell as Todd and Isabell Wyer as Mrs. Lovett.

In 2010, fifty members of the National Youth Music Theatre staged a production at the Village Underground as part of Stephen Sondheim's 80th birthday celebrations in London. Directed by Martin Constantine, NYMT staged the show in a converted Victorian warehouse in the city's East End. The company revived the show in 2011 for the International Youth Arts Festival at the Rose Theatre in Kingston upon Thames.

==== 2011–2015 ====
A production opened in April 2011 at the Théâtre du Châtelet (Paris), which had produced the first Sondheim show in France (A Little Night Music). The director was Lee Blakeley with choreography by Lorena Randi and designs by Tanya McAllin. The cast featured Rod Gilfry and Franco Pomponi (Sweeney Todd) and Caroline O'Connor (Mrs Lovett).

The Lyric Stage Company of Boston produced a run in September and October 2014 with the company's Artistic Director Spiro Veloudos directing the show. The cast starred Christopher Chew as Sweeney Todd and Amelia Broome as Mrs. Lovett. Quebec City-based Théâtre Décibel produced the first French-language production of the show. Translated by Joëlle Bond and directed by Louis Morin, the show played from October 28 to November 8, 2014, at the Capitole de Québec. The cast included Renaud Paradis as Todd and Katee Julien as Mrs. Lovett.

Washington D.C.'s Landless Theatre Company orchestrates a prog metal version of Sweeney Todd. The production played at DC's Warehouse Theatre in August 2014, directed by Melissa Baughman with music direction by Charles W. Johnson and prog metal orchestration by The Fleet Street Collective (Andrew Lloyd Baughman, Spencer Blevins, Charles Johnson, Lance LaRue, Ray Shaw, Alex Vallejo, Andrew Siddle). The cast featured metal band front singers Nina Osegueda (A Sound of Thunder) as Mrs. Lovett, Andrew Lloyd Baughman (Diamond Dead) as Sweeney Todd, Rob Bradley (Aries and Thrillkiller) as Pirelli, and Irene Jericho (Cassandra Syndrome) as Beggar Woman. The show received three 2015 Helen Hayes Awards nominations for Best Musical, Outstanding Director of a Musical (Melissa Baughman), and Outstanding Music Director (Charles W. Johnson). The adaptation was revived by Landless Theatre in 2023 with Osegueda, Baughman, and Bradley reprising their roles.

Welsh National Opera performed the musical as part of their 2015 "Madness" season. Directed by James Brining and designed by Colin Richmond, the production was set in the 1970/1980s and was performed at the Wales Millennium Centre, Cardiff, before touring to England and returning to Cardiff. It was based on Brining's previous productions in 2010 and 2013. The cast included David Arnsperger as Todd, Janis Kelly as Mrs. Lovett, and Jamie Muscato as Anthony.

Pieter Toerien and KickstArt produced the show at the Pieter Toerien Monte Casino Theatre in Johannesburg from October to December 2015, before transferring to the Theatre on the Bay in Cape Town from February to April 2016. Directed by Steven Stead and designed by Greg King, the production starred Jonathan Roxmouth (Sweeney Todd) and Charon Williams-Ros (Mrs Lovett).

==== 2015–2017 ====
In 2015, Victorian Opera's production was performed at the Melbourne Arts Centre. The production was revived for New Zealand Opera in 2016, visiting Auckland, Wellington and Christchurch. The production starred Teddy Tahu Rhodes as Sweeney Todd and Antoinette Halloran as Mrs. Lovett, with Kanen Breen as Beadle Bamford.

The Tooting Arts Club presented a site-specific production at Harrington's Pie Shop in Tooting, London in October and November 2014. Sondheim attended and enjoyed the production and told producer Cameron Mackintosh who later produced a West End transfer at a pie shop recreated in Shaftesbury Avenue and ran from March 19 to May 16, 2015. The cast included Jeremy Secomb as Sweeney Todd, Siobhán McCarthy as Mrs. Lovett, Nadim Naaman as Anthony, Ian Mowat as the Beadle, Duncan Smith as the Judge, Kiara Jay as Pirelli and the Beggar Woman, Joseph Taylor as Tobias and Zoe Doano as Johanna.

The Tooting Arts Club production transferred Off-Broadway, transforming the Barrow Street Theatre into a re-creation of Harrington's pie shop. Previews began February 14, 2017, before an opening on March 1. It was also directed by Bill Buckhurst, designed by Simon Kenny and produced by Rachel Edwards, Jenny Gersten, Seaview Productions and Nate Koch in association with Barrow Street Theatre. The cast featured four members of the London cast: Secomb as Todd, McCarthy as Mrs. Lovett, Duncan Smith as the Judge and Taylor as Tobias, alongside Brad Oscar as the Beadle, Betsy Morgan as Pirelli and the Beggar Woman, Matt Doyle as Anthony and Alex Finke as Johanna. From April, replacements included Norm Lewis as Todd, Carolee Carmello as Mrs. Lovett and Jamie Jackson as Turpin. Later replacements included Hugh Panaro as Todd, Sally Ann Triplett as Johanna and Matt Leisy as Beadle Bamford. The production closed on August 26, 2018.

==== 2018–present ====
Valtru produced the first Mexican production of Sweeney Todd. Opened on July 7, 2018, at the Foro Cultural Coyoacanense's starring Lupita Sandoval and Beto Torres. In June 2019, a limited run of the production was presented by Life Like Company at Her Majesty's Theatre, Melbourne and Darling Harbour Theatre, ICC Sydney. It starred Anthony Warlow as Todd, Gina Riley as Mrs. Lovett, Debra Byrne as the Beggar Woman and Michael Falzon as Pirelli. Produced by Atlantis Theatrical Entertainment Group and directed by Bobby Garcia with musical direction by Gerard Salonga, Sweeney starred Jett Pangan as Todd, Lea Salonga as Mrs. Lovett, with Gerald Santos as Anthony and Nyoy Volante as Pirelli. The production debuted in October 2019 at The Theater at Solaire Resort & Casino in the Philippines.

Jason Alexander directed a staging from January to February 2026 at La Mirada Theatre near Los Angeles, California. Will Swenson and Lesli Margherita starred as Todd and Lovett. A revival at the Birmingham Repertory Theatre, UK opened on 4 July running until 15 August 2026, directed by Joe Murphy, starring Ramin Karimloo as Todd, Meow Meow as Mrs. Lovett and David Bedella as Judge Turpin.

=== Opera house productions ===
The first opera company to mount Sweeney Todd was the Houston Grand Opera in a production directed by Hal Prince, which ran from June 14, 1984, through June 24, 1984, for a total of 10 performances. Conducted by John DeMain, the production used scenic designs by Eugene Lee, costume designs by Franne Lee, and lighting designs by Ken Billington. The cast included Timothy Nolen in the title role, Joyce Castle as Mrs. Lovett, Cris Groenendaal as Anthony, Lee Merrill as Johanna, Will Roy as Judge Turpin, and Barry Busse as The Beadle.

In 1984 the show was presented by the New York City Opera. Hal Prince recreated the staging using the simplified set of the 2nd national tour. It was well received and most performances sold out. It was brought back for limited runs in 1986 and 2004. Notably the 2004 production starred Mark Delavan and Elaine Paige. The show was also performed by Opera North in 1998 in the UK starring Steven Page and Beverley Klein, directed by David McVicar and conducted by James Holmes.

In the early 2000s, Sweeney Todd gained acceptance with opera companies throughout the United States, Canada, Austria, Japan, Germany, Israel, Spain, the Netherlands, the United Kingdom and Australia. Bryn Terfel, the popular Welsh bass-baritone, performed the title role at Lyric Opera of Chicago in 2002, with Judith Christian, David Cangelosi, Timothy Nolen, Bonaventura Bottone, Celena Shaffer and Nathan Gunn. It was performed at the Royal Opera House in London as part of the Royal Opera season (December 2003 – January 2004) starring Sir Thomas Allen as Todd, Felicity Palmer as Mrs. Lovett and a supporting cast that included Rosalind Plowright, Robert Tear and Jonathan Veira as Judge Turpin. The Finnish National Opera performed Sweeney Todd in 1997–98. The Israeli National Opera has performed Sweeney Todd twice. The Icelandic Opera performed the piece in the fall of 2004, the first time in Iceland. On September 12, 2015, Sweeney Todd opened at the San Francisco Opera with Brian Mulligan as Todd, Stephanie Blythe as Mrs. Lovett, Matthew Grills as Tobias, Heidi Stober as Johanna, Elliot Madore as Anthony and Elizabeth Futral as the Beggar Woman/Lucy. In 2019, Sweeney Todd opened at the Copenhagen Opera House.

=== Concert productions ===
A "Reprise!" Concert version was performed at Los Angeles' Ahmanson Theatre on March 12–14, 1999 with Kelsey Grammer as Todd, Christine Baranski as Mrs. Lovett, Davis Gaines as Anthony, Neil Patrick Harris as Tobias, Melissa Manchester as The Beggar Woman, Roland Rusinek as The Beadle, Dale Kristien as Johanna and Ken Howard as Judge Turpin.

London's Royal Festival Hall hosted two performances on February 13, 2000, starring Len Cariou as Todd, Judy Kaye as Mrs. Lovett, and Davis Gaines as Anthony. A 4-day concert took place in July 2007 at the same venue with Bryn Terfel, Maria Friedman, Daniel Boys and Philip Quast.

Director Lonny Price directed a semi-staged concert production of "Sweeney Todd in Concert" on May 4–6, 2000 at Avery Fisher Hall at Lincoln Center, New York with the New York Philharmonic. The cast included George Hearn (a last-minute substitute for Bryn Terfel) in the title role, alongside Patti LuPone (Mrs. Lovett), Neil Patrick Harris (Tobias), Davis Gaines (Anthony), John Aler, Paul Plishka, Heidi Grant Murphy (Johanna), Stanford Olsen (Pirelli) and Audra McDonald (Beggar-Woman/Lucy). This concert also played in San Francisco, from July 19–21, 2001, with the San Francisco Symphony. Hearn and LuPone were joined once again by Harris, Gaines, Aler and Olsen as well as new additions Victoria Clark, Lisa Vroman and Timothy Nolen. This production was taped for PBS and broadcast in 2001, and won the Primetime Emmy Award for Outstanding Classical Music-Dance Program. The same production played at the Ravinia Festival in Chicago on August 24, 2001, with most of the cast from the preceding concerts, except for Plishka and Clark, who were replaced by Sherrill Milnes and Hollis Resnik.

In 2014, Price directed a new concert production, returning to Avery Fisher Hall with the New York Philharmonic on March 5–8 with Bryn Terfel as Todd, Emma Thompson as Mrs. Lovett, Philip Quast as Judge Turpin, Jeff Blumenkrantz as The Beadle, Christian Borle as Pirelli, Kyle Brenn as Tobias, Jay Armstrong Johnson as Anthony, Erin Mackey as Johanna and Audra McDonald and Bryonha Marie Parham sharing the role of The Beggar Woman. Parham played the role at the Saturday performances, while McDonald played it at the other performances. The concert was filmed for broadcast on PBS as part of their Live from Lincoln Center series and was first aired on September 26, 2014; it was nominated for three Primetime Emmy Awards, winning one for Outstanding Special Class Program. This production transferred to the London Coliseum with the English National Opera for 13 performances from March 30 through April 12, 2015. The cast included Terfel, Thompson and Quast reprising their roles from the New York concert alongside John Owen-Jones as Pirelli, Matthew Seadon-Young as Anthony, Katie Hall as Johanna, Jack North as Tobias, Alex Gaumond as The Beadle and Rosalie Craig as the Beggar Woman.

== Film adaptation ==
A feature film adaptation of Sweeney Todd, directed by Tim Burton with a screenplay by John Logan, was released on December 21, 2007. It stars Johnny Depp as Todd (Depp received an Oscar nomination and a Golden Globe Award for his performance), Helena Bonham Carter as Mrs. Lovett, Alan Rickman as Judge Turpin, Sacha Baron Cohen as Signor Pirelli, Jamie Campbell Bower as Anthony Hope, Laura Michelle Kelly as The Beggar Woman, Jayne Wisener as Johanna, Ed Sanders as Tobias, and Timothy Spall as Beadle Bamford. The film was well received by critics and theatregoers and also won the Golden Globe Award for Best Motion Picture – Musical or Comedy.

== Themes and legacy ==
Stephen Sondheim believed that Sweeney Todd is a story of revenge and how it consumes a vengeful person. He asserted, "what the show is really about is obsession". Unlike most previous representations of the story, the musical avoids a simplistic view of devilish crimes. Instead, the characters' "emotional and psychological depths" are examined, so that Sweeney Todd is understood as a victim as well as a perpetrator in the "great black pit" of humanity.

A panel of five American critics assembled by New York magazine in 2011 described Sweeney Todd as being among the three "greatest" American musicals, alongside Guys and Dolls and Gypsy.

== Musical analysis ==
Sondheim's score is one of his most complex, with orchestrations by his long-time collaborator Jonathan Tunick. Relying heavily on counterpoint and angular harmonies, its compositional style has been compared to Maurice Ravel, Sergei Prokofiev, and Bernard Herrmann. Sondheim also utilizes the plainchant setting of the "Dies irae" in the ballad that runs throughout the score, later heard in a melodic inversion, and in the accompaniment to "Epiphany". According to Raymond Knapp, "Most scene changes bring back 'The Ballad of Sweeney Todd', which includes both fast and slow versions of the 'Dies Irae'". He also relies heavily on leitmotif – at least twenty distinct ones can be identified throughout the score.

Depending on how and where the show is presented, it is sometimes considered an opera. Sondheim himself has described the piece as a "black operetta", and indeed, only about 20% of the show is spoken; the rest is sung-through.

In his essay for the 2005 cast album, Jeremy Sams finds it most relevant to compare Sondheim's work with operas that similarly explore the psyche of a mad murderer or social outcast, such as Alban Berg's Wozzeck (1925, based on the play by Georg Büchner) and Benjamin Britten's Peter Grimes (1945). On the other hand, it can be seen as a precursor to the later trend of musicals based on horror themes, such as Little Shop of Horrors (1982), The Phantom of the Opera (1986), Jekyll & Hyde (1997) and Dance of the Vampires (1997), which used the description of the trend, "grusical", as its commercial label. Theatre critic and author Martin Gottfried wrote on this subject: "Does so much singing make it an opera? Opera is not just a matter of everything being sung. There is an operatic kind of music, of singing, of staging. There are opera audiences, and there is an opera sensibility. There are opera houses. Sweeney Todd has its occasional operatic moments, but its music overall has the chest notes, the harmonic language, the muscularity, and the edge of Broadway theater."

Donal Henahan wrote an essay in The New York Times concerning the 1984 New York City Opera production: "The difficulty with Sweeney was not that the opera singers were weaklings incapable of filling the State Theater with sound – Miss Elias, who was making her City Opera debut, has sung for many years at the Metropolitan, a far larger house. The other voices in the cast also were known quantities. Rather, it seemed to me that the attempt to actually sing the Sondheim score, which relies heavily on a dramatic parlando or speaking style, mainly showed how far from the operatic vocal tradition the work lies. The score, effective enough in its own way, demanded things of the opera singers that opera singers as a class are reluctant to produce."

== Awards and nominations ==
=== Original Broadway production ===
| Year | Award ceremony | Category | Nominee | Result |
|---|---|---|---|---|
| 1979 | Tony Award | Best Musical | | Won |
| 1979 | Tony Award | Best Book of a Musical | Hugh Wheeler | Won |
| 1979 | Tony Award | Best Original Score | Stephen Sondheim | Won |
| 1979 | Tony Award | Best Actor in a Musical | Len Cariou | Won |
| 1979 | Tony Award | Best Actress in a Musical | Angela Lansbury | Won |
| 1979 | Tony Award | Best Direction of a Musical | Harold Prince | Won |
| 1979 | Tony Award | Best Scenic Design | Eugene Lee | Won |
| 1979 | Tony Award | Best Costume Design | Franne Lee | Won |
| 1979 | Tony Award | Best Lighting Design | Ken Billington | Nominated |
| 1979 | Drama Desk Award | Outstanding Musical | | Won |
| 1979 | Drama Desk Award | Outstanding Book of a Musical | Hugh Wheeler | Won |
| 1979 | Drama Desk Award | Outstanding Lyrics | Stephen Sondheim | Won |
| 1979 | Drama Desk Award | Outstanding Music | Stephen Sondheim | Won |
| 1979 | Drama Desk Award | Outstanding Actor in a Musical | Len Cariou | Won |
| 1979 | Drama Desk Award | Outstanding Actress in a Musical | Angela Lansbury | Won |
| 1979 | Drama Desk Award | Outstanding Featured Actor in a Musical | Ken Jennings | Won |
| 1979 | Drama Desk Award | Outstanding Featured Actress in a Musical | Merle Louise | Won |
| 1979 | Drama Desk Award | Outstanding Choreography | Larry Fuller | Nominated |
| 1979 | Drama Desk Award | Outstanding Director of a Musical | Harold Prince | Won |
| 1979 | Drama Desk Award | Outstanding Set Design | Eugene Lee | Nominated |
| 1979 | Drama Desk Award | Outstanding Costume Design | Franne Lee | Nominated |
| 1979 | Drama Desk Award | Outstanding Lighting Design | Ken Billington | Nominated |

=== Original London production ===
| Year | Award ceremony | Category | Nominee | Result |
|---|---|---|---|---|
| 1980 | Laurence Olivier Award | Best New Musical | | Won |
| 1980 | Laurence Olivier Award | Best Actor in a Musical | Denis Quilley | Won |
| 1980 | Laurence Olivier Award | Best Actress in a Musical | Sheila Hancock | Nominated |

=== 1989 Broadway revival ===
| Year | Award ceremony | Category | Nominee | Result |
|---|---|---|---|---|
| 1990 | Tony Award | Best Revival of a Musical | | Nominated |
| 1990 | Tony Award | Best Actor in a Musical | Bob Gunton | Nominated |
| 1990 | Tony Award | Best Actress in a Musical | Beth Fowler | Nominated |
| 1990 | Tony Award | Best Direction of a Musical | Susan H. Schulman | Nominated |
| 1990 | Drama Desk Award | Outstanding Revival of a Musical | | Nominated |
| 1990 | Drama Desk Award | Outstanding Actor in a Musical | Bob Gunton | Nominated |
| 1990 | Drama Desk Award | Outstanding Actress in a Musical | Beth Fowler | Nominated |
| 1990 | Drama Desk Award | Outstanding Set Design | James Morgan | Nominated |
| 1990 | Drama Desk Award | Outstanding Lighting Design | Mary Jo Dondlinger | Won |

=== 1993 London revival ===
| Year | Award ceremony | Category | Nominee | Result |
|---|---|---|---|---|
| 1994 | Laurence Olivier Award | Best Musical Revival | | Won |
| 1994 | Laurence Olivier Award | Best Actor in a Musical | Alun Armstrong | Won |
| 1994 | Laurence Olivier Award | Best Actress in a Musical | Julia McKenzie | Won |
| 1994 | Laurence Olivier Award | Best Performance in a Supporting Role in a Musical | Adrian Lester | Nominated |
| 1994 | Laurence Olivier Award | Best Performance in a Supporting Role in a Musical | Barry James | Nominated |
| 1994 | Laurence Olivier Award | Best Director of a Musical | Declan Donnellan | Won |

=== 2005 London revival ===
| Year | Award ceremony | Category | Nominee | Result |
|---|---|---|---|---|
| 2005 | Laurence Olivier Award | Outstanding Musical Production | | Nominated |
| 2005 | Laurence Olivier Award | Best Actor in a Musical | Paul Hegarty | Nominated |

=== 2005 Broadway revival ===
| Year | Award ceremony | Category | Nominee | Result |
|---|---|---|---|---|
| 2006 | Tony Award | Best Revival of a Musical | | Nominated |
| 2006 | Tony Award | Best Direction of a Musical | John Doyle | Won |
| 2006 | Tony Award | Best Actor in a Musical | Michael Cerveris | Nominated |
| 2006 | Tony Award | Best Actress in a Musical | Patti LuPone | Nominated |
| 2006 | Tony Award | Best Featured Actor in a Musical | Manoel Felciano | Nominated |
| 2006 | Tony Award | Best Orchestrations | Sarah Travis | Won |
| 2006 | Drama Desk Award | Outstanding Revival of a Musical | | Won |
| 2006 | Drama Desk Award | Outstanding Actor in a Musical | Michael Cerveris | Nominated |
| 2006 | Drama Desk Award | Outstanding Actress in a Musical | Patti LuPone | Nominated |
| 2006 | Drama Desk Award | Outstanding Featured Actor in a Musical | Alexander Gemignani | Nominated |
| 2006 | Drama Desk Award | Outstanding Orchestrations | Sarah Travis | Won |
| 2006 | Drama Desk Award | Outstanding Director of a Musical | John Doyle | Won |
| 2006 | Drama Desk Award | Outstanding Set Design | John Doyle | Nominated |
| 2006 | Drama Desk Award | Outstanding Lighting Design | Richard G. Jones | Won |
| 2006 | Drama Desk Award | Outstanding Sound Design | Dan Moses Schreier | Nominated |

=== 2012 London revival ===
| Year | Award ceremony | Category | Nominee | Result |
|---|---|---|---|---|
| 2012 | Evening Standard Award | Best Musical | | Won |
| 2013 | Laurence Olivier Award | Best Musical Revival | | Won |
| 2013 | Laurence Olivier Award | Best Actor in a Musical | Michael Ball | Won |
| 2013 | Laurence Olivier Award | Best Actress in a Musical | Imelda Staunton | Won |
| 2013 | Laurence Olivier Award | Best Costume Design | Anthony Ward | Nominated |
| 2013 | Laurence Olivier Award | Best Lighting Design | Mark Henderson | Nominated |
| 2013 | Laurence Olivier Award | Best Sound Design | Paul Groothuis | Nominated |

=== 2023 Broadway revival ===
| Year | Award | Category | Nominee | Result |
|---|---|---|---|---|
| 2023 | Tony Awards | Best Revival of a Musical | | Nominated |
| 2023 | Tony Awards | Best Actor in a Musical | Josh Groban | Nominated |
| 2023 | Tony Awards | Best Actress in a Musical | Annaleigh Ashford | Nominated |
| 2023 | Tony Awards | Best Featured Actress in a Musical | Ruthie Ann Miles | Nominated |
| 2023 | Tony Awards | Best Scenic Design of a Musical | Mimi Lien | Nominated |
| 2023 | Tony Awards | Best Lighting Design of a Musical | Natasha Katz | Won |
| 2023 | Tony Awards | Best Sound Design of a Musical | Nevin Steinberg | Won |
| 2023 | Tony Awards | Best Choreography | Steven Hoggett | Nominated |
| 2023 | Drama Desk Award | Outstanding Revival of a Musical | | Nominated |
| 2023 | Drama Desk Award | Outstanding Direction of a Musical | Thomas Kail | Won |
| 2023 | Drama Desk Award | Outstanding Lead Performance in a Musical | Annaleigh Ashford | Won |
| 2023 | Drama Desk Award | Outstanding Lighting Design of a Musical | Natasha Katz | Won |
| 2023 | Drama League Award | Distinguished Performance | Annaleigh Ashford | Won |
| 2023 | Drama League Award | Distinguished Performance | Josh Groban | Nominated |
| 2023 | Drama League Award | Outstanding Revival of a Musical | | Nominated |
| 2023 | Drama League Award | Outstanding Direction of a Musical | Thomas Kail | Nominated |
| 2023 | Outer Critics Circle Award | Outstanding Revival of a Musical | | Nominated |
| 2023 | Outer Critics Circle Award | Outstanding Scenic Design | Mimi Lien | Nominated |
| 2023 | Outer Critics Circle Award | Outstanding Lighting Design | Natasha Katz | Nominated |
| 2023 | Grammy Award | Best Musical Theater Album | | Nominated |

== Recordings and broadcasts ==
An original Broadway cast recording was released by RCA Red Seal in 1979. It included the Judge's "Johanna" and the tooth-pulling contest from Act I, which had been cut in previews. It was selected by the National Recording Registry for preservation in 2013.

A performance of the 1980 touring company was taped before an audience in 1981 at the Dorothy Chandler Pavilion in Los Angeles during the first national tour, with additional taping done in an empty theatre for a television special. The resulting program was televised on September 12, 1982, on The Entertainment Channel. It was later released on both VHS and DVD.

On 2 July 1994, the Royal National Theatre revival production starring Denis Quilley and Julia McKenzie was broadcast by the BBC. Opera North's production was also broadcast by the BBC on March 30, 1998, as was the Royal Opera House production in 2003.

In 1995, the Barcelona cast recorded a cast album sung in Catalan. This production was also broadcast on Spanish television.

The 2000 New York City Concert was recorded and released in a deluxe 2-CD set. This recording was nominated for the Grammy Award for Best Musical Show Album.

In 2001, the same concert was held in San Francisco with the same leads and minor cast changes. It was also videotaped and broadcast on PBS, and then was released to VHS and DVD in 2001.

The 2005 Broadway revival also was recorded. The producers originally planned only a single-disk "highlights" version; however, they soon realized that they had recorded more music than could fit on one disk and it was not financially feasible to bring the performers back in to re-record. The following songs were cut: "Wigmaker Sequence", "The Letter", "Parlor Songs", "City on Fire", and half of the final sequence (which includes "The Judge's Return"). This recording was nominated for the Grammy Award for Best Musical Show Album.

The 2012 London revival was recorded and released on April 2, 2012, in the UK and April 10, 2012, in the United States.

The 2023 Broadway revival cast recording was released on September 8, 2023. This followed the release of eight song tracks from the recording from May 8, 2023 until September 7, the day before the album's release. The album's full track list, slightly modified from the original cast recording, was released on August 21. The only songs missing from the recording are "The Ballad of Sweeney Todd" (reprises 2-5), "Wigmaker Sequence," (save for "The Letter"), "Parlor Songs (Parts 2 and 3)", and "Fogg's Asylum". This recording was nominated for the Grammy Award for Best Musical Show Album.
