= Sweeney Todd: The Demon Barber of Fleet Street (original Broadway cast recording) =

Sweeney Todd – The Demon Barber of Fleet Street – Original Cast

Cast recording by the original cast
- Released: April 17, 1979
- Recorded: 1979
- Studios: RCA's Studio A, New York
- Label: RCA

An original Broadway cast recording of the 1979 musical Sweeney Todd: The Demon Barber of Fleet Street was made in the same year by RCA. Released on LP on April 17, 1979, it peaked at number 78 on Billboard's Top LPs chart and won the Grammy in the "Best Cast Show Album" category.

== Background ==
Produced by Thomas Z. Shepard, the album was recorded in 1979 at RCA's Studio A in New York City.

== Critical reception ==
Professional ratings
Review scores
| Source | Rating |
|---|---|
| AllMusic | 5/5 stars |

In his retrospective review on AllMusic, William Ruhlmann especially notes it is a two-disc release that contains the "complete score" of the musical and praises the show as "a masterpiece full of stirring music and witty, intricate lyrics, lustily delivered by a cast led by Angela Lansbury and Len Cariou".

In 2014, the album was added to the National Recording Registry as "represent[ing] an important part of America's culture and history".

== Chart performance ==
The album reached number 78 on the Billboard's Top LPs chart. According to the magazine, it was "RCA's best selling Broadway album since Hair a decade [prior]."

== Track listing ==
LP – RCA Red Seal CBL2-3379

Side 1
| No. | Title | Artist(s) | Length |
|---|---|---|---|
| 1. | "[Prologue]" "Prelude"; "The Ballad of Sweeney Todd: „Attend the tale of Sweeney Todd“" | Len Cariou, Company |
| 2. | "[Act I]" "No Place like London"; "The Barber and His Wife" | Victor Garber, Len Cariou, Merle Louise; Len Cariou |
| 3. | "The Worst Pies in London" | Angela Lansbury |
| 4. | "Poor Thing" | Angela Lansbury |
| 5. | "My Friends"; "The Ballad of Sweeney Todd: „Lift your razor high, Sweeney!“" | Len Cariou, Angela Lansbury; Members of the Company |
| 6. | "Green Finch and Linnet Bird"; "Ah, Miss"; "Johanna" | Sarah Rice; Victor Garber, Sarah Rice, Merle Louise; Victor Garber |

Side 2
| No. | Title | Artist(s) | Length |
|---|---|---|---|
| 1. | "Pirelli's Miracle Elixir"; "The Contest" | Ken Jennings, Len Cariou, Angela Lansbury, Joaquín Romaguera; Joaquín Romaguera |
| 2. | "The Ballad of Sweeney Todd: „Sweeney pondered and Sweeney planned“"; "Wait" | Members of the Company; Angela Lansbury |
| 3. | "The Ballad of Sweeney Todd: „His hands were quick, his fingers strong“"; "Johanna" | Cris Groenendaal, Frank Kopyc, Richard Warren Pugh; Edmund Lyndeck |
| 4. | "Kiss Me"; "Ladies in Their Sensitivities" | Sarah Rice, Victor Garber; Jack Eric Williams, Edmund Lyndeck |

Side 3
| No. | Title | Artist(s) | Length |
|---|---|---|---|
| 1. | "Pretty Women"; "Epiphany" | Edmund Lyndeck, Len Cariou, Victor Garber; Len Cariou, Angela Lansbury |
| 2. | "A Little Priest" | Angela Lansbury, Len Cariou |
| 3. | "[Act II]" "God, That's Good!" | Ken Jennings, Angela Lansbury, Len Cariou, Company |
| 4. | "Johanna" | Victor Garber, Len Cariou, Merle Louise, Sarah Rice |

Side 4
| No. | Title | Artist(s) | Length |
|---|---|---|---|
| 1. | "By the Sea" | Angela Lansbury, Len Cariou |
| 2. | "Wigmaker Sequence"; "The Ballad of Sweeney Todd: „Sweeney'd waited too long before“"; "The Letter" | Len Cariou, Victor Garber; Carole Doscher, Skip Harris, Betsy Joslyn, Craig Lucas, Robert Ousley; Len Cariou, Carole Doscher, Skip Harris, Betsy Joslyn, Craig Lucas, Robert Ousley |
| 3. | "Not While I'm Around" | Ken Jennings, Angela Lansbury |
| 4. | "Parlor Songs" | Jack Eric Williams, Angela Lansbury, Ken Jennings |
| 5. | "Final Sequence" | Company |
| 6. | "[Epilogue]" "The Ballad of Sweeney Todd: „Attend the tale of Sweeney Todd“" | Company |

== Personnel ==
- Thomas Z. Shepard – producer
- Jay David Saks – associate producer

== Charts ==
| Chart (1979) | Peak position |
|---|---|
| US Billboard Top LPs | 78 |

== Awards ==
| Year | Award type | Categories | Results | Ref. |
|---|---|---|---|---|
| 1980 | Grammy Awards | Best Cast Show Album | Won | |
