= Judge Turpin =

Main antagonist in the various adaptations of Sweeney Todd

- Alan Rickman as Judge Turpin
- Portrayed by: Edmund Lyndeck (Original 1979 Broadway production); Ken Howard (1999 Los Angeles production); Paul Plishka (2000 New York production); Timothy Nolen (2001 San Francisco production); Walter Charles (2002 Eisenhower production); Colin Wakefield (2004 England revival); Mark Jacoby (2005 Broadway revival); Alan Rickman (2007 film); Matthew Tipper (2013 MGS Production); Philip Quast (2007, 2014, & 2015 Concerts); Jamie Jackson (2023 Broadway revival)

In-universe information
- Occupation: Judge
- Children: Johanna Barker (ward)

Judge Turpin (also known as Lord Turpin) is a fictional character in Christopher Bond's 1973 play of the story of Sweeney Todd, as well as later adaptations. Serving as the main antagonist, he is a cruel and corrupt judge who imprisons Benjamin Barker on false charges, rapes Barker's wife Lucy, and takes Barker's daughter Johanna in as his ward.

== Earlier versions ==
Judge Turpin did not exist in the earliest versions of Sweeney Todd. A character of that name appeared in the story The String of Pearls, but was an older potential suitor of Johanna Oakley (with her mother's approval) with no personal connection to Sweeney Todd. It was not until Christopher Bond wrote his 1973 play Sweeney Todd: The Demon Barber of Fleet Street that the character of Judge Turpin emerged as he is most often portrayed.

== Synopsis ==
In Bond's play and its subsequent adaptations by Stephen Sondheim and Tim Burton, Judge Turpin has Benjamin Barker arrested and sent to a penal colony in Australia in order to have Barker's wife, Lucy, to himself. Lucy is heartbroken by this and becomes a recluse, refusing to leave her home. Judge Turpin continuously pursues her, sending her flowers every day. He sends his henchman, Beadle Bamford, to summon her to his home, "blaming himself for her dreadful plight." where he hosts a masquerade ball. He then rapes Lucy, and she attempts to kill herself by drinking poison. She survives but goes insane, forced to live as a beggar in the streets. Turpin then adopts the Barkers' infant daughter, Johanna, and raises her as his ward. He keeps her locked away from the world and spies on her through a peephole in her wall. When Johanna turns sixteen, Turpin asks for her hand in marriage. She turns him down, to his bafflement. When he catches Anthony Hope looking at Johanna, he has the beadle threaten to kill him if he ever returns by snapping a bird's neck and saying "get the gist of it friend. next time it'll be your neck".

On Bamford's advice, he goes for a shave at Sweeney Todd's barber shop in order to win over Johanna; unaware that Todd is in fact Benjamin Barker, returned from Australia and seeking revenge. Todd is about to cut Turpin's throat when he is interrupted by Anthony, who reveals Johanna's plan to escape. Turpin promptly returns home and finds that Johanna is smitten with Anthony. He sends her away to an asylum, planning to keep her there until she agrees to marry him.

Turpin receives a letter claiming that Johanna has repented, unaware that the letter is part of a trap laid by Todd. Following the letter's direction, he goes back to Todd's shop, where he is persuaded to let Todd shave him again. Turpin realizes Todd's true identity, and Todd successfully slits his throat and drops him down a chute leading to Todd's accomplice Mrs. Lovett's basement, where he bleeds to his death.

== Songs ==
In the musical, Judge Turpin is on seven songs, one of which is a solo song, "Johanna (Mea Culpa)." The tracks were all composed by Stephen Sondheim:

- "Prologue: The Ballad of Sweeney Todd" (with Company)**
- "The Ballad of Sweeney Todd (Reprise 1)" (with Company)**
- "Johanna (Mea Culpa)" (Solo)**
- "Kiss Me (Part II/Quartet)" (with Johanna, Anthony, and Beadle Bamford)**
- "Pretty Women (parts 1 and 2)" (with Sweeney Todd)
- "The Judge's Return" (with Sweeney Todd)
- "The Ballad of Sweeney Todd (Epilogue)" (with Company)**

(* Edited for 2007 film)
(** Cut from 2007 film)

== Performers ==
- Edmund Lyndeck - original 1979 Broadway production and 1980 tour of Sondheim's musical.
- Austin Kent - 1980 London production.
- Will Roy - 1984 Houston Grand Opera/New York City Opera co-production.
- Denis Quilley - 1993 London revival.
- Xavier Ribera-Vall - Mario Gas's production (1995-1997 and 2009-2012).
- Timothy Nolen - 2001 San Francisco filmed concert production.
- Mark Jacoby - 2005 Broadway revival musical.
- Alan Rickman - Tim Burton's 2007 film adaptation of Sondheim's musical.
- Philip Quast - 2007 and 2015 London concerts, 2014 Broadway concert.
- Robert Cuccioli - 2022 production at The Muny.
- Jamie Jackson - off-Broadway in 2017 and in the 2023 Broadway revival.
- David Bedella - Birmingham Repertory Theatre 2026 revival
