= Timothy Nolen =

American baritone and actor (1941–2023)

- Born: July 9, 1941; Rotan, Texas, U.S.
- Died: August 31, 2023 (aged 82)
- Occupations: Actor, singer
- Known for: The Phantom of the Opera, Sweeney Todd: The Demon Barber of Fleet Street

Timothy Nolen (July 9, 1941 – August 31, 2023) was an American actor and baritone who had an active career in operas, musicals, concerts, plays, and on television for over four decades. He was the second actor to play the title role in Andrew Lloyd Webber's The Phantom of the Opera on Broadway replacing Michael Crawford in October 1988.

Nolen notably portrayed the title role in the first operatic presentation of Stephen Sondheim's Sweeney Todd: The Demon Barber of Fleet Street at the Houston Grand Opera in 1984 and the role of Judge Turpin in a concert version of Sweeney Todd broadcast on PBS's Great Performances in 2001.

== Early life ==
Timothy Nolen was born in Rotan, Texas, and began his career appearing in small supporting roles with opera companies in the United States during the 1960s.

== Career ==
Nolen made his debut at the San Francisco Opera as the Officer in the United States premiere of Darius Milhaud's Christophe Colomb on October 5, 1968. He appeared in several supporting roles with the company through 1973, including Gregorio in Roméo et Juliette, Marullo in Rigoletto, Montano in Otello, Morales in Carmen, Ned Keene in Peter Grimes, Schaunard in La Bohème, Sciarrone in Tosca, and the Wigmaker in Ariadne auf Naxos among others. He then portrayed leading roles at the SFO like Figaro in The Barber of Seville (1976, with Frederica von Stade as Rosina), Dr. Malatesta in Don Pasquale (1980, with Geraint Evans in the title role), and Dr. Falke in Die Fledermaus (1990, with Patricia Racette as Rosalinde). Nolen starred as the lead in the 1981 premiere of Willie Stark.

Nolen portrayed the title role in the first operatic presentations of Stephen Sondheim's Sweeney Todd: The Demon Barber of Fleet Street at the Houston Grand Opera and New York City Opera in 1984.

Nolen made his Broadway debut in 1985 as Doyle in the original production of Larry Grossman's Grind; a portrayal for which he received a Drama Desk Award for Outstanding Featured Actor in a Musical nomination.

On 10 October 1988, he returned to Broadway to portray the title role in the musical The Phantom of the Opera. He was the second actor to portray the role on Broadway since he took it over from the original star Michael Crawford. He left the production in March 1989 being replaced by operatic tenor and fellow Sweeney Todd and Phantom star Cris Groenendaal.

Nolen reprised the title role in Sweeney Todd at Chicago's Marriott Theatre in 1993, receiving a Joseph Jefferson Award nomination for his portrayal. He has since played Sweeney Todd in numerous productions, including at the Goodspeed Opera House.

Nolen played the Comte de Guiche in Cyrano: The Musical (1994) on Broadway and later took over the role of Cyrano.

In 2001, Nolen performed the role of Judge Turpin in a concert version of Sweeney Todd: The Demon Barber of Fleet Street with the New York Philharmonic. The production was broadcast on PBS's Great Performances. Starring opposite him were George Hearn as Todd, Patti LuPone as Lovett, Davis Gaines as Anthony, and Neil Patrick Harris as Tobias. He reprised the role later that year in a production at the Lyric Opera of Chicago. He most recently played Turpin in 2012 at the Opera Theatre of Saint Louis.

In 2004, he returned to the title role in Sweeney Todd: The Demon Barber of Fleet Street at the New York City Opera opposite Elaine Paige as Mrs. Lovett.

His television appearances include guest star appearances in The Sopranos, Wildfire, and Guiding Light.

Nolen made his debut at the Metropolitan Opera on October 1, 1996, as Krusina in Bedřich Smetana's The Bartered Bride under the baton of James Levine. He has since returned to that house as Baron Zeta in The Merry Widow (2000–2001, with Plácido Domingo as Count Danilovich) and the One-Eyed Man in Die Frau ohne Schatten (2001–2002, with Deborah Voigt as the Empress).

== Death ==
Nolen died on August 31, 2023, at the age of 82.
