= Sweeney Todd: The Demon Barber of Fleet Street: The Motion Picture Soundtrack =

Soundtrack album by Various Artists
- Released: December 18, 2007
- Recorded: 2007
- Genre: Soundtrack
- Length: 71:26
- Label: Nonesuch
- Producer: Mike Higham

Professional ratings
Review scores
Source	Rating
AllMusic	4.5/5 stars

Sweeney Todd: The Demon Barber of Fleet Street: The Motion Picture Soundtrack is a soundtrack to the film of the same name, released on December 18, 2007.

In a change from the original, Sondheim cut the show's famous opening number, "The Ballad of Sweeney Todd", explaining, "Why have a chorus singing about 'attending the tale of Sweeney Todd' when you could just go ahead and attend it?" Sondheim acknowledged that, in adapting a musical to film, the plot has to be kept moving, and was sent MP3 files of his shortened songs by Mike Higham, the film's music producer, for approval. Several other songs were also cut, and Sondheim noted that there were "many changes, additions and deletions... [though]... if you just go along with it, I think you'll have a spectacular time." To create a larger, more cinematic feel, the score was reorchestrated by the stage musical's original orchestrator, Jonathan Tunick, who increased the orchestra from twenty-seven musicians to seventy-eight.

The Sweeney Todd: The Demon Barber of Fleet Street Deluxe Complete Edition soundtrack was released on December 18, 2007. Johnny Depp's singing was described by a New York Times reviewer as "harsh and thin, but amazingly forceful". Another critic adds that, though Depp's voice "does not have much heft or power", "his ear is obviously excellent, because his pitch is dead-on accurate... Beyond his good pitch and phrasing, the expressive colorings of his singing are crucial to the portrayal. Beneath this Sweeney's vacant, sullen exterior is a man consumed with a murderous rage that threatens to burst forth every time he slowly takes a breath and is poised to speak. Yet when he sings, his voice crackles and breaks with sadness."

== Track listing ==
All tracks are written by Stephen Sondheim.

No.	Title	Performer(s)	Length
1.	"Opening Title"		3:30
2.	"No Place Like London" (**)	Johnny Depp, Jamie Campbell Bower	5:31
3.	"The Worst Pies in London"	Helena Bonham Carter	2:23
4.	"Poor Thing" (**)	Helena Bonham Carter	3:09
5.	"My Friends"	Johnny Depp, Helena Bonham Carter	3:48
6.	"Green Finch and Linnet Bird"	Jayne Wisener	2:16
7.	"Alms! Alms!" (* ***)	Laura Michelle Kelly	1:16
8.	"Johanna"	Jamie Campbell Bower	1:57
9.	"Pirelli's Miracle Elixir"	Edward Sanders, Johnny Depp, Helena Bonham Carter	2:00
10.	"The Contest" (**)	Sacha Baron Cohen	3:39
11.	"Wait"	Helena Bonham Carter	2:38
12.	"Ladies in Their Sensitivities" (*)	Timothy Spall	1:23
13.	"Pretty Women" (**)	Johnny Depp, Alan Rickman	4:27
14.	"Epiphany"	Johnny Depp, Helena Bonham Carter	3:16
15.	"A Little Priest" (**)	Helena Bonham Carter, Johnny Depp	5:15
16.	"Johanna" (Reprise)	Jamie Campbell Bower, Johnny Depp, Laura Michelle Kelly	5:42
17.	"God, That's Good!" (***)	Edward Sanders, Helena Bonham Carter	2:46
18.	"By the Sea"	Helena Bonham Carter, Johnny Depp	2:19
19.	"Not While I'm Around" (**)	Edward Sanders, Helena Bonham Carter	4:11
20.	"Final Scene" (* ***)	Helena Bonham Carter, Johnny Depp, Laura Michelle Kelly, Alan Rickman	10:21

* Not on the "Highlights" version of the soundtrack.
** Tracks that are significantly longer than their "Highlights" counterparts.
*** Song is either written specially or adapted for the film.

=== Additional album personnel ===
- Executive soundtrack album producers: Tim Burton and Robert Hurwitz
- Executive in charge of music for Warner Bros. Pictures: Doug Frank
- Album Produced by Mike Higham
- Orchestra recorded by Jake Jackson and Geoff Foster at Air Lyndhurst Studios, London
- Conducted by Paul Gemignani
- Orchestrations by Jonathan Tunick
- Additional orchestrations by Julian Kershaw
- Additional arrangements by Mike Higham and Alex Heffes
- Vocals for Mr. Depp produced by Bruce Witkin
- Vocals recorded by Andy Richards at Out of Eden, London
- Rugby School Chapel Organ by Andy Richards
- Music editors: Sam Southwick, John Warhurst
- Mixed by Andy Richards at Out of Eden, London
- Mastered by Robert C. Ludwig at Gateway Mastering & DVD, Portland, ME
- Design by Gabriele Wilson
- Photograph of Stephen Sondheim by Jarry Jackson
- For Nonesuch Records:
  - Production supervisor: Katrina Beznicki
  - Production manager: Eli Cane
  - Editorial coordinator: Robert Edridge-Waks

== Charts ==
Chart (2008)	Peak position
Australian Albums (ARIA)	45
Austrian Albums (Ö3 Austria)	33
French Albums (SNEP)	49
German Albums (Offizielle Top 100)	40
Spanish Albums (PROMUSICAE)	49
UK Albums (OCC)	38
US Billboard 200	16
US Billboard Top Soundtracks	3

== Certifications and sales ==
Region	Certification	Certified units/sales
United Kingdom (BPI)	Silver	60,000^{*}
United States	—	375,363
^{*} Sales figures based on certification alone.
