= I Spy a Spy =

American musical theatre production

- Music: Sohee Youn
- Lyrics: Jamie Jackson
- Book: Youn & Jackson
- Premiere: July 6, 2019: St Clements Theatre
- Productions: Off Broadway 2019

I Spy a Spy is an original musical with music by Sohee Youn, lyrics by Jamie Jackson, and book by Youn & Jackson. The original Off-Broadway production began previews on July 6 and had an official opening night on July 18 Off-Broadway at the St Clements Theatre. The original production ended its limited engagement early on August 10 after 10 previews and 26 regular performances.

== Development ==
Over the course of 7 years, the musical went through 6 readings and 3 workshops. The musical held development lab presentations on March 21 and 22, 2019.

== Original production ==
The World Premiere/Off-Broadway production was produced by two time Tony Award Nominated Producer Eric Krebs and is directed and choreographed by Bill Castellino. The creative team features musical director Dan Pardo, set designer James Morgan, costume designer Tyler Holland, lighting designer Michael Gottlieb, sound designer Dave Ferdinand, associate director Joseph Hayward, and assistant choreographer Victoria Casillo. Casting is by Michael Cassara, CSA.

== Musical numbers ==
Act 1

- The American Dream – The Company
- You Will See Me – Jose, Alina
- If I Could Be You – Jose, Alina
- This City's Gone to Hell – Sunny, Abdul
- Is It Just Me – Jose and Company
- Home – Jose
- Fresh Meat – Alina, Influencers
- You Looked at Me – Jose

Act 2

- Where Love Goes Wrong – Jose, Alina, Sunny, Abdul and Company
- Natural Assets – Prisciliana and her gang
- I Spy a Spy – Jose and Company
- I Spy a Spy/Natural Assets (reprise) – Jose, Alina and Company
- So Long – Alina, Female Ensemble
- Only a Russian – Cold Borscht, Beef Stroganoff, Russian Agents
- Finale – The Company

== Roles and original cast ==
Character	Workshop (2016) The Playroom Theater	Off-Broadway (2019) St Clements Theatre
José Rodríguez	Robert Ariza	Andrew Mayer
Alina Orlova	Mara Davi	Emma Degerstedt
Sunny Park	Erin Quill	Hazel Anne Raymundo
Abdul Makhdoom	Bruce Warren	Sorab Wadia
Cold Borscht	Joseph Mahowald	Bruce Warren
Prisciliana Espinoza	Lauren Villegas	Nicole Paloma Sarro
Beef Stroganoff	Jacob L. Smith	John Wascavage
Agent Brown	Emily Stokes	Grace Choi
Agent Grey	Eddie Cooper	Lawrence E. Street
Lenny	-	James Donegan
Shape Shifter 1	-	Taylor Fields
Shape Shifter 2	-	Conor McShane

== Reception ==
The world premiere received mixed reviews from both audiences and critics.
