= Manoel Felciano =

American actor, singer, and songwriter

- Born: November 12, 1970 (age 55)
- Education: Yale University (BA); New York University (MFA)
- Occupations: Actor, singer, songwriter
- Years active: 2005–present

Manoel Felciano (born November 12, 1970) is an American actor, singer, and songwriter.

== Career ==
He received a humanities degree from Yale University. Felciano attended the Graduate Acting Program at New York University's Tisch School of the Arts, graduating in 2004. He joined the American Conservatory Theater (San Francisco)'s core acting program in 2009, having previously performed there in Edward Albee's At Home at the Zoo and Tom Stoppard's Rock 'n' Roll.

Felciano is known for playing Tobias Ragg in the 2005 Broadway revival of Sweeney Todd: The Demon Barber of Fleet Street, for which he was nominated for a Tony Award for Best Performance by a Featured Actor in a Musical. In this production, all of the actors played their own instruments, with Felciano playing the piano, violin and clarinet.

He appeared in the "Reprise" (Los Angeles) production of Sunday in the Park with George in January 2007. He appeared in the Williamstown Theatre Festival production of Three Sisters in July 2008, as "Andrei". He appeared at the Kennedy Center in Ragtime in April to May 2009, as "Tateh". He performed in the stage musical Anastasia at Hartford Stage (Connecticut) as "Gleb". The production ran from May 12 to June 12, 2016.

Profiled as an Adjunct Assistant Professor of Theatre by Columbia University School of the Arts in 2022.

== Personal life ==
His father is Richard Felciano, a contemporary composer and UC Berkeley Professor Emeritus, and his mother is Rita Felciano, a dance critic.

== Theatre credits ==
Broadway

- Cabaret - Swing (Broadway debut), 1998-1999
- Jesus Christ Superstar - Ensemble & u/s Judas Iscariot and Annas, 2000
- Brooklyn - u/s Taylor Collins, 2004-2005
- Sweeney Todd: The Demon Barber of Fleet Street - Tobias Ragg - (Tony Award nomination), 2005-2006
- Disaster! - Wealthy Man/Taxi Driver/Workman 2 & u/s Tony, Ted, & Maury, 2016
- Amelie - Raphael/Bretodeau, 2017
- To Kill a Mockingbird - Horace Gilmer, 2019
- Dear Evan Hansen - Larry Murphy, 2022
- Parade - Tom Watson, 2023

Off-Broadway

- Much Ado About Nothing, 2004
- Shockheaded Peter, 2005
- Trumpery, 2007
- Ragtime - Tateh, 2013
- The Changeling, 2016
- By the Way, Meet Vera Stark, 2019
- Parade, 2022

American Conservatory Theater

- Clybourne Park
- Round and Round the Garden
- The Caucasian Chalk Circle
- November
- Edward Albee's At Home at the Zoo
- Rock 'n' Roll
- A Christmas Carol

Regional (U.S.)

- Anastasia - Gleb (Hartford Stage), 2016
- Side Show (Kennedy Center), 2014
- Ragtime - Tateh (Kennedy Center), 2009
- Three Sisters (Williamstown Theatre Festival), 2008
- Sunday in the Park with George (Reprise Theatre Company), 2007

== Filmography ==
Film
Year	Film	Role
2009	Uncertainty	Greg
Television
Year	Title	Role
2009	Life on Mars	Bradley Thomas (Episode: "Let All the Children Boogie")
2009	The Unusuals	Jeremy Foer (Episode: "The Apology Line")
2010	Trauma	Frank (Episode: "Tunnel Vision")
2014	NCIS	CIA agent Jim Brisco (Episode: "Page Not Found")
2016	Elementary	Franklin (Episode: "A Study in Charlotte")

== Discography ==
Cast albums

- 1998 — Cabaret: The New Broadway Cast Recording
- 2004 — Brooklyn: The Musical (2004 Original Broadway Cast)
- 2005 — Sweeney Todd (2005 Broadway Revival Cast)
- 2017 — Amélie - A New Musical (Original Broadway Cast Recording)

Solo recordings

  - 2008 — Moonshot (Debut album)
  - Tracks: 1/Keep it Slow 2/Another Day 3/Ready to Fly 4/Time 5/Sing it to Me 6/Wake Up 7/Don't Feed The Beast 8/Faux Pas 9/More Than You Know 10/Louisiana 1927
