= Walter Charles =

American actor and singer (1945–2023)

Walter Charles (born Walter Charles Jacobsen; April 4, 1945 – August 3, 2023) was an American actor and singer.

Charles made his Broadway debut in Grease in 1972. Additional Broadway credits include 1600 Pennsylvania Avenue (1976), Sweeney Todd: The Demon Barber of Fleet Street (1979), Cats (1982), La Cage aux Folles (1983), Me and My Girl (1987), Aspects of Love (1990), Kiss Me, Kate (2000), The Boys from Syracuse (2002), Big River (2003), The Woman in White (2005), The Apple Tree (2006) and Anything Goes (2011). He also originated the role of Ebeneezer Scrooge in A Christmas Carol at The Theater at Madison Square Garden in 1994. He played Max von Mayerling in the Toronto production of Sunset Boulevard in 1995. He reprised the role of Judge Turpin in the 2002 Kennedy Center and 2004 New York City Opera productions of Sweeney Todd.

In 1997 he portrayed Georges in La Cage aux Folles at the Pittsburgh Civic Light Opera with Tom Helm as the musical director.

Charles' screen credits include A Fine Mess, Fletch Lives, Weeds, and Prancer. On television he appeared in Cagney and Lacey, Kate and Allie, Law & Order, and Law & Order: Criminal Intent.

Walter Charles died of complications from frontotemporal dementia on August 3, 2023, at the age of 78. He is survived by his wife, Leslie Thompson.

== Stage credits ==
Year	Title	Role	Location
1970–1972	1776	Joseph Hewes u/s Thomas McKean u/s John Hancock	US National Tour
1972	1776	John Dickinson	Bergen Mall Shopping Center
1972–1974	Grease	Vince Fontaine	US National Tour
1975	Grease	Vince Fontaine	Royale Theatre, Broadway
1976	1600 Pennsylvania Avenue	Delegate of New Jersey / Ordway / Singer	Mark Hellinger Theatre, Broadway
1977	Jesus Christ Superstar	Caiaphas	Paper Mill Playhouse
1978	Man of La Mancha	Dr. Sanson Carrasco / The Duke	US National Tour
1979–1980	Sweeney Todd: The Demon Barber of Fleet Street	Ensemble u/s Sweeney Todd	Uris Theatre, Broadway
1980	Anyone Can Whistle	Treasurer Cooley	Berkshire Theatre Festival
1980–1981	Sweeney Todd: The Demon Barber of Fleet Street	Passerby / Ensemble u/s Sweeney Todd u/s Judge Turpin	US National Tour
1982–1983	Cats	Chorus u/s Old Deuteronomy	Winter Garden Theatre, Broadway
1983–1984	La Cage aux Folles	Renaud u/s Albin Mougeotte u/s Georges Baldi u/s Edouard Dindon	Palace Theatre, Broadway
1984–1985	La Cage aux Folles	Albin Mougeotte	Golden Gate Park
1984–1985	La Cage aux Folles	Albin Mougeotte	Pantages Theatre
1985–1987	La Cage aux Folles	Albin Mougeotte	Palace Theatre, Broadway
1987	Kismet	Hajj	Heinz Hall
1987–1988	Me and My Girl	Herbert Parchester	US National Tour
1988	La Cage aux Folles	Georges Baldi	Paper Mill Playhouse
1990–1991	Aspects of Love	Marcel Richard u/s Sir George Dillingham	Broadhurst Theatre, Broadway
1990–1991	Aspects of Love	Sir George Dillingham	Broadhurst Theatre, Broadway
1991	Man of La Mancha	Don Quixote / Miguel de Cervantes	Artpark
1992	Gypsy	Herbie	Valley Forge Music Fair
1992	Gypsy	Herbie	Westbury Music Fair
1993	Martin Guerre	Martin Guerre / Jacques Boeri	Hartford Stage
1993–1994	La Cage aux Folles	Georges Baldi	US National Tour
1994	Kismet	Hajj	5th Avenue Theatre
1994	A Christmas Carol	Ebenezer Scrooge	The Theater at Madison Square Garden
1995	Call Me Madam	Cosmo Constantine	New York City Center
1995	Follies	Benjamin Stone	5th Avenue Theatre
1995–1997	Sunset Boulevard	Max von Mayerling	Ford Centre for the Performing Arts
1997	La Cage aux Folles	Georges Baldi	Benedum Center
1998	Follies	Benjamin Stone	San Jose Center for the Performing Arts
1998	La Cage aux Folles	Georges Baldi	US National Tour
1998	Man of La Mancha	Don Quixote / Miguel de Cervantes	Westbury Music Fair
1998–1999	Wit	Mr. Bearing / Harvey Kelekian	MCC Theater
1998–1999	Wit	Mr. Bearing / Harvey Kelekian	Union Square Theatre
1999–2000	Kiss Me, Kate	Harrison Howell	Martin Beck Theatre, Broadway
2002	Sweeney Todd: The Demon Barber of Fleet Street	Judge Turpin	Kennedy Center
2002	Company	Larry	Kennedy Center
2002	The Boys from Syracuse	Aegean	American Airlines Theatre, Broadway
2003	Big River	Preacher / Doctor / Voice of Judge / Voice of Duke / Voice of First Man / Ensemble	American Airlines Theatre, Broadway
2004	Me and My Girl	Sir John Tremayne	Benedum Center
2004	Sweeney Todd: The Demon Barber of Fleet Street	Judge Turpin	New York City Opera
2004	Annie	Oliver "Daddy" Warbucks	The Muny
2005	Big River	Voice of Duke / Doctor / Judge Thatcher	Ford's Theatre
2005–2006	The Woman in White	Mr. Fairlie	Marquis Theatre, Broadway
2006	Hello, Dolly!	Horace Vandergelder	Paper Mill Playhouse
2006	Cabaret	Herr Schultz	Arena Stage
2006–2007	The Apple Tree	King Arik / Mr. Fallible / Producer	Studio 54, Broadway
2007–2008	My Fair Lady	Colonel Hugh Pickering	US National Tour
2008	Dr. Seuss' How the Grinch Stole Christmas! The Musical	Old Max	US National Tour
2009	Sweeney Todd: The Demon Barber of Fleet Street	Judge Turpin	Casa Mañana
2010	Sunday in the Park with George	Charles Redmond / Mr.	Arden Theatre Company
2010	Damn Yankees	Joe Boyd	The Muny
2011–2012	Anything Goes	Captain	Stephen Sondheim Theatre, Broadway
2012	Sunset Boulevard	Max von Mayerling	Benedum Center
2015	La Cage aux Folles	Georges Mougeotte	The Wick Theatre and Costume Museum
