= Jamie Jackson (actor) =

Australian actor

- Born: August 20, 1967 (age 58); Sydney, Australia
- Occupations: Actor, stand-up comedian, singer, playwright, lyricist
- Years active: 1984–present
- Spouse: SoHee

Jamie Jackson (born January 24, 1967) is an Australian actor, singer, playwright and stand-up comedian who has appeared in film, stage and television. His television appearances include Water Rats, The Blacklist, and Flight of the Conchords. His Broadway credits include leading roles in Doctor Zhivago, Soul Doctor, Wicked, and Sweeney Todd: The Demon Barber of Fleet Street.

Jackson studied acting at the National Institute of Dramatic Art in Sydney, and attended the NYU Tisch School of the Arts, where he studied musical theatre writing under the tutelage of Sarah Schlesinger. He also studied standup comedy at the American Comedy Institute with Stephen Rosenfield.

In 1998 he was awarded and Associate Fellowship through Mike Walsh Fellowships.

Jackson also was the lyricist and author of I Spy a Spy. After 7 years of 3 workshops, 2 lab presentations, and 6 readings the show premiered Off-Broadway in 2019 at the St Clements Theatre.

== Filmography ==
Film and Television
Year	Title	Role	Notes
1984	Prisoner	Interviewer 3 / Lois	Episodes: #1430 - Interviewer 3, #1453 - Lois
1990	The Flying Doctors	Stan	Episode: "A Place for the Night"
1992	The Girl Who Came Late	Neville Lipsky	
1993	A Country Practice	Andrew Rendell	Four episodes
1995	Flipper	Abernathy	Episode: "Treasure Hunt"
1996	Water Rats	Glenn Forbes	Episodes: "Lie Down with Dogs", "The Shaft"
1996	G.P.	Steve Miller	Episode: "Ding Dong Dell"
1997	Domesticated Animals	Jack	Short
1997	Wildside	Father Geoff Ryan	Episode: #1.4
1997	Children's Hospital	Peter	
1998	Praise	James	
2000	Brother	Mr. Smarts	Short
2006	.38 Thriller	Nathan	Short
2007	Portrait of a Whig	Dick Driben	Short
2009	Flight of the Conchords	Australian	Episode: "The Tough Brets"
2009	The Triumph of William Henry Harrison	Dick Driben	
2009	Black Site	Manager	
2010	English20	Charles Aston	Video
2011	Nexus	John	Short
2012	Smash	Keyboardist	Episode: "Hell on Earth"
2012	White Alligator	Gary	
2013	Zero Hour	Reverend Mark	Episodes: "Suspension", "Sync", "Hands", "Ratchet"
2013	The Blacklist	Ranko Zamani	Episode: "Pilot"
2014	Unforgettable	Victor	Episode: "Flesh and Blood"
2014	My Man Is a Loser	The Australian	
2014	Person of Interest	Janis	Episode: "Wingman"
2017	The Greatest Showman	Boss	
2018	Quantico	Gavin Pillay	Recurring role

== Stage ==
Theatre
Year	Title	Role	Notes
2007-2008	Dirty Rotten Scoundrels	Lawrence Jameson	US tour
2009	Dirty Rotten Scoundrels	s/b Lawrence Jameson	Patchogue Theatre
2010	Annie	Oliver "Daddy" Warbucks	Fulton Opera House
2010-2011	The 39 Steps	Clown #1	Off-Broadway
2011	Sweeney Todd: The Demon Barber of Fleet Street	Sweeney Todd	Regional
2012	My Fair Lady	Professor Henry Higgins	Regional
2012	Phantom	Erik, The Phantom	Regional
2012	A Christmas Carol	Ebenezer Scrooge	Regional
2013	Soul Doctor	Father/Rebbe; u/s Shlomo	Broadway
2014	Sweeney Todd: The Demon Barber of Fleet Street	Bird Seller/Ensemble	Lincoln Center
2014	The Last Ship	Joe Fletcher; u/s Jackie White	Bank of America Theatre
2014	The Last Ship	Joe Fletcher; u/s Jackie White	Broadway
2015	Doctor Zhivago	Alexander Gromeko	Broadway
2016	The Secret Garden	Lieutenant Shaw	Concert
2016	I Spy a Spy	Director/Author/Lyricist	Workshop
2017	Sweeney Todd: The Demon Barber of Fleet Street	Judge Turpin	Off-Broadway
2018-2020	Wicked	Doctor Dillamond	Broadway
2019	I Spy a Spy	Author & Lyricist	Off-Broadway
2023-2024	Sweeney Todd: The Demon Barber of Fleet Street	Judge Turpin	Broadway
