= Beth Fowler =

American actress and singer (born 1940)

Elizabeth Fowler
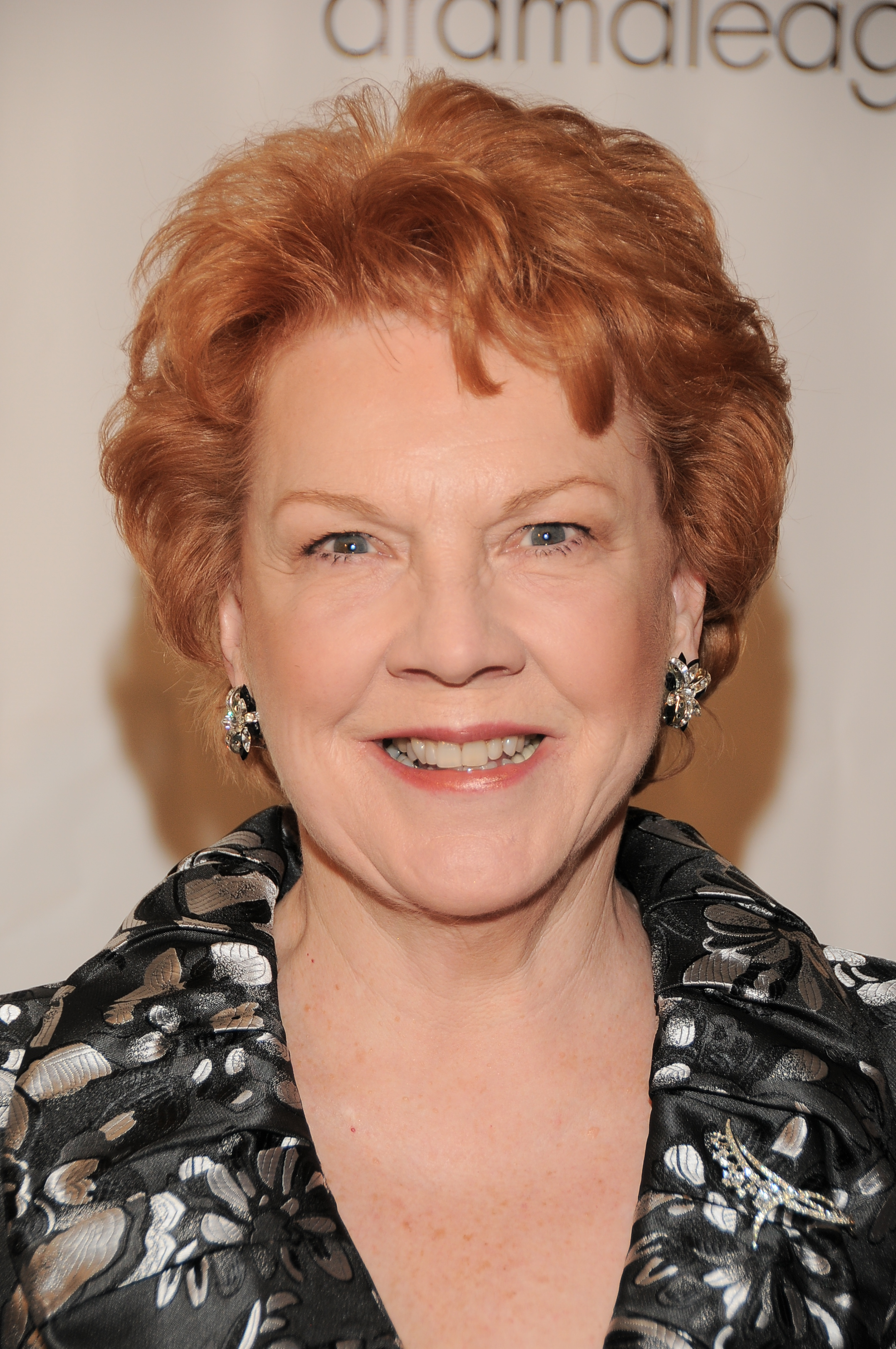
- Fowler at the Drama League Benefit Gala Honoring Angela Lansbury, February 8, 2010
- Born: Jersey City, New Jersey, U.S.
- Education: Caldwell University
- Occupations: Actress, singer
- Years active: 1970–present
- Spouse: Jack Witham

Beth Fowler is an American actress and singer, best known for her performances on Broadway and for her role as Sister Ingalls, on Orange Is the New Black. She is a two-time Tony Award nominee, as well as two-time winner for the Screen Actors Guild Award for Outstanding Performance by an Ensemble in a Comedy Series for her role as Sister Ingalls in the ensemble cast of Orange is the New Black.

== Life and career ==
Born in Jersey City, New Jersey, Fowler attended Caldwell University in New Jersey and was a music teacher for several years, as well as performing in community theater. Fowler attended Catholic schools and planned to enter a convent before becoming a music teacher.

She had a fondness for Broadway theatre when she decided to audition for Gantry in 1970. She was signed for the chorus and as understudy for the lead, but the show closed on opening night. She had better luck with her next outing, Stephen Sondheim's A Little Night Music. Additional Broadway credits include 1600 Pennsylvania Avenue; Peter Pan; Baby; Take Me Along; Teddy & Alice; the 1989 revival of Sweeney Todd, in which she portrayed Mrs. Lovett; Beauty and the Beast, in which she originated the role of Mrs. Potts; Bells Are Ringing; and The Boy from Oz, where she portrayed Peter Allen's mother Marion.

Fowler has been nominated for two Tony Awards: as Best Featured Actress in a Musical for The Boy From Oz and as Best Actress in a Musical for Sweeney Todd, which garnered her a Drama Desk Award nomination as well.

During her career, Fowler appeared in a number of films, including Sister Act and Sister Act 2: Back in the Habit, Friends & Family, Did You Hear About the Morgans?, I Don't Know How She Does It, and Mulan, in which she sang "Honor to Us All". On television, Fowler guest-starred on Law & Order, Law & Order: Criminal Intent, Ed, and Gossip Girl. In 2013, she began appearing in the recurring role as Sister Jane Ingalls in the comedy-drama series Orange Is the New Black. Along with cast, Fowler received the Screen Actors Guild Award for Outstanding Performance by an Ensemble in a Comedy Series.

== Personal ==
Since 2000, Fowler has been a resident of New Milford, New Jersey, having previously resided in Rutherford, Teaneck, Hawthorne, and Glen Rock.

Fowler married Jack Witham in 1976.

== Filmography ==
Year	Title	Role	Notes
1991	In the Line of Duty: Manhunt in the Dakotas	Joan Kahl	TV movie
1992	Sister Act	Choir Nun	
1993	Law & Order	Mrs. Wrenn	Episode: "Virus"
1993	Sister Act 2: Back in the Habit	Choir Nun	
1998	Mulan	Bather	Voice
2000	Ed	Molly's Mom	Episode: "The Whole Truth"
2001	Friends & Family	Mrs. Torcelli	
2006	Law & Order: Criminal Intent	Margaret Collo	Episode: "On Fire"
2008	Back to Me	Beth	Short
2009	Did You Hear About the Morgans?	Ma Simmons	
2010	The Extra Man	Ms. Marsh	
2011	Silhouette	Paige	
2011	I Don't Know How She Does It	Clark's Secretary	
2007–2012	Gossip Girl	Mistress of Ceremonies	3 episodes
2013–2016	Orange Is the New Black	Sister Jane Ingalls	32 episodes Recurring role Screen Actors Guild Award for Outstanding Performance by an Ensemble in a Comedy Series (2015, 2016)

== Stage credits ==
Year	Title	Role	Venue	Ref.
1970	Gantry	Deaf Man's Wife	Broadway, George Abbott Theatre	
1973	A Little Night Music	Mrs. Segstrom	Broadway, Shubert Theatre	
1976	1600 Pennsylvania Avenue	Ensemble	Broadway, Mark Hellinger Theatre	
1979	Peter Pan	Mrs. Darling	Broadway, Lunt-Fontanne Theatre	
1983	Baby	Arlene McNally	Broadway, Ethel Barrymore Theatre	
1985	Take Me Along	Lily Miller	Broadway, Martin Beck Theatre	
1987	Teddy & Alice	Edith Roosevelt	Broadway, Minskoff Theatre	
1989	Sweeney Todd: The Demon Barber of Fleet Street	Mrs. Lovett	Broadway, Circle in the Square Theatre	
1994	Beauty and the Beast	Mrs. Potts	Broadway, Palace Theatre	
2001	Bells are Ringing	Sue	Broadway, Plymouth Theatre	
2003	The Boy from Oz	Marion Woolnough	Broadway, Imperial Theatre	
2007	Inherit the Wind	Mrs. Brady	Broadway, Lyceum Theatre	

== Awards and nominations ==
Year	Award	Category	Work	Result	Ref.
1989	Drama Desk Awards	Drama Desk Award for Outstanding Actress in a Musical	Sweeney Todd: The Demon Barber of Fleet Street	Nominated	
1990	Tony Awards	Best Actress in a Musical	Sweeney Todd: The Demon Barber of Fleet Street	Nominated	
1990	Outer Critics Circle Awards	Outstanding Actress in a Musical	Sweeney Todd: The Demon Barber of Fleet Street	Nominated	
2004	Tony Awards	Best Featured Actress in a Musical	The Boy from Oz	Nominated	
2015	Screen Actors Guild Awards	Outstanding Performance by an Ensemble in a Comedy Series	Orange is the New Black	Won	
2016	Screen Actors Guild Awards	Outstanding Performance by an Ensemble in a Comedy Series	Orange is the New Black	Won	
