= Cassandra Syndrome (band) =

Gothic metal band

- Origin: Frederick, Maryland, United States
- Genre: Gothic metal
- Years active: 2005–2014
- Label: Figmental Records
- Members: Irene Jericho; Chris Kackley; Jen Tonon; Jay Jericho; Matt Farkas; Greg King
- Past members: Brett McCoy; BJ Robey; Katie Doherty; Joe Cariola

Cassandra Syndrome was a gothic metal band from Frederick, Maryland formed in 2005. The band last consisted of founder, lyricist and frontwoman Irene Jericho, lead guitarist Chris Kackley, rhythm guitarist Jen Tonon, bassist Joe Cariola and percussionist Jay Jericho. The band released one EP and three studio albums.

== History ==
=== Formation and early works (2005–2008) ===
In November 2005, Irene Jericho, Jay Jericho, BJ Robey and Brett McCoy decided to form a new band after working together in folk rock band Revel Moon. They brought on bassist Joe Cariola to fill out the lineup. The newly formed band started playing bars and Pagan festivals on the East Coast. The band's name, according to the band's website, is a reference to the Cassandra metaphor. The band felt the name would be appropriate due to the politically charged and socially conscious tone of their lyrics. In December 2006, Chris Kackley joined Cassandra Syndrome as lead guitarist after Brett McCoy left the band to pursue other projects. In the same year the band entered the studio for the first time to record its first EP, titled Dissent Into Heresy. The EP was released in May 2007. For the next two years the band toured throughout the Mid-Atlantic states. In January 2008, BJ Robey left the band for personal reasons. The band continued as a four piece.

=== Of Patriots and Tyrants until split (2008–2014) ===
In February 2008, Figmental Records signed the band onto their label. Keith Center and Jeremy Rodgers of The Dreamscapes Project and Figmental Records signed on to produce the band's first full-length album, Of Patriots and Tyrants. The album was released February 7th, 2009. Dr. T of Sonic Cathedral Webzine described the album as "metal, with a first rate female soprano driving the train...a metal based call to arms; a plea to recognize that life is fragile and that the earth that supports it must be nurtured." During the last few months of production on Of Patriots and Tyrants, Katie Doherty joined Cassandra Syndrome as rhythm guitarist. The band debuted their new lineup at the album's release party. Jen Tonon joined Cassandra Syndrome in March 2010 after Katie Doherty left the band for personal reasons. In 2011 the band released their 2nd full-length album Satire X with a release party at Rams Head Live!. The band later had two personnel changes and in 2014 released their third and final album The Shadow Requiem. They played their last show and subsequently announced their split in September of that year.

== Band members ==
=== Last lineup ===
- Irene Jericho - lead vocals (2005 - 2014)
- Jay Jericho - Zendrum percussion, backing vocals (2005 - 2014)
- Chris Kackley - lead guitar (2006 - 2014)
- Jen Tonon - rhythm guitar, backing vocals (2010 - 2014)
- Matt Farkas - keyboard (2012 - 2014), electric bass (2013 – 2014)

=== Former ===
- Brett McCoy - lead guitar (2005 - 2006)
- BJ Robey - rhythm guitar, backing vocals (2005 - 2008)
- Joe Cariola - electric bass, backing vocals (2005 - 2012)
- Katie Doherty - rhythm guitar, backing vocals (2008 - 2010)
- Greg King - electric bass (2012)
- Jack Sossman – electric bass (2013)

== Discography ==
- Dissent Into Heresy (2007)
- Of Patriots and Tyrants (Figmental Records, 2009)
- Satire X (Figmental Records, 2011)
- The Shadow Requiem (Figmental Records, 2014)
