= Edmund Lyndeck =

American actor

- Born: October 4, 1925; Baton Rouge, Louisiana, U.S.
- Died: December 14, 2015 (aged 90); Erie, Pennsylvania, U.S.
- Occupations: Actor, singer
- Years active: 1970–2015
- Known for: Sweeney Todd: The Demon Barber of Fleet Street, Into the Woods

Edmund Lyndeck (October 4, 1925 – December 14, 2015) was an American actor and musical theatre performer. He is best known for originating the roles of Judge Turpin in Sweeney Todd: The Demon Barber of Fleet Street and Cinderella’s Father in Into the Woods. He later took over the role of the Mysterious Man in Into the Woods.

His other Broadway credits include 1776, Mrs. Warren's Profession, A Doll's Life, and Merlin, and he also played Sir Danvers Carew in the 1990 world premiere of Jekyll & Hyde.

== Stage ==
Lyndeck, a former college professor, spent over a dozen years in stock and regional theater before making his Broadway debut in the original production of 1776. After originating the role of John Witherspoon, Lyndeck went on to play Stephen Hopkins, Dr. Lyman Hall, and Charles Thomson before ending up on tour as John Dickinson.

His best-known role is the evil Judge Turpin in the original production of Stephen Sondheim's Sweeney Todd, which he also repeated for the first national tour, the 1980 television broadcast, and a 1994 production at the North Shore Music Theatre. He earned a Drama-Logue Award for his performance in the tour's Los Angeles berth. He followed up Sweeney Todd with another Stephen Sondheim musical, Into the Woods, originating the role of Cinderella's Father and later playing the Mysterious Man as well. His other Broadway credits include Mrs. Warren's Profession, A Doll's Life, and Merlin.

Lyndeck worked frequently in Pennsylvania regional theater. For many years he was a fixture at the Pittsburgh Civic Light Opera — most notably as Scrooge in their annual musical version of A Christmas Carol, a role he performed almost every year from 1992 to 2007.

== Film and television ==
Lyndeck appeared occasionally on film and television. He was a contract player on a now-defunct soap opera, The Doctors, and has had guest roles in series like Ed, The Cosby Show, and Law & Order: Special Victims Unit. His best-known film role is as the marijuana-smoking grandfather in Road Trip; he is also known for his appearance in Adam Sandler's Big Daddy as Mr. Herlihy, You Don't Mess with the Zohan as the Pharmacist, and his most recent appearance in The Notorious Bettie Page. He also did voiceovers for numerous television and film documentaries.

== Death ==
Lyndeck died December 14, 2015, aged 90.

== Acting credits ==
=== Theatre ===
Year	Title	Role	Notes
1943	Ziegfeld Follies	Ben Yost's Vi-King	
1963	Around the World in 80 Days	M. Gasse / Maharajah of Panjipur / Silk Hat Harry	
1969-1972	1776	Rev. John Witherspoon u/s Charles Thomson u/s Dr. Lyman Hall u/s Stephen Hopkins u/s Thomas Jefferson	Broadway
1969-1972	1776	Stephen Hopkins	Broadway
1969-1972	1776	Dr. Lyman Hall	Broadway
1969-1972	1776	Stephen Hopkins u/s Charles Thomson	Broadway
1972	The King and I	The Kralahome	
1976	Mrs. Warren's Profession	u/s Mr. Praed	Broadway
1976	1776	John Dickinson	Tour
1977	Piaf...A Remembrance	Louis Leplee	
1979	Sweeney Todd: The Demon Barber of Fleet Street	Judge Turpin	Broadway
1980-1981	Sweeney Todd: The Demon Barber of Fleet Street	Judge Turpin	National Tour
1982	A Doll's Life	Eric	Broadway
1982	A Doll's Life	Eric	Los Angeles
1983	Merlin	The Wizard	Broadway
1983	Oliver!	Fagin	Regional
1985	Carousel	Dr. Seldon	Regional
1985	My Fair Lady	Colonel Hugh Pickering	Regional
1987-1989	Into the Woods	Cinderella's Father s/b The Narrator / The Mysterious Man	Broadway
1987-1989	Into the Woods	The Mysterious Man / Cinderella's Father s/b The Narrator	Broadway
1989	Artist Descending A Staircase	u/s Beauchamp u/s Martello u/s Donner	
1990	Jekyll & Hyde	Sir Danvers Carew	Premiere
1991	Grand Hotel	Colonel-Doctor Otternschlag	Broadway
1992-2007	A Musical Christmas Carol	Ebeneezer Scrooge	Annual Regional Musical
1993	Grand Hotel	Colonel-Doctor Otternschlag	Regional
1994	Sweeney Todd: The Demon Barber of Fleet Street	Judge Turpin	Regional
1995	The Secret Garden	Ben Weatherstaff	Regional
1996	1776	Stephen Hopkins	Regional
1997	Into the Woods	Cinderella's Father	10th Anniversary Concert Broadway
1999	Grand Hotel	Colonel-Doctor Otternschlag	Regional
2003	My Fair Lady	Colonel Hugh Pickering	Regional
2004	1776	Stephen Hopkins	Regional
2005	Carousel	Starkeeper / Dr. Seldon	Regional

=== Film ===
Year	Title	Role	Notes
1982	Sweeney Todd: The Demon Barber of Fleet Street	Judge Turpin	TV movie Musical
1999	Big Daddy	Mr. Herlihy	
2000	Road Trip	Barry's Grandpa	
2005	The Notorious Bettie Page	Father Egan	
2006	The Ex	Mr. Hordhaus	
2007	Enchanted	Derelict Old Man	
2008	You Don't Mess with the Zohan	Pharmacist	
2009	The Good Heart	Barber	
2009	Splinterheads	Albert	
2010	Wall Street: Money Never Sleeps	Patient	
2013	The Big Wedding	Elderly Husband	

=== Television ===
Year	Title	Role	Notes
1970-73	The Doctors	Dr. Carl Hendryx	69 episodes (uncredited and credit only)
1990	The Cosby Show	Mr. Bingham	Episode: What It's All About
1991	American Playhouse	Cinderella's Father	Episode: Into the Woods
2000	Ed	Charlie Hudson/Molly's Grandfather	2 episodes
2001	Law & Order	Howard Eastman	Episode: Armed Forces
2004	Law & Order: Special Victims Unit	Mr. Zelman	Episode: Bound
2005	Third Watch	Priest	Episode: How Do You Spell Belief?
2011	The Onion News Network	Old Gilgoff	Episode: Enter the Factzone
