= Jack Eric Williams =

American singer

- Born: Jack Eric Williams; March 28, 1944; Odessa, Texas, U.S.
- Died: January 28, 1994 (aged 49) New York City, U.S.
- Genres: Musical theatre
- Occupations: Composer, lyricist, actor, director
- Years active: 1976–1993

Jack Eric Williams (March 28, 1944 – January 28, 1994) was an American actor, composer and lyricist for stage and film. He is most remembered for originating the role of Beadle Bamford in Stephen Sondheim's Sweeney Todd. Williams died in New York City on January 28, 1994, from cardiac arrest due to complications of diabetes.

== Performer ==
Jack Eric Williams appeared off-Broadway as Max in a 1974 production of Harold Pinter's The Homecoming at the Wonderhorse Theater. He made his Broadway debut in 1976 in the Lincoln Center revival of Kurt Weill's Threepenny Opera, singing in the ensemble and understudying the role of the Ballad Singer. He next appeared in Stephen Sondheim's 1979 masterpiece Sweeney Todd, originating the role of the villainous Beadle Bamford. Sondheim wrote the exceptionally-difficult vocal lines with Williams' voice in mind. His performances in both shows are preserved on their original cast albums. In 1981 he appeared in the controversial film Strong Medicine. A noted tenor, he once gave a command performance for the King and Queen of Sweden. Williams regularly performed his work in cabaret venues around New York. His one-man show, Songs and Other Devices: A Cabaret Recital (volumes 1-4) was performed at The Ballroom, Lone Star Cafe, Reno Sweeney, S.N.A.F.U., The Other End, and The Westbank Cafe.

== Composer ==
In spite of his high-profile Broadway appearances, Williams considered himself primarily a composer.

In the 1960s, Williams won numerous awards in composition from the Texas Manuscript Society, Texas Young Composers, and National Young Composers Societies.

In 1965, he won the National Grass Roots Opera Competition with The Hinge Tune, libretto by Elizabeth Lyne

Also in 1965, Williams was commissioned by the Budapest Madrigal Ensemble to compose a madrigal cycle based on various poets.

1971, Williams composed a 45-minute score for Yerma, by Federico Garcia Lorca, commissioned by the Summer Theatre of the University of South Carolina

In 1974 he was commissioned by the Tennessee Arts Commission to compose a setting for chorus, soloists, and orchestra for Malcolm Glass' poem, Visions From A Glass Eye

In 1980 Williams wrote the music to original lyrics by Bertolt Brecht for the play Galileo, originally written for and with Charles Laughton. He followed that with a dance score for choreographer Johanna Boyce's Waterbodies for the American Dance Festival. The work was performed in and around a swimming pool, rather than in a traditional theater.

In 1981 he composed the score for the movie thriller Nightmare -which was originally banned in the UK for its excessive violence and gore.

His musical biography of Frances Farmer, Mrs. Farmer's Daughter, was produced at the American Music Festival in Philadelphia in 1984 and Sheldon Larry directed Williams' 1984 musical, Romance Language, at Playwrights Horizons in New York City.

In 1986, The Public Theater commissioned Williams and Richard Isen to write an original ten-minute musical. The resulting show, Dear Someone, was performed at the theater. Williams also wrote another ten-minute lyric melodrama for the same competition entitled, "Oh! God, I Loved Harry! An Orgy of Grief".

Williams' most successful show was 1990s Swamp Gas and Shallow Feelings: A Brand New Nashville Musical Fable, which was work-shopped in 1988 and 1990 at the National Music Theater Conference of the Eugene O'Neill Theater Center, and again in 1991 at the National Music Theater Network as part of its Broadway Dozen Series. The work earned him the Richard Rodgers Award from the American Academy and Institute of Arts and Letters in 1990, and was produced by the Barter Theater in 2006.

== Personal ==
Jack Eric Williams was married to Martha Elizabeth Lyne until her death in 1993. He was survived by his son, Eden Payne Williams, and many notable friends including actress Angela Lansbury, and composer William Finn. His musical compositions and lyrics are now owned by inflagrante music productions. Inflagrante is owned by Eve Martineza, former singer and actress who worked closely with Jack Eric and administered his estate.
