= Erin Quill =

American actress, writer and singer

Erin Quill is an American actress, writer and singer of Chinese, Welsh, and Irish descent. She is a dual citizen of the United States and Australia. She was a member of the original Broadway cast of the Tony Award-winning musical Avenue Q.

== Early life and education ==
Quill is a graduate of Carnegie Mellon University in Pittsburgh and holds a Bachelor of Fine Arts in Vocal Performance.

== Career ==
Quill co-wrote the screenplay of the feature film The Mikado Project, based on the play produced by Lodestone Theatre Ensemble and written by Ken Narasaki and Doris Baizely, in which she also appeared. In Los Angeles, she performed in the all-Asian American cast of Maltby and Shire's musical, Closer Than Ever for Lodestone Theatre Ensemble's final season.

Quill has acted in a number of television series, including NYPD Blue, Damages, and NYC 22, as well as the feature film Man on a Ledge. She performed as Madame Liang in the 50th anniversary production of Flower Drum Song, and toured as Lady Thiang in The King & I.

Quill writes about diversity in theater on her blog, The Fairy Princess Diaries. She spoke up about the casting of mainly people of European descent in a new musical set in China that was being produced by La Jolla Playhouse called "The Nightingale". She wrote about the Royal Shakespeare Company's exclusion of Asian cast members in their production of "The Orphan of Zhao", which led to the rise of the British East Asian Actor movement, headed by Daniel York. In 2013 she posted about the portrayal of Asian women in Miss Saigon.

Quill made a speech at LA Stage Day in 2013 against 'yellowface' casting. She writes on theater and LGBT issues, and her work has been referenced in The New York Times, The LA Times, The International Business Times, Backstage, The Huffington Post, NPR, and Playbill.

Quill performs in and occasionally hosts charity events benefiting Desert Aids Project and for Broadway Cares/EFA. She was an original and continuing member of the cast of Sparkle: A Holiday Concert, and co-hosted Celebrity Doodles in 2014.

In 2017, Quill hosted a panel at BroadwayCon about ethnic diversity in theatre.
