= Michael Staniforth =

British actor (1942–1987)

- Born: 15 December 1942; Birmingham, England
- Died: 31 July 1987 (aged 44)
- Resting place: Hawkinge Cemetery

Michael Peter Staniforth (15 December 1942 – 31 July 1987), born in Selly Oak, Birmingham, was a British stage actor, best known role as ghostly jester Timothy Claypole, a mischievous medieval poltergeist, in the long-running BBC children's television comedy series Rentaghost.

== Life ==
He was born in Birmingham.

Staniforth's father was a sergeant major in the Army and so Michael's childhood was spent with his family in Germany, Egypt and Libya.

He emigrated to Australia at the age of 21 and two years later landed a role in South Pacific at The Menzies Theatre Restaurant in Sydney, where for the next few years he performed in a further 12 musicals, including Wonderful Town and Cole Porter's Out Of This World, followed by a national tour of The Boy Friend.

He returned to England in late 1969 and first appeared in the West End in Hair at the Shaftesbury Theatre. He also appeared in the Two Gentlemen Of Verona (as Speed) and Winnie The Pooh (Tigger) at the Phoenix Theatre. In 1977 he played the role of Paul in the original British cast of A Chorus Line, returning to the same venue (Theatre Royal, Drury Lane) three years later as the young Tobias in Sondheim's Sweeney Todd.

He appeared in the BBC's 1975 Christmas production Great Big Groovy Horse, a rock opera based on the story of the Trojan Horse, which was shown on BBC2. It was repeated on BBC1 in 1977.

Staniforth played Timothy Claypole from 1976, when the show first aired, until 1984, and was the longest-standing member of the cast. Claypole was a bearded medieval jester, dressed in motley and bells. He caused mayhem for the rest of the Rentaghost cast. Danny Birchall at BFI Screenonline noted:

The sheer energy of Michael Staniforth (who also performed the theme tune) as Claypole made it one of the longer-lasting children's television series, if not always the most fondly remembered.

Staniforth also composed, played and sang the Rentaghost theme music, although he had to re-write it as "concern grew that it was too close to The Exorcist."

In 1984, Staniforth had a significant role as CB the Red Caboose in the original line-up in the long-running Andrew Lloyd Webber stage musical Starlight Express.

Staniforth was gay. He died from an AIDS-related illness on 31 July 1987, aged 44. He was cremated in Golders Green Crematorium, London in August 1987. His ashes were later buried in a grave in Hawkinge Crematorium, which bears his name as well as his mother (who died in 1978) and father (who later died in 1995).
