= Ken Jennings (actor) =

American stage actor (born 1947)

Kenneth Jennings (born October 10, 1947) is an American stage actor, most famous for his role as Tobias Ragg in the 1979 Broadway premiere of Stephen Sondheim's Sweeney Todd: The Demon Barber of Fleet Street. Jennings received the 1979 Drama Desk Award for Outstanding Featured Actor in a Musical for this role. He has also performed in several other shows, including Urinetown in 2001.

Jennings was born in Jersey City, New Jersey. He attended St. Peter's Preparatory School and St. Peter's College, both Catholic schools located in his hometown of Jersey City.

He performed the voice of Dinty Doyle in the 1981 Rankin/Bass stop motion animated Christmas special The Leprechauns' Christmas Gold, as well as Hunter #2 in the 1982 animated film The Last Unicorn.

== NYC theatre credits ==
- 1975: All God's Chillun Got Wings – Shorty
- 1979: Sweeney Todd – Tobias Ragg
- 1985: Mayor – Ensemble
- 1989: Grand Hotel – Georg Strunk
- 1994: A Christmas Carol – Lamplighter/Ghost of Christmas Past
- 1997: London Assurance – Mr. Adolphus Spanker
- 1997: Side Show – The Boss
- 2001: Urinetown – Old Man Strong/Hot Blades Harry
- 2004: Silent Laughter – Lionel Drppinwithit/Max the Thug
- 2006: Mimi le Duck – The Gypsy

== Other performances ==
- Astuter Computer Revue at Epcot from October 1, 1982, to January 2, 1984
