= Ed Sanders (actor) =

British actor (born 1993)

- Sanders with his Great Dane, Blue.
- Born: Edward William Sanders; 4 February 1993 (age 33); East Sussex, England
- Other names: Edward Sanders, Eddy Atlantis
- Occupations: Actor, record producer, art entrepreneur
- Years active: 2007–present
- Height: 6ft (approx. 182 cm)
- Awards: Sierra Award for Youth in Film, PFCS Award for Best Performance by a Youth,
- Musical career
- Labels: Imagem Uk, Concord Music Publishing

Edward William Sanders (born 4 February 1993) is an English actor, singer, record producer, and art entrepreneur. He first gained recognition for his role as Tobias Ragg in the 2007 film Sweeney Todd: The Demon Barber of Fleet Street, for which he also contributed to the film's soundtrack. Sanders went on to appear in the 2011 historical adventure film Hugo as part of the ensemble cast. In addition to his work in film and music, Sanders is the co-founder of D'Stassi Art, a contemporary art gallery established in Shoreditch, London in 2017, specialising in street art and emerging international artists.

== Early life ==
=== Education ===
Sanders was educated at Copthorne Preparatory School and sat his GCSE Exams at Ardingly College in West Sussex. He then moved up to London and continued his education part-time at Kensington and Chelsea College, whilst working as an apprentice in recording studios across London.

== Art career ==
In 2017, Sanders co-founded the contemporary art gallery D'Stassi Art in Shoreditch, London. The gallery specialises in showcasing artists associated with the Lower East Side street art movement and emerging contemporary talent. According to Artnet News, the gallery has developed a reputation for presenting street-influenced artists within a fine art context and has hosted international exhibitions featuring artists such as Lady Pink, Angel Ortiz (LA II), and Trevor Andrew (GucciGhost).

In 2025, the gallery presented the first UK solo exhibition by pioneering graffiti artist Lady Pink, which was noted by The Guardian as a significant moment for New York street art in the London contemporary art scene.

== Music career ==
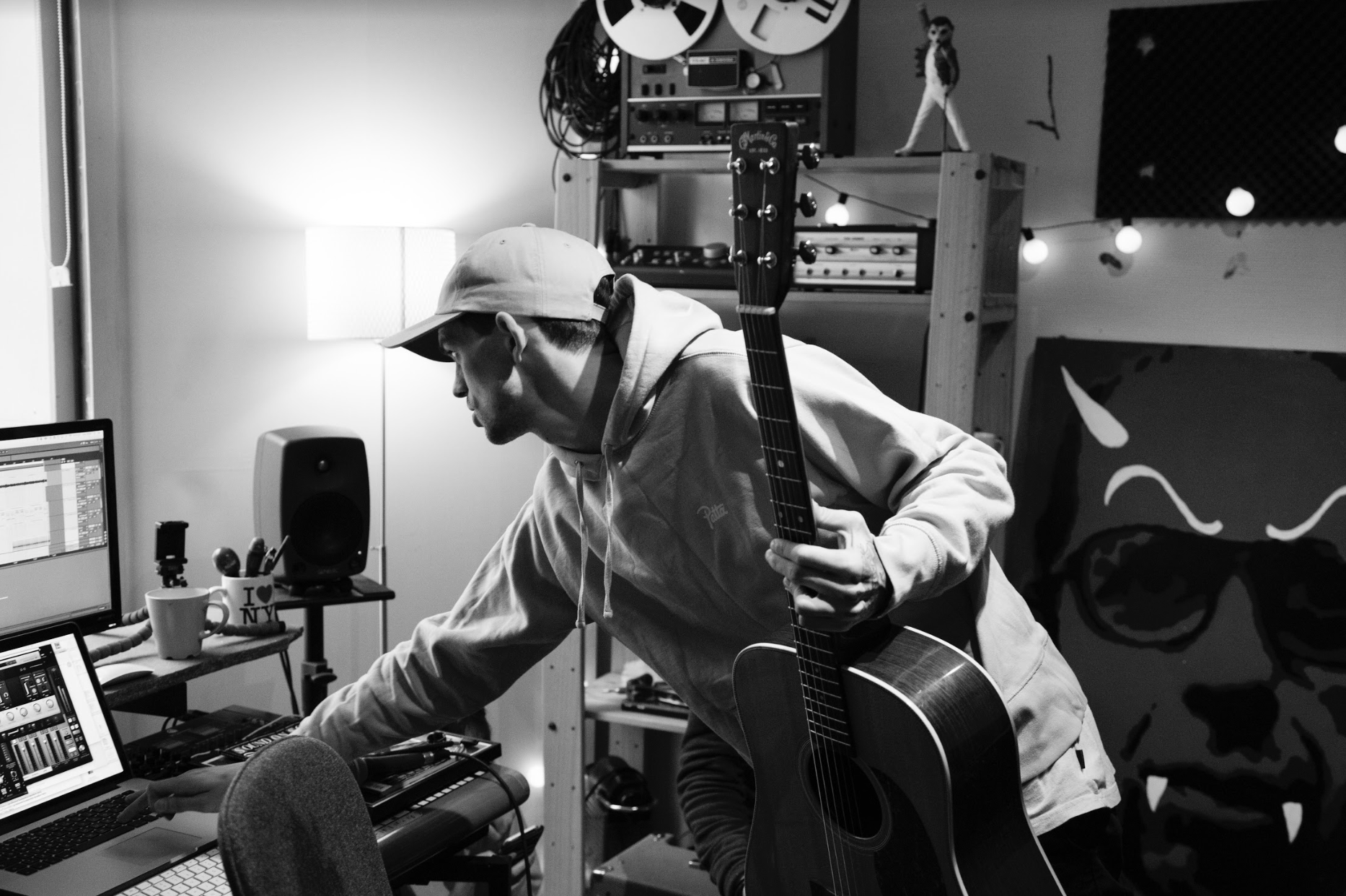
Eddy Atlantis in Bergen, Norway

After starting his career in the film industry, Sanders, under the name Eddy Atlantis, spent his teenage years learning and working in London's east end recording studios with a range of artists.

On 31 March 2015 he signed a global publishing deal with Imagem Music UK.

== Lokjaw Studios ==
At the beginning of 2019, Eddy opened his own studio space, Lokjaw Studios. Based in Primrose Hill, North West London, it houses various outboard and has a large control room, separate live room and vocal booth.

== Production discography ==
Year	Title	Artist	Album/EP	Co-writer	Producer	Co-Production
2016	Possession of a Weapon	Caitlyn Scarlett	Single	check	check	
2017	Paranoid	Cal	Single	check	check	
2017	Shangri-La	Caitlyn Scarlett	Single	check	check	
2017	Charlie	Cal	UNDO Pt.1	check	check	
2017	Neck Contour	Girli	Hot Mess EP	check	check	
2017	98	Santino Le Saint	Single	check	check	
2018	B.I.G.	Caitlyn Scarlett	Single	check	check	
2018	Validation	Afro B	Afrowave 2	check		check
2019	Skin	Dolapo	Single	check	check	
2019	Skin Remix feat. Alicai Harley & Br3nya	Dolapo	Single	check	check	
2019	F*ckboy	Cat Burns	Single	check	check	
2019	Woozy	Kwassa	fka kyko EP	check	check	
2020	B-list	aboutagirl	Single	check		
2020	Maybe	Hannie	Single	check	check	
2020	Practice Corvette	TylerxCordy	Single	check	check	
2021	Slipped	ADMT	Single	check		check
2021	Ruthless	Girli	Single	check	check	
2022	Late Night Calls	Imogen Mahdavi	Single	check	check	
2022	What's Yours (Isn't Mine)	Sonia Stein	Lessons From Earth, Pt. 1	check		
2022	Echo	Imogen Mahdavi	Single	check	check	
2024	Head Down	Cher Lloyd	Single	check		check

== Sync discography ==
Year	Title	Artist	Campaign	Co-writer	Producer/Arranger
2016	Harpoon on a Balloon	Lotus League	Rimmel London	check	check
2017	V8 Unicorn	Lotus League	Ford	check	check
2017	Tender (Rearrangement)	Blur	Co-op		check
2018	Ride	Lotus League	Ford	check	check

== Filmography ==
Year	Title	Role	Director	Notes
2006	Jupiter	Billy	Luke Menges	Short Film
2007	Sweeney Todd: The Demon Barber of Fleet Street	Tobias "Toby" Ragg	Tim Burton	
2011	Hugo	Young Tabbard's Brother	Martin Scorsese	
2017	Kill or be Killed	Liam Hutcherson	Aaron Ellis	Short film

== Awards and nominations ==
- Broadcast Film Critics Association Awards – Critics Choice Award for Best Young Actor for his role in Sweeney Todd: The Demon Barber of Fleet Street (2007) (nominated)
- Las Vegas Film Critics Society Awards 2007 – Sierra Award for Youth in Film – Male for his role in Sweeney Todd: The Demon Barber of Fleet Street (2007) (won)
- Phoenix Film Critics Society Awards 2007– PFCS Award for Best Performance by a Youth in a Lead or Supporting Role – Male for his role in Sweeney Todd: The Demon Barber of Fleet Street (2007) (won)
- Young Artist Award 2008 – Best Performance of a Supporting Young Actor in a feature film – Comedy or Musical for his role in Sweeney Todd: The Demon Barber of Fleet Street (2008) (nominated)
