= Mrs. Lovett =

Fictional character in many adaptations of the story Sweeney Todd

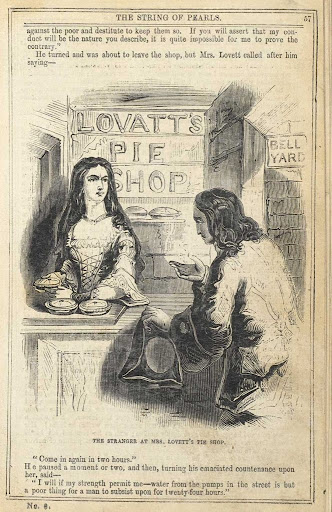
- Mrs. Lovett in the penny dreadful The String of Pearls: A Domestic Romance
- Portrayed by: Angela Lansbury (1979 Broadway); Dorothy Loudon (Lansbury's sub); Sheila Hancock (1980 West End); Beth Fowler (1989 Broadway); Julia McKenzie (1993 Off West End); Christine Baranski (1999 Los Angeles); Judy Kaye (2000 concert); Patti LuPone (2005 Broadway); Helena Bonham Carter (2007 film); Imelda Staunton (2012 West End); Emma Thompson (2014 concert); Lea Salonga (2019 Singapore); Larisa Dolina (2020 Taganka Theatre); Annaleigh Ashford (2023 Broadway); Sutton Foster (Ashford's replacement)

In-universe information
- Occupation: Baker
- Spouse: Albert Lovett (deceased)

Mrs. Lovett is a fictional character appearing in many adaptations of the story Sweeney Todd. Her first name is most commonly referred to as Nellie, although she has also been referred to as Amelia, Margery, Maggie, Sarah, Wilhelmina, and Claudetta. A baker from London, Mrs. Lovett is an accomplice and business partner of Sweeney Todd, a barber and serial killer from Fleet Street. She makes meat pies from Todd’s victims.

First appearing in the Victorian penny dreadful serial The String of Pearls, it is debated if she was based on an actual person or not. The character also appears in modern media related to Sweeney Todd including multiple stage and film adaptations. Her first appearance was on Broadway in 1979 by Angela Lansbury.

== Character overview ==
In every version of the story in which she appears, Mrs. Lovett is the business partner and accomplice of barber and serial killer Sweeney Todd; in some versions, she is also his lover. She makes and sells meat pies made from the flesh of Todd's victims.

Although Mrs. Lovett's character and role in the story are similar in each version, certain details vary according to the story's interpretation. In some versions, for example, Mrs. Lovett commits suicide by consuming poison when their crimes are discovered, while in others, Todd kills her himself or she is arrested and escapes execution by turning King's Evidence against Todd.

Her physical appearance varies from a slim and alluring beauty to a plump, homely lunatic. Her age is also differing in many adaptations; though it is never specifically stated in any versions, there are some (most noticeably in Sondheim's musical) where she is older than Todd, often by a difference of over fifteen years and others where she is around his age. Whether their relationship is platonic, romantic, or merely sexual also varies according to interpretation.

== Reception ==
In April 2024, Washington Post journalist Thomas Floyd met with eight notable actresses who have portrayed Mrs. Lovett. In their article, Floyd met with Julia McKenzie (1993 revival, National Theatre in London), Christine Baranski (1999, Ahmanson Theatre in Los Angeles, CA, and 2002, Kennedy Center in Washington, D.C.), Patti LuPone (2000, London Philharmonic, 2001, San Francisco Symphony, and 2005 Broadway revival in New York City, NY), Helena Bonham Carter (2007, film adaptation), Lea Salonga (2019, Theatre at Solaire in Manila, Sands Theatre in Singapore), Bryonha Marie (2023, Signature Theatre in Arlington, VA), Annaleigh Ashford (2023 Broadway revival in New York City, NY), and Sutton Foster (2024, replaced Ashford in Broadway revival).

The performers agreed that playing the iconic role was a great honor, and also a great responsibility. Both Baranski and LuPone recalled feeling intimidated when finding out they had been cast. Baranski recalled Stephen Sondheim stating that she was going to have fun playing the role, to which Baranski responded: "Fun? This is like scaling a mountain. This is terrifying."

The actresses took different approaches to preparing for the role. Baranski read London Labour and the London Poor by Henry Mayhew to take a deeper look into the priorities of a lower-class woman in Victorian England. Ashford, Salonga, Bonham Carter, and LuPone all revisited previous performances, including Angela Lansbury’s originating performance in 1979. Others took a more personal approach, such as Marie, who drew from her culture and background as a black woman to develop the character. The performers also voiced differences in their interpretations of the role. McKenzie saw Mrs. Lovett less as a villain and more as a product of her circumstances, whereas LuPone saw her as a manipulator and the true villain of the story.

Foster, Bonham Carter, and Solonga agree that Mrs. Lovett’s desperate need for love leads to her eventual demise, and LuPone theorized that the first lie she tells at the top of the show leads the character down the path of manipulation that leads to her fate. Ashford describes Mrs. Lovett’s arc as Shakespearean in how wild, broad, and grounded it is, and compared the character to Puck.
