= Jeff Keller =

American actor and singer

- Born: September 8, 1947 (age 77); Brooklyn, New York
- Occupation(s): Actor, singer
- Years active: 1972–2012
- Known for: The Phantom of the Opera

Jeff Keller is an American musical theatre actor. He is best known for being in the original Broadway cast of The Phantom of the Opera and later taking over the roles of Monsieur André and Firmin, as well as the title role.

Some of his other Broadway credits include roles in Dance a Little Closer, Fiddler on the Roof, and Sunday in the Park with George, as well as several others.

== Career ==
Keller made his Broadway debut in the cast of Candide in 1974. In 1976, Keller played the role of Perchik in the touring cast of Fiddler on the Roof. Later that year, he played the role in the Broadway revival. He was a replacement actor in the 1978 production of On the Twentieth Century. He originated roles in The 1940's Radio Hour, The Roast, and Dance a Little Closer. In 1984, Keller joined the original Broadway cast of Sunday in the Park with George understudying the title role. He would later take over several supporting roles while still understudying the title role. He played the roles of Billy and Louis ten years later in the Broadway Anniversary Concert.

In 1986, Keller started a 19-year stint in the Broadway company of The Phantom of the Opera. In the original cast, he was an ensemble member and understudied the Phantom. In 1989, he took over the role of Monsieur André when Cris Groenendaal was promoted to Phantom. In November 1990, he stepped into the title role for a month in between the stints of Steve Barton and Kevin Gray. In 1994, Keller again substituted in the title role for 3 months in between Marcus Lovett and Davis Gaines. He also played the role of Jacob Marley in the annual production of A Christmas Carol at The Theater at Madison Square Garden. In 2001, Keller switched roles with George Lee Andrews, "to keep things fresh", portraying Monsieur Firmin in Phantom.

== Stage credits ==
Year(s)	Production	Role	Notes
1973	The Roar of the Greasepaint – The Smell of the Crowd	Sir	Regional
1974–1976	Candide	2nd Recruiting Officer / Rich Jew / Judge / Man In Black / Cartagenian / Pirate / German Botanist / Guest	Broadway
1976	Fiddler on the Roof	Perchik	National tour
1976–1977	Fiddler on the Roof	Perchik	Broadway
1977	Camelot	Sir Lancelot du Lac	Regional
1978–1979	On the Twentieth Century	Max Jacobs	Broadway
1979–1980	The 1940's Radio Hour	Johnny Cantone	Broadway
1980	The Roast	s/b Charles Browning s/b Danny	Broadway
1983	Dance a Little Closer	Edward Dunlop	Broadway
1983–1984	The Music Man	Harold Hill	Alliance Theatre
1984	Sunday in the Park with George	u/s Georges Seurat / George	Broadway
1984–1985	Sunday in the Park with George	Billy Webster / Louis / A Man Lying on the Bank u/s Georges Seurat / George u/s Franz / Dennis u/s A Soldier / Alex u/s Jules / Bob Greenberg	Broadway
1985	Sunday in the Park with George	A Soldier / Alex u/s Georges Seurat / George	Broadway
1985–1986	Personals	Sam	Broadway
1986	Anything Goes	Billy Crocker	Regional
1986–1987	Sunday in the Park with George	Georges Seurat / George	Regional
1988–1989	The Phantom of the Opera	Marksman / Porter u/s The Phantom of the Opera	Broadway
1989–1990	The Phantom of the Opera	Monsieur Gilles André u/s The Phantom of the Opera	Broadway
1990	The Phantom of the Opera	The Phantom of the Opera	Broadway
1990–1994	The Phantom of the Opera	Monsieur Gilles André u/s The Phantom of the Opera	Broadway
1994	The Phantom of the Opera	The Phantom of the Opera	Broadway
1994	Sunday in the Park with George	Billy Webster / Louis	Broadway 10th Anniversary Concert
1994	A Christmas Carol	Jacob Marley	The Theater at Madison Square Garden
1994–2001	The Phantom of the Opera	Monsieur Gilles André u/s The Phantom of the Opera	Broadway
2001–2005	The Phantom of the Opera	Monsieur Richard Firmin u/s The Phantom of the Opera	Broadway
2012	A Letter to Harvey Milk	Harry Weinberg	New York Musical Theatre Festival
