= A Christmas Carol (musical) =

American stage musical

- Production logo from Ahrens and Flaherty's website
- Music: Alan Menken
- Lyrics: Lynn Ahrens
- Book: Lynn Ahrens
- Basis: Charles Dickens' novella A Christmas Carol
- Productions: 1994-2003 Madison Square Garden; 2004 Film; 2016 London concert

A Christmas Carol is a musical with music by Alan Menken, lyrics by Lynn Ahrens, and book by Mike Ockrent and Lynn Ahrens. The musical is based on Charles Dickens' 1843 novella of the same name. The show was presented annually at New York City's Theater at Madison Square Garden from December 1, 1994, to December 27, 2003.

== Productions ==
=== Madison Square Garden, New York (1994–2003) ===
A Christmas Carol premiered on December 1, 1994. It was performed annually in December at the Theater at Madison Square Garden in Madison Square Garden from December 1994 until December 2003.

The original 1994 production was directed by Mike Ockrent with choreography by Susan Stroman, sets by Tony Walton, costumes by William Ivey Long, lighting by Jules Fisher and Peggy Eisenhauer, sound by Tony Meola, projections by Wendall K. Harrington, and musical direction by Paul Gemignani. Walter Charles played Ebenezer Scrooge.

Terrence Mann, Tony Randall, Hal Linden, Roddy McDowall (in his final role), F. Murray Abraham, Frank Langella, Tim Curry, Tony Roberts, Roger Daltrey and Jim Dale have all played the role of Ebenezer Scrooge in subsequent productions of A Christmas Carol.

=== 2004 television film ===
In 2004, the production was adapted for television and produced by Hallmark Entertainment for NBC. It was directed by Arthur Allan Seidelman and features Kelsey Grammer as Ebenezer Scrooge, Jason Alexander as Jacob Marley, Jane Krakowski as the Ghost of Christmas Past, Jesse L. Martin as the Ghost of Christmas Present, Geraldine Chaplin as the Ghost of Christmas Yet To Be, and Jennifer Love Hewitt as Emily (named Belle in the book), Scrooge's former fiancée.

=== London concerts (2016–2020) ===
The musical made its London premiere on Monday December 19, 2016 at the Lyceum Theatre as a concert production played by London Musical Theatre Orchestra and produced by James Yeoburn and Stuart Matthew Price for United Theatrical. It starred Robert Lindsay as Ebenezer Scrooge, Alex Gaumond as Bob Cratchit, Carrie Hope Fletcher and her sister-in-law Giovanna Fletcher as Emily and Mrs Cratchit, Madalena Alberto as the Ghost of Christmas Past, Hugh Maynard as the Ghost of Christmas Present, Norman Bowman as Jacob Marley, Peter Polycarpou as Mr Fezziwig, and John Addison as Fred Anderson.

The concert production was again at the Lyceum on December 11 and 18, 2017, with Lindsay returning to the role of Scrooge.

On 17 December 2018, the production returned to the Lyceum Theatre again with Griff Rhys Jones as Scrooge.

From 7 December 2020 a new production of the staged concert with the London Musical Theatre Orchestra opened at the Dominion Theatre during the COVID-19 pandemic where the theatre was socially distanced, starring Brian Conley as Scrooge, Matt Willis as Bob Cratchit, Jacqueline Jossa as Emily/Ghost of Christmas Future, Lucie Jones as the Ghost of Christmas Past, Sandra Marvin as Mrs Fezziwigg, Martyn Ellis as Mr Fezziwigg, Cedric Neal as Ghost of Christmas Present, Jeremy Secomb as Jacob Marley, Rebecca Lock as Mrs Cratchit and Sam Oladeinde as Fred Anderson/Young Scrooge. The run was due to close on 2 January 2021, however due to the Government's tier 3 restrictions in London, the run finished early on 15 December 2020.

== Yearly MSG casts ==
| Character | 1994 Original Cast | 1995 | 1996 | 1997 | 1998 | 1999 | 2000 | 2001 | 2002 | 2003 Final Cast |
|---|---|---|---|---|---|---|---|---|---|---|
| Ebenezer Scrooge | Walter Charles | Terrence Mann | Tony Randall | Hal Linden Roddy McDowall | Roger Daltrey | Tony Roberts | Frank Langella | Tim Curry | F. Murray Abraham | Jim Dale |
| Bob Cratchit | Nick Corley | Nick Corley | Nick Corley | Todd Gross | Todd Gross | Nick Corley | Nick Corley | Nick Corley | Nick Corley | Nick Corley |
| Ghost of Christmas Past/ Lamplighter | Ken Jennings | Ken Jennings | Ken Jennings | Joel Blum | Ken Jennings | Didi Conn | Ken Jennings | Martin Moran | Justin Brill | Justin Brill |
| Ghost of Christmas Present/ Sandwichboard Man | Michael Mandell | Ben Vereen | Ben Vereen | Ken Page | Roz Ryan | Reginald VelJohnson | D'Ambrose Boyd | Gerry McIntyre | Gerry McIntyre | Gerry McIntyre |
| Ghost of Christmas Yet-To-Be | Theara J. Ward | Theara J. Ward | Valentina Kozlova | Christine Dunham | Christine Dunham | Christine Dunham | Christine Dunham | Catherine Batcheller | Catherine Batcheller | Catherine Batcheller |
| Ghost of Jacob Marley | Jeff Keller | Paul Kandel | Paul Kandel | Paul Kandel | Paul Kandel | Paul Kandel | Paul Kandel | Paul Kandel | Paul Kandel | Paul Kandel |
| Tiny Tim | Matthew Mezzacapa | Chris Marquette; Zach London | Matthew Ballinger; Pierce Cravens | Christopher Cordell; Patrick J.P. Duffey | Anthony Blair Hall; Christian Valiando | Dennis Michael Hall; Patrick Stogner | Jimmy Walsh; Patrick Stogner | Jimmy Walsh; Shadoe Brandt | Anthony Colangelo; Sky Jarrett | Anthony Colangelo; Graham Phillips |
| Fred Anderson | Robert Westenberg | Steve Blanchard | Greg Zerkle | Paul Jackel | John Sloman | James Judy | James Judy | Robert Westenberg | John Sloman | James Judy |
| Blind Hag/ Scrooge's Mother | Andrea Frierson Toney | Nicole Arrington (Hag); Barbara Marineau (Mother) | Joan Barber | Debra Cardona | Debra Cardona | Joan Barber | Joan Barber | Joan Barber | Joan Barber | Joan Barber |
| Mrs. Mops | Darcy Pulliam | Karen Murphy | Corinne Melancon | Marilyn Pasekoff | Marilyn Pasekoff | Marilyn Pasekoff | Marilyn Pasekoff | Marilyn Pasekoff | Karen Murphy | Karen Murphy |
| Scrooge at 18 | Michael Christopher Moore | Tom Stuart | Michael Moore | Tom Stuart | Joe Cassidy | Joe Cassidy | Joe Cassidy | Denton Tarver | Daniel Cochran | Daniel Cochran |
| Emily | Emily Skinner | Emily Skinner | Emily Skinner | Kate Dawson | Kristin Huxhold | Kristin Huxhold | Kate Dawson | Kate Dawson | Kristin Huxhold | Kristin Huxhold |
| Mr. Fezziwig | Gerry Vichi | Michael Cone | Ray Friedeck | Ray Friedeck | Daniel Marcus | Daniel Marcus | Daniel Marcus | Michael J. Farina | Roland Rusinek | Roland Rusinek |
| Mrs. Fezziwig | Mary Stout | Joy Hermalyn | Joy Hermalyn | Joy Hermalyn | Joy Hermalyn | Debra Cardona | Kelly Ellenwood | Kelly Ellenwood | Kelly Ellenwood | Kelly Ellenwood |
| Young Marley/ Undertaker/ Punch and Judy Man | Christopher Sieber | Ken Barnett | Ken Barnett | Ken Barnett | Ken Barnett | Ken Barnett | Ken Barnett | Ashton Byrum | Ashton Byrum | Ashton Byrum |
| Mr. Smythe | Joseph Kolinski | James Judy | James Judy | Chris Vasquez | Chris Vasquez | Chris Vasquez | Erick Pinnick | Joseph Kolinski | Joseph Kolinski | Chris Vasquez |
| Grace Smythe | Lindsay Jobe | Cara Horner; Joanna Howard | Cara Horner; Jennifer Blain | Olivia Oguma; Tavia Rivee Jefferson | Netousha Harris; Tavia Rivee Jefferson | Brittany Alexander Campbell; Marissa Gould | Amelia Harris; Catherine Marie Downey | Allison Fischer; Catherine Marie Downey | Carly Seyler; Vachelle Gil | Carly Seyler; Vachelle Gil |
| Mrs. Cratchit | Joy Hermalyn | Robin Baxter | Robin Baxter | Robin Baxter | Rachel Black | Whitney Webster | Whitney Webster | Whitney Webster | Whitney Webster | Whitney Webster |
| Old Joe/ Mr. Hawkins | Kenneth McMullen | Kenneth McMullen | Don Mayo | Kenneth McMullen | Kenneth McMullen | Kenneth McMullen | Kenneth McMullen | Kenneth McMullen | Kenneth McMullen | Kenneth McMullen |
| Sally Anderson | Natalie Toro | Stephanie Bast | Whitney Webster | Whitney Webster | La Tanya Hall | La Tanya Hall | La Tanya Hall | La Tanya Hall | La Tanya Hall | La Tanya Hall |
| Jonathon | Jason Fuchs | Evan J. Newman; Jason Fuchs | Evan J. Newman; Jason Fuchs | Adam Barruch; Christopher Marquette | Adam Barruch; Kennedy Kanagawa | Marshall Pailet; Matt Bowles | Gerard Canonico; Scott Owen Cumberbatch | Gerard Canonico; Paul Tiesler | Jimmy Walsh; Justin Riordan | Andrew Zutty; Jimmy Walsh |
| Scrooge at 8/ Ignorance | David Gallagher (plays Cratchit Child instead of Ignorance) | Matthew Ballinger; Zachary Petkanas | Evan Silverberg; Zachary Petkanas | Anthony Blair Hall; Joseph Louis Santos III | Dennis Michael Hall; Stephen Scarpulla | Jimmy Walsh; Johnny Cennicola | Justin Riordan; Nicholas Jonas | Anthony Colangelo; Evan Daves | Jonathan Demar; Kevin Carillo | Kevin Carillo; Zachary Goldstein |
| Scrooge at 12 | Ramzi Khalaf | Christopher Mark Petrizzo; Paul Franklin Dano | Christopher Mark Petrizzo; Matthew Hoffman | Evan Silverberg; Paul Franklin Dano | Gabriel Millman; Jesse McCartney | Andrew Keenan-Bolger; Kennedy Kanagawa | Johnny Cenicola; Patrick Dunn | Johnny Cenicola; Michael A. Mags | Jared Goldstein; Michael A. Mags | Jared Goldstein; Michael A. Mags |
| Fan (originally Fan at 10) | Jacy De Filippo; Olivia Oguma | Eliza Atkins Clark; Nathalie Paulding | Eliza Atkins Clark; Elizabeth Lundberg | Elizabeth Lundberg; Jenell Slack | Dana Chechile; Carissa Farina; Chloe Zeitounian | Lexine Bondoc; Tristin Mays | Lily Havala Wen; Lindsey Pickering | Jewel Restaneo; Lily Havala Wen | Jewel Restaneo; Madeleine Martin | Alexandra Sullivan; Kristin Klabunde |
| Judge/Poulterer/ Charity Man | Michael H. Ingram (Judge); Walter Willison (Poulterer/Charity Man) | | Michael H. Ingram | Roland Rusinek | Roland Rusinek | Roland Rusinek | Roland Rusinek | Wayne W. Pretlow | Duane Martin Foster | Duane Martin Foster |
| Scrooge's Father/ Undertaker/ Charity Man | Michael X. Martin (Father/Undertaker); Martin Van Treuren (Charity Man) | Michael X. Martin (Father/Undertaker); Wayne Pretlow (Charity Man) | Michael X. Martin (Father/Undertaker); Seth Malkin (Charity Man) | Wayne Schroder (Father/Undertaker); Wayne Pretlow (Charity Man) | Wayne Schroder | Wayne Schroder | Wayne Schroder | Wayne Schroder | Wayne Schroder | Wayne Schroder |
| Charity Man | Robert Ousley | Robert Ousley | Keith Byron Kirk | Erik Stein | David Aron Damane | Don Mayo | Erik Stein | Erik Stein | David Lowenstein | Erik Stein |
| Fan at 6/ Cratchit Child | Mary Elizabeth Albano | Olivia Oguma; Diana Mary Rice | Gemini Quintos; Diana Mary Rice | Gemini Quintos; Zoe Petkanas | combined with Fan at 10 | | | | | |
| Cratchit Child | Betsy Chang (Martha Cratchit) & Sean Thomas Morrissey | Anthony Roth Costanzo; Bobby Steggert | Girl does not appear, Boy added to Scrooge at 12 track | | | | | | | |
| Jack Smythe/ Ignorance | Andy Jobe | Jack Smythe does not appear, Ignorance added to Scrooge at 8 track | | | | | | | | |
| Match Girl | Arlene Pierret | does not appear | does not appear | does not appear | does not appear | does not appear | does not appear | does not appear | does not appear | does not appear |
| Punch and Judy Woman | Donna Lee Marshall | does not appear | does not appear | does not appear | does not appear | does not appear | does not appear | does not appear | does not appear | does not appear |
| Gravedigger | Bill Nolte | does not appear | does not appear | does not appear | does not appear | does not appear | does not appear | does not appear | does not appear | does not appear |
| Street Urchin/ Child/Swing | Christopher Mark Petrizzo; Justin Bartholemew Kamen; Matthew F. Byrne; P.J. Smith | does not appear | does not appear | does not appear | does not appear | does not appear | does not appear | does not appear | does not appear | does not appear |

Long Runs: Gail Pennington appeared all 10 years in the Ensemble
Paul Kandel appeared as the Ghost of Jacob Marley for 9 consecutive years, the longest any cast member appeared in one speaking role

== Synopsis ==
The opening numbers are "The Years Are Passing By" and "Jolly, Rich, and Fat". In later productions the two numbers are combined as "Jolly Good Time." Scrooge first encounters the three ghosts of Christmas in their real-world guises as a lamplighter (Past), a charity show barker (Present), and a blind beggar woman (Future) ("Nothing to Do With Me"). Scrooge's long-suffering employee Bob Cratchit, and Bob's son Tiny Tim, purchase a Christmas chicken ("You Mean More to Me").

The visit of the ghost of Jacob Marley ("Link By Link"), features a half-dozen singing, dancing spirits presented with various levels of makeup and special effects. One of these ghosts in this version is known to be an old colleague of Scrooge and Marley's, Mr. Haynes, who was said to be "mean to the bone", resulting in his charred skeleton. Other puns include a spirit with a safe embedded in his chest, who "never had a heart".

The Ghost of Christmas Past reinforces the character's signature theme of illuminating Scrooge's worldview ("The Lights of Long Ago"). One notable departure from Dickens' novella in this portion of the film is its depiction of Ebenezer Scrooge's father, identified as John William Scrooge, being sentenced to debtors' prison while his horrified family looks on; this scene was inspired by an actual occurrence from Dickens' own childhood.

The Ghost of Christmas Present ("Abundance and Charity" and "Christmas Together"), makes his point that Christmas is a time for celebration, generosity, and fellowship. The former takes place at a fantastical version of the charity show he was seen promoting on Christmas Eve, and the latter whisks Scrooge on a tour of London that includes the homes of his nephew Fred, his clerk Bob Cratchit, and Mr. Smythe, a recently widowed client of Scrooge's lending house.

The entire Christmas Future ("Dancing On Your Grave", "You Mean More to Me (Reprise)", and "Yesterday, Tomorrow, and Today"), culminates in Scrooge's awakening in his bedroom on Christmas morning.

"What a Day, What a Sky" bookends "Nothing to Do With Me", dramatizing Scrooge's new outlook as he races through the streets of London making amends. The show concludes with a reprise of "Christmas Together" featuring the entire cast.

== Scenes and musical numbers ==
=== 1994 version ===
Time: London, 1880

- "Overture" — Orchestra

Scene 1: A Graveyard Near St. Paul's Cathedral, Christmas Eve

- "The Years Are Passing By" — Grave Digger

Scene 2: The Royal Exchange

- "Jolly, Rich and Fat" — Three Charity Men, Smythe Family, Businessmen, Wives and Children
- "Nothing To Do With Me" — Scrooge and Cratchit

Scene 3: The Street

- "Street Song (Nothing To Do With Me)" — People of London, Scrooge, Fred, Jonathon, Sandwich Board Man, Lamplighter, Blind Hag and Jack Smythe

Scene 4: Scrooge's House

- "Link By Link" — Marley's Ghost, Scrooge and Ghosts

Scene 5: Scrooge's Bed Chamber

- "The Lights of Long Ago" – Ghost of Christmas Past

Scene 6: The Law Courts

- "God Bless Us, Everyone" – Scrooge's Mother, Fan at 6 and Scrooge at 8

Scene 7: The Factory

- "A Place Called Home" – Scrooge at 12, Fan at 10 and Scrooge

Scene 8: Fezziwig's Banking House

- "Mr. Fezziwig's Annual Christmas Ball" — Fezziwig, Mrs. Fezziwig and Guests
- "A Place Called Home (Reprise)" — Emily, Scrooge at 18 and Scrooge

Scene 9: Montage

- "The Lights of Long Ago (Part II)" — Scrooge at 18, Young Marley, Emily and People from Scrooge's Past

Scene 10: A Starry Night

- "Abundance and Charity" – Ghost of Christmas Present, Scrooge and The Christmas Gifts

Scene 11: All Over London

- "Christmas Together" – Tiny Tim, The Cratchit's Fred, Sally, Scrooge and People of London

Scene 12: The Graveyard

- "Dancing On Your Grave" – Grave Diggers, Ghost of Christmas Future, Monks, Businessmen, Mrs. Mops, Undertakers, Old Joe, Mr. Smythe and Cratchit
- "Yesterday, Tomorrow and Today" – Scrooge, Angels and Children of London

Scene 13: Scrooge's Bed Chamber

- "The Years Are Passing By (Reprise)" – Jonathon

Scene 14: The Street, Christmas Day

- "Nothing To Do With Me (Reprise)" – Scrooge
- "Christmas Together (Reprise)" – The People of London
- "God Bless Us, Everyone (Finale)" – The Company

=== Final version ===
Time: London, 1880

- "Overture" — Orchestra

Scene 1: The Royal Exchange

- "A Jolly Good Time" — Charity Men, Smythe Family, Businessmen, Wives and Children
- "Nothing To Do With Me" — Scrooge and Cratchit

Scene 2: The Street

- "You Mean More to Me" – Cratchit and Tiny Tim
- "Street Song (Nothing To Do With Me)" — People of London, Scrooge, Fred, Jonathon, Sandwichboard Man, Lamplighter, Blind Hag and Grace Smythe

Scene 3: Scrooge's House

- "Link By Link" — Marley's Ghost, Scrooge and Ghosts

Scene 4: Scrooge's Bed Chamber

- "The Lights of Long Ago" – Ghost of Christmas Past

Scene 5: The Law Courts

- "God Bless Us, Everyone" – Scrooge's Mother

Scene 6: The Factory

- "A Place Called Home" – Scrooge at 12, Fan and Scrooge

Scene 7: Fezziwig's Banking House

- "Fezziwig's Annual Christmas Ball" — Fezziwig, Mrs. Fezziwig and Guests
- "A Place Called Home (Reprise)" — Emily, Scrooge at 18 and Scrooge

Scene 8: Scrooge and Marley's

- "The Lights of Long Ago (Part II)" — Scrooge at 18, Young Marley, Emily, People from Scrooge's Past and Ghost of Christmas Past

Scene 9: A Starry Night

- "Abundance and Charity" – Ghost of Christmas Present, Scrooge and The Christmas Gifts

Scene 10: All Over London

- "Christmas Together" – Tiny Tim, The Cratchit's, Ghost of Christmas Present, Fred, Sally, Scrooge and People of London

Scene 11: The Graveyard

- "Dancing On Your Grave" – Ghost of Christmas Yet-To-Be, Scrooge, Monks, Businessmen, Mrs. Mops, Undertakers, Old Joe and Cratchit
- "Yesterday, Tomorrow and Today" – Scrooge and Angels

Scene 12: Scrooge's Bed Chamber

- "London Town Carol" – Jonathon

Scene 13: The Street, Christmas Day

- "Nothing To Do With Me (Reprise)" – Scrooge
- "Christmas Together (Reprise)" – The People of London
- "God Bless Us, Everyone (Finale)" – The Company

== Instrumentation ==
The orchestration for A Christmas Carol consists of five woodwinds, one French horn, three trumpets in B♭ (one doubling on flugelhorn), two trombones (the second doubling tuba), a drum kit, a percussion section, two synthesizers, one harp (doubling synthesizer) and strings. The first woodwind player doubles on flute, piccolo, clarinet in B♭ and soprano saxophone, the second on oboe, English horn, clarinet in B♭ and tenor saxophone, the third on clarinets in E♭ and B♭, flute, piccolo, tin whistle and alto saxophone, the fourth bass clarinet in B♭, flute and clarinet in B♭, and the fifth on bassoon, clarinet in B♭, flute and bass saxophone.

== Reception ==
David Richards reviewed the 1994 production for The New York Times writing:

"Christmas Together," the joyful production number that comes two thirds of the way through, offers nothing less than a panoramic view of the city in full celebration. Stage left, you have Tiny Tim and the Cratchits; stage right, Scrooge's nephew Fred and his family. Meanwhile, the sorts of windows you find in Advent calendars are being thrown open everywhere. Behind some, actors are singing; behind others, cardboard cutouts are dancing. At "The Phantom of the Opera" or "Miss Saigon," you tend to look up a lot. At "A Christmas Carol," you look around.

Of the score, Richards wrote: "After the spectacle, the score by Mr. Menken (with lyrics by Ms. Ahrens) is the production's major drawing card." Richards continued, "The eye is courted at every turn, the special effects come on a regular basis and the street scenes don't lack for warmly dressed bodies and the odd beggar. At the end, snow falls in the hall as well as onstage, which so thrilled an incredulous 8-year-old boy seated near me that he got up and danced in the aisle."

Lawrence Van Gelder reviewed the 2002 production for The New York Times writing, "Music, dance, colorful costumes and atmospheric scenery – all intended to make holiday theatergoing a pleasant family experience – are marshaled here to satisfying effect." Of F. Murray Abraham's performance, Gelder wrote: "Far from the terrifying figure who made blind men's dogs tug their owners into doorways and up courts, Mr. Abraham can scarcely contain the good cheer waiting to burst out in little bits of business before his ghostly encounters."

Jeremy Gerard reviewed the 1994 production for "Variety" writing, "The show begins with a thunderous percussive explosion — rumbling organ, crashing cymbals, blaring brass — on Tony Walton's wraparound London cityscape set that's so big you could park Norma Desmond's mansion in there and never notice it." Gerard continues:

Spectacle is the operative word here. It is done fluidly and — an Ockrent/Stroman trademark — with considerable humor, especially in the first big dance number, "Link by Link," in which a very animated Ghost of Jacob Marley (Jeff Keller) and a platoon of ectoplasmic accomplices outline for Scrooge (Walter Charles) the many ways in which his life has gone wrong. With all its clanging clamor, the scene giddily recalls darker moments from both "Kiss of the Spider Woman" and "Grand Hotel."

Noting the costume design, Gerard said: "For a later dance number, a Christmas ball stunningly set in Fezziwig's Banking House, costume designer William Ivey Long (another "Crazy" alum) has outdone himself, which is saying something, as gown after wildly colorful gown makes its entrance and has its spin.

== See also ==
- Adaptations of A Christmas Carol
- A Christmas Carol
