= Jeff Kready =

American actor

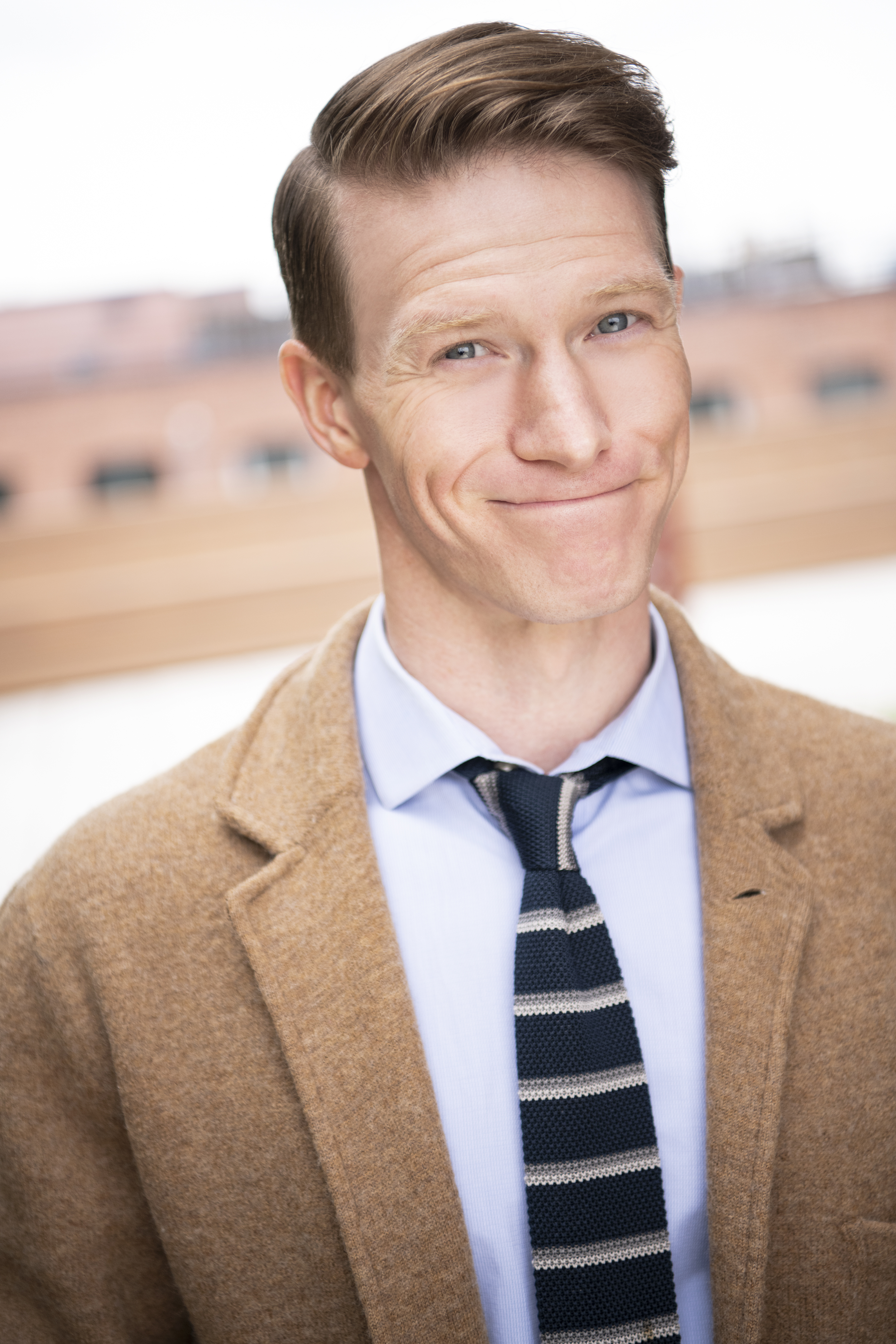
- Kready in 2021
- Born: Parsons, Kansas
- Education: Washburn University (B.A.)
- Occupation: Actor
- Years active: 2006-present
- Spouse: Nikki Renée Daniels
- Children: 2
- Website: jeffkready.com

Jeff Kready (born in Parsons, Kansas, United States) is an American stage performer and has been featured in Broadway musicals.

== Early life ==
Raised in Topeka, Kansas, Kready is a 2000 graduate of Washburn Rural High School. In 2004, he earned a Bachelor of Arts degree in Voice Performance and Vocal Music Education from Washburn University.

== Career ==
Kready made his Broadway debut in the 2006 revival of Les Misérables in the role of Babet/Fauchelevent and an understudy Jean Valjean. He had the distinction of being the youngest actor to portray the role of Valjean on Broadway until 2015, when Kyle Jean-Baptiste performed the role at 21. The show opened 9 November 2006 at the Broadhurst Theatre and closed on 6 January 2008. His next appearance on Broadway was in the Roundabout Theater Company 2008 Broadway Revival of Sunday in the Park with George as an understudy.

Kready was in the original Broadway company of Billy Elliot The Musical as a member of the ensemble. The production opened at the Imperial Theatre on November 13, 2008. While Will Chase was on hiatus from May to August 2010, Kready took over the role of Tony. Kready then left the show to originate the role of Tony on the second National Tour beginning November 2010.

In 2014, Kready took over the lead role of Monty Navarro from Bryce Pinkham in A Gentleman's Guide to Love and Murder. He had been a member of the original Broadway company since November 2013 as a member of the ensemble and understudied several roles.

Kready was the standby for the leading role of Michael Dorsey in the 2019 Broadway musical comedy Tootsie, which opened at the Marquis Theatre on April 23, 2019.

Kready was featured as Bert Healey in Annie Live!, a musical television special that aired on NBC on December 2, 2021.

Off-Broadway, Kready starred in the World Premiere of Tokio Confidential for the Atlantic Theater Company in the role of Ernest alongside of Jill Paice (Isabella). Other notable performances include the World Premiere of In This House (Two River Theater Company) in Red Bank, New Jersey.

Kready starred in the 2012 production of the Rodgers and Hammerstein classic Carousel in the role of Enoch Snow opposite Jenn Gambatese (Carrie), for which he received a Connecticut Critics Circle Nomination for Outstanding Supporting Actor in a Musical. He also led David Sedaris' one-man-show The Santaland Diaries at Hartford's Theaterworks, and Thoroughly Modern Millie in the role of Jimmy, co-produced by the Maltz Jupiter Theater in Jupiter, Florida and Paper Mill Playhouse in Millburn, New Jersey. Jeff also starred in Paper Mill Playhouse production of Holiday Inn in the role of Ted Hanover, and Pittsburgh Civic Light Opera's production of Brigadoon in the role of Tommy Albright.

Kready was in the ensemble of the third Broadway revival of Company. He filled in for Christopher Fitzgerald in the role of David for an extended run. He also was in the ensemble of the New York City Center 2023 revival of Oliver!. Later that year, he starred as Sky Masterson in Guys and Dolls at the Benedum Center. He played opposite renowned Broadway actress Nikki Renée Daniels, who played Sarah Brown. The couple are married in real life.

In May 2024, he joined the cast of The Great Gatsby on Broadway and understudied Jeremy Jordan in the title role. In November 2024, he was featured as Henry Ford in the acclaimed City Center revival of Ragtime. In 2025, he was cast in the Off-Broadway immersive revival of The Phantom of the Opera at 218 West 57th Street as The Phantom, a role he played until early 2026. In February 2026, he was announced to be taking over the role of Hester Leggatt & Others in the Broadway production of Operation Mincemeat from original cast member Jak Malone.

In addition to Kready's stage credits, he guest starred in season 3, episode 6 of the Emmy-nominated HBO series Boardwalk Empire. Other television credits include a recurring co-star role in the CBS crime drama Elementary, The Good Fight CBS web television series, and in the CBS drama The Code.

Kready performed voiceover work in the UMPQUA Bank television commercial campaign. He also sang on Nikki Renée Daniels' debut album, Home. Kready is a vocalist in the South Park 25th Season orchestra trailers.

== Theatre credits ==
Ref:

Year	Production	Role	Category
2006-2008	Les Misérables	Fauchelevent / Babet / Ensemble u/s Jean Valjean	Broadhurst Theatre, Broadway
2008	Sunday in the Park with George	u/s Soldier / Alex u/s Louis / Billy Webster u/s Franz / Lee Randolph	Studio 54, Broadway
2008-2010	Billy Elliot: The Musical	Ensemble u/s Tony	Imperial Theatre, Broadway
2010	Billy Elliot: The Musical	Tony	Imperial Theatre, Broadway
2010-2011	Billy Elliot: The Musical	Tony	US National Tour
2012	Tokio Confidential	Ernest	Atlantic Theater Company, Off-Broadway
2012	Carousel	Enoch Snow	Goodspeed Musicals
2013	Thoroughly Modern Millie	Jimmy Smith	Maltz Jupiter Theatre / Paper Mill Playhouse
2013-2015	A Gentleman's Guide to Love and Murder	Farmer / Guard u/s Montague D'Ysquith Navarro	Walter Kerr Theatre, Broadway
2015	A Gentleman's Guide to Love and Murder	Montague D'Ysquith Navarro	Walter Kerr Theatre, Broadway
2017	Attack of the Elvis Impersonators	Reverend Jeremiah Stonewall	Theatre Row Building, Off-Broadway
2018	Brigadoon	Tommy Albright	Benedum Center
2018	Tootsie	Michael Dorsey / Dorothy Michaels (standby)	Cadillac Palace Theatre
2018	Holiday Inn	Ted Hanover	Paper Mill Playhouse
2019-2020	Tootsie	Michael Dorsey / Dorothy Michaels (standby)	Marquis Theatre, Broadway
2022	Company	u/s Jamie, u/s Paul, u/s David, u/s Andy, u/s Harry, u/s Peter, u/s Theo	Bernard B. Jacobs Theatre, Broadway
2022	Company	David	Bernard B. Jacobs Theatre, Broadway
2023	Oliver!	Ensemble	New York City Center, Off-Broadway
2023	Guys and Dolls	Sky Masterson	Benedum Center
2024	The Great Gatsby	Ensemble u/s Jay Gatsby u/s Tom Buchanan	Broadway Theatre, Broadway
2024	Ragtime	Henry Ford / Ensemble	New York City Center, Off-Broadway
2025-2026	The Phantom of the Opera	The Phantom	218 West 57th Street, Off-Broadway
2026-	Operation Mincemeat	Hester Leggatt & Others	John Golden Theatre, Broadway
