= Sam Buntrock =

English stage director (born 1975)

Sam Buntrock (born 19 September 1975) is an English stage director.

== Career ==
Buntrock studied Drama at University of Bristol.

Buntrock directed the first West End revival of the musical Sunday in the Park with George. The production ran at the Menier Chocolate Factory in London, England, from 18 November 2005 - 12 March 2006, before transferring to the West End's Wyndham's Theatre, running 23 May 2006 - 2 September 2006. Buntrock received critical acclaim, and an Olivier Award nomination for this production. He made his Broadway debut directing the first revival of the show, for which he received Tony Award and Drama Desk Award nominations. The production ran at Studio 54, from 21 February - 29 June 2008. The production made its West Coast debut in 2009 at 5th Avenue Theatre in Seattle, Washington.

Other directing credits include the London revival of Assassins, Daniel Goldfarb's Cradle and All Off-Broadway at Manhattan Theatre Club, which opened in May 2011, Lenny Henry's Cradle to Grave (UK tour), Take Flight at the Menier Chocolate Factory (2007) and McCarter Theater, Marcus Brigstocke's God Collar (Edinburgh, UK Tour and West End), the European tour of The Rocky Horror Show and Marcus Brigstocke's one-man shows Get a Life and Help Yourself (both in Edinburgh and UK tour). As resident assistant director at the Donmar Warehouse, he worked on productions of Juno and the Paycock, Three Days of Rain, Helpless and The Real Thing (which subsequently transferred to the West End and Broadway). He directed the first London revival of Assassins in 1997 at the New End Theatre in Hampstead.

As part of the British comedy team Club Seals, Buntrock created the animation for "The Award-Winning Show," "Live Ghost Hunt," "DJ Danny," "Sins of the Grandfathers," "The Museum of Everything" and "We Are History" for BBC2. He has worked as an animation director on numerous commercial and corporate projects, most recently the television film Stuart: A Life Backwards (2007) for Neal Street Productions, HBO and the BBC.

Other projects include the world premiere of Rob Handel's "A Maze" (New York Stage and Film's Powerhouse Theater season), Much Ado About Nothing at Two River Theater (September 2011), Tom Stoppard's Travesties and the world premiere of John Guare's "Are You There, McPhee?" (May 2012) both at McCarter Theater. He directed the Benjamin Britten opera The Turn of the Screw at the Brooklyn Academy of Music in February 2013. He directed the new play Sleeping Rough by Kara Manning Off-Broadway by Page 73 Productions in April 2013. He directed the new musical The A to Z of Mrs P at the Southwark Playhouse, starring Isy Suttie and Frances Ruffelle in 2014.

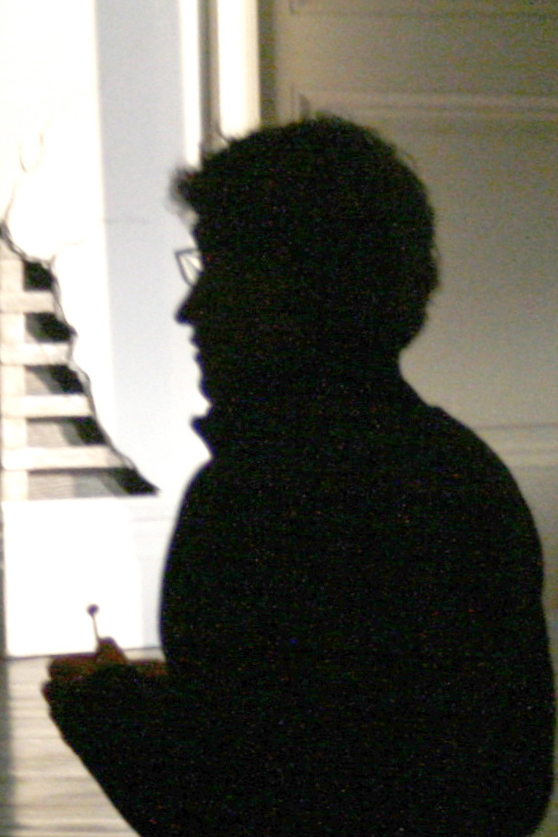
Sam Buntrock
