= Idiot's Delight (play) =

1936 play written by Robert E. Sherwood

- Written by: Robert E. Sherwood
- Original language: English
- Genre: Comedy
- Setting: cocktail lounge in Hotel Monte Gabrielle in Italian Alps

Premiere
- Date premiered: March 24, 1936
- Place premiered: Shubert Theatre; New York City, New York

Idiot's Delight is a 1936 Pulitzer-Prize-winning play written by American playwright Robert E. Sherwood and presented by the Theatre Guild. The play takes place in the Hotel Monte Gabriel in the Italian Alps during 24 hours at the beginning of a world war. The guests trapped in the hotel by the sudden onset of hostilities are from Germany, France, the United States and Britain. Directed by Bretaigne Windust, the cast starred Alfred Lunt (Harry Van) and Lynn Fontanne (Irene), with Sydney Greenstreet as Dr. Waldersee and Francis Compton as Achille Weber. The play was the runner-up for the 1936 New York Drama Critics' Circle Award for Best American Play.

== Productions ==
Idiot's Delight had a pre-Broadway tryout at the National Theatre, Washington, D.C., starting on March 9, 1936. It premiered on Broadway at the Shubert Theatre, running from March 24, 1936 to July 4, 1936 and from August 31, 1936 to January 30, 1937, for 300 performances.

The play won the 1936 Pulitzer Prize for Drama, the first of four Pulitzers (three for Drama, one for Biography) that Sherwood received. The Pulitzer jury wrote: "We are absolutely in complete agreement in recommending 'Idiot's delight' ...It is a first-rate play, full of dramatic invention, and one or two of the comedy scenes have a Molierian richness."

Sherwood adapted the play into a 1939 film of the same name, starring Norma Shearer and Clark Gable.

The New York City Theatre Company presented a revival at the New York City Center from May 23, 1951 to June 3, 1951. Directed by George Schaefer, the cast featured Lee Tracy and Ruth Chatterton.

In 1983, Alan Jay Lerner and Charles Strouse adapted the play into the musical, Dance a Little Closer, which ran one performance on Broadway.

The play was produced at the Kennedy Center, Eisenhower Theater in Washington, D.C., in March 1986, directed by Peter Sellars.

== Plot ==
The play takes place in the Hotel Monte Gabriel in the Italian Alps during 24 hours at the beginning of a world war. The guests trapped in the hotel by the sudden onset of hostilities are from Germany, France and the United States, including a British couple on their honeymoon.

=== Characters ===
- Harry Van, American, the manager of a group of strippers and dancers
- Irene, the glamorous mistress of a Nazi arms dealer
- Achille Weber, the arms dealer
- the Cherrys, British honeymooners
- Dr. Waldersee, a German doctor
- Quillery, a French pacifist
- Captain Locicero, the commander of the Italian headquarters located next to the hotel

== Reception ==
Brooks Atkinson reviewed the play for The New York Times on March 25, 1936: "Mr. Sherwood's love of a good time and his anxiety about world affairs result in one of his most likable entertainments…Already it is widely known as the show in which Alfred Lunt plays the part of a third-rate hoofer and Lynn Fontanne wears an exotic blonde wig. That is true, and it demonstrates Mr. Sherwood's taste for exuberance and jovial skulduggery. Having fought in the last war and having a good mind and memory, Mr. Sherwood is also acutely aware of the dangers of a relapse into bloodshed throughout the world today. His leg show and frivolity in Idiot's Delight is played against the background of cannon calamity, and it concludes with a detonation of airplane bombs. at the final curtain, Mr. Sherwood shoots the works…. What you will probably enjoy more than his argument is the genial humor of his dialogue, his romantic flair for character and his relish of the incongruous and the ridiculous".

== See also ==
- List of plays with anti-war themes
