= Sunday in the Park with George =

1984 musical by Stephen Sondheim and James Lapine

- Original Broadway Playbill cover
- Music: Stephen Sondheim
- Lyrics: Stephen Sondheim
- Book: James Lapine
- Setting: Paris, France, 1884–1885; 1984
- Basis: A Sunday Afternoon on the Island of La Grande Jatte by Georges Seurat
- Premiere: July 6, 1983: Playwrights Horizons, New York City
- Productions: 1983 Off-Broadway; 1984 Broadway; 1990 London; 1994 Broadway concert; 2005 Off-West End; 2006 West End; 2008 Broadway revival; 2016 New York City Center; 2017 Broadway revival
- Awards: 1984 Drama Desk Outstanding Musical; 1984 Drama Desk Outstanding Book; 1984 Drama Desk Outstanding Lyrics; 1985 Pulitzer Prize for Drama; 1991 Laurence Olivier Award for Best New Musical; 2007 Olivier Outstanding Musical

Sunday in the Park with George is a 1984 musical with music and lyrics by Stephen Sondheim and book by James Lapine. It was inspired by the French pointillist painter Georges Seurat's painting A Sunday Afternoon on the Island of La Grande Jatte (painted 1884–1886). The plot revolves around George, a fictionalized version of Seurat, who immerses himself deeply in painting his masterpiece, and his great-grandson (also named George), a conflicted and cynical contemporary artist. The Broadway production opened in 1984.

The musical won the 1985 Pulitzer Prize for Drama, two Tony Awards for design (and a nomination for Best Musical), numerous Drama Desk Awards, the 1991 Olivier Award for Best Musical, and the 2007 Olivier Award for Outstanding Musical Production. It has enjoyed several major revivals, including the 2005–2006 UK production first presented at the Menier Chocolate Factory, its subsequent 2008 Broadway transfer, and a 2017 Broadway revival.

== Synopsis ==
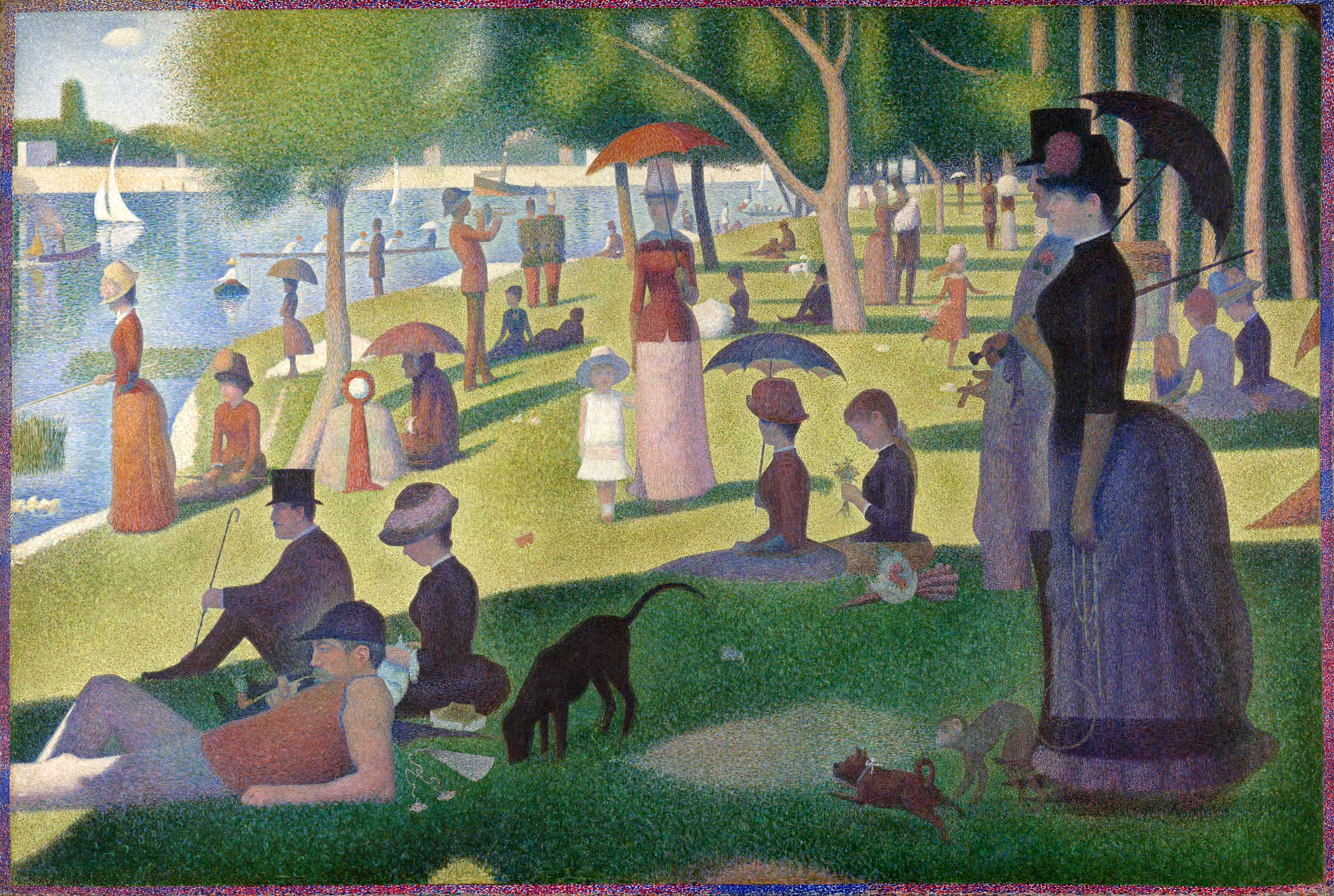
A Sunday Afternoon on the Island of La Grande Jatte

=== Act I ===
In 1884, Georges Seurat, known as George in the musical, is sketching studies for his painting A Sunday Afternoon on the Island of La Grande Jatte. He announces to the audience, "White, a blank page or canvas. The challenge: bring order to the whole, through design, composition, tension, balance, light and harmony." He conjures up the painting's setting, a small suburban park on an island, and retains some control of his surroundings as he draws them. His longtime mistress, Dot, models for him, despite her frustration at having to get up early on a Sunday ("Sunday in the Park with George").

More park regulars begin to arrive: a quarrelsome Old Lady and her Nurse discuss how Paris is changing to accommodate a tower for the International Exposition, but the Nurse is more interested in a German coachman, Franz. The quiet of the park is interrupted by a group of rude bathers. George freezes them with a gesture, making them the subjects of his first painting, Bathers at Asnières.

The setting abruptly changes to a gallery where the painting is on display. Jules (a more successful artist friend of George's) and his wife Yvonne think George's work has "No Life". Back on the island, Jules and Yvonne have a short discussion with George and depart. They take their coachman Franz with them, interrupting his rendezvous with the Nurse. Dot, who has grown tired of standing still in the early morning sunlight, leaves the park mollified after George promises to take her to the Follies. George approaches the Old Lady, revealed to be his mother, and asks to draw her, but she bluntly refuses.

In his studio, George works on his painting obsessively while Dot prepares for their date and fantasizes about being a Follies girl ("Color and Light"). When George briefly stops painting to clean his brushes, he and Dot reflect on how fascinated they are by each other. Dot is ready to leave, but George chooses to continue painting instead, greatly upsetting her.

In the park on a Sunday some time later, George sketches a disgruntled Boatman to the disapproval of an observing Jules. Dot enters on the arm of Louis, a baker. Two chatting shopgirls, both named Celeste, notice Dot with a new man ("Gossip"). When Jules and Yvonne's daughter Louise attempts to pet the Boatman's dog, he shouts at her, then lashes out at George and storms off. George and Dot have a strained conversation as she works on the grammar book she is using to teach herself how to read and write.

As Jules and Yvonne mock the unconventional nature of George's art, they discuss an initiative to have his work included in the next group show, which they both protest. George sketches two dogs while whimsically trying to imagine the world from their perspective, describing their relief to be free of their routines on Sunday ("The Dog Song").

As the day goes on, George quietly sketches denizens of the park ("The Day Off"): The two Celestes try to attract the attention of a pair of Soldiers, fighting over which will get the more handsome of the two; the Nurse hides from the Old Lady and attempts to attract Franz's attention; Franz and his wife Frieda argue with Louise and each other; a pair of wealthy American tourists pass by, hating everything about Paris but the pastries, and plan to return home with a baker in tow; Jules returns to further lecture George on his shortcomings as an artist, receiving in response an invitation to see his new painting; the Boatman reappears to rebuke the artists' condescending attitude.

Dot sees George, but he slips away before she can speak to him, and in retaliation, she describes her satisfying new life with Louis. She clearly misses and loves George, but Louis loves, respects and needs her in a way George cannot, and she has made her choice ("Everybody Loves Louis").

As the park empties for the evening, George returns. He misses Dot and laments that his art has alienated him from those important to him, but resigns himself to the likelihood that creative fulfillment may always take precedence for him over personal happiness ("Finishing the Hat").

Time has passed, and a heavily pregnant Dot visits George's studio. She asks for a painting George made of her, but he refuses. Jules and Yvonne come to the studio to see George's nearly finished painting. While Jules goes with George to see the painting, Yvonne and Dot hold a wary conversation. They realize they have both felt neglected by an artist, their mutual dislike fades, and they discuss the difficulties of trying to maintain a romantic relationship with an artist.

Meanwhile, Jules is puzzled by George's new technique and concerned that his obsession with his work is alienating him from his fellow artists and collectors alike. He refuses to support the work. Jules and Yvonne leave, and George, having forgotten Dot was there, goes back to work. Dot reveals the real reason for her visit: Despite the obvious fact that George fathered her unborn child, she and Louis are getting married and leaving for America. George angrily retreats behind his canvas, and she begs him to react in some way to her news. They argue bitterly about their failed relationship, and Dot concludes sadly that while George may be capable of self-fulfillment, she is not, and they must part ("We Do Not Belong Together").

In the park, the Old Lady finally agrees to sit for George, losing herself in fond memories of his childhood that George repeatedly disputes. She bemoans Paris's changing skyline, and he encourages her to see the beauty in the world as it is, rather than how it had been ("Beautiful"). The American Tourists arrive with Louis and Dot, who holds her newborn daughter, Marie. George refuses to acknowledge her as his child, and says that Louis will be able to care for her in a way that he cannot before offering a feeble apology as Dot sadly departs.

The park grows noisy: the Celestes and the Soldier argue over their respective breakups while Jules and Frieda sneak away to have a tryst. Louise informs Yvonne of her father's infidelity and a fight breaks out among Jules, Yvonne, Franz, and Frieda. The Celestes and the Soldier squabble noisily, and soon all the park-goers are fighting until the Old Lady shouts, "Remember, George!", and he stops them all with a gesture. George takes control of the subjects of his painting, who sing in harmony, transforming them into the final tableau of his finished painting ("Sunday").

=== Act II ===
As the curtain opens the characters, still in the tableau, complain about being stuck in the painting ("It's Hot Up Here"). The characters deliver short eulogies for George, who died suddenly at 31. The stage transforms back to a blank, white canvas.

The action fast-forwards a century to 1984. George and Dot's great-grandson, also an artist named George, is at a museum unveiling his latest work, a reflection on Seurat's painting in the form of a light machine called "Chromolume #7." George presents the work, grounding its connection to the painting by inviting his 98-year-old grandmother, Marie, to help him present the work. Marie shares her family history, describing how her mother, Dot, informed her on her deathbed that she was Seurat's daughter. George is skeptical of that bit of family lore, but Marie insists that the notes in Dot's grammar book, which mention George, are proof. After a brief technical failure, the Chromolume is unveiled.

At the reception, various patrons and curators congratulate George on his work while George flits among them, commenting on the difficulties of producing modern art ("Putting It Together"). Like his great-grandfather, he conjures his surroundings, allowing himself to hold multiple conversations at once. The only voice he finds he cannot ignore is that of an art critic who advises him that he is repeating himself and wasting his gifts. After the museum's patrons have left for dinner, Marie speaks to her mother's image in the painting, worrying about George. When he arrives to take her home, she tells him about her mother, attempting to pass on a message about the legacy we leave behind ("Children and Art"). She dozes off and George, alone with the painting, realizes he is lacking connection.

Weeks later, Marie has died and George has been invited by the French government to do a presentation of the Chromolume on the island the painting depicts. There George reveals to his friend Dennis that he has turned down his next commission. Feeling adrift and unsure, George reads from a book he inherited from his grandmother—the same one Dot used to learn to read—and ponders the similarities between himself and his great-grandfather ("Lesson #8").

A vision of Dot appears and greets George, whom she addresses as if he were the George she knew. He confides his doubts to her and she tells him to stop worrying about whether his choices are right and simply make them ("Move On"). George finds some words written in the back of the book—the words George often muttered while he worked. As George reads them aloud the characters from the painting fill the stage and recreate their tableau ("Sunday"). As they leave and the stage resembles a blank canvas, George reads: "White: a blank page or canvas. His favorite—so many possibilities."

== History ==
After the failure and scathing critical reception of Merrily We Roll Along in 1981, which closed after 16 performances, Sondheim announced his intention to quit musical theatre. Lapine persuaded him to return to the theatrical world after the two were inspired by A Sunday Afternoon on the Island of La Grande Jatte. They spent several days at the Art Institute of Chicago studying the painting. Lapine noted that one major figure was missing from the canvas: the artist himself. This observation provided the springboard for Sunday and the production evolved into a meditation on art, emotional connection and community.

The musical fictionalizes Seurat's life. Neither of his children survived beyond infancy, so he had no heirs. Seurat's common-law wife was Madeleine Knobloch, who gave birth to his two sons, one after his death. Unlike Dot, Knobloch was living with Seurat when he died, and did not emigrate to America. She died of cirrhosis of the liver at the age of 35. Seurat's masterpiece, the backdrop of the play, hangs in the Art Institute of Chicago.

== Productions ==
=== Original Off-Broadway production ===
The show opened Off-Broadway at Playwrights Horizons, starring Mandy Patinkin and Bernadette Peters, in July 1983, and ran for 25 performances. Only the first act was performed, which was still in development. The first act was fleshed out and work began on the second during that time; the complete two-act show premiered during the last three performances. After seeing the show at Playwrights, composer Leonard Bernstein wrote to his friend Sondheim, calling the show "brilliant, deeply conceived, canny, magisterial and by far the most personal statement I've heard from you thus far. Bravo." Three performers in the off-Broadway production did not move with it to Broadway: Kelsey Grammer, who played a Soldier/Young Man on the Bank/Alex; Mary Elizabeth Mastrantonio, who played Celeste #2/Linda Cash; and Christine Baranski, who played Blair Daniels/Clarisse (Clarisse was later renamed Yvonne).

=== Original Broadway production ===
The musical began previews on April 2, 1984 at the Booth Theatre on Broadway and officially opened on May 2, 1984. The second act was finalized and the show was "frozen" only a few days before the opening.

Lapine directed and Patinkin and Peters starred, with scenic design by Tony Straiges, costume design by Patricia Zipprodt and Ann Hould-Ward, lighting by Richard Nelson, and special effects by Bran Ferren. In his New York Times review of Sunday in the Park with George Frank Rich wrote, "What Mr. Lapine, his designers and the special-effects wizard Bran Ferren have arranged is simply gorgeous." It was the first Broadway show to utilize projection mapping (onto the spherical surface topping the Chromolume #7 sculpture), and high powered lasers that broke the 4th wall, traveling throughout the audience.

Sunday opened on Broadway to mixed critical responses. The New York Times theatre critic Frank Rich wrote: "I do know... that Mr. Sondheim and Mr. Lapine have created an audacious, haunting and, in its own intensely personal way, touching work. Even when it fails—as it does on occasion—Sunday in the Park is setting the stage for even more sustained theatrical innovations yet to come." The musical enjoyed a healthy box office, though it ultimately lost money; it closed on October 13, 1985, after 604 performances and 35 previews. Notable replacements in the cast over the course of the run include Robert Westenberg, Cris Groenendaal and Harry Groener all taking over the title roles and Betsy Joslyn and Maryann Plunkett taking over the roles of Dot and Marie.

Although it was considered a brilliant artistic achievement for Sondheim and nominated for ten Tony Awards, the show won only two, both for design. (The major winner of the night was Jerry Herman's La Cage aux Folles. In his acceptance speech Herman noted that the "simple, hummable tune" was still alive on Broadway, a remark some perceived as criticism of Sondheim's pointillistic score. Herman later denied that that had been his intention.) Sunday won the New York Drama Critics Circle Award for Outstanding Musical and Sondheim and Lapine were awarded the Pulitzer Prize for Drama. Sunday is one of only ten musicals to win a Pulitzer.

On May 15, 1994, the original cast of Sunday in the Park with George returned to Broadway for a tenth anniversary concert, which was also a benefit for "Friends in Deed". The only members of the original cast who weren’t in attendance were Robert Westenberg, Cris Groenendaal and Brent Spiner, who were filled in for by Howard McGillin, Jeff Keller and Bruce Adler, respectively.

=== Original London production ===
The first London production opened at the Royal National Theatre on March 15, 1990, and ran for 117 performances, with Philip Quast as George and Maria Friedman as Dot. The production was nominated for six Laurence Olivier Awards, beating Into the Woods, another collaboration between Lapine and Sondheim, to win Best New Musical (1991). Quast won the award for Best Actor in a Musical.

=== 2005 London revival ===
The show's first revival was presented at the Menier Chocolate Factory in London, opening on November 14, 2005, and closing on March 17, 2006. The production starred Daniel Evans and Anna-Jane Casey, with direction by Sam Buntrock, set and costume design by David Farley, projection design by Timothy Bird, musical direction by Caroline Humphris, and new orchestrations by Jason Carr. The production transferred to the Wyndham's Theatre in London's West End, opening on May 23, 2006, and closing on September 2, 2006. Jenna Russell replaced the unavailable Casey. The revival received six Olivier Award nominations overall, and won five in total including Outstanding Musical Production, Best Actor in a Musical and Best Actress in a Musical.

=== 2008 Broadway revival ===
The 2005 London production transferred to Broadway in 2008, where it was produced by Roundabout Theatre Company and Studio 54. As a limited engagement, previews started on January 25, 2008, with an opening on February 21, 2008, running through June 29 (reflecting three extensions).

Daniel Evans and Jenna Russell (who starred in the 2005-6 London production) reprised their roles with Sam Buntrock directing, musical staging by Christopher Gattelli, set and costume design by David Farley, projection design by Timothy Bird and the Knifedge Creative Network, lighting design by Ken Billington, music supervision by Caroline Humphris, orchestrations by Jason Carr and sound design by Sebastian Frost. The cast included Michael Cumpsty (Jules/Bob), Jessica Molaskey (Yvonne/Naomi), Ed Dixon (Mr./Charles Redmond), Mary Beth Peil (Old Lady/Blair), Alexander Gemignani (Boatman/Dennis), and David Turner (Franz/Lee Randolph).

Reviewers praised the script and score as well as the innovative design and the entire cast. Ben Brantley wrote in The New York Times, "The great gift of this production, first staged in London two years ago, is its quiet insistence that looking is the art by which all people shape their lives....a familiar show shimmers with a new humanity and clarity that make theatergoers see it with virgin eyes. And while Sunday remains a lopsided piece—pairing a near-perfect, self-contained first act with a lumpier, less assured second half—this production goes further than any I’ve seen in justifying the second act’s existence." As described in The New York Times, "In [Buntrock's] intimate production, live actors talk to projections, scenery darkens as day turns into night, and animation seamlessly blends into the background...In this new version, thanks to 3-D animation, the painting, currently the crown jewel of the Art Institute of Chicago, slowly comes together onstage. A sketch emerges, then color is added, and the rest gradually comes into focus, piece by piece."

The Broadway production received five Outer Critics Circle Award nominations, three Drama League Award nominations and seven Drama Desk Award nominations including Outstanding Revival of a Musical, Outstanding Actor and Actress in a Musical and Outstanding Director of a Musical. Russell and Evans also received Tony Award nominations for their performances.

=== 2017 Broadway revival ===
The show was performed in a four-performance concert version as part of New York City Center's 2016 Gala on October 24–26, 2016. Jake Gyllenhaal starred as George opposite Annaleigh Ashford as Dot/Marie.

Based on the concert's reception, a limited-run revival was presented on Broadway at the Hudson Theatre. Previews began on February 11, 2017, and the production opened on February 23 to glowing reviews. In addition to Gyllenhaal and Ashford, it featured Brooks Ashmanskas (Mr./Charles), Phillip Boykin (Boatman/Lee), Claybourne Elder (Soldier/Alex), Liz McCartney (Mrs./Harriet), Ruthie Ann Miles (Frieda/Betty), David Turner (Franz/Dennis), Jordan Gelber (Louis/Billy), Erin Davie (Yvonne/Naomi), Penny Fuller (Old Lady/Blair), and Robert Sean Leonard (Jules/Bob). The production team included James Lapine's niece Sarna Lapine (director), Ann Yee (musical staging), Beowulf Boritt (scenic design), Clint Ramos (costume design), and Ken Billington (lighting design). The producers withdrew the production from Tony Award consideration for the 2016–17 season due to its limited run, which closed on April 23.

=== Other productions ===
As part of the Kennedy Center Sondheim Celebration, the musical was presented in the Eisenhower Theatre from May 31, 2002, to June 28, 2002. Directed by Eric D. Schaeffer, the cast featured Raúl Esparza in the titular roles, Melissa Errico as Dot/Marie, and original Broadway cast member Cris Groenendaal as Jules/Bob Greenberg. The Chicago Shakespeare Theater presented the musical in 2002, directed by Gary Griffin in the intimate, 200-seat Upstairs Theater. In September 2012, Griffin returned to direct the play in the larger downstairs Courtyard Theater. The production starred Jason Danieley as George and Carmen Cusack as Dot. The Ravinia Festival in Highland Park, Illinois, presented three semi-staged performances from September 3 to 4, 2004, with Michael Cerveris in the title roles, Audra McDonald as Dot/Marie, and Patti LuPone as Yvonne/Blair Daniels. It was directed by Lonny Price. New Line Theatre in St. Louis, Missouri, produced the show in 2004.

The London revival team mounted a production in April 2009 at Seattle's 5th Avenue Theatre, featuring Hugh Panaro as the title roles, Billie Wildrick as Dot/Marie, Patti Cohenour as Yvonne/Naomi, Anne Allgood as Harriet/Nurse/Mrs, and Allen Fitzpatrick as Jules/Bob. A revival was scheduled to run at the Barbican Centre in London in 2027, starring Jonathan Bailey and Ariana Grande, but they both withdrew, and it was cancelled.

From April 15 to 25, 2013, the musical was performed in the English language at the Théâtre du Châtelet in Paris, directed by Lee Blakeley featuring the Orchestre Philharmonique de Radio France led by David Charles Abell. George was played by Julian Ovenden. Dot/Marie was played by Sophie-Louise Dann. Michael Starobin reworked his musical arrangements for the full orchestra. The production was taped for radio and TV and has been frequently broadcast in the French Mezzo HD channel which usually only rebroadcasts in-house productions of classical music, opera and jazz that were first presented live on its sister channel Mezzo Live HD.

The 2017 Broadway revival production was replicated in 2023 at Pasadena Playhouse, reuniting director Sarna Lapine and costume designer Clint Ramos. It starred Graham Phillips and Krystina Alabado.

== Musical numbers ==
Act I

- "Sunday in the Park with George" – Dot, George
- "No Life" – Jules, Yvonne
- "Color and Light" – Dot, George
- "Gossip" – Celeste #1, Celeste #2, Boatman, Nurse, Old Lady, Jules, Yvonne, Dot
- "The Dog Song" – George
- "The Day Off" – George, Nurse, Frieda, Franz, Boatman, Company
- "Everybody Loves Louis" – Dot
- "The One on the Left" – Soldier, Celeste #1, Celeste #2, George
- "Finishing the Hat" – George
- "The Day Off" (Reprise) – Company
- "We Do Not Belong Together" – Dot, George
- "Beautiful" – Old Lady, George
- "Sunday" – George, Company

Act II

- "It's Hot Up Here" – Dot, Yvonne, Louise, Franz, Nurse, Celeste #1, Celeste #2, Frieda, Jules, Soldier, Old Lady, Boatman, Louis
- "Chromolume #7" – Orchestra
- "Gossip" (Reprise) – Harriet Pawling, Billy Webster, Bob Greenberg, Charles Redmond, Betty, Alex, Naomi Eisen
- "Putting It Together" – George, Marie, Bob, Harriet, Billy, Elaine, Charles, Naomi, Lee Randolph, Dennis, Betty, Alex, Blair Daniels
- "Children and Art" – Marie, George
- "Lesson #8" – George
- "Move On" – George, Dot
- "Sunday" (Reprise) – George, Dot, Company

== Cast and characters ==
Characters	Broadway	London	Kennedy Center	London Revival	Broadway Revival	Broadway Revival
Characters	1984	1990	2002	2005	2008	2017
Georges Seurat George	Mandy Patinkin	Philip Quast	Raúl Esparza	Daniel Evans	Daniel Evans	Jake Gyllenhaal
Dot Marie	Bernadette Peters	Maria Friedman	Melissa Errico	Anna-Jane Casey	Jenna Russell	Annaleigh Ashford
Old Lady Blair Daniels	Barbara Bryne	Sheila Ballantine	Linda Stephens	Gay Soper	Mary Beth Peil	Penny Fuller
Jules Bob Greenberg	Charles Kimbrough	Gary Raymond	Cris Groenendaal	Simon Green	Michael Cumpsty	Robert Sean Leonard
Yvonne Naomi Eisen	Dana Ivey	Nyree Dawn Porter	Florence Lacey	Liza Sadovy	Jessica Molaskey	Erin Davie
A Soldier Alex	Robert Westenberg	Nicolas Colicos	Matthew Shepard	Christopher Colley	Santino Fontana	Claybourne Elder
The Boatman	William Parry; Act II: Charles Redmond	Michael Atwell; Act II: Lee Randolph	Michael L. Forrest; Act II: Charles Redmond	Alasdair Harvey; Act II: Dennis	Alexander Gemignani; Act II: Dennis	Phillip Boykin; Act II: Lee Randolph
Nurse	Judith Moore; Act II: Harriet Pawling	Nuala Willis; Act II: Harriet Pawling	Donna Migliaccio; Act II: Harriet Pawling	Joanne Redman; Act II: Harriet Pawling	Anne L. Nathan; Act II: Harriet Pawling	Jennifer Sanchez; Act II: Samantha
Mrs.	Judith Moore; Act II: Harriet Pawling	Vivienne Martin; Act II: Billy Webster	Donna Migliaccio; Act II: Harriet Pawling	Joanne Redman; Act II: Harriet Pawling	Anne L. Nathan; Act II: Harriet Pawling	Liz McCartney; Act II: Harriet Pawling
Franz	Brent Spiner; Act II: Dennis	Michael O'Connor; Act II: Dennis	Jason Gilbert; Act II: Dennis	Steven Kynman; Act II: Lee Randolph	David Turner; Act II: Lee Randolph	David Turner; Act II: Dennis
Celeste #1	Melanie Vaughan; Act II: A Waitress	Megan Kelly; Act II: Chromolume Performer	Tracy Lynn Olivera; Act II: A Waitress	Sarah French Ellis; Act II: Elaine	Brynn O'Malley; Act II: Elaine	Ashley Park; Act II: A Waitress
Celeste #2	Mary D'Arcy; Act II: Elaine	Clare Burt; Act II: Betty	Sherri Edelen; Act II: Elaine	Kaisa Hammarlund; Act II: Silent Artist	Jessica Grové; Act II: Silent Artist	Jenni Barber; Act II: Elaine
Frieda	Nancy Opel; Act II: Betty	Di Botcher; Act II: Elaine	Amy McWilliams; Act II: Betty	Anna Lowe; Act II: Betty	Stacie Morgain Lewis; Act II: Betty	Ruthie Ann Miles; Act II: Betty
Louis	Cris Groenendaal; Act II: Billy Webster	Aneriin Huws; Act II: Chromolume performer	Bob McDonald; Act II: Billy Webster	Ian McLarnon; Act II: Billy Webster	Drew McVety; Act II: Billy Webster	Jordan Gelber; Act II: Billy Webster
Mr.	Kurt Knudson; Act II: Lee Randolph	Matt Zimmerman; Act II: Charles Redmond	Harry A. Winter; Act II: Lee Randolph	Mark McKerracher; Act II: Charles Redmond	Ed Dixon; Act II: Charles Redmond	Brooks Ashmanskas; Act II: Charles Redmond
Louise	Danielle Ferland	Ann Gosling	Annie Simon	Lauren Calpin Georgina Hendry Natalie Paris	Kelsey Fowler Alison Horowitz	Mattea Conforti

=== Notable replacements ===
==== Original Broadway production (1984-85) ====
- Georges Seurat/George: Robert Westenberg, Cris Groenendaal, Harry Groener, Jeff Keller (u/s), Howard McGillin (u/s)
- Dot/Marie: Betsy Joslyn, Maryann Plunkett
- Jules/Bob Greenberg: Jeff Keller (u/s)
- A Soldier/Alex: Cris Groenendaal, Howard McGillin, Jeff Keller
- Franz/Dennis: Bruce Adler, Cris Groenendaal (u/s), Jeff Keller (u/s)
- Celeste #2: Betsy Joslyn
- Louis/Billy Webster: Jeff Keller
- A Waitress: Betsy Joslyn

==== London revival (2005-06) ====
- Dot/Marie: Jenna Russell

==== 1st Broadway revival (2008) ====
- Georges Seurat/George: Santino Fontana (u/s)
- A Soldier/Alex: Jeff Kready (u/s)
- Franz/Lee Randolph: Jeff Kready (u/s)
- Louis/Billy Webster: Jeff Kready (u/s)

==== 2nd Broadway revival (2017) ====
- Georges Seurat/George: Claybourne Elder (u/s)
- Dot/Marie: Ashley Park (u/s), Jenni Barber (u/s)
- Jules/Bob Greenberg: Andrew Kober (u/s)
- A Soldier/Alex: Andrew Kober (u/s)
- Boatman/Lee Randolph: Andrew Kober (u/s)
- Franz/Dennis: Andrew Kober (u/s)
- Mr./Charles Redmond: Andrew Kober (u/s)

== Television and video ==
Sunday in the Park with George was taped on October 21–25, 1985, at the Booth Theatre with the original Broadway cast except for Kurt Knudson and Danielle Ferland, whose roles were played by Frank Kopyc and Natalie Polizzi. It was broadcast on American television on February 18, 1986, on Showtime and on June 16, 1986, on PBS's American Playhouse. (Bernadette Peters, who was performing in Song and Dance at the time of the taping, was given time off from that play to tape this production.) Warner Home Video released the recording on VHS on April 1, 1992; Image Entertainment released the DVD and laserdisc on March 23, 1999. The DVD includes full-length commentary by Sondheim, Lapine, Patinkin, and Peters.

An audio registration of the 2013 Paris production at the Théâtre du Châtelet was broadcast on Radio France, a video registration on TV channel Mezzo TV.

A number of Desperate Housewives episodes take their names from songs or lyrics from the musical. These include:

- "Move On" – season 1, episode 11
- "Sunday in the Park with George" – season 1, episode 21
- "Color and Light" – season 2, episode 7
- "Gossip" – season 3, episode 20
- "Art Isn't Easy" – season 4, episode 5
- "Sunday" – season 4, episode 11
- "A Vision's Just a Vision" – season 5, episode 10
- "Chromolume No. 7" – season 6, episode 17
- "The Art of Making Art" – season 8, episode 5
- "Putting It Together" – season 8, episode 9
- "Finishing the Hat" – season 8, episode 23

== Cast recordings ==
The 1984 original Broadway cast recording was released by RCA, with a remastered version released in March 2007 (ASIN: B0009A40KW). Produced by Thomas Z. Shepard, the recording won the 1984 Grammy Award for Best Cast Show Album.

The 2005 London revival cast recording was released by PS Classics (2 disc set) on May 30, 2006 (ASIN: B000EZ9048). The most complete recording of the score to date, it contains a bonus track, the original, extended version of the cut "soldier song", "The One on the Left"—of which only a fraction survives in the final show—performed by the production's Soldier and Celestes (Christopher Colley, Sarah French-Ellis and Kaisa Hammarlund).

The 2017 Broadway revival cast recording was released by Warner Music Group.

== Awards and nominations ==
=== Original Broadway production ===
Year	Award ceremony	Category	Nominee	Result
1984	Tony Award	Best Musical		Nominated
1984	Tony Award	Best Original Score	Stephen Sondheim	Nominated
1984	Tony Award	Best Book of a Musical	James Lapine	Nominated
1984	Tony Award	Best Actor in a Musical	Mandy Patinkin	Nominated
1984	Tony Award	Best Actress in a Musical	Bernadette Peters	Nominated
1984	Tony Award	Best Featured Actress in a Musical	Dana Ivey	Nominated
1984	Tony Award	Best Costume Design	Patricia Zipprodt and Ann Hould-Ward	Nominated
1984	Tony Award	Best Direction of a Musical	James Lapine	Nominated
1984	Tony Award	Best Scenic Design	Tony Straiges	Won
1984	Tony Award	Best Lighting Design	Richard Nelson	Won
1984	Drama Desk Award	Outstanding Musical		Won
1984	Drama Desk Award	Outstanding Book of a Musical	James Lapine	Won
1984	Drama Desk Award	Outstanding Actor in a Musical	Mandy Patinkin	Nominated
1984	Drama Desk Award	Outstanding Actress in a Musical	Bernadette Peters	Nominated
1984	Drama Desk Award	Outstanding Featured Actor in a Musical	Charles Kimbrough	Nominated
1984	Drama Desk Award	Outstanding Director of a Musical	James Lapine	Won
1984	Drama Desk Award	Outstanding Orchestrations	Michael Starobin	Won
1984	Drama Desk Award	Outstanding Lyrics	Stephen Sondheim	Won
1984	Drama Desk Award	Outstanding Music	Stephen Sondheim	Nominated
1984	Drama Desk Award	Outstanding Costume Design	Patricia Zipprodt and Ann Hould-Ward	Nominated
1984	Drama Desk Award	Outstanding Lighting Design	Richard Nelson	Won
1984	Drama Desk Award	Outstanding Set Design	Tony Straiges	Won
1984	Drama Desk Award	Outstanding Special Effects	Bran Ferren	Won
1984	New York Drama Critics' Circle Award	Best Musical	Stephen Sondheim and James Lapine	Won
1985	Pulitzer Prize	Pulitzer Prize for Drama	Stephen Sondheim and James Lapine	Won

=== Original London production ===
Year	Award ceremony	Category	Nominee	Result
1991	Laurence Olivier Award	Best New Musical		Won
1991	Laurence Olivier Award	Best Actor in a Musical	Philip Quast	Won
1991	Laurence Olivier Award	Best Director of a Musical	Steven Pimlott	Nominated
1991	Laurence Olivier Award	Best Actress in a Musical	Maria Friedman	Nominated
1991	Laurence Olivier Award	Best Costume Design	Tom Cairns	Nominated
1991	Laurence Olivier Award	Best Set Design	Tom Cairns	Nominated

=== 2005 London revival ===
Year	Award ceremony	Category	Nominee	Result
2005	Critics' Circle Theatre Award	Best Designer	Timothy Bird and David Farley	Won
2007	Laurence Olivier Award	Outstanding Musical Production		Won
2007	Laurence Olivier Award	Best Actor in a Musical	Daniel Evans	Won
2007	Laurence Olivier Award	Best Actress in a Musical	Jenna Russell	Won
2007	Laurence Olivier Award	Best Set Design	Timothy Bird and David Farley	Won
2007	Laurence Olivier Award	Best Lighting Design	Natasha Chivers and Mike Robertson	Won
2007	Laurence Olivier Award	Best Director	Sam Buntrock	Nominated

=== 2008 Broadway revival ===
Year	Award ceremony	Category	Nominee	Result
2008	Drama League Award	Distinguished Revival of a Musical		Nominated
2008	Drama League Award	Distinguished Performance	Daniel Evans	Nominated
2008	Drama League Award	Distinguished Performance	Jenna Russell	Nominated
2008	Drama Desk Award	Outstanding Revival of a Musical		Nominated
2008	Drama Desk Award	Outstanding Actor in a Musical	Daniel Evans	Nominated
2008	Drama Desk Award	Outstanding Actress in a Musical	Jenna Russell	Nominated
2008	Drama Desk Award	Outstanding Director of a Musical	Sam Buntrock	Nominated
2008	Drama Desk Award	Outstanding Orchestrations	Jason Carr	Won
2008	Drama Desk Award	Outstanding Lighting Design	Ken Billington	Nominated
2008	Drama Desk Award	Outstanding Projection Design	Timothy Bird and The Knifedge Creative Network	Won
2008	Outer Critics Circle Award	Outstanding Revival of a Musical		Nominated
2008	Outer Critics Circle Award	Outstanding Actor in a Musical	Daniel Evans	Nominated
2008	Outer Critics Circle Award	Outstanding Set Design	Timothy Bird and David Farley	Won
2008	Outer Critics Circle Award	Outstanding Costume Design	David Farley	Nominated
2008	Outer Critics Circle Award	Outstanding Lighting Design	Ken Billington	Won
2008	Tony Award	Best Revival of a Musical		Nominated
2008	Tony Award	Best Performance by a Leading Actor in a Musical	Daniel Evans	Nominated
2008	Tony Award	Best Performance by a Leading Actress in a Musical	Jenna Russell	Nominated
2008	Tony Award	Best Direction of a Musical	Sam Buntrock	Nominated
2008	Tony Award	Best Orchestrations	Jason Carr	Nominated
2008	Tony Award	Best Scenic Design	Timothy Bird and David Farley	Nominated
2008	Tony Award	Best Costume Design	David Farley	Nominated
2008	Tony Award	Best Lighting Design	Ken Billington	Nominated
2008	Tony Award	Best Sound Design	Sebastian Frost	Nominated
