= Idiot's Delight (film) =

1939 film by Clarence Brown

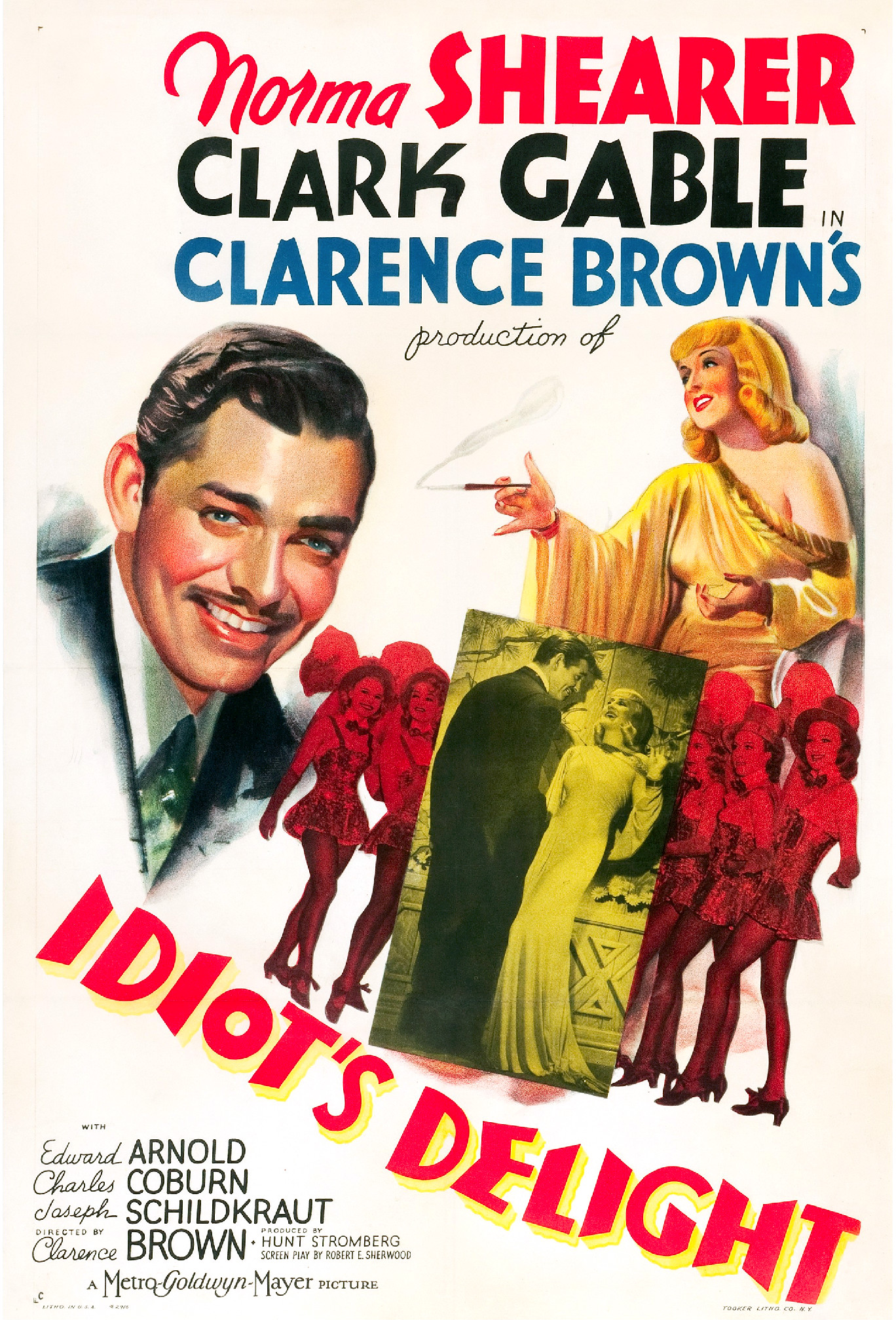
- Theatrical release poster
- Directed by: Clarence Brown
- Written by: Robert E. Sherwood
- Based on: Idiot's Delight; 1936 play by Robert E. Sherwood
- Produced by: Clarence Brown; Hunt Stromberg
- Starring: Norma Shearer; Clark Gable; Edward Arnold; Charles Coburn; Joseph Schildkraut; Burgess Meredith
- Cinematography: William H. Daniels
- Edited by: Robert Kern
- Music by: Herbert Stothart
- Production company: Metro-Goldwyn-Mayer
- Distributed by: Loew's, Inc.
- Release date: January 27, 1939
- Running time: 107 minutes
- Country: United States
- Languages: English; Esperanto
- Budget: $1.5 million
- Box office: $1.7 million (worldwide)

Idiot's Delight is a 1939 American MGM comedy drama with a screenplay adapted by Robert E. Sherwood from his 1936 Pulitzer-Prize-winning play of the same name. The production reunited director Clarence Brown, Clark Gable and Norma Shearer eight years after they worked together on A Free Soul. The play takes place in a hotel in the Italian Alps during 24 hours at the beginning of a world war. The film begins with the backstory of the two leads and transfers the later action to a fictitious Alpine country rather than Italy, which was the setting for the play. In fact, Europe was on the brink of World War II. (The studio's attempts to make the film palatable for the totalitarian states—including the hazy geographical location and the scrupulous use of Esperanto in speech and signage—were a waste of time. They banned it anyway.) Although not a musical, it is notable as the only film in which Gable sings and dances, performing Irving Berlin's "Puttin' On the Ritz" with a sextette of chorus girls.

== Plot ==
Harry Van, an American World War I veteran, tries to reenter show business and ends up in a faltering mentalist show with Madame Zuleika, an inept, aging alcoholic. While performing in Omaha, Nebraska, he is wooed by Irene, a trapeze artist who claims to be a refugee from the Russian Revolution and hopes to replace Harry's drunken partner in the show and as his lover. They have a romantic night, but he is suspicious of Irene's flights of fancy. The next day, Harry and Zuleika and Irene and her troupe board trains going in opposite directions.

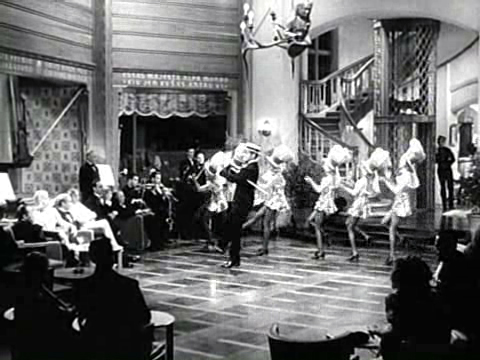
Clark Gable singing and dancing to Irving Berlin's "Puttin' On the Ritz"

Twenty years later, after a number of jobs, Harry is the impresario for and lead performer with Les Blondes, a troupe of six women traveling through Europe. While taking a train from Romania to Switzerland, they are stranded at an Alpine hotel in an unnamed country, whose borders are suddenly closed as war becomes imminent. The passengers watch through the hotel lounge's huge windows as dozens of bombers take off from an air field at the bottom of the valley and fly away in formation.

Among the passengers in the lounge, Harry observes Irene, a glamorous platinum blonde with an exaggerated Russian accent, who is the mistress of a wealthy armaments manufacturer, Achille Weber. Although she claims never to have been to Omaha, Harry's innuendoes show he is convinced that she is the brunette acrobat he knew there. He believes that she recognizes him, too. An agitated pacifist rants to his fellow travelers about Weber's guns, which he says are behind the war that just started, and describes for them how the planes they saw disappear over the spectacular mountains will be killing thousands of people in other countries. The pacifist is hauled away and shot by the border police, commanded by the friendly and impeccable Captain Kirvline, who mingles with the travelers while they wait at the hotel.

In their hotel suite, Irene explodes and tells Weber "the truth [she has] always wanted to tell." She blames him for the likely deaths of untold numbers of people in the war, whose victims might include the newlywed English couple, the Cherrys, they met at the hotel, all killed with the weapons that Weber sells.

The Swiss border opens again the next day, and the people at the hotel are told to continue on their journeys. They learn they had better be off as soon as possible because foreign countries are likely to retaliate today for yesterday's air raid and bomb the air field below the hotel, which could be hit by mistake. As everyone rushes to leave, Irene finds out that Weber has decided to dump her: He refuses to vouch for her flimsy League of Nations passport to Capt. Kirvline, who tells Irene she must stay at the hotel.

Having escorted Les Blondes to the Swiss border, Harry returns to stay with Irene. She admits she is the woman he met in Omaha 20 years ago, and she still loves him. Harry talks about her future, performing with him and the blondes. They hear approaching planes and are told to run to the shelter, but Irene declares she does not want to die in a cellar. As Harry tries to take her there anyway, a bomb hits the hotel and blocks their escape from the lounge.

=== Alternate endings ===
In the play, the curtain goes down on Harry and Irene as they sing "Onward, Christian Soldiers" while bombs explode outside, leaving their survival an open question. That ending was filmed, but the New York Times reported in January 1939 that preview audiences hated it. Retakes were ordered. The two surviving versions of the film's ending show the couple safe and happy after surviving the air raid.

In an ending intended for international audiences, Irene asks Harry to play a hymn, something from his childhood. They quietly sing "Abide with Me", their backs turned to the furious air battle behind them. “I've loved you all the time,” he says. “Thanks for telling me, darling,” she replies. The explosions stop. “Look Harry, they've gone away,” Irene cries, and they embrace.

In 1999, TCM aired a print that shows both endings. After "The End" a title card says: "You have just seen the original 'International' 1939 ending of MGM's 'Idiots [sic] Delight' which is spiritual and optimistic in tone. We now present the original 'domestic' theatrical ending that seems to ignore the fact that the rest of the world is at war." In the domestic (U.S. and Canadian) ending, Harry and Irene talk about their plans for the future while the bombs explode outside the lobby window. They rehearse the secret code he used in his mind-reading act. The bombing stops and Irene excitedly describes their future act together while Harry plays the damaged piano. In September 2022, Watch TCM was only showing the international ending.

== Cast ==
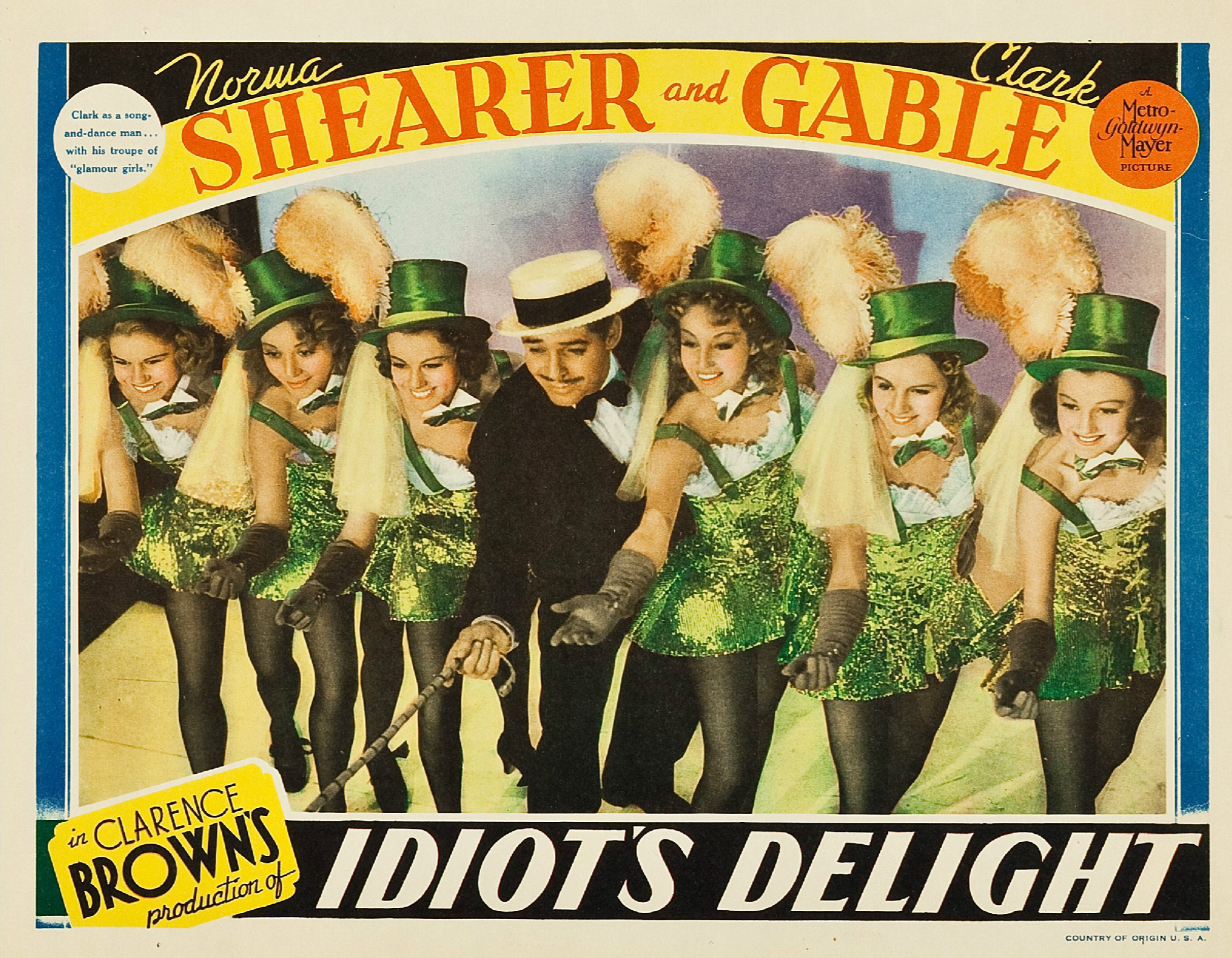
Lobby card

- Norma Shearer as Irene
- Clark Gable as Harry Van
- Edward Arnold as Achille Weber
- Charles Coburn as Dr. Waldersee
- Joseph Schildkraut as Captain Kirvline
- Burgess Meredith as Quillery
- Laura Hope Crews as Madame Zuleika
- Richard "Skeets" Gallagher as Donald Navadel (credited as Skeets Gallagher)
- Peter Willes as Mr. Cherry
- Pat Paterson as Mrs. Cherry
- William Edmunds as Dumptsy
- Fritz Feld as Pittatek
- Virginia Grey as Shirley
- Virginia Dale as Francine
- Paula Stone as Beulah
- Bernadene Hayes as Edna
- Joan Marsh as Elaine
- Lorraine Krueger as BeBe
- Emory Parnell as Fifth Avenue Mounted Cop

== Production ==
In an effort to make the play, staged entirely in the hotel lounge, less wordy and more attractive to watch on the screen, Sherwood wrote the script for MGM with 167 scenes on 42 sets. The Internet Movie Database says that Vicki Baum, most famous for Grand Hotel, did uncredited work on the screenplay.

When Warner Bros. considered filming Sherwood's play, film censor Joseph Breen predicted it "would be banned widely abroad and might cause reprisals against the American company distributing it. The play is fundamentally anti-war propaganda, and contains numerous diatribes against militarism, fascism, and the munitions ring." MGM tried to address similar concerns, eventually hiring Italy's consul in Los Angeles as adviser. Rome agreed to cooperate on the production. In the end—although the script was supposedly approved by Fascist leader Benito Mussolini—Italy banned the film.

“Idiot's delight" refers to one of several games of solitaire or patience. In the play, Irene berates armaments manufacturer Weber (whose mistress she is) for his contribution to the war. He replies: “I am but the humble instrument of His divine will.” Her answer: “We don't do half enough justice to Him. Poor, lonely old soul. Sitting up in heaven, with nothing to do, but play solitaire. Poor, dear God. Playing idiot's delight.”. In the film, Capt. Kirvline mumbles “idiot's delight" when Harry asks him the reason for the war.

TCM.com observes: “This was the only film in which Clark Gable performed a dance number. He spent 6 weeks rehearsing the steps with the dance director George King, and practicing at home with his wife, Carole Lombard. Because of his fear of messing it up during a take, the set was closed during the filming of this sequence. When Gable had to sing ‘Puttin’ on the Ritz’ he actually had to be carried off by Les Blondes, so they saved that [scene] for last in case he was injured. On the day of the shooting Carole Lombard came to watch and was amazed that it only took one take.”

Norma Shearer's distinctive pageboy hairstyle was copied from the hairstyle worn by Lynn Fontanne when she originated the character in the Broadway production of the stage play.

== Reception ==
A December 31, 1938, review in Variety praised author Robert Sherwood, saying he "deftly added an entertaining prolog establishing the early meeting and a one-night affair between Clark Gable and Norma Shearer in Omaha as small time vaudeville performers. This provides plenty of entertainment when the pair meet later in an Alpine hotel."

On February 3, 1939, the New York Times critic raved in a long review: “It is with boundless enthusiasm, with uncritical hornpipes in the street, and wild huzzas of approval that finally, at long last, we hail the arrival of an adult picture on the local screen. As a profoundly bitter preview—profound because its bitterness wears the mask of comedy—of the trivial circumstances which will undoubtedly attend the beginning of the next World War, "Idiot's Delight," at the Capitol, is as timely as tomorrow's front page... by the very nature of its theme, (it) exposes the essential idiocy and pointlessness of militarism, ... the suicidal greed, the monstrous complacency toward death and destruction which are not racial, but universal; not individual, but mass phenomena, as ugly and as international as hate. ....As for the chief characters, they have retained their considerable, if somewhat pat, theatrical charm, and they are still Mr. Sherwood's. ... we are ready to suppose that the present American ending, on what can only be described as a note of defiant hooferism, with Gable pounding on the piano and Miss Shearer ecstatically "trucking" as the walls collapse, was the best that was cinematically available. (There is a different ending for Great Britain, with sentimental songs). Even that effect of the conventional movie fadeout, as the bombers recede, we can accept.” Recalling the play's ending, he observed: “No doubt the fine irony of Mr. Sherwood's conclusion that feeling, as the "two cheap people" burst hysterically into "Onward Christian Soldiers." that the gods were laughing would have been unseemly in a movie theatre. ... Did we say that "Idiot's Delight" makes a swell movie? If you don't see it you'll be missing one of the year's events.”

Writing in The Spectator, Graham Greene observed: “Over-acting could hardly go further...”

Nelson Bell observed in The Washington Post on February 8, 1939: “Mr. Sherwood selected his title with a view to epitomizing his free notions of the motivation, in presumably high places, of armed conflict. His editorial instinct is highly emblazoned in the expression, in two words, of the only feasible basis that can exist for the precipitation of international slaughter.”

== Box office ==
According to MGM records, the film recorded a loss of $374,000, one of only three films that Clark Gable made at MGM to lose money. The others are Parnell and Too Hot to Handle.
