= The 1940's Radio Hour =

- 1979 Broadway Playbill
- Music: Various Composers
- Lyrics: Various Lyricists
- Book: Walton Jones
- Productions: 1979 Broadway

The 1940's Radio Hour is a musical by Walton Jones. Using popular songs from the 1940s, it portrays the final holiday broadcast of the Mutual Manhattan Variety Cavalcade on the New York radio station WOV in December 1942. The show opened at St. James Theatre on October 7, 1979 after 14 previews and closed on January 6, 1980 after 105 shows.

== Plot ==
A little New York City radio station called WOV records a broadcast for American soldiers serving overseas in World War II. The narrative concerns the harassed producer, the drunken lead singer, the second banana who dreams of singing a ballad, the delivery boy who wants a chance in front of the mic, and the young trumpet player who chooses a fighter plane over Glenn Miller.

== Characters ==
Character	Description	Original Broadway actor
Clifton A. Feddington	The overworked general manager and announcer at WOV	Josef Sommer
Ann Collier	The 'old standard' in the Radio show since its start in 1936. She sings like Dinah Shore, Doris Day, and Peggy Lee all rolled into one. She is a secretary by day, and is dating Johnny.	Mary Cleere Haran
Johnny Cantone	Featured vocalist and Sinatra fan. He's an ex-boxer and a rough guy who drinks too much and has a voice like velvet.	Jeff Keller
Ginger Brooks	A bubble-headed waitress-turned-singer. She has a pinup, Betty Grable look with lots of makeup and speaks with a Gracie Allen vacancy.	Crissy Wilzak
Geneva Lee Browne	The southern Belle of WOV got her start in music at age 17 performing in local Swing ballrooms around the Atlanta area.	Dee Dee Bridgewater
Neal Tilden	A cab driver by day and singer, dancer, and choreographer at night. He aspires to the 'featured vocalist' slot.	Joe Grifasi
B.J. Gibson	The third of the Gibson brothers to work for the Cavalcade. He is squeaky-clean, good looking, and a preppy student at Yale.	Stephen James
Connie Miller	A 17-year-old bobbysoxer from Ogden, Utah. She is perennially in love and runs an elevator by day.	Kathy Andrini
Pops Bailey	A crotchety, wizened stage doorkeeper who is a racing bookie on the company phone and reads hidden copies of Show Girl magazine.	Arny Freeman
Lou Cohn	A big shot (at least in his own mind) who tries to impress the girls and is sometimes obnoxious. He runs the show and is the sound effects man.	Merwin Goldsmith
Wally Ferguson	A young hopeful from Altoona, Pennsylvania, who came to NYC to work for his uncle at the drugstore to get his big show-biz break.	Jack Hallett
Biff Baker	A young trumpet player with the Zoot Doubleman orchestra who will be leaving after the concert for Army duty.	John Doolittle
Stanley	A lugs cable and runs around a lot and otherwise lives in the control booth.	John Sloman
Zoot Doubleman	The WOV Orchestra Leader	Stanley Lebowsky

== List of Musical Numbers ==
- "(I've Got a Gal In) Kalamazoo" – Clifton, Chorus ("Chattanooga Choo Choo" in earlier editions)
- "Pepsi Cola" – Neal, B.J., Connie, Ginger (with sounds performed by Lou)
- "Daddy" – Connie, The Band
- "Love Is Here to Stay" – Johnny
- "That Old Black Magic" – Ann
- "Ain't She Sweet" – Biff, All
- "How About You?" – B.J., Connie
- "Blue Moon" – Neal
- "Chiquita Banana" – All Girls
- "Rose of the Rio Grande" – Geneva, Men & The Band
- "I'll Never Smile Again" – Johnny, Quintet (Neal, B.J., Ann, Ginger, Connie)
- "Boogie Woogie Bugle Boy" – B.J., Connie, Ginger
- "Blues in the Night" – Ginger, Men
- "Jingle Bells" – All (except Johnny)
- "I Got It Bad (and That Ain't Good)" – Geneva
- "You Go to My Head" - B.J. ("At Last" in earlier editions)
- "The Five O'Clock Whistle" – Connie, The Band ("Little Brown Jug" in earlier editions)
- "Have Yourself a Merry Little Christmas" – Ann
- "Strike Up the Band" – Full Company
- "I'll Be Seeing You" – Full Company
- "Mutual Manhattan Variety Cavalcade" – Full Company
