= Nikki Renée Daniels =

American stage actress

Nikki Renée Daniels is a stage actress best known for her performances in musicals on Broadway, including as Nabulungi in The Book of Mormon.

== Early life and education ==
Daniels was born in Atlanta, Georgia, to a mother who taught preschool and a father who managed a meat packing company. She started singing at the age of 13 and attended a performing arts high school in Atlanta. She earned a BFA in Musical Theatre from the University of Cincinnati – College-Conservatory of Music.

== Career ==
Daniels moved to New York City and made her Broadway debut in the musical Aida in 2000. Over the next decade, her Broadway credits included Nine (2003) as Renata, The Look of Love (2003) as Pit Singer, Little Shop of Horrors (2004) as the understudy for Chiffon, Crystal and Ronnette, Lestat (2006) as Eleni. Les Misérables (2007) as Fantine. Further Broadway roles were in |Promises, Promises (2010) as Barbara, Anything Goes (2011) as the understudy for Hope, Porgy & Bess (2012) as Clara, The Book of Mormon (2014–2018) as Nabulungi, Company (2021–2022) as Jenny and understudy for Bobbie (the first Black actor to play Bobbie on Broadway) and Once Upon a Mattress (2024), as Lady Larken.

Her other theatre credits include Ragtime as Sarah (2002; North Shore Music Theatre, Massachusetts), Dorian as Celia Vane (2002, Denver Center, Colorado), Anything Goes as Hope (2006, Williamstown Theatre Festival, Massachusetts), Ray Charles Live! as Della B (2007, Pasadena Playhouse, California), Beauty and the Beast as Belle, (2008, American Musical Theatre of San Jose, California), Caroline, or Change as Emmie (2009, The Gunthrie, Minnesota), 1776 as Martha Jefferson (2016, Encores!, New York) and Hamilton as Angelica Schuyler (2019, CIBC Theatre, Chicago).

== Theatre credits ==
Year	Production	Role	Location	Ref
2000	Aida	Nehebka, Ensemble, u/s Aida	Broadway, Palace Theatre	
2002	Ragtime	Sarah	Massachusetts, North Shore Music Theatre	
2002	Dorian	Celia Vane	Colorado, Denver Center	
2003	Nine	Renata	Broadway, Eugene O'Neill Theatre	
2003	The Look of Love	Pit Singer	Broadway, Brooks Atkinson Theatre	
2004	Little Shop of Horrors	u/s Chiffon, Crystal, Ronette	Broadway, Virginia Theatre	
2004	Little Shop of Horrors	u/s Chiffon, Crystal, Ronette	National tour	
2006	Lestat	Eleni	Broadway, Palace Theatre	
2006	Anything Goes	Hope Harcourt	Massachusetts, Williamstown Theatre Festival	
2006	Les Misérables	Factory Worker/Madeleine/Whore, u/s Fantine	Broadway, Broadhurst Theatre	
2007	Les Misérables	Fantine	Broadway, Broadhurst Theatre	
2007	Ray Charles Live!	Della B	California, Pasadena Playhouse	
2008	Beauty and the Beast	Belle	California, American Musical Theatre of San Jose	
2009	Caroline, or Change	Emmie	Minnesota, The Gunthrie	
2010	Promises, Promises	Barbara, Orchestra Voice	Broadway, Broadway Theatre	
2011	Anything Goes	Passenger, u/s Hope Harcourt	Broadway, Stephen Sondheim Theatre	
2011	Porgy and Bess	Clara	Boston, American Repertory Theater	
2012	Porgy and Bess	Clara	Broadway, Richard Rodgers Theatre	
2014	The Book of Mormon	Nabulungi	Broadway Eugene O'Neill Theatre	
2019	Hamilton	Angelica Schuyler	Chicago, CIBC Theatre	
2021	Company	Jenny, u/s Bobbie	Broadway, Bernard B. Jacobs Theatre	
2024	Once Upon a Mattress	Lady Larken	Broadway, Hudson Theatre	

== Film ==
Year	Project	Role	Notes	Ref
2021	The Waves in Quarantine	Self		
2023	Black Broadway: A Proud History, A Limitless Future	Self	Concert TV special	
2024	Wicked	Vocal ensemble		

== Recordings ==
Her debut solo album, Home, was released in 2012, to generally positive reviews. Tituss Burgess and Jeff Kready each featured on a song.

== Concerts ==
- Children and Art (Stephen Sondheim 75th birthday tribute; New Amsterdam Theatre, 2005)
- The Secret Garden as Rose Lennox (Lincoln Center, David Geffen Hall, 2016)
- 1776 as Martha Jefferson (Encores!, New York City Center, 2016)
- I’m Still Here: Celebrating Sondheim (Carnegie Hall, 2022)
- Do You Hear the People Sing? (Hollywood Bowl, 2024)
- Children of Eden as Eve/Mama Noah (Lincoln Center, David Geffen Hall, 2024)
- Follies (Carnegie Hall, 2024)
- Broadway Backwards (Gershwin Theatre, 2025)

== Honors and awards ==
Year	Award	Category	For	Status
2012	IRNE Award	Large Theater: Best Supporting Actress (Musical)	Porgy & Bess (A.R.T.)	Nominated

== Personal life ==
Daniels is married to actor Jeff Kready, whom she met during the 2006 Broadway revival of Les Misérables. The couple wed in 2009 and have two children.
