= A Christmas Carol (2004 film) =

2004 TV film directed by Arthur Allan Seidelman

- DVD poster
- Also known as: A Christmas Carol: The Musical
- Based on: A Christmas Carol by; Mike Ockrent; Lynn Ahrens; A Christmas Carol by Charles Dickens
- Teleplay by: Lynn Ahrens
- Directed by: Arthur Allan Seidelman
- Starring: Kelsey Grammer; Jesse L. Martin; Jane Krakowski; Jennifer Love Hewitt; Geraldine Chaplin; Jason Alexander; Jacob Collier
- Music by: Alan Menken
- Country of origin: United States
- Original language: English

Production
- Executive producers: Camille Grammer; Robert Halmi Sr.; Robert Halmi Jr.
- Producers: Howard Ellis; Steven North
- Cinematography: Hanania Baer
- Editor: Bert Glatstein
- Running time: 87 minutes
- Production company: Hallmark Entertainment
- Budget: $17 million

Original release
- Network: NBC
- Release: November 28, 2004

A Christmas Carol: The Musical is a 2004 American musical television film based on the 1994 stage musical by Alan Menken and Lynn Ahrens inspired by the 1843 novella of the same name by Charles Dickens.

Directed by Arthur Allan Seidelman and written by Ahrens, the film stars Kelsey Grammer, Jesse L. Martin, Jane Krakowski, Jennifer Love Hewitt, Geraldine Chaplin, and Jason Alexander. The film premiered on November 28, 2004, on the NBC television network.

== Plot ==
On Christmas Eve in London, Ebenezer Scrooge, a miserly moneylender at a counting house, has settled his melancholy into an eternal bitterness towards Christmas and his fellow men. He refuses a request from recently widowed Mr. Smythe and his daughter Grace to pay for Mrs. Smythe's funeral, voicing his support for the prisons and workhouses for the poor, and reluctantly accepts the request from his loyal but meek employee Bob Cratchit (who is the constant target of his cruelty) to have Christmas Day off, since there will be no business for Scrooge on the day.

As Scrooge leaves for home, he declines his nephew Fred's invitation to Christmas dinner, and encounters a lamp-lighter, a newspaper seller, and an old blind woman, declining each when they ask for help or to give money for charity. Later, in his house, Scrooge sees the ghost of his deceased, long-time friend and business partner, Jacob Marley, who warns Scrooge to mend his ways, lest he be condemned in the afterlife like Marley was, informing him that three spirits will visit him during the night.

At one o'clock, Scrooge is visited by the fairy-like Ghost of Christmas Past, who shows him visions of his past. His father, John William, was sent to prison for unpaid debts and his mother died shortly after, which saw he and his sister Fan separated. He went to work in a boot factory and never reunited with Fan, who died giving birth to Fred. Along with Marley, Scrooge then apprenticed under Mr. Fezziwig, at which time he met and proposed to a young woman named Emily. He and Marley started to pursue money over people, refusing Fezziwig a loan following a downturn in his business. Emily leaves Scrooge after realizing how hard-hearted he has become and Marley dies after overworking himself, leaving Scrooge alone.

At two o'clock, Scrooge is visited by the merry Ghost of Christmas Present, who shows him how others find joy in Christmas Day. They visit Fred's house, where Fred tells his guests that the love his mother had for Scrooge means he will not give up on his uncle. They also visit the Cratchits' house where, despite being poor than most in London, are still happy with their lot in life. When Scrooge takes pity on Bob's ailing son, Tiny Tim, the Ghost shows him the evils of "Ignorance" and "Want" and comments that Tiny Tim might not survive unless the future changes before he disappears.

At three o'clock, the Ghost of Christmas Yet to Be appears to Scrooge, as a silent woman under a beggar's robes. The Ghost takes Scrooge to a cemetery, where he sees the Cratchits mourning Tiny Tim, who has died. The Ghost then shows him his deceased self, with his housekeeper Mrs. Mopps trading his possessions to a fence named Old Joe. Seeing the death date on his grave is that day, Scrooge vows to change his ways and is surrounded by the Cratchits, Grace and the spirits of his mother and sister, who all encourage him to feel love and compassion again. Scrooge's grave begins to crack, as the future already has begun to change, and Scrooge, misunderstanding this to be a sign he is doomed, tries to run as the Ghost of Christmas Yet to Be throws his bed curtains over him to return him to his bed.

Finding it is Christmas Day, a gleeful Scrooge ventures out to spread happiness and joy throughout London, once again encountering the lamp-lighter, newspaper seller, and blind woman—who are actually the three Ghosts in their human forms—and thanks them. Scrooge pays off Mr. Smythe's debt, reconciles with Fred, then goes to the Cratchits' house. After first putting on a stern demeanour, Scrooge surprises the family with a turkey dinner, and revealing he intends to raise Bob's salary and to help his struggling family. Snow begins to fall as everyone celebrates Christmas Day together.

== Cast ==
- Kelsey Grammer as Ebenezer Scrooge
- Jane Krakowski as Ghost of Christmas Past / Lamp-Lighter
- Jesse L. Martin as Ghost of Christmas Present / Newspaper Seller
- Geraldine Chaplin as Ghost of Christmas Yet to Be / Blind Woman
- Jennifer Love Hewitt as Emily
- Jason Alexander as Jacob Marley
- Edward Gower as Bob Cratchit
- Linzi Hateley as Mrs. Cratchit
- Jacob Collier (Moriarty) as Tiny Tim
- Julian Ovenden as Fred Anderson
- Julie Alannagh-Brighten as Sally Anderson
- Ruthie Henshall as Mrs. Scrooge (Scrooge's mother)
- Mike Kelly as John William Scrooge (Scrooge's father)
- Lea-Verity White as Fan Scrooge Anderson
- Sheila Reid as Mrs. Mops
- Ian McLarnon as Mr. Smythe
- Emily Deamer as Grace Smythe
- Brian Bedford as Mr. Fezziwig
- Claire Moore as Mrs. Fezziwig
- Steven Miller as Young Ebenezer Scrooge
- Christopher Williams as Young Jacob Marley

== The adaptation ==
Lyricist Lynn Ahrens wrote the teleplay, based on her and Mike Ockrent's book for the original Madison Square Garden stage musical. Filming took place in Budapest. The score contains 22 songs, also adapted from the stage. The opening number, "Jolly Good Time", is a more jovial reworking of the first two numbers in the stage version, "The Years Are Passing By" and "Jolly, Rich, and Fat". In the next number, "Nothing to Do With Me", Scrooge first encounters the three ghosts of Christmas in their physical guises as a lamp-lighter (Christmas Past), a charity show-barker (Christmas Present), and a blind beggar woman (Christmas Future). The scene where Scrooge's long-suffering employee Bob Cratchit buys a Christmas chicken with his son Tiny Tim in the song "You Mean More to Me" appears as well.

The visit of the ghost of Jacob Marley becomes a large-scale production number ("Link By Link"), featuring a half-dozen singing, dancing spirits presented with various levels of makeup and special effects. One of these ghosts in this version is known to be an old colleague of Scrooge and Marley's, Mr. Haynes, who was said to be "mean to the bone", resulting in his charred skeleton. Other puns include a headless spirit who wanted to get ahead, a man with a safe full of coins in his chest who "never had a heart" and a man carrying a box that contains his arm because he "never lent a hand".

The Ghost of Christmas Past sings "The Lights of Long Ago", a number reinforcing her signature theme of illuminating Scrooge's worldview. One notable departure from Dickens' novella in this portion of the film is its depiction of Ebenezer Scrooge's father, John William Scrooge, being sentenced to debtors' prison while his helpless family looks on (a scene inspired by events from Dickens' own childhood).

The Ghost of Christmas Present gets two numbers, "Abundance and Charity" and "Christmas Together", in which he makes his point that Christmas is a time for celebration, generosity, and fellowship. The former takes place at a fantastical version of the charity show he was seen promoting on Christmas Eve, and the latter whisks Scrooge on a tour of London that includes the homes of his nephew Fred, his clerk Bob Cratchit, and the innocent daughter of Smythe, a recently widowed client of Scrooge's lending house.

Unlike the faceless phantom that embodies Christmas Yet to Be in various versions of A Christmas Carol (from the book), this film depicts a mute sorceress figure clad in white (a transmogrification of the blind hag who appears on Christmas Eve). The entire sequence of Christmas Future plays out in song ("Dancing On Your Grave", "You Mean More to Me (Reprise)", and "Yesterday, Tomorrow, and Today"), culminating in Scrooge's awakening in his bedroom on Christmas Day.

"What a Day, What a Sky" serves as a musical bookend to "Nothing to Do With Me", dramatizing Scrooge's new outlook as he races through the streets of London making amends. The film concludes with a reprise of "Christmas Together" featuring the entire cast.

== Reception ==
=== Critical response ===
Brian Lowry of Variety called the film the 37th-best production of A Christmas Carol, and the third-best musical version behind Albert Finney in Scrooge and Mr. Magoo. Lowry had a positive opinion of the visuals and special effects but was critical of musical numbers in the film. Despite his mixed feelings about the acting of Kelsey Grammer and Jason Alexander, Lowry praised the performances of Jane Krakowski and Jesse L. Martin. Paul Brownfield of the Los Angeles Times praised Grammer's performance of Scrooge. He also said the actors performing in period costumes gave the film an air of silliness that he found enjoyable if unintended. In addition, Brownfield praised the special effects, the musical numbers and Geraldine Chaplin's acting.

From the review in of The Movie Scene: "whilst "A Christmas Carol: The Musical" is at times as cheesy as it sounds it is also very entertaining. It delivers the classic tale but adds some nice embellishments and of course plenty of musical numbers which occasionally become a bit too much. But it is fun, it will amuse whilst also uplift and thanks to some nice performances from the likes of Kelsey Grammer it will stay with you for a while unlike some other adaptations of "A Christmas Carol"."

Michael Drucker of IGN offered a negative review, feeling that "the cast feels oddly underutilized. Ninety-seven minutes would seem just right for a musical, yet everything here feels a bit rushed. Songs are over far too quickly and as a result come off as unmemorable. The three ghosts come and go way too quickly, giving the viewer little time to accept the change in Scrooge. It almost feels as if they filmmakers cared more about getting a huge ensemble than properly using them. Great actors such as Jesse L. Martin and Jason Alexander don't get nearly enough stage time. And their musical scenes are beyond cheesy. It's a shame since both are such skilled theatrical performers" He is critical of Grammer's performance calling it, "a cartoon character...which makes the change from selfish into selfless unconvincing. Just plain disappointing considering Grammer would've been great if he played the role straight." Another review states, "Kelsey Grammer’s Scrooge ends up being a stagy, theatrical performance. Jennifer Love Hewitt gets second billing behind Kelsey Grammer but it feels like her role as Scrooge’s love Emily has been stretched out of shape in order to cater to her presence. Jason Alexander seems miscast..."

In 2019, Robert Keeling of Den of Geek called it one of the worst adaptations of the story. He criticised the various songs as “do little but detract from the plot” and “just gets grating. The songs are all lifted from a stage musical, and the transition to film is not a wise one”. He also feels Grammer “never really immerses himself into the role”, and that Alexander “appears to be as between Beetlejuice and The Penguin, to terrible effect”.

In a 2012 interview with BroadwayWorld, Lynn Ahrens spoke positively of her experience making the film and praised the performances of Kelsey Grammar, Jennifer Love Hewitt, and Ruthie Henshall.

=== Ratings ===
The film received 8.9 million viewers, making it the third most-watched program the night of its premiere, behind new episodes of Desperate Housewives and Boston Legal on ABC and When Angels Come to Town on CBS.

== See also ==
- List of Christmas films
- List of ghost films
- Adaptations of A Christmas Carol
