= Dance a Little Closer =

1983 American musical play

- Original Cast Recording
- Music: Charles Strouse
- Lyrics: Alan Jay Lerner
- Book: Alan Jay Lerner
- Basis: Robert E. Sherwood's play Idiot's Delight
- Productions: 1983 Broadway

Dance a Little Closer is a musical with a book and lyrics by Alan Jay Lerner and music by Charles Strouse. The story is an updated version of Robert E. Sherwood's 1936 antiwar comedy Idiot's Delight.

== Plot overview ==
The musical is set on New Year's Eve "in the avoidable future" in the grand Alpine Barclay Palace Hotel, where the guests find themselves in the midst of a potential nuclear Armageddon. The characters are American singer Harry Aikens and Cynthia Brookfield-Bailey, who may have had a romantic fling years earlier. Among the others present are Cynthia's current paramour, Henry Kissinger-like diplomat Dr. Josef Winkler, a gay couple, a minister, and a freedom fighter.

== Production ==
After 25 previews, the musical opened on Broadway at the Minskoff Theatre on May 11, 1983, closing after a single performance. Directed by Lerner and choreographed by Billy Wilson, the cast included Len Cariou, Noel Craig, Liz Robertson, George Rose, Don Chastain, Jeff Keller, Brent Barrett, and Alyson Reed. Show business insiders dubbed it "Dance a Little Faster...Close a Little Sooner."

In his New York Times review Frank Rich described it as "a huge, extravagant mishmash...that seems to have taken on a rampaging, self-destructive life of its own," a sentiment similar to those expressed by the other critics.

An original cast recording was released in 1987, on both vinyl and CD.

== Song list ==
Act I

- It Never Would've Worked
- Happy, Happy New Year
- No Man Is Worth It
- What Are You Going to Do About It?
- A Woman Who Thinks I'm Wonderful
- Pas de Deux
- There's Never Been Anything Like Us
- Another Life
- Why Can't the World Go and Leave Us Alone?
- He Always Comes Home to Me
- I Got a New Girl
- Dance a Little Closer
- There's Always One You Can't Forget

Act II

- Homesick
- Mad
- I Don't Know
- Auf Wiedersehen
- I Never Want to See You Again
- On Top of the World
- I Got a New Girl (Reprise)
- Dance a Little Closer (Reprise)
