= Mary Cleere Haran =

American jazz musician

- Born: Mollie Gene Beachboard; May 15, 1952; San Francisco, California, U.S.
- Died: February 5, 2011 (aged 58) Deerfield Beach, Florida, U.S.
- Genre: Jazz
- Occupations: Singer, dancer
- Instrument: vocals

Mary Cleere Haran (May 13, 1952 - February 5, 2011) was an American singer known for her work as a cabaret artist. Her skills in performing popular music and jazz enabled her to entertain audiences with either genre or a combination of the two. A review in the magazine Variety described her as having "an easygoing earthiness that glows in the velvet textures of her voice ..."

== Early years ==
Haran was born in San Francisco, California, one of eight children in an Irish Catholic family. Her father, James Haran, taught English, film and theater at City College of San Francisco. Her mother encouraged Haran to study dancing and violin, but she eventually turned to singing. In her youth, her favorite singers included Ella Fitzgerald, Judy Garland, and Peggy Lee, and their work influenced her style and choice of material as a professional singer. She was also influenced by Depression-era films that she watched in her youth. Later, they provided material as she wove anecdotes about that period with performances of songs of the time.

As a teenager, Haran performed in musicals at the Eureka Theater. While a student at San Francisco State University, she was an English major, which she considered to be a basis for her partiality to lyricists.

== Career ==
In the early- and mid-1970s, Haran performed in local and regional West Coast theatrical productions, including Dangling Desperation or All Strings Attached, Beach Blanket Babylon, The Boys from Syracuse, Company, and Babes in Arms. A newspaper review of a 1975 performance of The Boys from Syracuse noted: "Mary-Cleere Haran was excellent in the role of the Courtesan. Her singing is extremely stylish and were she interested in pursuing a nightclub career, she could probably make a considerable splash almost immediately." She also sang at casinos in Nevada and Texas with The New Deal Rhythm Band. She left that group after being asked to perform more in the style of a 1920s-era flapper, although her tastes ran to more sincere music. Then she moved to New York to perform on stage. Her off-Broadway productions included Heebie Jeebies, Manhattan Music, and Swingtime Canteen. On Broadway (billed as Mary-Cleere Haran), she portrayed Ann Collier in The 1940's Radio Hour (1979). Following that performance, she turned her attention to singing in clubs.

Debuting in New York cabarets in 1985, Haran was "fiercely proud to call herself a cabaret artist". She used the intimacy and directness of cabarets to her advantage as she performed not just a selection of songs but a production whose preparation was equivalent to an off-Broadway show. Will Friedwald, in his book A Biographical Guide to the Great Jazz and Pop Singers, commented, "Ms. Haran always plays herself in one of her one-woman shows, addressing the audience in her dual role as scholar and interpreter of the Great American Songbook." For example, her 2007 show "Mary Cleere Haran Sings Doris Day" mixed Haran's vocalization of songs associated with Day with "anecdotes, cultural history and her own personal reflections" about the singer. Haran did research about each singer and songwriter whose work she performed to find material to supplement his or her featured songs. Her accompaniment usually was no more than a trio of bass, drums, and piano.

On television, Haran wrote and co-produced Doris Day: Sentimental Journey on PBS in addition to contributing her efforts to programs about Bing Crosby, Irving Berlin, and Louis Armstrong. She also appeared as torch singer Lee Ann on 100 Centre Street (2002).

== Personal life ==
Haran was married to, and divorced from, director Chris Silva. She had one son with her second husband, Joe Gilford, a director and writer whom she divorced.

== Death ==
On February 3, 2011, Haran was injured when an automobile hit the bicycle that she was riding. She died two days later in Deerfield Beach, Florida, at age 58 from injuries caused by that collision.

== Discography ==
- There's a Small Hotel: Live at the Algonquin (1992)
- This Heart of Mine: Classic Movie Songs of the Forties (1994)
- This Funny World: Mary Cleere Haran Sings Lyrics by Hart (1995)
- Pennies from Heaven: Movie Songs from the Depression Era (1998)
- The Memory of All That: Gershwin on Broadway and in Hollywood (1999)
- Crazy Rhythm: Manhattan in the '20s (2002)
