= Cris Groenendaal =

American actor and tenor

- Born: February 17, 1948 (age 77)
- Occupation(s): Singer, actor
- Years active: 1976–2002
- Known for: The Phantom of the Opera, Sweeney Todd: The Demon Barber of Fleet Street

Cris Groenendaal is a retired American musical theatre actor. He performed in the original Broadway productions of Sweeney Todd: The Demon Barber of Fleet Street, Sunday in the Park with George, The Phantom of the Opera and Passion, as well as appearing in the original cast of the 1996 Broadway revival of A Funny Thing Happened on the Way to the Forum.

== Training ==
He is a trained operatic tenor. He was trained by fellow tenor Frederick Jagel.

== Career ==
Known for his work in Stephen Sondheim's musicals, he made his Broadway debut in the original cast of Sweeney Todd: The Demon Barber of Fleet Street as an ensemble member and understudy for the role of Anthony. He would later replace Victor Garber in the role of Anthony. He was also in the original cast of the first national tour of Sweeney Todd reprising his role of Anthony. He appeared in the 1982 televised recording of the touring production.

Groenendaal was also in the original Broadway cast of Sunday in the Park with George originating the roles of Billy Webster and Louis while understudying many roles including the titular role. He replaced Robert Westenberg in the roles of a Soldier/Alex and later played the titular roles of Georges Seurat/George for 5 days.

Groenendaal originated the role of Monsieur Gilles André in the original Broadway cast of The Phantom of the Opera also understudying the role of Raoul, Vicomte de Chagny. He would later take over the role of The Phantom from Timothy Nolen in March 1989 on Broadway and was the third principal actor to play the Phantom on Broadway. He was replaced in the role in March 1990 by the original Broadway and West End Raoul, Steve Barton. Groenendaal would later reprise the role of the Phantom in the Canadian production replacing Colm Wilkinson and for two stints in the Canadian tour.

In 1994 and 1996 he would play roles in two Sondheim musicals, the Broadway revival of A Funny Thing Happened on the Way to the Forum and the original Broadway production of Passion, playing Miles Gloriosus and Major Rizzolli respectively.

In 1998, he appears in the first US tour of Ragtime as the Father. This would be his last production before his retirement. However, he made an exception in 2002 to perform in the Sondheim celebration at the Kennedy Center in a production of Sunday in the Park with George as Jules and Bob Greenberg.

== Personal life ==
Groenendaal met his eventual wife, Broadway music director Sue Anderson, when she was performing with the improvisation group Broadway Local. The two moved to Croton-on-Hudson, New York, in 1987, married in 1989, and had two children. The two recorded three albums together.

== Acting credits ==
=== Theatre ===
Year(s)	Production	Role	Notes
1976	1776	Roger Sherman	Regional
1976	My Fair Lady	Jamie / Ensemble	Regional
1976	A Little Night Music	Frid	Regional
1977	Follies	Max Deems / Ensemble	Regional
1977	The Wizard of Oz	The Tin Man / Hickory	Regional
1977	Fiddler on the Roof	Ensemble	Regional
1979	Sweeney Todd: The Demon Barber of Fleet Street	Ensemble u/s Anthony Hope	Original Broadway Production
1979-1980	Sweeney Todd: The Demon Barber of Fleet Street	Anthony Hope	Original Broadway Production
1980	South Pacific	Lt. Joseph Cable, USMC	Regional
1980-1981	Sweeney Todd: The Demon Barber of Fleet Street	Anthony Hope	US National Tour
1984	Sweeney Todd: The Demon Barber of Fleet Street	Anthony Hope	Houston Grand Opera
1984	Sweeney Todd: The Demon Barber of Fleet Street	Anthony Hope	New York City Opera
1984	Sunday in the Park with George	Billy Webster / Louis / A Man Lying on the Bank u/s A Soldier / Alex u/s Franz / Dennis	Original Broadway Production
1984-1985	Sunday in the Park with George	A Soldier / Alex u/s Georges Seurat / George	Original Broadway Production
1985	Sunday in the Park with George	Georges Seurat / George	Original Broadway Production
1985	Sunday in the Park with George	A Soldier / Alex u/s Georges Seurat / George	Original Broadway Production
1987	South Pacific	Lt. Joseph Cable, USMC (Alternate)	New York City Opera
1987	Sweeney Todd: The Demon Barber of Fleet Street	Anthony Hope	New York City Opera
1988	The Phantom of the Opera	Monsieur Gilles André u/s Raoul, Vicomte de Chagny	Original Broadway Production
1988-1989	The Phantom of the Opera	Monsieur Gilles André u/s The Phantom of the Opera u/s Raoul, Vicomte de Chagny	Original Broadway Production
1989-1990	The Phantom of the Opera	The Phantom of the Opera	Original Broadway Production
1992	The Phantom of the Opera	The Phantom of the Opera	Canadian National Tour
1992	Carousel	Enoch Snow	Regional
1993-1994	The Phantom of the Opera	The Phantom of the Opera	Canadian National Tour
1994	Passion	Major Rizzolli	Original Broadway Production
1994-1995	The Phantom of the Opera	The Phantom of the Opera	Canadian Production
1996-1998	A Funny Thing Happened on the Way to the Forum	Miles Gloriosus	Second Broadway Revival
1998-1999	Ragtime	Father	US National Tour
2002	Sunday in the Park with George	Jules / Bob Greenberg	Kennedy Center

=== Filmography ===
Year(s)	Production	Role	Notes
1980	The Doctors	Dr. Harrow	3 episodes
1982	Great Performances	Anthony Hope	Episode: Sweeney Todd: The Demon Barber of Fleet Street
1986	American Playhouse	Louis / Billy Webster	Episode: Sunday in the Park with George
1995	Pocahontas	Chorus	Animated film
