= Johanna (character) =

Johanna Oakley
- Jayne Wisener as Johanna
- Portrayed by: Sarah Rice (original 1979 Broadway cast); Betsy Joslyn (1982 tour); Lisa Vroman (2001 concert); Lauren Molina (2005 Broadway revival); Lauren Molina (2007-2008 Canada and U.S. National Tour); Jayne Wisener (2007 film); Maria Bilbao (2023 Broadway)

In-universe information
- Gender: Female
- Spouses: Anthony Hope (1979 Sondheim musical and 2007 Tim Burton musical adaptation) Mark Ingestrie (Original story)

Johanna is a fictional character appearing in the story of Sweeney Todd. In the original version of the tale, the penny dreadful The String of Pearls (1846–7), her name is Johanna Oakley and she has no relation to Todd. In the popular musical adaptation by Stephen Sondheim, inspired by Christopher Bond's play Sweeney Todd, the Demon Barber of Fleet Street (1973), she is the daughter of Benjamin Barker and his wife, Lucy. In this version she is the ward of Judge Turpin, the man who falsely convicted her father and raped her mother.

== In The String of Pearls ==
In The String of Pearls Johanna Oakley is the lover of a sailor named Mark Ingestrie, who seems to have gone missing at sea. One of his shipmates, Lieutenant Thornhill, comes to London with this sad news and also brings a gift of a string of pearls for Johanna from Mark. Thornhill, himself, however, also goes missing - last seen entering Sweeney Todd's establishment. One of Thornhill's seafaring friends, Colonel Jeffery, is alerted to the disappearance of Thornhill by the latter's faithful dog, Hector, and investigates his whereabouts. He is joined by Johanna who wants to know what happened to her lover, Mark Ingestrie. Johanna's suspicions of Sweeney Todd's involvement lead her to the desperate and dangerous expedient of dressing up as a boy and entering Todd's employment, after his last assistant, Tobias Ragg, has been incarcerated in a madhouse. Soon the full grisly horror of Todd's activities are discovered and the dismembered remains of hundreds of his victims found in the crypt underneath St Dunstan's church. Meanwhile it is discovered that Johanna's lover, Mark Ingestrie, is not dead, but has come to London in reduced circumstances and has been imprisoned in the cellars beneath Mrs. Lovett's pie shop and put to work as the cook. Threatened with being killed and made into a meat-pie himself, he eventually escapes and makes the startling announcement to customers that "Mrs Lovett's pies are made of human flesh!". Mark then marries Johanna and they live happily ever after.

== In Sondheim's Sweeney Todd ==
In Stephen Sondheim's musical, Sweeney Todd: The Demon Barber of Fleet Street, after Benjamin Barker is sent away to Australia, and Lucy raped and driven insane, Judge Turpin takes their daughter Johanna as his ward, raising her as his own. He keeps her in her chamber at his estate like a prisoner, with her only connection to the outside world being her window. Judge Turpin plans to make Johanna his wife; the idea repulses her, and she rejects him.

Anthony Hope falls in love with her at first sight and vows to rescue her from her containment. Judge Turpin discovers her plot to escape and sends her to Fogg's Asylum for the mentally deranged. She is rescued by Anthony, posing as a wig maker's apprentice. During the escape, she is forced to kill Fogg, the Asylum owner, when Anthony cannot bring himself to do so. Disguised as a sailor, she is taken to Sweeney Todd's barber shop, where he has been longing to see her. When an insane beggar woman (later revealed to be her mother) pursues her in the upper room, Johanna hides herself in a large trunk. From there she presumably witnesses Todd's murders of the Beggar Woman and the Judge. She is nearly murdered by her father when he discovers her, as he does not recognize her as his daughter (seeing as he had never met her since infancy and because she is disguised as a young man). She survives when Mrs. Lovett screams in the basement bakehouse, distracting Todd and allowing her to escape. In the final scene, Johanna, Anthony and two policemen encounter Toby in the bakehouse, mindlessly turning the meat grinder, surrounded by the corpses of Todd, Lucy, Mrs. Lovett, and Turpin. Presumably she elopes with Anthony after the events of the show.

Much of Johanna's dialogue and lyrics subtly reflect that she may be suffering from living under lock and key, confined by the surveillance of an oppressive and more powerful party. During the song Kiss Me, for example, she repeatedly interrupts Anthony's plans for elopement, believing that she has heard the Judge returning home, before calming and embracing him. This more confined portrayal of her character differs from the earlier The String of Pearls version, in which she is offered more autonomy and a perhaps more assertive or adventurous control over her destiny by dressing as a boy.

In Tim Burton's 2007 film adaptation, much of Johanna's music is cut out including the Kiss Me sequence and her part in the second act Quartet. She has little dialogue, reducing her part to a nearly silent role. After being rescued from the asylum by Anthony, she does not kill Fogg, but instead leaves him to be savagely torn apart by the screeching horde of deranged female inmates with Anthony's consent. Considering that cannibalism is a central theme in the film, the emaciated, unkempt and agitated appearance of the female inmates in Fogg’s presence foreshadows the manner of his grisly death at their hands. The ending is changed slightly: instead of her running out of the Barber Shop, Todd, hearing Mrs. Lovett scream, deliberately lets her go (still without recognizing her) asking her to forget his face. He leaves her sitting in the barber chair, after which she is not seen again, leaving it unclear if she reunites with Anthony, as the film also suggests that Johanna finds the idea of eloping with Anthony to be a naive solution to her traumatic upbringing.

In this version Johanna is sixteen years old. In "Poor Thing", Mrs Lovett describes Johanna as the "year-old kid", which, added to the fifteen years Sweeney has spent in Australia, makes her sixteen.

== Performers ==
- Eve Lister played the role - billed as "Johanna Oakley" - in the 1936 film adaptation.

=== Musical performers ===
- Sarah Rice played Johanna in the original Broadway production.
- Mandy More played Johanna in the 1980 London Production.
- Betsy Joslyn portrayed her in the filmed version of the 1982 tour.
- Celia Keenan-Bolger played Johanna in the 2004 Production at the Kennedy Center.
- Lauren Molina in the 2005 John Doyle revival, and in the 2007-2008 John Doyle revival international tour.
- Jayne Wisener played Johanna in the 2007 film adaptation directed by Tim Burton.
- Cassie Skinner in the 2009 Production at the Roleystone Theatre, Perth, Western Australia.
- Lucy May Barker in the 2012 revival at the Adelphi Theatre, London
- Erin Mackey in the 2014 New York Philharmonic production.
- Sydney M. Hallett in the 2020 St. Thomas Musical Theatre (NB, CA) production.
- Maria Bilbao in the 2023 Broadway revival.

=== Songs ===
In the musical Johanna sings only one song by herself. The tracks were all composed by Stephen Sondheim. These include:

- "The Ballad of Sweeney Todd (Prologue)" (with Company)**
- "Green Finch & Linnet Bird"*
- "Ah, Miss" (with Anthony and Beggar Woman)**
- "Kiss Me (Part I)" (with Anthony)**
- "Kiss Me (Part II/Quartet)" (with Anthony, Beadle Bamford and Judge Turpin)**
- "Johanna (Quartet)" (with Anthony, Todd and Beggar Woman)**
- "City on Fire/Searching" (with Company, Anthony / Todd, Mrs. Lovett and Beggar Woman)**
- "Ah, Miss (Reprise)" (with Anthony)**
- "The Ballad of Sweeney Todd (Epilogue)" (with Company)**

(* Edited for 2007 film)
(** Cut from 2007 film)
