= George Hearn =

American actor & singer (born 1934)

- Born: June 18, 1934 (age 92); St. Louis, Missouri, U.S.
- Occupations: Actor, singer
- Years active: 1963–present
- Known for: Sweeney Todd: The Demon Barber of Fleet Street, La Cage aux Folles, Sunset Boulevard
- Spouses: Mary Harrell (m. 1957; div. 1962) Susan Babel (m. 1965; div. 1973) Dixie Carter (m. 1977; div. 1979) Betsy Joslyn (m. 1979; div. 1984) Leslie Simons (m. 1985; died 2026)
- Children: 3
- Awards: 2x Tony Award winner Emmy Award winner Drama Desk Award winner

George Hearn (born June 18, 1934) is an American actor and bass-baritone singer, primarily in Broadway musical theatre.

Some of his Broadway credits include Albin in La Cage aux Folles, the title role in Sweeney Todd: The Demon Barber of Fleet Street, Max von Mayerling in Sunset Boulevard, John Dickinson in 1776, Mr. Otto Frank in The Diary of Anne Frank, and The Wonderful Wizard of Oz in Wicked.

For his work, he won two Tony Awards for La Cage aux Folles and Sunset Boulevard. As well as being nominated for three others. He also was nominated for an Laurence Olivier Award for La Cage aux Folles and won an Emmy Award for Sweeney Todd: The Demon Barber of Fleet Street.

== Early years ==
Born in St. Louis, Missouri, Hearn studied philosophy at Southwestern at Memphis, now Rhodes College before he embarked on a career in the theater, training for the stage with actress turned acting coach Irene Dailey. Most of Hearn's early performances were in traditional productions at the New York Shakespeare Festival and theaters at Lincoln Center.

== Career ==
Hearn's career began in 1963 when he played Sir Dinidan in a national tour of Camelot with Biff McGuire and Jeannie Carson, standing by for McGuire, who played King Arthur. He first garnered a notice as John Dickinson in the acclaimed 1969 musical 1776 and as Liv Ullmann's leading man in the musical version of I Remember Mama (1979).

On March 4, 1980, he replaced Len Cariou in the title role of Stephen Sondheim's Sweeney Todd opposite Dorothy Loudon. Later in 1980 Hearn and the show's original star, Angela Lansbury, headed the show's touring company, then reprised their roles for a Showtime production of the musical, which won him an Emmy Award for his portrayal.

In 1983 Hearn created the role of Albin in the original Broadway production of La Cage aux Folles written by Harvey Fierstein and Jerry Herman. Hearn originated the gay anthem "I Am What I Am". He won the Tony Award, Drama Desk Award and Outer Critics' Circle Award for Best Actor in a Musical for his portrayal of Albin. Hearn also appeared in the West End production (which opened in May 1986).

In 1985, Hearn starred as Long John Silver in an Edmonton production of Pieces of Eight, a musical adaptation of Treasure Island. Despite its credentials, including a new score by composer Jule Styne, it never was staged again.

Hearn and Lansbury remained friends, and the actress invited him to guest star on several episodes of her CBS sleuth series Murder, She Wrote in the early 1990s.

He won a second Tony award for his role as Max Von Mayerling in the original Broadway production of Sunset Boulevard.

On July 20, 2004, Hearn returned to Broadway for the first time in four years, starring as the Wizard in the Broadway musical Wicked, remaining until May 29, 2005. Hearn later returned to the musical for a limited two-week engagement from January 17 through February 1, 2006.

In 2008 he starred in a production of The Visit by John Kander and Fred Ebb alongside Chita Rivera at the Signature Theatre in Arlington, Virginia. The Visit opened to positive reviews on May 13, 2008, and closed June 22, 2008.

Hearn's recordings include Sunset Boulevard (1994 Los Angeles Cast, and later the Broadway Cast Recording), Sweeney Todd Live at the New York Philharmonic, Mack & Mabel (1988 London Concert Cast), I Remember Mama (1985 Studio Cast), Follies in Concert (1985 Live Performance), and A Stephen Sondheim Evening (1983 Concert Cast).

Hearn was inducted into the American Theater Hall of Fame on January 29, 2007.

== Personal life ==
Hearn's spouses include Susan Babel, Mary Harrell, with whom he had one son, actress Dixie Carter, Sweeney Todd co-star Betsy Joslyn, and later Leslie Simons, a dancer he met while working on La Cage aux Folles. Hearn and Simons had two sons together before her death in July 2026. He currently resides in Essex, New York.

== Filmography ==
=== Film ===
| Year | Title | Role | Notes |
|---|---|---|---|
| 1989 | See You in the Morning | Martin | |
| 1992 | Sneakers | Gregor Ivanovich | |
| 1993 | The Vanishing | Arthur Bernard | |
| 1994 | The Pagemaster | Captain Ahab | Voice |
| 1996 | All Dogs Go to Heaven 2 | Red | Voice |
| 1997 | The Devil's Own | Peter Fitzsimmons | |
| 1998 | Barney's Great Adventure | Grandpa Greenfield | |
| 2006 | Flags of Our Fathers | Elderly Walter Gust | |

=== Television ===
| Year | Title | Role | Notes |
|---|---|---|---|
| 1975 | The Silence | Captain Nichols | TV movie |
| 1976 | The Adams Chronicles | Henry Clay | Miniseries |
| 1976 | Sea Marks | Colm Primrose | TV movie |
| 1979 | Sanctuary of Fear | Monsignor Kerrigan | TV movie |
| 1982 | A Piano for Mrs. Cimino | George Cimino | TV movie |
| 1982 | Great Performances | Sweeney Todd | Episode: Sweeney Todd: The Demon Barber of Fleet Street |
| 1985 | The Equalizer | Senator Blanding | Episode: "The Equalizer" |
| 1990 | The Young Riders | Elijah Quinn | Episode: "Blood Moon" |
| 1990 | LA Law | Dr. Westbrook | Episode: "God Rest Ye Murray Gentlemen" |
| 1990–1992 | Murder She Wrote | Elliott Von Stuben/Sean Culhane | 3 episodes |
| 1991 | Star Trek: The Next Generation | Dr. Berel | Episode: "First Contact" |
| 1991 | The Golden Girls | Frank Nann | Episode: "Henny Penny, Straight No Chaser" |
| 1991 | Fire in the Dark | Arthur | TV movie |
| 1991 | False Arrest | Prosecutor | TV movie |
| 1992 | Fish Police | W.K. the Weenie King | Voice, Episode: "Beauty's Only Fin Deep" |
| 1992 | Tom & Jerry Kids Show | Additional Voice | Voice, Episode: "Penthouse Mouse/12 Angry Sheep/The Ant Attack" |
| 1993 | Jonny's Golden Quest | President | Voice, TV movie |
| 1993 | Cheers | George | Episode: "Rebecca Gaines, Rebecca Loses" |
| 1993 | Captain Planet and the Planeteers | Mr. Wheeler | Voice, 2 episodes |
| 1993–1994 | SWAT Kats: The Radical Squadron | Professor Hackle | Voice, 4 episodes |
| 1994 | Garfield and Friends | Mr. Block | Voice, Episode: "The Man Who Hated Cats/Deja Vu/Canned Laughter" |
| 1995 | Annie: A Royal Adventure! | Oliver "Daddy" Warbucks | TV movie |
| 1995 | Daisy-Head Mayzie | The Mayor | Voice, TV special |
| 1999 | Law & Order | Independent Counsel William Dell | Episode: "Sideshow" |
| 1999 | Sarah, Plain and Tall: Winter's End | Dr. Hartley | TV movie |
| 2001 | Law & Order: Special Victims Unit | Charles Southerland | Episode: "Repression" |
| 2001 | Sweeney Todd in Concert | Sweeney Todd | TV movie |

=== Stage ===
| Year | Title | Role | Notes |
|---|---|---|---|
| 1963 | Camelot | Sir Dinadan u/s King Arthur u/s Merlyn | US National Tour |
| 1966 | A Time for Singing | Ianto Morgan | Broadway |
| 1968 | Henry IV, Part 1 | Poins | Delacorte Theater |
| 1969–1972 | 1776 | John Dickinson | Broadway & US National Tour |
| 1973 | The Changing Room | Trevor | Broadway |
| 1975 | Hamlet | Horatio | Broadway |
| 1977 | An Almost Perfect Person | Dan Michael Connally | Broadway |
| 1979 | I Remember Mama | Papa | Broadway |
| 1980 | Watch on the Rhine | Kurt Muller | Broadway |
| 1980–1981 | Sweeney Todd: The Demon Barber of Fleet Street | Sweeney Todd | Broadway & US National Tour |
| 1982 | A Doll's Life | Actor, Torvald Helmer, Johan Blecker | Broadway |
| 1982 | Whodunnit | Andreas Capodistriou | Broadway |
| 1983–1987 | La Cage aux Folles | Albin Mougeotte | Broadway & West End |
| 1985 | Follies | Benjamin Stone | Lincoln Center |
| 1988 | The Chosen | Reb Saunders | |
| 1988 | Ah, Wilderness! | Sid Davis | Broadway |
| 1989 | Love Letters | Andrew Makepeace Ladd III | |
| 1989 | Ghetto | Jacob Gens | Broadway |
| 1989–1990 | Meet Me in St. Louis | Alonzo Smith | Broadway |
| 1992 | Sweeney Todd: The Demon Barber of Fleet Street | Sweeney Todd | Paper Mill Playhouse |
| 1993–1997 | Sunset Boulevard | Max von Mayerling | Broadway & US National Tour |
| 1997–1998 | The Diary of Anne Frank | Otto Frank | Broadway |
| 1999–2000 | Putting It Together | The Husband | |
| 2000 | Sweeney Todd: The Demon Barber of Fleet Street | Sweeney Todd | Concert |
| 2000 | South Pacific | Emile de Becque | Concert |
| 2001 | Sweeney Todd: The Demon Barber of Fleet Street | Sweeney Todd | Concert |
| 2002 | A Little Night Music | Fredrik Egerman | Ravinia Festival |
| 2004–2006 | Wicked | The Wonderful Wizard of Oz | Broadway |
| 2008 | The Visit | Anton Schell | Signature Theatre, Arlington, VA |
| 2009 | Camelot | King Arthur | Ravinia Festival |
| 2010 | Annie Get Your Gun | Buffalo Bill | Ravinia Festival |
| 2010–2011 | Dracula | Abraham Van Helsing | |
| 2012 | Scandalous | James Kennedy, Brother Bob | Broadway |

== Awards and nominations ==
| Year | Award | Category | Work | Result |
|---|---|---|---|---|
| 1980 | Tony Awards | Best Performance by a Featured Actor in a Play | Watch on the Rhine | Nominated |
| 1983 | Tony Awards | Best Performance by a Leading Actor in a Musical | A Doll's Life | Nominated |
| 1983 | CableACE Awards | Actor in a Theatrical or Musical Program | Sweeney Todd: The Demon Barber of Fleet Street | Won |
| 1984 | Tony Awards | Best Performance by a Leading Actor in a Musical | La Cage aux Folles | Won |
| 1984 | Drama Desk Awards | Outstanding Actor in a Musical | La Cage aux Folles | Won |
| 1984 | Outer Critics Circle Awards | Outstanding Actor in a Musical | La Cage aux Folles | Won |
| 1985 | Primetime Emmy Awards | Outstanding Individual Performance in a Variety or Music Program | Sweeney Todd: The Demon Barber of Fleet Street | Won |
| 1986 | Laurence Olivier Awards | Outstanding Performance of the Year by an Actor in a Musical | La Cage aux Folles | Nominated |
| 1995 | Tony Awards | Best Performance by a Featured Actor in a Musical | Sunset Boulevard | Won |
| 1995 | Drama Desk Awards | Outstanding Actor in a Musical | Sunset Boulevard | Nominated |
| 2000 | Tony Awards | Best Performance by a Leading Actor in a Musical | Putting It Together | Nominated |
