= Betsy Joslyn =

American actress

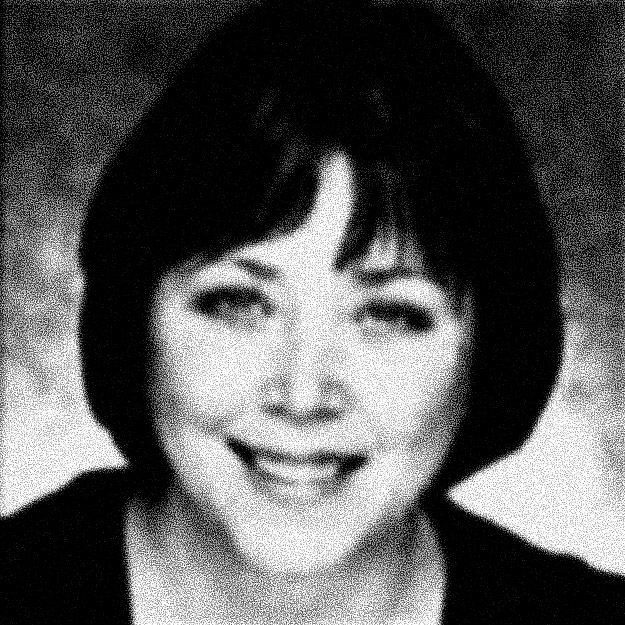
- Born: Elizabeth Anne Joslyn; April 19, 1954 (age 72); Staten Island, New York, U.S.
- Education: St. Joseph Hill Elementary School; St. Joseph Hill Academy; Wagner College
- Occupations: Stage, film, television actress

Elizabeth Anne "Betsy" Joslyn (born April 19, 1954) is a former Broadway musical and dramatic actress and soprano. Joslyn is best known for her Broadway work, including the original 1979 production of Sweeney Todd. She appeared in the ensemble of the original Broadway production and eventually took over the ingenue role of Johanna after Sarah Rice.

== Biography ==
Born on April 19, 1954 in Staten Island, New York, Joslyn is one of two children born to Marielouise (née Sidham) and Frederic Marshall Joslyn.She attended St. Joseph Hill Elementary School, St. Joseph Hill Academy, and Wagner College, where she studied with Lowell Matson, graduating cum laude with a Bachelor of Arts in 1975.

In 1998, Joslyn planned to marry conductor Mark Mitchell.

== Broadway credits ==
- 1979–82: Sweeney Todd – Ensemble & Understudy Johanna, later Johanna (1979, Broadway); Johanna (1980–81, National Tour; September 12, 1982, television production)
- 1982: A Doll's Life – Nora
- 1984-85: Sunday in the Park with George – Standby for Dot/Marie, later Celeste #2/Waitress, then Dot/Marie
- 1988: Into the Woods – Understudy for the Witch & Cinderella, later The Witch (from July 5 to December)
- 1989: A Few Good Men – Lt. Cmdr. Joanne Galloway
- 1993: The Goodbye Girl – Paula
- 1998: High Society – Patsy
- 2000: Les Misérables – Madame Thénardier (starting July 24)

== Off Broadway credits ==
- 1975: The Fantasticks – Luisa
- 1990: Light Up the Sky – Frances Black (Roundabout Theatre)
- 1991: Colette Collage – Colette
- 1991: Cabaret Verboten – Revue (CSC Repertory Theatre)

== Major touring credits ==
- 1980–81: Sweeney Todd – Johanna (National Tour)
- 1984: Camelot – Guenevere
- 1989: Into the Woods – Witch (May, National Tour)
- 1992: City of Angels – Oolie/Donna
- 1996–97: Beauty and the Beast – Mrs. Potts
