= Life Just Is =

- Life Just Is Poster, designed by Soledad del Real
- Directed by: Alex Barrett
- Written by: Alex Barrett
- Produced by: Tom Stuart
- Starring: Will De Meo; Jack Gordan; Nathaniel Martello-White; Fiona Ryan; Jayne Wisener; Paul Nicholls
- Cinematography: Yosuke Kato
- Edited by: Murat Kebir
- Production companies: Asalva; Patchwork Productions; Stanley Road Productions
- Release dates: 23 June 2012 (Edinburgh Film Festival); 7 December 2012 (UK limited); 21 April 2013 (Arizona International Film Festival)
- Running time: 102 minutes
- Country: United Kingdom
- Language: English

Life Just Is is a 2012 British independent drama film written and directed by Alex Barrett and starring Will De Meo, Jack Gordon, Nathaniel Martello-White, Fiona Ryan, Jayne Wisener and Paul Nicholls.

== Plot ==
Life Just Is tells the story of Pete, Tom, Claire, David and Jay who are university graduates having trouble making the move into adult life. Amongst the hanging out and their daily routines simmers Pete's desire to find a spiritual answer to life's meaning, Jay's desperate need not to get hurt again and Tom and Claire's ever increasing mutual attraction.

== Cast ==
- Will De Meo as David
- Jack Gordon as Pete
- Nathaniel Martello-White as Tom
- Fiona Ryan as Claire
- Jayne Wisener as Jay
- Paul Nicholls as Bobby
- Rachel Bright as Anna
- Jason Croot as Walahfrid
- Vanessa Govinden as Michelle
- Andrew Hawley as Nick
- Lachlan McCall as Lawrence
- Joshua Osei as Vince
- Niall Phillips as Ollie
- Alix Wilton Regan as Zoe
- Gillian Wisener as Beth

== Themes ==
Through its examination of the lives of a group of young adults in today's society, Life Just Is explores a number of contemporary themes concerning life after university and finding one's place in life. More specifically, the film looks at the existential clash between desire and fear and the ways in which the latter prevents people from achieving the former. The film also examines attitudes towards religion and the standoff between religious ideas and modern values.

== Soundtrack ==
Life Just Is features no original score and no non-diegetic music on its soundtrack, instead containing only music listened to by the characters themselves. In addition to the tracks featured in the film, there are also several moments when the characters sing songs. In one scene, the character David performs "Geordie in Wonderland" by The Wildhearts, and two of the other songs he sings are originally by bands featuring ex-Wildhearts members: "Lemonade Girl" by The Jellys and "Moving Along" by Plan A.

In November 2011, the complete soundtrack listing was unveiled on the film's blog, revealing that the film also features songs by Emma McGlynn, The Lustjunks, The Heart Strings, Deckard, Nate Seacourt, The High Wire and Animal Kingdom.

== Marketing ==
Since the very early stages of production, the team behind the film have been posting comprehensive updates on the project's blog, with the intention of being as open and as informative as possible about their creative process and experiences. In the run up to the shoot, the documenting expanded to include video updates posted on both the film's blog and its YouTube channel. During the shoot, actress Jayne Wisener created a series of popular video diaries.

After the shoot, the production launched an international competition to design their poster. An overwhelming success, the competition (aimed predominately at students) attracted over 100 entries from 23 different institutions based in eight countries spread over four continents. The entries were simultaneously shortlisted by a panel of industry experts and a public vote run on the film's Facebook page. On 28 February 2011 Soledad del Real was announced as the winner, as decided by the film's director and producers. All of the entries were later collated into an ebook given away for free on the film's website.

From September 2009 to May 2011, the team behind the film also ran a popular networking and screening night entitled 'Life's Just Networking' at The Duchess pub in Battersea, London. They continue to run occasional events under their 'Life's Just Events' banner.

== Reception ==
The film received mixed reviews upon release. It currently holds a 31% 'rotten' critical score on Rotten Tomatoes based on 13 reviews.

It has been described as "gogglingly boring and appallingly acted" by Catherine Shoard of The Guardian, "a British twist on the mumblecore genre" by Amber Wilkinson of Eye for Film and "unimaginative and quite frankly dull" by Jennifer Tate of ViewLondon. Tim Robey of The Daily Telegraph was more positive, awarding the film three out of five stars and calling it a "Thoughtful, affable, unfashionably angsty shoestring debut about young Londoners figuring stuff out in their post-college years". Robey also noted that "The young cast shine". David Parkinson of Empire Magazine also awarded the film three out of five stars, stating that "Writer/director Barrett delivers a promising debut that pitches four believable characters into the euphoria and dismay of post-uni life". The film critic Brad Stevens went even further in his praise, writing that "In his first feature, Barrett has already acquired the skill to know exactly where to position his camera in order to suggest a view on the material without ever imposing such a view artificially... It may be a cliché, but Barrett's key influences clearly come not from art but rather from life, from the generosity and curiosity with which he has observed both his contemporaries and himself...It is tempting to describe LIFE JUST IS as one of the most promising debuts in contemporary cinema, but this temptation should be resisted. We are not dealing with promise here: we are dealing with achievement".

Several reviewers noted the influence of Ingmar Bergman and Carl Th. Dreyer upon the film. Anton Bitel of Little White Lies wrote "writer/director Alex Barrett's feature debut settles for rites-of-passage ensemble drama in a Bergman mould, but its stilted, awkward dialogue hardly improves upon the audible lines of the film-within-a-film critiqued in that opening scene." Meanwhile, Mark Kermode of The Observer wrote that the film "deserves credit for looking beyond the boundaries of the usual cash-strapped youth fare, and for daring to be more Carl Dreyer than Danny Dyer", and also made the film DVD of the Week.
