= Sweeney Todd: The Demon Barber of Fleet Street (2007 film) =

2007 film by Tim Burton

- American theatrical release poster
- Directed by: Tim Burton
- Screenplay by: John Logan
- Based on: Sweeney Todd: The Demon Barber of Fleet Street by Stephen Sondheim and Hugh Wheeler; Sweeney Todd 1970 play by Christopher Bond
- Produced by: Richard D. Zanuck; Walter F. Parkes; Laurie MacDonald; John Logan
- Starring: Johnny Depp; Helena Bonham Carter; Alan Rickman; Timothy Spall; Sacha Baron Cohen
- Cinematography: Dariusz Wolski
- Edited by: Chris Lebenzon
- Music by: Stephen Sondheim
- Production companies: DreamWorks Pictures; Warner Bros. Pictures; Parkes/MacDonald Productions; The Zanuck Company
- Distributed by: Paramount Pictures (North America); Warner Bros. Pictures (International)
- Release dates: 3 December 2007 (Ziegfeld Theater); 21 December 2007 (United States); 25 January 2008 (United Kingdom)
- Running time: 116 minutes
- Countries: United Kingdom; United States
- Language: English
- Budget: $50 million
- Box office: $153 million

Sweeney Todd: The Demon Barber of Fleet Street is a 2007 Gothic musical slasher film directed by Tim Burton from a screenplay by John Logan, based on the stage musical of the same name by Stephen Sondheim and Hugh Wheeler, which in turn is based on the 1970 play Sweeney Todd by Christopher Bond. The film retells the melodramatic Victorian tale of Sweeney Todd (Johnny Depp), an English barber and serial killer. After arriving in London, Todd seeks revenge on Judge Turpin (Alan Rickman) who wrongfully convicted and exiled him in order to steal his wife. Sweeney Todd murders his customers and, with the help of his accomplice, Mrs. Lovett (Helena Bonham Carter), processes their corpses into meat pies. The film marks the first collaboration between Depp, Bonham Carter, Rickman, Spall, and Baron Cohen (the second being Alice Through the Looking Glass in 2016).

Having been struck by the cinematic qualities of the stage musical while a college student, Burton had entertained the notion of a film version since the early 1980s. However, it was not until 2006 that he had the opportunity to realize this ambition, when DreamWorks Pictures announced his appointment as replacement for director Sam Mendes. Sondheim, although not directly involved, was extensively consulted during production. Depp, not known for his singing, took lessons in preparation for his role, which producer Richard D. Zanuck acknowledged was something of a gamble.

Sweeney Todd: The Demon Barber of Fleet Street had its premiere at the Ziegfeld Theater in New York City on 3 December 2007, and was released in the United States on 21 December 2007 by Paramount Pictures and in the United Kingdom on 25 January 2008 by Warner Bros. Pictures. The film received critical acclaim, and was praised for the performances of the cast, musical numbers, costume and set design, and faithfulness to the musical. It grossed over $153 million against a production budget of $50 million. Since its release, the film has been widely assessed as one of the greatest musical films of the 21st century. (Note: Attributed to multiple references:)

== Plot ==
In 1846, Benjamin Barker, a barber, arrives in London, accompanied by young sailor Anthony Hope. A flashback reveals that sixteen years prior, Benjamin was falsely convicted and exiled to Australia by the corrupt Judge Turpin, who lusted after Benjamin's wife, Lucy ("No Place Like London"). Benjamin adopts the alias "Sweeney Todd" and returns to his old barber shop on Fleet Street, situated above Nellie Lovett's failing meat pie shop ("The Worst Pies in London"). Recognising Benjamin, Mrs. Lovett tells him that once he was exiled, Turpin raped Lucy at a masquerade ball in his home and drove her to suicide before adopting the couple's daughter, Johanna, as his ward ("Poor Thing"). Todd vows revenge and re-opens his barbershop after Mrs. Lovett, who is unrequitedly in love with him, presents him with his old straight razors ("My Friends").

Anthony becomes enamored with Johanna after seeing her sing by a window above the street ("Green Finch and Linnet Bird"). A beggar woman warns him about Judge Turpin ("Alms! Alms!"), who invites Anthony into his house before setting his henchman and personal bailiff, Beadle Bamford, upon him. The Beadle throws Anthony into the street and beats him with a cane, but Anthony vows to return and rescue Johanna ("Johanna").

Rival barber and snake oil salesman Adolfo Pirelli is publicly humiliated by Todd at a shaving contest in front of Bamford ("Pirelli's Miracle Elixir/The Contest"). At his barbershop, Todd is distressed that Turpin has not yet arrived after The Beadle promised he would visit before the end of the week. Mrs. Lovett encourages him to calm down and come up with a plan ("Wait").

Pirelli visits Todd and reveals that he recognized him by his distinctive straight razors, and attempts to blackmail Todd using the knowledge of his former identity. Todd panics and kills Pirelli, hiding his body in a chest. Mrs. Lovett is shocked but accepts Todd's justifications, having grown emotionally attached to Pirelli's downtrodden assistant Tobias "Toby" Ragg, whom she adopts as a son.

Intent on marrying Johanna, Judge Turpin visits Todd's shop for a shave at Bamford's recommendation ("Ladies in their Sensitivities"). They sing a duet ("Pretty Women") but before Todd can kill Turpin, Anthony bursts in and inadvertently reveals his intentions on eloping with Johanna. Judge Turpin angrily storms out and has Johanna committed to an asylum, offering her her freedom in exchange for her hand in marriage. Todd laments that Johanna is gone forever, and vows revenge on all of London for wronging him ("Epiphany").

Trying to figure out what to do with Pirelli's corpse, Mrs. Lovett suggests that they bake him in a pie. Todd and Mrs. Lovett decide that Todd will kill his customers and Mrs. Lovett will bake their bodies into meat pies to feed to the public ("A Little Priest"). Todd rigs his barber chair with a mechanism to drop his victims' corpses through a trapdoor and into her basement bakery, where she bakes them into pies. Meanwhile, Anthony continues to search for Johanna, Todd laments his missing daughter, and the beggar woman tries to warn the public about Mrs. Lovett's pies ("Johanna – Reprise").

With both their businesses prospering and customers raving about the pies while unaware of their contents ("God, That's Good!"), Mrs. Lovett tells an uninterested Todd of her hopes to marry him and retire ("By the Sea"). Anthony poses as a wig maker in order to rescue Johanna from the asylum, planning on hiding her in Todd's barbershop. Toby becomes wary of Todd and tells Mrs. Lovett of his suspicions, vowing to protect her ("Not While I'm Around"). After he discovers Pirelli's purse in her possession, Mrs. Lovett locks him in the basement and intends on killing him.

The Beadle arrives to inspect reports of the stench from the chimney, but is tricked and murdered by Todd. Toby finds a toe in a pie in the basement, then finds the piles of butchered corpses and, finally, witnesses the Beadle's body fall through the trapdoor into the basement. Mrs. Lovett informs Todd of Toby's suspicions and the pair search for the boy after he escapes into the sewers. Meanwhile, Anthony brings Johanna, disguised as a boy, into the shop and has her wait there while he leaves to find Todd.

The beggar woman enters the shop looking for Bamford and Johanna hides in the chest. The woman recognizes Todd, but upon hearing Turpin approaching, Todd kills her and drops her through the trapdoor. Todd explains to Turpin that Johanna had repented and is returning back to him, offering a free shave in the meantime. Todd reveals himself as Benjamin Barker, before slashing Turpin's throat and dropping him into the basement.

Todd discovers Johanna but does not recognize her, preparing to kill her as well. Meanwhile, the dying Judge Turpin clutches at Mrs. Lovett's dress, causing her to scream and distract Todd; he allows Johanna to flee the shop and hurries to the bakehouse to finish Turpin off. He then recognizes the beggar woman as his wife Lucy and Mrs. Lovett admits that she lied to him about her suicide. He feigns forgiveness and they waltz together, before he kills her by throwing her into the oven. Toby emerges from the sewer and grabs Todd's razor as the latter mourns Lucy. Todd allows Toby to slit his throat, and Toby walks away as Todd bleeds to his death in the basement, holding Lucy's body ("Finale").

== Cast ==
- Johnny Depp as Benjamin Barker / Sweeney Todd, a vengeful barber who sought to make Judge Turpin pay for destroying his life
- Helena Bonham Carter as Nellie Lovett, the owner of the worst meat pie shop in London
- Alan Rickman as Judge Turpin, a corrupt judge who framed Benjamin Barker in order to steal away his wife
- Timothy Spall as Beadle Bamford, Turpin's personal bailiff
- Sacha Baron Cohen as Adolfo Pirelli, a barber and snake oil salesman who was once Barker's protégé
- Jamie Campbell Bower as Anthony Hope, a young sailor who accompanied Barker back to England via ship
- Laura Michelle Kelly as Lucy Barker / Beggar Woman, Benjamin's wife
- Jayne Wisener as Johanna Barker, Benjamin and Lucy's daughter and Turpin's ward
- Ed Sanders as Tobias "Toby" Ragg, Pirelli's apprentice, later taken in by Sweeney and Lovett
- Anthony Head as Gentleman in street
- Laura Meakin as Asylum Patient
- Philip Philmar as Mr. Fogg

== Production ==
=== Development ===
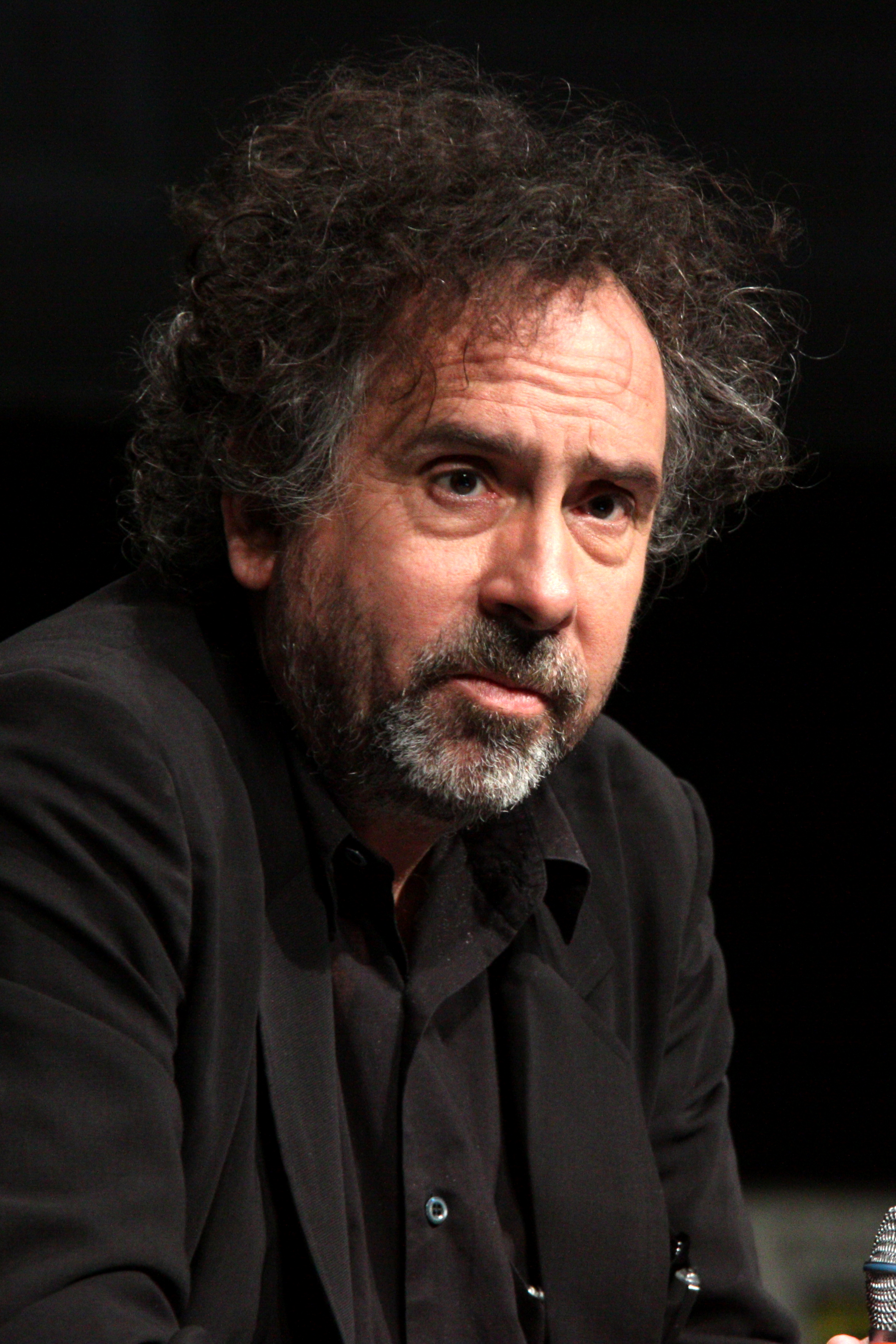
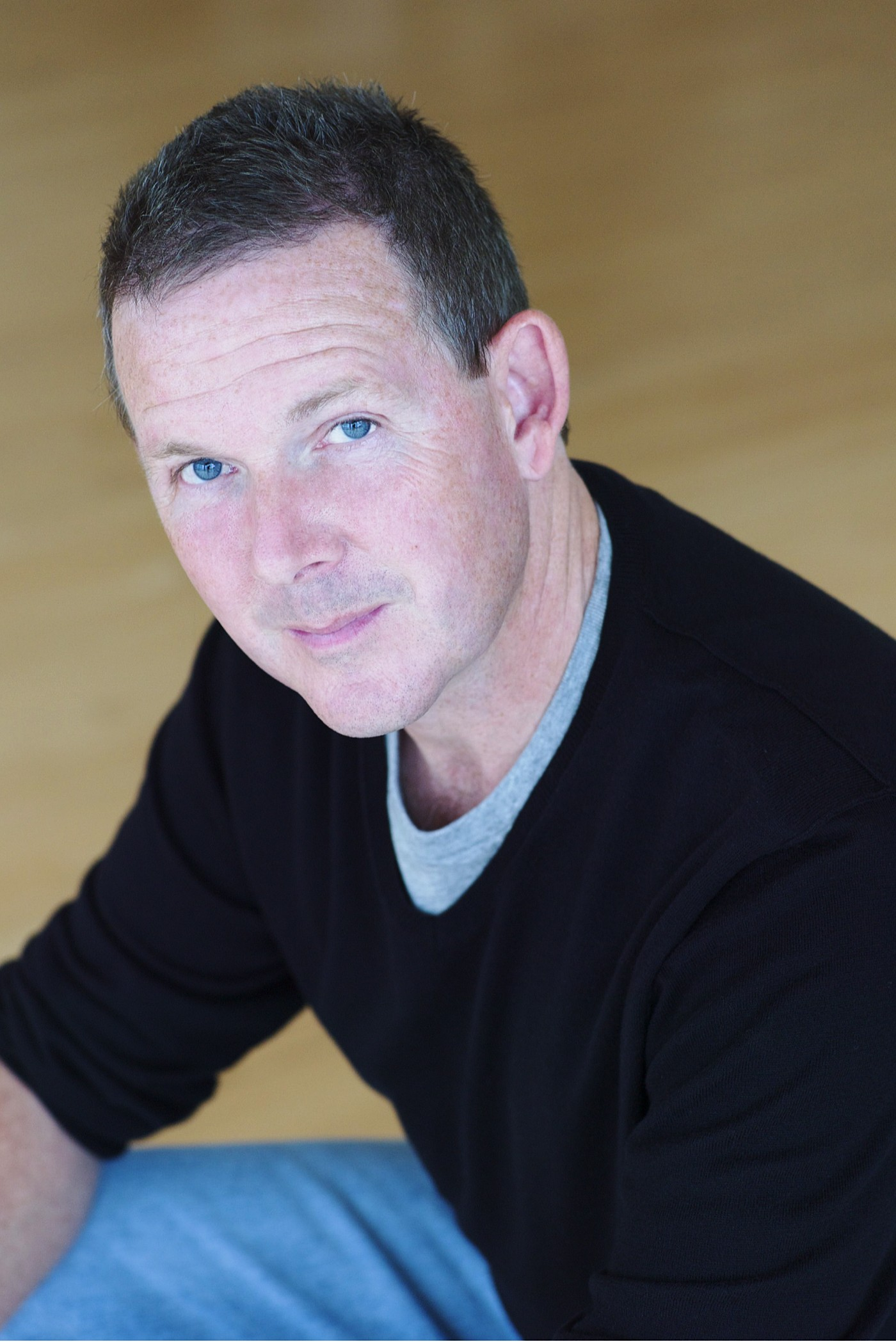
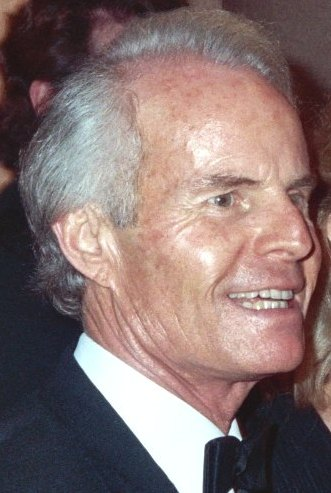
Director Tim Burton (left), screenwriter and co-producer John Logan and co-producer Richard D. Zanuck

Tim Burton first saw Stephen Sondheim's 1979 stage musical, Sweeney Todd: The Demon Barber of Fleet Street, as a CalArts student in London in 1980. Burton recalled his experience of seeing the show, saying, "I was still a student, I didn't know if I would be making movies or working in a restaurant, I had no idea what I would be doing. I just wandered into the theatre and it just blew me away because I'd never really seen anything that had the mixture of all those elements. I actually went three nights in a row because I loved it so much." Burton was not a fan of the musical genre but was struck by how cinematic the musical was, and repeatedly attended subsequent performances. He described it as a silent film with music, and was "dazzled both by the music and its sense of the macabre." When his directing career took off in the late 1980s, Burton approached Sondheim with a view to making a cinematic adaptation, but nothing came of it. Sondheim said, "[Burton] went off and did other things."

Director Sam Mendes had been working on a film version of the story for several years, and in June 2003 Sondheim was approached to write the script. Although he turned down the offer, Mendes and producer Walter F. Parkes obtained his approval to use writer John Logan instead. Logan had previously collaborated with Parkes on Gladiator, and claimed his biggest challenge in adapting the Sondheim stage play "was taking a sprawling, magnificent Broadway musical and making it cinematic, and an emotionally honest film. Onstage, you can have a chorus sing as the people of London, but I think that would be alienating in a movie." Mendes left to direct the 2005 film Jarhead, and Burton took over as director after his project, Ripley's Believe It or Not!, fell apart due to its excessive budget.

When Burton was hired, he reworked the screenplay with Logan. Logan felt they agreed over the film's tone due to "share[d] stunted childhoods watching Amicus movies". Turning a three-hour stage musical into a two-hour film required some changes. Some songs were shortened, while others were completely removed. Burton said, "In terms of the show, it was three hours long, but we weren't out to film the Broadway show, we were out to make a movie, so we tried to keep the pace like those old melodramas. Sondheim himself is not a real big fan of movie musicals, so he was really open to honing it down to a more pacey shape." Burton and Logan also reduced the prominence of other secondary elements, such as the romance between Todd's daughter Johanna and Anthony, to allow them to focus on the triangular relationship between Todd, Mrs. Lovett, and Toby.

=== Casting ===
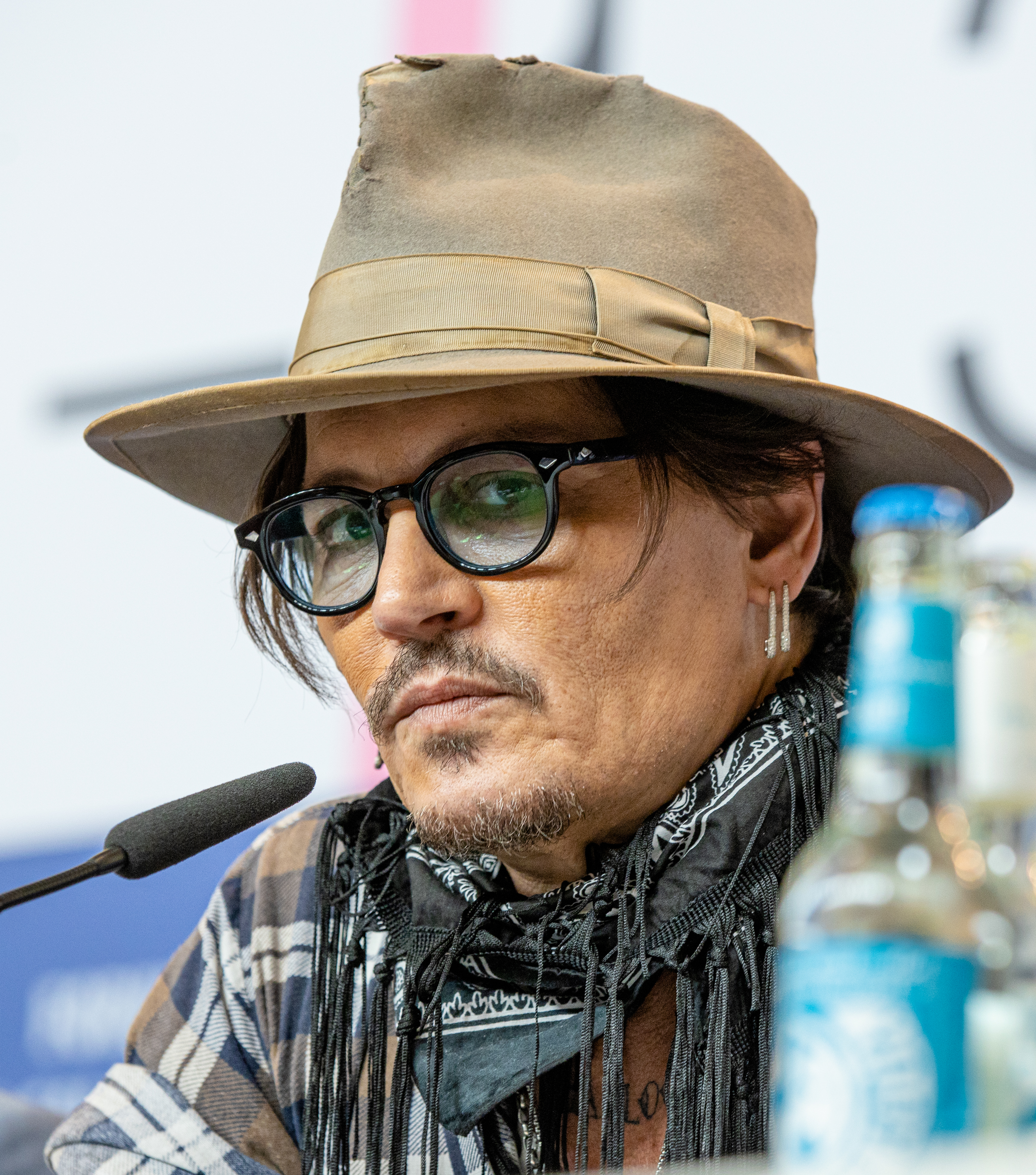
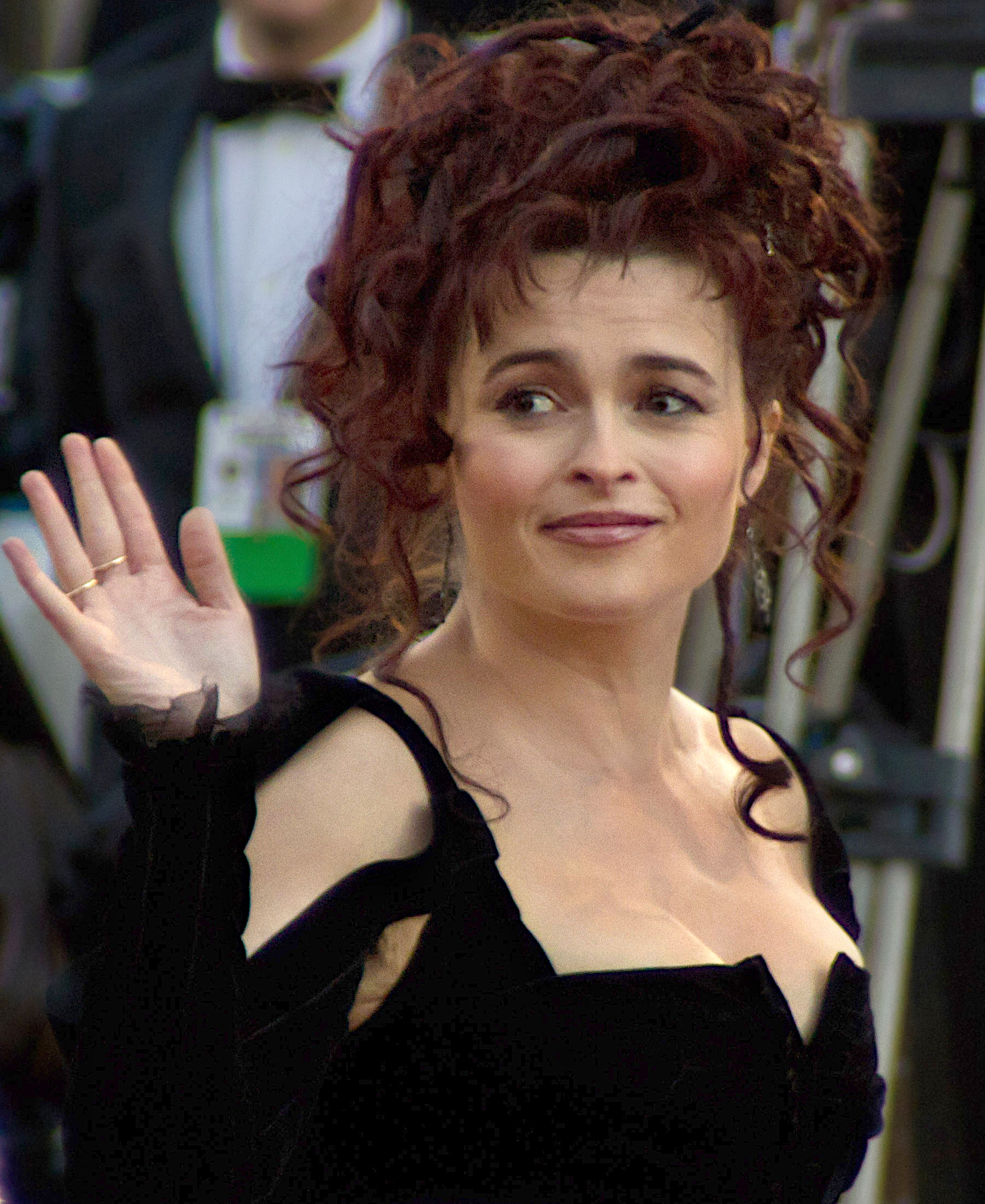
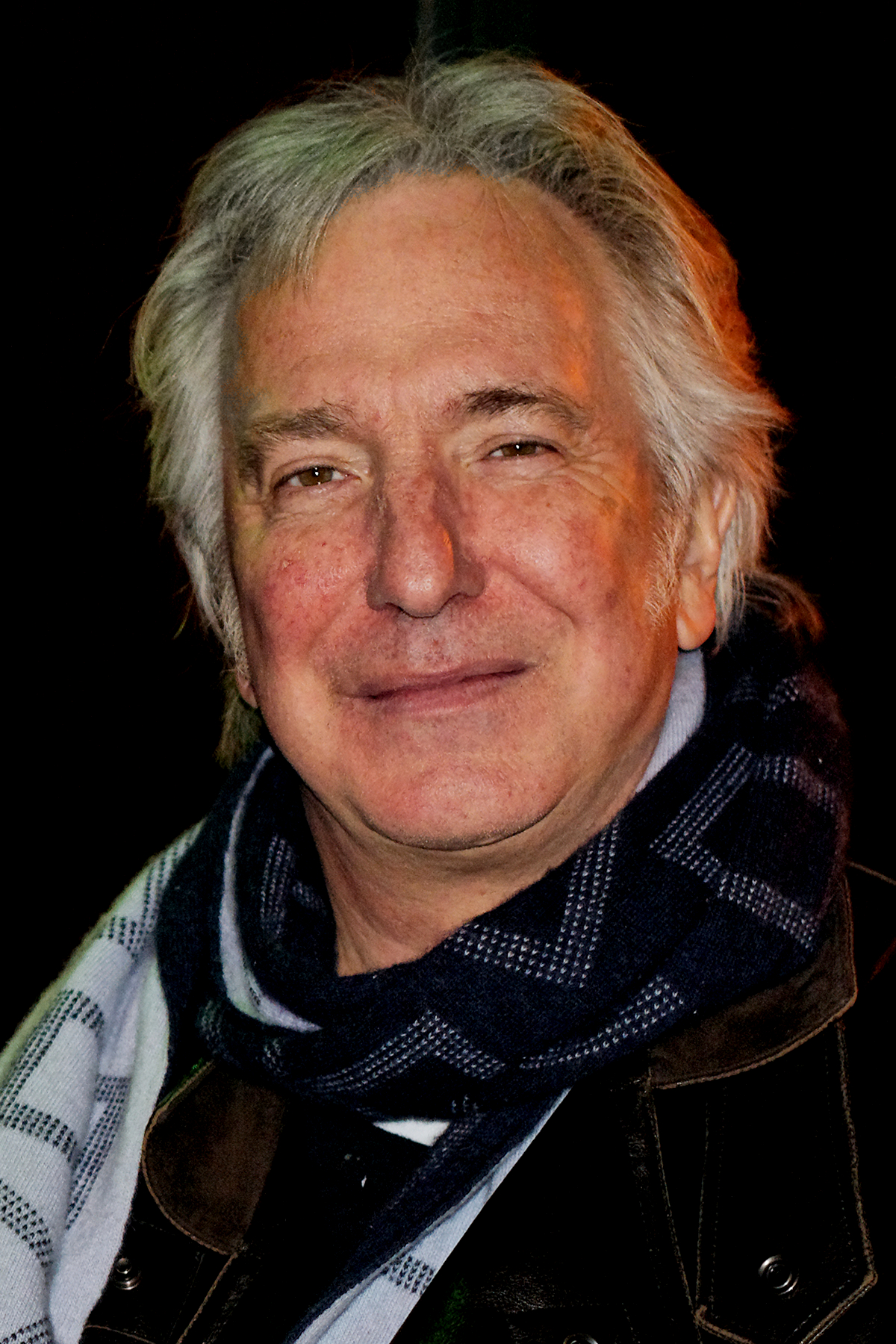
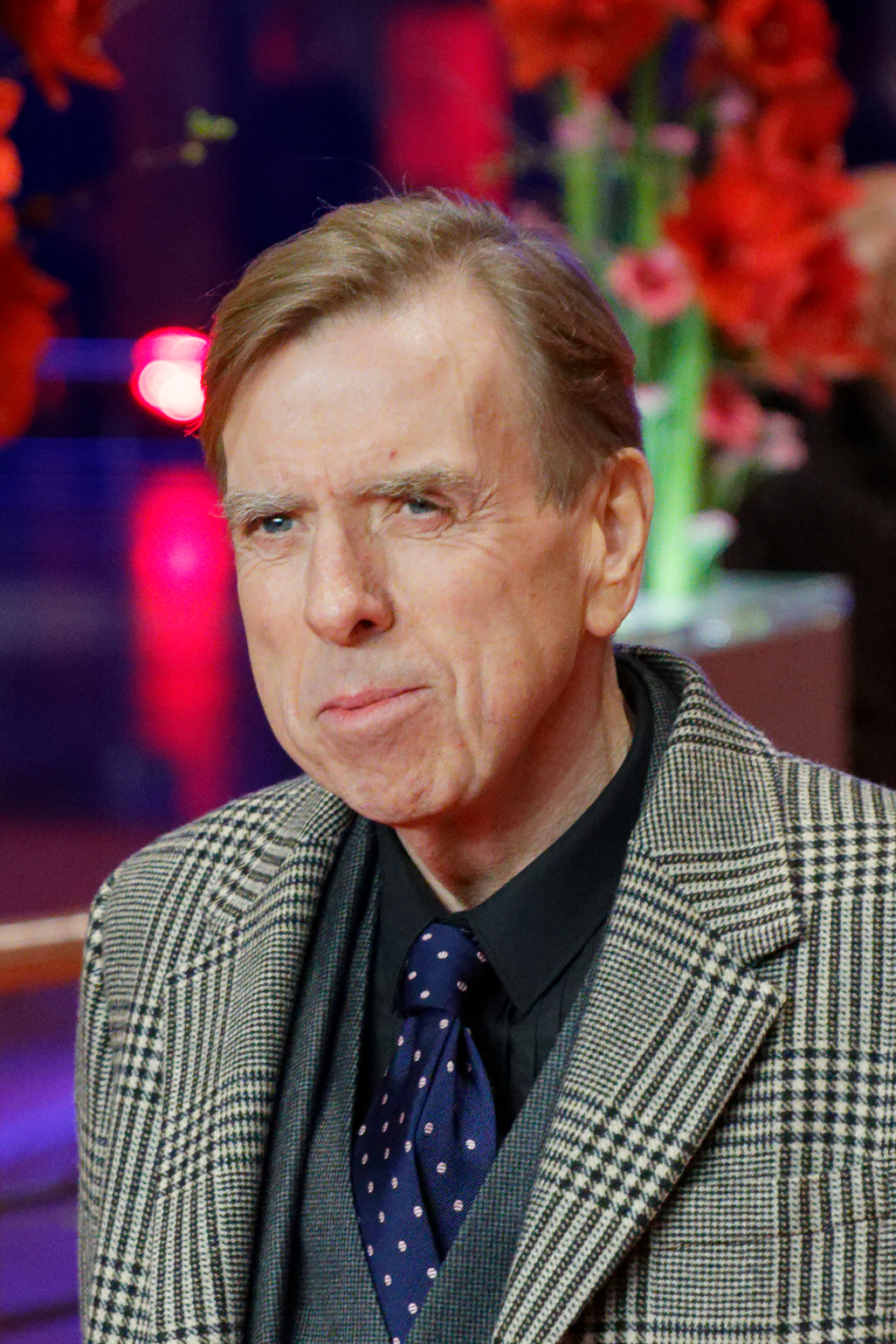
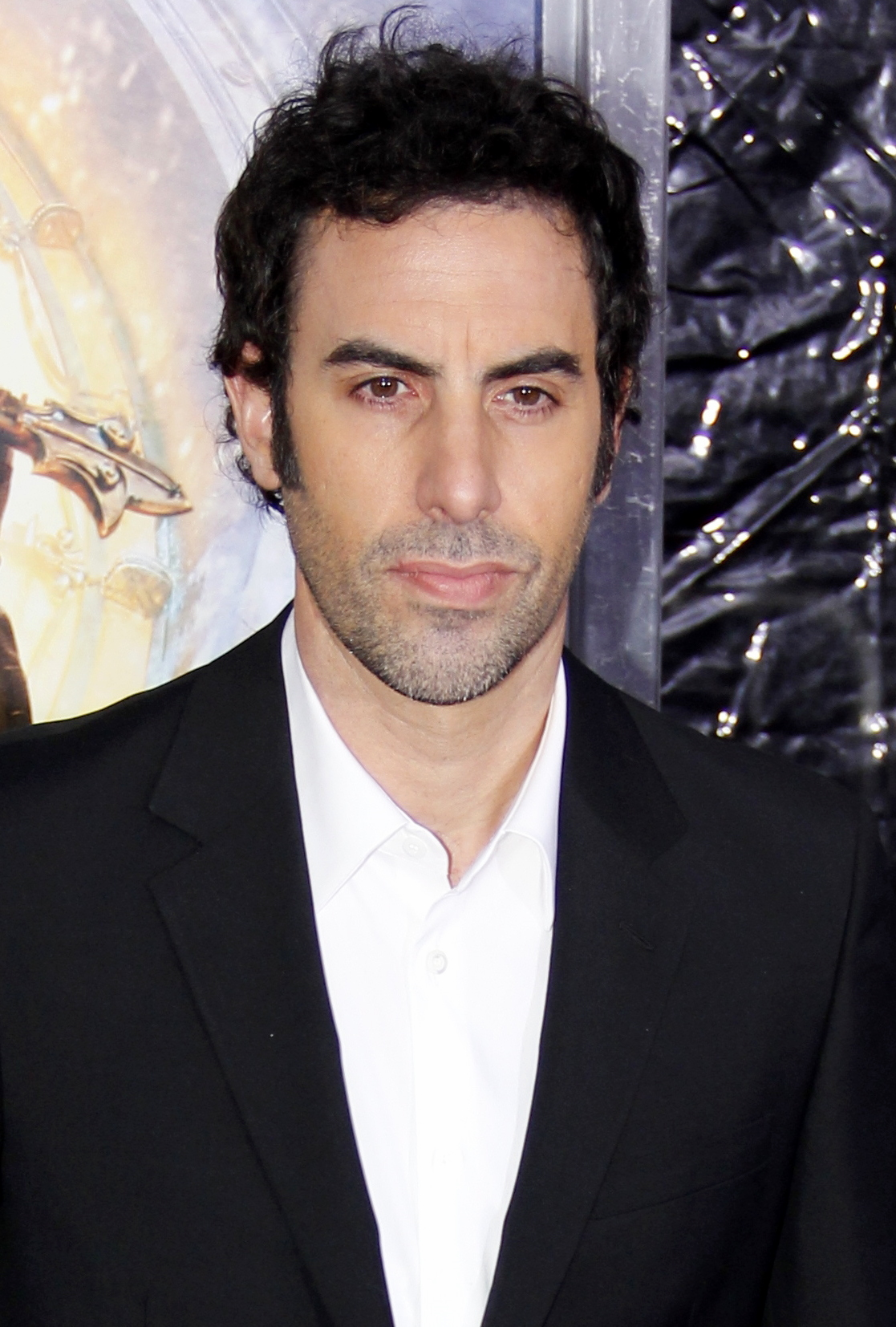
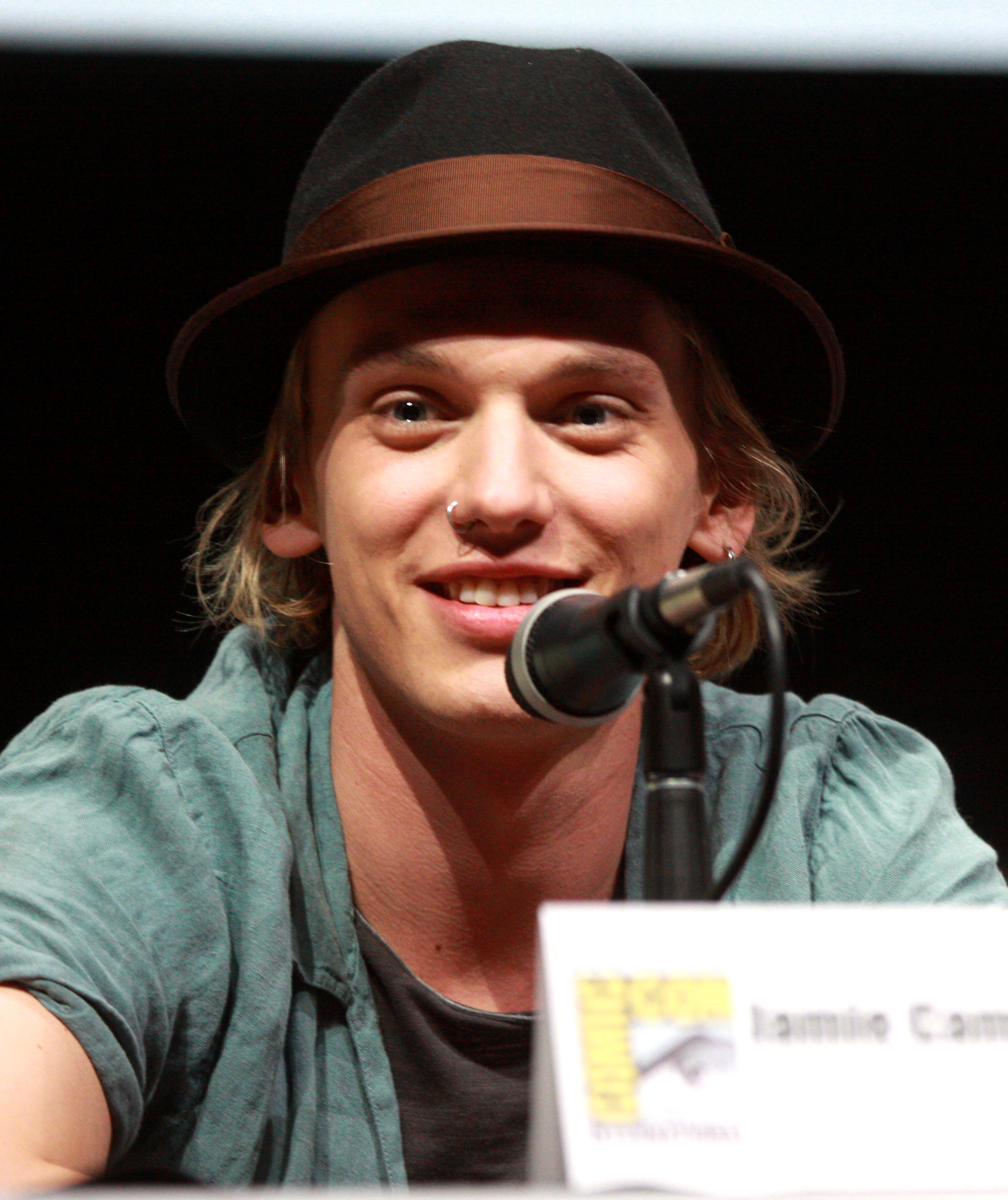
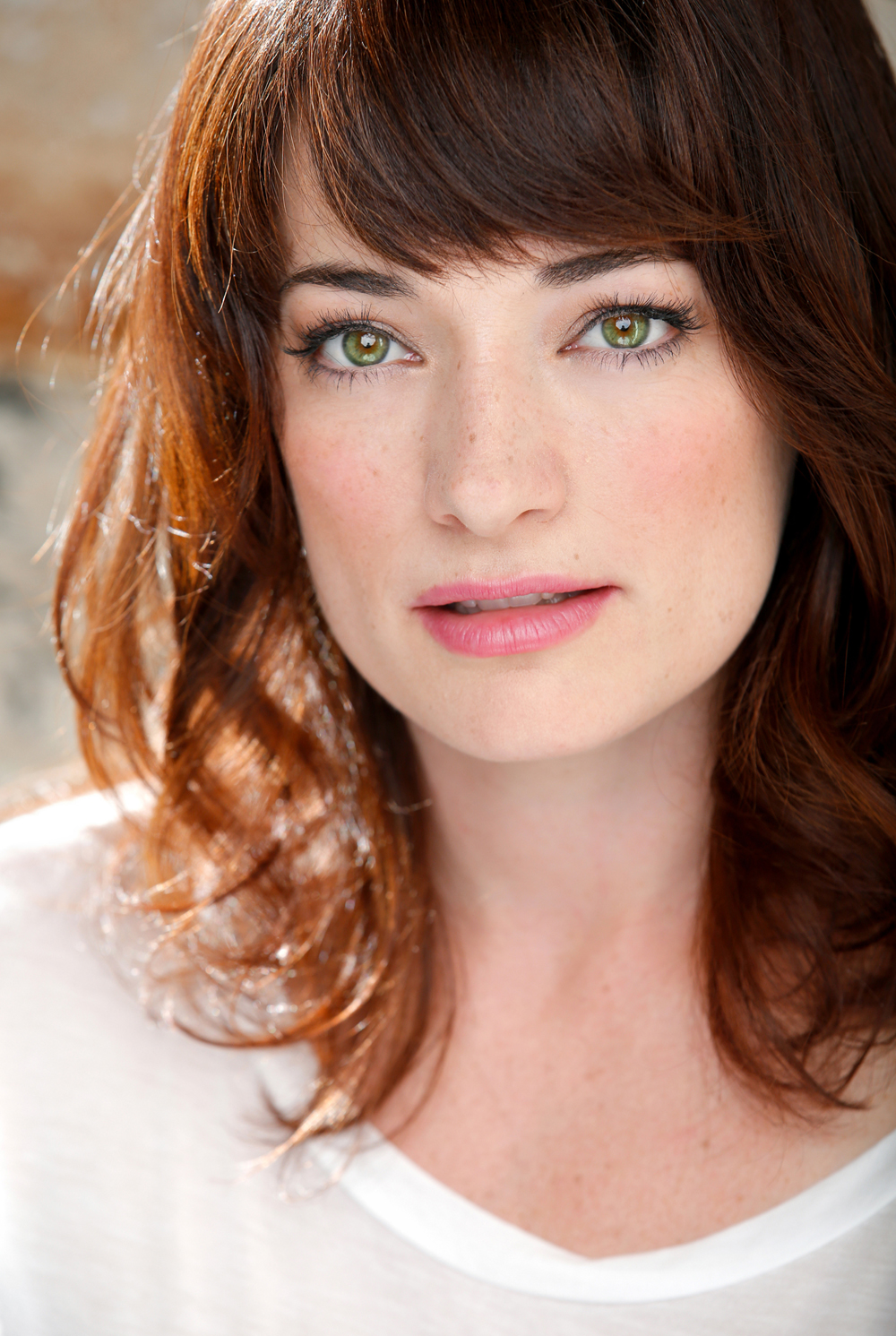
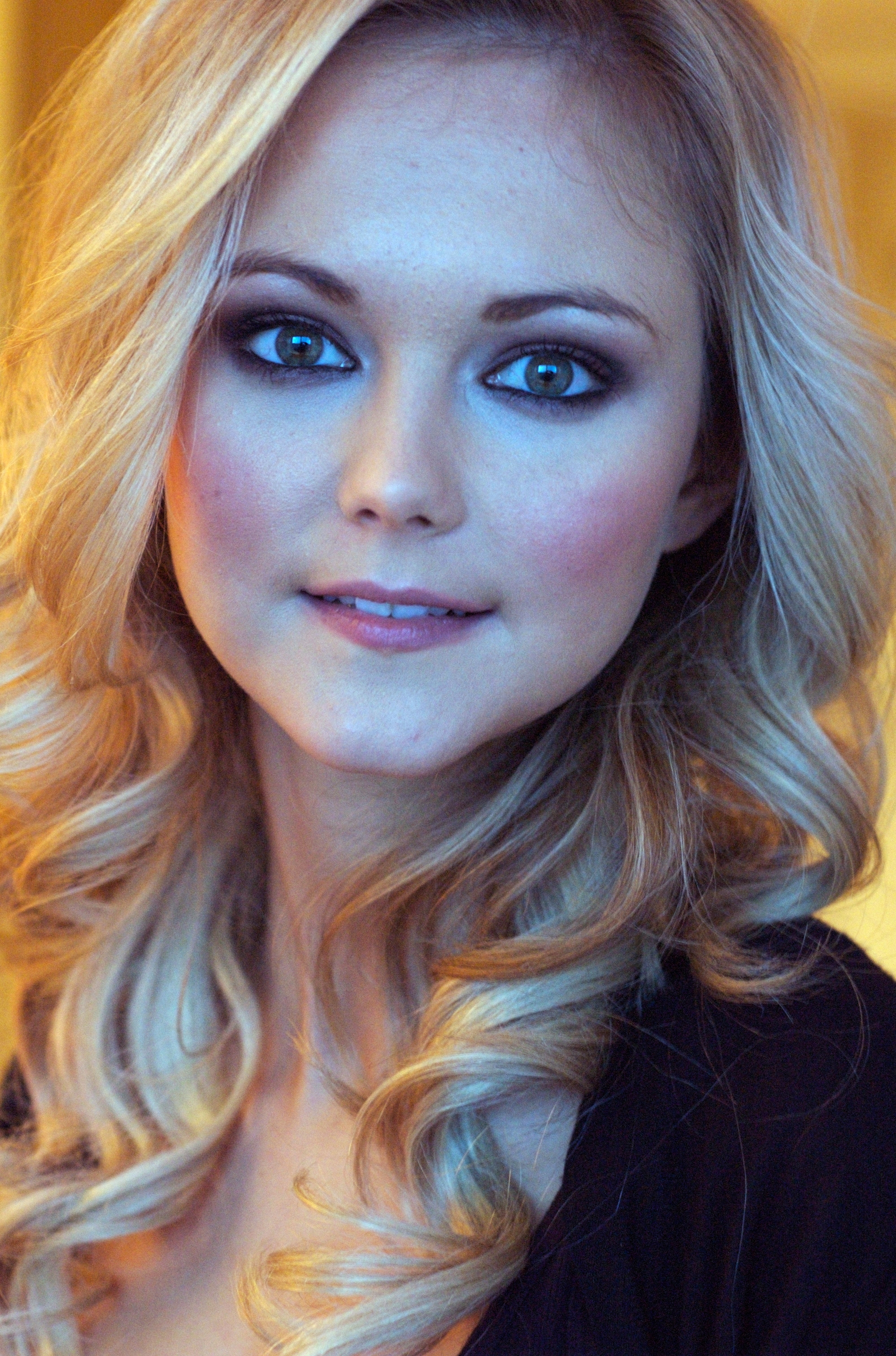
Top row: Johnny Depp (left), Helena Bonham Carter and Alan Rickman.
Middle row: Timothy Spall (left), Sacha Baron Cohen and Jamie Campbell Bower.
Bottom row: Laura Michelle Kelly (left) and Jayne Wisener.

DreamWorks announced Burton's appointment in August 2006, and Johnny Depp was cast as Todd. Christopher Lee, Peter Bowles, Anthony Head, and five other actors were set to play the ghost narrators, but their roles were cut (Head does appear in an uncredited cameo as a gentleman who congratulates Depp after the shaving contest). According to Lee, these deletions were due to time constraints caused by a break in filming during March 2007, while Depp's daughter recovered from an illness. Burton's domestic partner Helena Bonham Carter was cast in October 2006, as well as Sacha Baron Cohen. In December 2006, Alan Rickman was cast. In January 2007, Laura Michelle Kelly was cast as Lucy Barker. Timothy Spall was added to the cast, and said he was urged to audition by his daughter, who wanted him to work with Depp. He recalled, "I really wanted this one – I knew Tim was directing and that Johnny Depp was going to be in it. My daughter, my youngest daughter, really wanted me to do it for that reason – Johnny Depp was in it. (She came on set to meet Depp) and he was really delightful to her, she had a great time. Then, I took her to the junket – and (Depp) greeted her like an old pal when he saw her. I've got plenty of brownie points at the moment."

Three members of the cast had never been in a film before: Ed Sanders was cast as Toby, Jayne Wisener as Johanna, and Jamie Campbell Bower as Anthony. Four days after his initial audition, Bower learned that he had secured the part; he commented, "I think I wee'd myself. I was out shopping at the time and I got this call on my mobile. I was just like, 'OH MY GOD!' Honestly, I was like a little girl running around this shop like oh-my-god-oh-my-god-oh-my-god."

=== Filming ===
Filming began on 5 February 2007 at Pinewood Studios, and was completed by 11 May, despite a brief interruption when Depp's daughter was taken seriously ill. Burton opted to film in London, where he had felt "very much at home" since his work on Batman in 1989. Production designer Dante Ferretti created a darker, more sinister London by adapting Fleet Street and its surrounding area. Burton initially planned to use minimal sets and film in front of a green screen, but decided against it, stating that physical sets helped actors get into a musical frame of mind: "Just having people singing in front of a green screen seemed more disconnected".

Depp created his own image of Todd. Heavy purple and brown make-up was applied around his eyes to suggest fatigue and rage, as if "he's never slept". Burton said of the character Sweeney Todd, "We always saw him as a sad character, not a tragic villain or anything. He's basically a dead person when you meet him; the only thing that's keeping him going is the one single minded thing which is tragic. You don't see anything else around him." Depp said of the character, "He makes Sid Vicious look like the innocent paper boy. He's beyond dark. He's already dead. He's been dead for years." Depp also commented on the streak of white in Todd's hair, saying, "The idea was that he'd had this hideous trauma, from being sent away, locked away. That streak of white hair became the shock of that rage. It represented his rage over what had happened. It's certainly not the first time anyone's used it. But it's effective. It tells a story all by itself. My brother had a white spot growing up, and his son has this kind of shock of white in his hair."

Burton insisted that the film be bloody, as he felt stage versions of the play which cut back on the bloodshed robbed it of its power. For him, "Everything is so internal with Sweeney that [the blood] is like his emotional release. It's more about catharsis than it is a literal thing." Producer Richard D. Zanuck said that "[Burton] had a very clear plan that he wanted to lift that up into a surreal, almost Kill Bill kind of stylization. We had done tests and experiments with the neck slashing, with the blood popping out. I remember saying to Tim, 'My God, do we dare do this?'" On set, the fake blood was coloured orange to render correctly on the desaturated colour film used, and crew members wore bin liners to avoid getting stained while filming. This macabre tone made some studios nervous, and it was not until Warner Bros. Pictures, DreamWorks and Paramount had signed up for the project that the film's $50 million budget was covered. Burton said "the studio was cool about it and they accepted it because they knew what the show was. Any movie is a risk, but it is nice to be able to do something like that that doesn't fit into the musical or slasher movie categories."

After the filming, Burton said of the cast, "All I can say is this is one of the best casts I've ever worked with. These people are not professional singers, so to do a musical like this which I think is one of the most difficult musicals, they all went for it. Every day on the set was a very, very special thing for me. Hearing all these guys sing, I don't know if I can ever have an experience like that again." Burton said of the singing, "You can't just lip synch, you'd see the throat and the breath, every take they all had to belt it out. It was very enjoyable for me to see, with music on the set everybody just moved differently. I'd seen Johnny (Depp) act in a way I'd never seen before, walking across the room or sitting in the chair, picking up a razor or making a pie, whatever. They all did it in a way that you could sense."

Depp said of working with Baron Cohen, when asked what he was like in real life (meaning, not doing one of his trademark characters), "He's not what I expected. I didn't look at those characters and think, 'This will be the sweetest guy in the world'. He's incredibly nice. A real gentleman, kind of elegant. I was impressed with him. He's kind of today's equivalent of Peter Sellers."

== Music ==
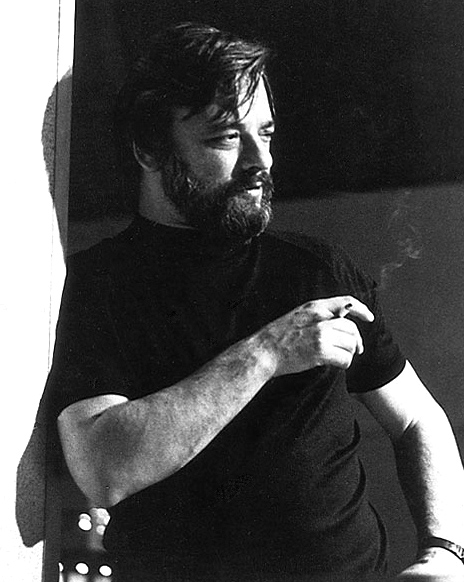
Composer and lyricist Stephen Sondheim

Burton wanted to avoid the traditional approach of patches of dialogue interrupted by song, "We didn't want it to be what I'd say was a traditional musical with a lot of dialogue and then singing. That's why we cut out a lot of choruses and extras singing and dancing down the street. Each of the characters, because a lot of them are repressed and have their emotions inside, the music was a way to let them express their feelings."

He cut the show's famous opening number, "The Ballad of Sweeney Todd", explaining, "Why have a chorus singing about 'attending the tale of Sweeney Todd' when you could just go ahead and attend it?" Sondheim acknowledged that, in adapting a musical to film, the plot has to be kept moving, and was sent MP3 files of his shortened songs by Mike Higham, the film's music producer, for approval. Several other songs were also cut, and Sondheim noted that there were "many changes, additions and deletions... [though]... if you just go along with it, I think you'll have a spectacular time." To create a larger, more cinematic feel, the score was re-orchestrated by the stage musical's original orchestrator, Jonathan Tunick, who increased the orchestra from 27 musicians to 78.

The Deluxe Complete Edition soundtrack was released on 18 December 2007. Depp's singing was described by a New York Times reviewer as "harsh and thin, but amazingly forceful". Another critic adds that, though Depp's voice "does not have much heft or power", "his ear is obviously excellent, because his pitch is dead-on accurate... Beyond his good pitch and phrasing, the expressive colorings of his singing are crucial to the portrayal. Beneath this Sweeney’s vacant, sullen exterior is a man consumed with a murderous rage that threatens to burst forth every time he slowly takes a breath and is poised to speak. Yet when he sings, his voice crackles and breaks with sadness."

== Marketing ==
The film's marketing has been criticized for not advertising it as a musical. Michael Halberstam of the Writers' Theatre said, "By de-emphasizing the score to the extent they did in the trailer, it is possible the producers were condescending to us – a tactic which cannot ultimately end in anything but tears." In the UK, a number of audience members walked out of the film on realizing it was a musical, and complaints that advertisements for the film were deliberately misleading were made to both the Advertising Standards Authority and Trading Standards agency. The studios involved opted for a low-key approach to their marketing. Producer Walter Parkes stated, "All these things that could be described as difficulties could also be the movie's greatest strengths." Warner Bros. felt it should take a similar approach to marketing as with The Departed, with little early exposure and discouraging talk of awards.

== Release ==
Sweeney Todd: The Demon Barber of Fleet Street officially opened at the United States box office on 21 December 2007, in 1,249 theatres, and took $9,300,805 in its opening weekend. Worldwide releases followed during January and February 2008, with the film performing well in the United Kingdom and Japan. The film grossed $52,898,073 in the United States and Canada, and $99,625,091 in other markets, accumulating a worldwide total of $152,523,164. In the United States, the Marcus Theaters Corporation was not initially planning to screen the film following its premiere, because it was unable to reach a pricing agreement with Paramount. However, the dispute was resolved in time for the official release.

=== Critical reception ===
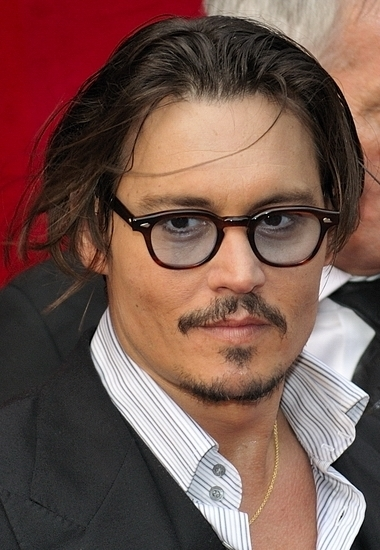
Johnny Depp's performance as Sweeney Todd received critical acclaim, earning him a nomination for the Academy Award for Best Actor.

Although Sondheim was cautious of a cinematic adaptation of his musical, he was largely impressed by the results. Sweeney Todd: The Demon Barber of Fleet Street received critical acclaim, and the performances, visuals, production design, costume design and faithfulness to its source material were praised. The review aggregator Rotten Tomatoes reports that 86% of critics gave the film positive reviews based on 231 reviews and an average rating of 8.1/10. The site's critical consensus reads, "Full of pith and Grand Guignol grossness, this macabre musical is perfectly helmed and highly entertaining. Tim Burton masterfully stages the musical in a way that will make you think he has done this many times before." Metacritic assigned the film an average score of 83 out of 100, based on 39 reviews, indicating "universal acclaim". Sweeney Todd appeared on many critics' top ten lists of the best films of 2007.

Of the reviewers, Time rated it an A-minus and added, "Burton and Depp infuse the brilliant cold steel of Stephen Sondheim's score with a burning passion. Helena Bonham Carter and a superb supporting cast bring focused fury to this musical nightmare. It's bloody great." Time's Richard Corliss named the film one of its top ten movies of 2007, placing it fifth. Roger Ebert of the Chicago Sun-Times gave it four stars out of four, lauding Burton's visual style. In his review in Variety, Todd McCarthy called it "both sharp and fleet" and "a satisfying screen version of Stephen Sondheim's landmark 1979 theatrical musical ... things have turned out uniformly right thanks to highly focused direction by Tim Burton, expert screw-tightening by scenarist John Logan, and haunted and musically adept lead performances from Johnny Depp and Helena Bonham Carter. Assembled artistic combo assures the film will reap by far the biggest audience to see a pure Sondheim musical, although just how big depends on the upscale crowd’s tolerance for buckets of blood, and the degree to which the masses stay away due to the whiff of the highbrow." Lisa Schwarzbaum of Entertainment Weekly gave the film a B-plus in its Movie Reviews section and stated, "To stage a proper Sweeney Todd, necks must be slit, human flesh must be squished into pastries, and blood ought to spurt in fountains and rivers of death. Enter Tim Burton, who ... has tenderly art-directed soup-thick, tomato-red, fake-gore blood with the zest of a Hollywood-funded Jackson Pollock." She went on to refer to the piece as "opulent, attentive ... so finely minced a mixture of Sondheim's original melodrama and Burton's signature spicing that it's difficult to think of any other filmmaker so naturally suited for the job."

In its DVD Reviews section, EW's Chris Nashawaty gave the film an A-minus, stating, "Depp's soaring voice makes you wonder what other tricks he's been hiding... Watching Depp's barber wield his razors... it's hard not to be reminded of Edward Scissorhands frantically shaping hedges into animal topiaries 18 years ago... and all of the twisted beauty we would've missed out on had [Burton and Depp] never met." In Rolling Stone, Peter Travers awarded it 3½ out of 4 stars and added, "Sweeney Todd is a thriller-diller from start to finish: scary, monstrously funny and melodically thrilling ... [the film] is a bloody wonder, intimate and epic, horrific and heart-rending as it flies on the wings of Sondheim's most thunderously exciting score." As with Time, the critic ranked it fifth on his list of the best movies of 2007. Kirk Honeycutt of The Hollywood Reporter said, "The blood juxtaposed to the music is highly unsettling. It runs contrary to expectations. Burton pushes this gore into his audiences' faces so as to feel the madness and the destructive fury of Sweeney's obsession. Teaming with Depp, his long-time alter ego, Burton makes Sweeney a smoldering dark pit of fury and hate that consumes itself. With his sturdy acting and surprisingly good voice, Depp is a Sweeney Todd for the ages." Harry Knowles gave the film a highly positive review, calling it Burton's best film since Ed Wood, his favorite Burton film, and said it was possibly superior. He praised all of the cast and the cinematography, but noted it would probably not appeal to non-musical fans due to the dominance of music in the film.

=== Retrospective reception ===
Since its release, the film has been widely assessed as one of the greatest musical films of the 21st century. It was listed as number 490 on Empire's 500 Greatest films of all time in 2008 and it appeared at number 88 on its list of the 100 Greatest Movies Of The 21st Century in 2020. In 2018, Den of Geek included it on its list of the "Best Movie Musicals of the 21st Century", with David Crow calling it "an ingenious work that Burton contemplated for decades. That's also probably why it's his last great film too. Leaning into the horrific conceit of a musical that is about a vengeful barber murdering any loner who steps into his shop, and letting the landlady downstairs, Mrs. Lovett, bake them into meat pies, the film version of Sweeney Todd more closely resembles 1930s Universal horror movies or '40s Val Lewton chillers than it does traditional stagecraft." Next Best Picture ranked it number 10 on its list of "The Top Movie Musicals of the 21st Century So Far", with Daniel Howat writing, "While many film musicals rely on bright colors and charming songs, Sweeney Todd dwells in the darkness. It's not without some faults, but it deserves its spot on this list for the variety it provides."

In 2020, HuffPost ranked it number 11 on its list of the "20 Best Movie Musicals of the 21st Century", with Daniel Welsh calling it "an oft-underrated offering from film director Tim Burton that mixes his loves of the macabre and the musical".

In 2021, /Film ranked it number 14 on its list of "The 14 Greatest Movie Musicals of the 21st Century", with Leah Marilla Thomas writing, "Don't let anyone tell you that Dear Evan Hansen couldn't be a black comedy because it's a musical and musicals have to be sincere. Sweeney Todd is about a man who murders his clients and has his downstairs neighbor bake them into meat pies she sells to the neighborhood. That's way worse than fabricating emails to manipulate a grieving family. It's not even a little bit sincere, but it's darkly entertaining and a great musical."

In 2022, MovieWeb ranked it number 6 on its list of the "Best Movie Musicals of the 21st Century So Far", with Rachel Johnson writing, "With many unique songs such as 'No Place Like London', 'Pretty Women' and 'Not While I'm Around', it's no wonder audiences were hooked."

In 2023, Collider ranked it number 21 on its list of the "30 Best Musicals of All Time", with Jeremy Urquhart writing, "It's incredibly morbid, but might prove to have a very dark sense of humor for those who like their comedy pitch-black. The dark, moody look of the film pairs extremely well with all the memorable songs, and of the many collaborations between director Tim Burton and star Johnny Depp, this is easily one of their best." It also ranked number 32 on Screen Rant's list of "The 35 Best Musicals of All Time". (Note: Attributed to multiple references:)

== Awards and nominations ==
Sweeney Todd: The Demon Barber of Fleet Street received four nominations at the 65th Golden Globe Awards, winning two: Best Motion Picture — Musical or Comedy, and Depp for his performance as Sweeney Todd. Burton was nominated for Best Director, and Helena Bonham Carter was nominated for her performance as Mrs. Lovett. The film was included in the National Board of Review of Motion Pictures's top ten films of 2007, and Burton was presented with their award for Best Director. The film was also nominated for two BAFTA Awards: Best Costume Design and Make Up and Hair. Sweeney Todd further received three Oscar nominations at the 80th Academy Awards: Best Actor in a Leading Role for Depp, Best Achievement in Costume Design, winning Best Achievement in Art Direction. Depp won the award for Best Villain at the 2008 MTV Movie Awards, where he thanked his fans for "sticking with [him] on this very obtuse and strange road," and the Choice Movie Villain award at the Teen Choice Awards. At Spike TV's 2008 Scream Awards, the film won two awards: Best Horror Movie, and Best Actor in a Horror Movie or TV Show (Depp).

Year	Award	Category	Nominee	Result
2007	London Film Critics' Circle Award	British Actress of the Year	Helena Bonham Carter	Nominated
2008	Academy Award	Best Actor	Johnny Depp	Nominated
2008	Academy Award	Best Art Direction	Dante Ferretti and Francesca Lo Schiavo	Won
2008	Academy Award	Best Costume Design	Colleen Atwood	Nominated
2008	Evening Standard British Film Award	Best Actress	Helena Bonham Carter	Won
2008	American Cinema Editors	Best Edited Feature Film – Comedy or Musical	Chris Lebenzon	Won
2008	British Academy Film Award	Best Costume Design	Colleen Atwood	Nominated
2008	British Academy Film Award	Best Makeup and Hair	Ivana Primorac	Nominated
2008	Broadcast Film Critics Association Award	Best Film		Nominated
2008	Broadcast Film Critics Association Award	Best Cast		Nominated
2008	Broadcast Film Critics Association Award	Best Actor	Johnny Depp	Nominated
2008	Broadcast Film Critics Association Award	Best Young Performer	Ed Sanders	Nominated
2008	Broadcast Film Critics Association Award	Best Director	Tim Burton	Nominated
2008	Golden Globe Award	Best Motion Picture – Musical or Comedy		Won
2008	Golden Globe Award	Best Actor – Motion Picture Musical or Comedy	Johnny Depp	Won
2008	Golden Globe Award	Best Actress – Motion Picture Musical or Comedy	Helena Bonham Carter	Nominated
2008	Golden Globe Award	Best Director	Tim Burton	Nominated
2008	Italian Online Movie Award	Best Actor in a Leading Role	Johnny Depp	Nominated
2008	Italian Online Movie Award	Best Actress in a Supporting Role	Helena Bonham Carter	Nominated
2008	Italian Online Movie Award	Best Art Direction	Dante Ferretti and Francesca Lo Schiavo	Won
2008	Italian Online Movie Award	Best Costume Design	Colleen Atwood	Won
2008	Italian Online Movie Award	Best Make-up	Ivana Primorac	Won
2008	MTV Movie Award	Best Villain	Johnny Depp	Won
2008	National Movie Award	Best Musical		Nominated
2008	National Movie Award	Best Performance (Male)	Johnny Depp	Won
2008	National Movie Award	Best Performance (Female)	Helena Bonham Carter	Nominated
2008	Saturn Award	Best Horror Film		Won
2008	Saturn Award	Best Actor	Johnny Depp	Nominated
2008	Saturn Award	Best Actress	Helena Bonham Carter	Nominated
2008	Saturn Award	Best Supporting Actor	Alan Rickman	Nominated
2008	Saturn Award	Best Director	Tim Burton	Nominated
2008	Saturn Award	Best Costume	Colleen Atwood	Won
2008	Saturn Award	Best Make-up	Peter Owen and Ivana Primorac	Nominated
2008	Saturn Award	Best Writing	John Logan	Nominated
2008	Scream Award	Best Horror Actor	Johnny Depp	Won
2008	Scream Award	Best Horror Actress	Helena Bonham Carter	Nominated
2008	Scream Award	Best Director	Tim Burton	Nominated
2008	Teen Choice Award	Choice Movie: Villain	Johnny Depp	Won
2009	Empire Award	Best Horror		Nominated
2009	Empire Award	Best Actor	Johnny Depp	Nominated
2009	Empire Award	Best Actress	Helena Bonham Carter	Won
2009	Empire Award	Best Director	Tim Burton	Nominated

== Home media ==
Sweeney Todd: The Demon Barber of Fleet Street was released on DVD on 1 April 2008, and on Blu-ray on 21 October 2008. An HD DVD release was announced for the same date, but due to the discontinuation of the format, Paramount canceled this version in preference for international distribution of the Blu-ray release. The DVD version has thus far sold nearly two million copies, bringing in more than $38 million in revenue.

The movie was released in 4K on Ultra HD Blu-ray on 3 September 2024.
