= Merle Louise =

American actress (1934–2025)

- Louise as Susan in Company
- Born: Merle Louise Letowt; April 15, 1934; Manhattan, New York City, U.S.
- Died: January 11, 2025 (aged 90); Lake Katrine, New York, U.S.
- Occupation: Actress
- Spouse: Peter Simon (m. 1963, divorced)
- Children: 3

Merle Louise (born Merle Louise Letowt, April 15, 1934 – January 11, 2025) was an American actress, best known for appearing in four Stephen Sondheim musicals, most famously as "The Beggar Woman" in Sweeney Todd, for which she won the Drama Desk Award for Outstanding Featured Actress in a Musical.

== Broadway and Sondheim ==
Early in her career, (when she was still known as Merle Letowt), she played "Thelma" in the original cast of Gypsy (1959). Eventually, she moved up to the lead role of "Dainty June", playing it for much of the Broadway run and on the first national tour.

Louise returned to Broadway in Company (1970) as "Susan". Her biggest success was as "the Beggar Woman" in Sweeney Todd: The Demon Barber of Fleet Street (1979), for which she won the Drama Desk Award as Outstanding Featured Actress in a Musical. However, her "ravaging crazy" performance is not preserved in the video recording as she was not a member of the national tour that was videotaped.

In Into the Woods (1987), she played a trio of roles: the ethereal "Cinderella's Mother", the practical "Granny" (of "Little Red Riding Hood" fame), and the unseen vengeful "Giantess".

Louise originated roles with other Broadway composers as well. She played "Mme. Dindon" in Jerry Herman's La Cage aux Folles (1983) and "Molina's Mother" in Kander and Ebb's Kiss of the Spider Woman (1993), a role she also played on London's West End, in Toronto and on the national tour.

Off-Broadway, she created the role of Cecily MacIntosh in Charlotte Sweet (1982). Regionally, she was an acclaimed actress in classics by Shakespeare, Chekhov, Molière, Pinter, Ibsen, and Shaw.

The cast of the Broadway show, title of show (along with some of their theatrical friends), created a game based around Merle Louise, entitled "Six Degrees of Merle Louise", which is based on Six Degrees of Kevin Bacon except that it generally uses Broadway musicals in place of movies to link two performers.

== On-camera and later career ==
Louise's on-camera work has been limited, most notably appearing in the televised production of Into the Woods and a documentary about the recording of the Original Cast Album of Company. She has had some guest appearances on shows such as Law & Order.

Her last performances include "Frau Schneider" in Cabaret, "Mme. Armfeldt" in A Little Night Music, Lady Henslowe in Elizabeth Rex with Nicu's Spoon Theater Company and "Jeanette" in The Full Monty in Massachusetts, and in New York she appeared in Luke Yankee's award-winning show, The Jesus Hickey in July 2007.

== Personal life ==
Louise was born on April 15, 1934 in Manhattan, New York. She was raised in Bethlehem, Pennsylvania. After graduating high school, Louise began working as a mechanical calculator for the Lehigh Valley Railroad while also taking classes in New York City. In 1963, she married actor and lighting director Peter Simon. They had three children and her marriage with Simon ended in divorce.

Louise died on January 11, 2025 at a nursing home in Lake Katrine, New York at the age of 90.

== Broadway credits ==
- Gypsy (Thelma; later Dainty June Hovick) 1959
- Company (Susan) 1970
- Sweeney Todd: The Demon Barber of Fleet Street (Beggar Woman) 1979
- La Cage aux Folles (Marie Dindon) 1983
- Into the Woods (Cinderella's Mother/Granny/Giantess) 1987–89
- Kiss of the Spider Woman (Mrs. Molina) 1993
- Into the Woods (Cinderella's Mother/Granny/Giantess) 1997
- Billy Elliot: The Musical (Grandma understudy/Ensemble) 2008
