= Laura Michelle Kelly =

British actress

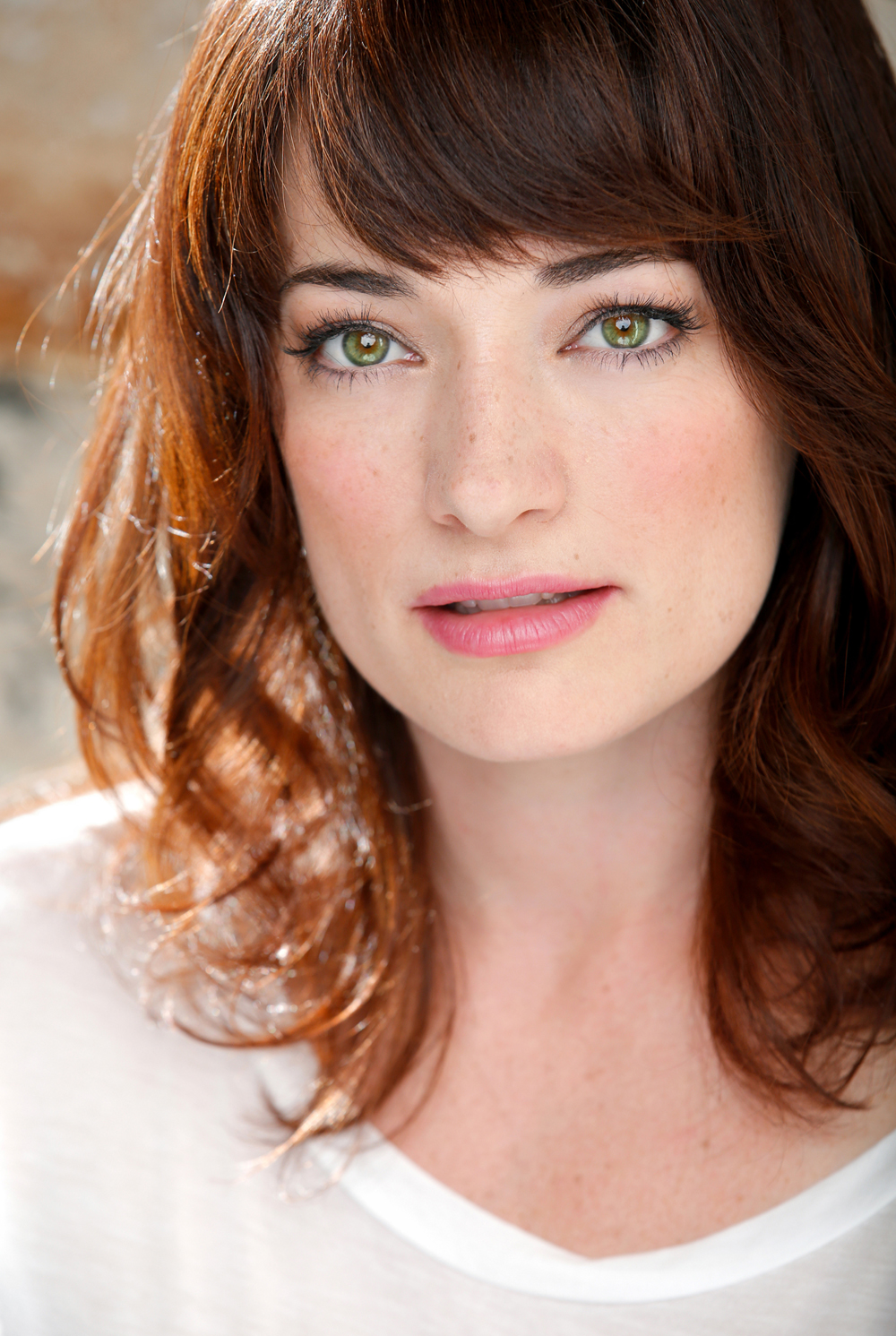
- Born: 4 March 1981 (age 45); Totton, Hampshire, England, UK
- Occupations: Actress, singer
- Years active: 1997–present
- Spouses: Nick Winston (m. 2001–2008) Sean Helleren (m. 2019)
- Children: 3

Laura Michelle Kelly (born 4 March 1981) is an English actress and singer, best known for originating the roles of Mary Poppins in Mary Poppins in the West End, for which she won a Laurence Olivier Award for Best Actress in a Musical, and Sylvia Llewelyn Davies in Finding Neverland on Broadway.

== Early life ==
Kelly was born in Totton near Southampton, Hampshire, and moved to a farm on the Isle of Wight with her family.

Her first musical appearance was in Bugsy Malone in middle school. She studied with a local singing teacher, Barbara Walter, who cast Kelly in amateur productions at local theatres, including Shanklin Stagecoach of Performing Arts School.

== Career ==
=== Musical theatre ===
Kelly's West End musical credits include Beauty and the Beast, Whistle Down The Wind as Swallow (2000) (with a 10-year-old Jessie J), Les Misérables as Eponine at the Palace Theatre (2001), Mamma Mia! as Sophie at the Prince Edward Theatre (2002), and My Fair Lady as Eliza Doolittle in the transfer of the National Theatre's production to the Theatre Royal, Drury Lane (2003). She made her Broadway debut as Hodel in the 2004 Broadway revival of Fiddler on the Roof.

Mary Poppins premiered in September 2004 at the Bristol Hippodrome, followed in December by its opening in the West End at the Prince Edward Theatre. For her role as the title character, Kelly earned rave reviews as well as the 2005 Laurence Olivier Award for Best Actress in a Musical. She left Mary Poppins on 29 October 2005 after more than 400 performances and was succeeded by Scarlett Strallen. Kelly then went to Singapore to star in a revival of A Twist of Fate in November 2005, produced by the Singapore Repertory Company. It also starred Anthony Drewe (who co-wrote the music with Singaporean composer Dick Lee).

In 2006 she returned to the London stage performing in A Tribute to Dirty Dancing at Kenwood House and Marble Hill. Kelly and Michael Ball performed at the Hackney Empire on 1 August 2006 to celebrate Anthony Newley for BBC Radio 2 which was broadcast on 29 September 2006. Kelly was the Special Guest for Jools Holland and His Rhythm and Blues Orchestra on tour during December 2006. On 27 August 2007, Kelly made her BBC Proms debut, performing "The Prayer" from the film Quest for Camelot alongside Michael Ball.

During 2007–08, Kelly played the role of Galadriel in the original London production of The Lord of the Rings – The Musical at Theatre Royal, Drury Lane. The show began previews on 9 May 2007, with an official opening night of 19 June 2007. Kelly played her final performance on 2 February 2008, and was replaced by Abbie Osman.

She played the dual role of a nun and former Coronation Street actor Johnny Briggs's trophy wife in an ITV1 production of Agatha Christie's Nemesis.

Kelly appeared alongside Kevin Spacey and Jeff Goldblum in David Mamet's play Speed-the-Plow at London's Old Vic theatre from 1 February to 26 April 2008 and at the Ruhrfestspiele in Recklinghausen, Germany, in May 2008.

Kelly voiced "Dorothy", the patient's girlfriend in Focus on the Family Radio Theatre's production of The Screwtape Letters. This audio-drama was also expanded to include speaking roles for Wormwood, the patient (called "John Hamilton"), and the patient's mother. Andy Serkis played Screwtape and Bertie Carvel was Wormwood.

Beginning 12 October 2009, Kelly reprised the role of Mary Poppins at the New Amsterdam Theatre on Broadway, replacing Scarlett Strallen. Kelly temporarily left the cast of Mary Poppins on 6 March 2011, where she was replaced by originator Ashley Brown, to shoot a film. She returned to the production on 19 July 2011. She played her final performance on 9 October 2011 and was replaced by Steffanie Leigh.

Kelly and former London co-star Gavin Lee performed as Mary Poppins and Bert in the America Celebrates 4 July at Ford's Theatre in front of President Barack Obama and First Lady Michelle Obama on 6 June 2010. The special aired on 2 July 2010 on ABC. Kelly once again reunited with Lee when he returned to the role of Bert in the Broadway production of Mary Poppins on 24 August 2010.

Kelly starred as Anna Leonowens in a production of The King and I at the Muny from 6–12 August 2012. She also starred as Ensign Nellie Forbush in the Muny production of South Pacific from 8–14 July 2013.

She reprised the role of Eliza in a concert version of My Fair Lady at the Kennedy Center in Washington, D.C., on 5 May 2013.

On 2 June 2014, it was announced that Kelly would star as Sylvia Llewelyn Davies in the world premiere of the new musical, Finding Neverland, which played at the American Repertory Theater from July through September 2014. She reprised the role in the Broadway production, which opened on 15 April 2015 at the Lunt-Fontanne Theatre. She stayed with the production until it closed on 21 August 2016. That same month she appeared as the Mother in the Ellis Island concert of Ragtime.

In November 2016, Kelly began a North American tour starring as Anna Leonowens in The King and I. She stayed with the show until 17 March 2018.

In 2018, she was announced as the lead in the Encores! production of Me and My Girl, alongside former Mary Poppins co-star Christian Borle.

She plays the role of Julie, one of the Cavendish family, in the musical The Royal Family of Broadway at the Barrington Stage Company (Massachusetts) in June 2018 to July 2018.

=== Recording artist ===
Kelly released her debut single, "There Was A Time", through EMIs Angel label for download only on 17 April 2006. The single enjoyed Record of the Week status on BBC Radio 2. This single is from her debut solo album, The Storm Inside which was released on 1 May 2006. The album includes six original songs and six covers, including three songs which Kelly wrote herself and a cover of Keane's "Somewhere Only We Know", which predated the Lily Allen cover and has a similar arrangement.

A new single, "What's It All For?" (written by singer Judie Tzuke) was released as a digital download on 5 March 2007. It was followed by the release of her album, also titled What's It All For?, with the three new tracks and a selection of others from The Storm Inside, which was released in 2006.

Kelly also recorded a song for the radio-dramatization of The Screwtape Letters that she starred in as Dorothy, the patient's girlfriend. The song was called, "This is a War".

=== Film ===
Kelly made her feature film debut in 2007 as Lucy Barker in the Tim Burton/DreamWorks film Sweeney Todd.

Her first starring role was in the 2013 film Goddess, playing a mother of young twins in an isolated farmhouse in Tasmania, who finds unexpected fame when performances of her songs go viral on the Internet without the knowledge of her absent husband, played by Ronan Keating.

== Personal life ==
In 2001 Kelly married choreographer Nick Winston. They divorced after seven years of marriage. On 24 January 2019, she married Sean Helleren in Maui, Hawaii. They had a son in 2019. They had a daughter in 2021. They had a second daughter in 2022.

She is the third of four children and the only girl. She comes from a Christian family. She has said that her faith is an important part of her life, and that she prays before every show. When asked what three items she would take to a desert island, she said, "My Bible, iPhone and my guitar."

== Filmography ==
Year	Film	Role	Notes
2007	Agatha Christie's Marple: Nemesis	Margaret Lumley/Verity Hunt	TV film
2007	Sweeney Todd: The Demon Barber of Fleet Street	Lucy Barker/Beggar Woman	
2013	Goddess	Elspeth Dickens	
