= Lucy Barker =

Sweeney Todd's wife

- Sweeney Todd character
- Adapted by: Tim Burton
- Portrayed by: Merle Louise; Sara Woods; Laura Michelle Kelly; Victoria Clark; Diana Dimarzio; Macy Gower

In-universe information
- Alias: The Beggar Woman
- Gender: Female
- Occupation: Housewife
- Spouse: Benjamin Barker
- Children: Johanna Barker
- Home: London

Lucy Barker is a fictional character that appears in some versions of the story Sweeney Todd. Lucy is the wife of barber Benjamin Barker, who is unjustly imprisoned by Judge Turpin, who wants Lucy for himself. After Turpin sexually abuses her, Lucy attempts suicide with poison, but survives and goes insane. Years later, Benjamin Barker, now calling himself "Sweeney Todd", returns to London and his neighbor, Mrs. Lovett tells Todd about Lucy poisoning herself, but leaves out that Lucy lived. He later finds Lucy as a beggar woman; not recognizing her, he slits her throat, before killing Mrs. Lovett.

Lucy appears in the musical adaptation Sweeney Todd: The Demon Barber of Fleet Street and the subsequent film adaptation. In the film, the character is portrayed by Laura Michelle Kelly. In the play she has been played most notably by Merle Louise, who won an Outstanding Featured Actress in a Musical award from Drama Desk Award for her portrayal, and by Ruthie Ann Miles, who was nominated for a Tony Award for Best Featured Actress in a Musical.

== Fictional biography ==
In the original legend and in the earliest melodramas and plays, Sweeney Todd has no wife or backstory and is the primary villain of the stories he appears in. His wife Lucy first appears in Christopher Bond's play. She is the faithful and loving wife of Benjamin Barker and mother of Johanna Barker, whose life is destroyed by the evil Judge Turpin, who exiles her husband in order to have her all to himself. Soon afterward, Turpin rapes her, so she then poisons herself with arsenic. She survives, but goes insane and disappears to live as a poor beggar, surviving on alms. Mistakenly believing her to be dead, Barker undertakes a long string of murders, with the ultimate goal of killing Turpin in order to avenge the destruction of his family.

In the 2007 film Sweeney Todd: The Demon Barber of Fleet Street, Lucy Barker is the wife of Benjamin Barker, a barber in London's Fleet Street. They are happily married and have a new baby, Johanna. Turpin lusts after Lucy, and has Barker falsely arrested and exiled so that he can have her to himself. Lucy ignores his advances, staying faithful to her husband, never once leaving home. Finally, she is lured to Turpin's estate, led to believe that the judge feels responsible for her plight and wants to help her. This is not the case, however: Lucy arrives at Turpin's masquerade ball, where he drugs and sexually abuses her. Lucy is so distraught that she attempts to kill herself with poison, but survives and is driven completely insane. She forgets everyone and everything she held dear and wanders the streets of London as a homeless beggar.

When Benjamin Barker, under the alias of "Sweeney Todd", returns years later, Mrs. Lovett, who was in love with him, leads him to believe that Lucy is dead so that she could have him to herself. Lucy shows evident distaste for Mrs. Lovett, calling her a witch and constantly hanging around her meat pie shop. Eventually, when Johanna is upstairs at the barber shop, Lucy pursues her up the stairs, believing Turpin's henchman Beadle Bamford to be in Todd's shop. Todd then shows up and Lucy begins to recognize him. He, however, does not recognize her, cuts her throat and drops her body down the chute. Downstairs, after Todd has killed Judge Turpin, Lovett recognizes Lucy's body and scrambles to get rid of her. Todd enters and discovers that he had just killed his beloved wife, whereupon Lovett concedes that she lied to him because she was in love with him. Enraged, Todd throws Lovett in the oven to burn to death. Stricken with remorse, Todd holds Lucy's body and allows Tobias Ragg to cut his throat, leaving them dead in each other's arms.

== Performers ==
- Merle Louise appeared in the original 1979 Broadway adaptation. She won a Drama Desk award for best featured actress.
- Dilys Watling played her in the 1980 London Production.
- Sara Woods played the role in 1982.
- Victoria Clark played her in the 2001 adaptation.
- Diana Dimarzio played Lucy in the 2005 Broadway revival.
- Laura Michelle Kelly portrayed Lucy in the 2007 film adaptation, Sweeney Todd: The Demon Barber of Fleet Street. Kelly was cast in January 2007.
- Rosemary Ashe portrayed Lucy in the 2008 Gothenburg production.
- Julie Orlando played Lucy in the 2008 Prince George adaptation.
- Audra McDonald played Lucy in the 2000 and 2014 New York Philharmonic concert versions.
- Rosalie Craig played Lucy in 2014.
- Debra Byrne played Lucy in a 2019 limited run that played in both Sydney and Melbourne.
- Ruthie Ann Miles played Lucy in the 2023 Broadway revival.

== Songs ==
In the musical Lucy Barker sings only one song by herself and many others with other characters. The tracks were all composed by Stephen Sondheim. The tracks include:

- "The Ballad of Sweeney Todd (Prologue)" (with Company)**
- "No Place Like London" (with Anthony and Todd)*
- "Ah, Miss" (with Anthony)**
- "Johanna (Quartet)" (with Anthony, Todd and Johanna)*
- "City on Fire/Searching" (with Company, Anthony/Todd, Mrs. Lovett and Johanna)*
- "Beggar Woman's Lullaby"*
- "The Ballad of Sweeney Todd (Epilogue)" (with Company)**

(* Edited for 2007 film)
(** Cut from 2007 film)

== Reception ==
=== Accolades ===
| Year | Award ceremony | Category | Nominee | Result | Ref |
|---|---|---|---|---|---|
| 1979 | Drama Desk Award | Outstanding Featured Actress in a Musical | Merle Louise | Won | |
| 2023 | Tony Award | Best Featured Actress in a Musical | Ruthie Ann Miles | Nominated | |
