= A Doll's Life =

1982 musical by Larry Grossman, Betty Comden, and Adolph Green

- Original Cast Recording
- Music: Larry Grossman
- Lyrics: Betty Comden and Adolph Green
- Book: Betty Comden and Adolph Green
- Basis: A rehearsal of Henrik Ibsen's classic play A Doll's House
- Productions: 1982 Broadway

A Doll's Life was a 1982 musical with music by Larry Grossman, and a book and lyrics by Betty Comden and Adolph Green. A sequel to the 1879 Henrik Ibsen play A Doll's House, it told the story of what happened to the lead character, Nora Helmer, after she left her husband and her old life behind to face the world on her own; in doing so, it examined several aspects of feminism and the ways in which women are treated.

A Doll's Life opened on Broadway at the Mark Hellinger Theatre on September 23, 1982, in a production directed by Hal Prince and starring Betsy Joslyn, George Hearn and Peter Gallagher. It closed three days later, after a run of 18 previews and 5 performances.

== Plot ==
Set within the framework of a contemporary rehearsal of Henrik Ibsen's classic play A Doll's House, it addresses the question of what might have transpired after Nora slammed the door and abandoned her tyrannical husband Torvald. Borrowing the fare from a young violinist, Otto, she takes the train to Christiania, where she accepts work in a cafe and soon becomes involved not only with Otto, but Eric Didrickson, the wealthy owner of shipping lines and fish canneries, and Johan Blecker, a lawyer, as well. Throughout the show, scenes in her new life mingle with intermittent flashbacks to the one she left behind.

== Musical numbers ==
Act I

- "Prologue" - Nora, Company
- "A Woman Alone" - Nora, Otto, Conductor, Company
- "Letter to the Children" - Nora
- "New Year's Eve" - Eric, Johan, Dr. Berg, Gustafson
- "Stay With Me, Nora" - Otto, Nora
- "Arrival" - Astrid, Company
- "Loki and Baldur" - Otto, Singers
- "You Interest Me" - Johan
- "Departure" - Astrid, Company
- "Letter From Klemnacht" - Astrid
- "Learn to Be Lonely" - Nora
- "Rats and Mice and Fish" - Women
- "Jailer, Jailer/Letter to the Children (reprise)" - Nora, Women
- "Excerpts From Loki and Baldur" - Company
- "Rare Wines" - Eric, Nora

Act II

- "No More Mornings" - Nora
- "There She Is" - Johan, Eric, Otto
- "Power" - Nora
- "Letter to the Children (reprise)" - Nora
- "At Last" - Johan
- "The Grand Cafe" - Company
- "Finale" - Company

== Productions ==
The Broadway production opened on September 23, 1982, at the Mark Hellinger Theatre. Directed by Hal Prince, the show featured scenic design by Timothy O'Brien and Tazeena Firth, costume design by Florence Klotz, lighting design by Ken Billington. and choreography by Larry Fuller. The cast featured Betsy Joslyn, George Hearn and Peter Gallagher.

A staged concert of the musical was presented by the York Theatre Company in New York City, New York from December 13, 1994 to January 22, 1995.

== Critical response ==
Frank Rich of the New York Times wrote that "three legendary Broadway hands - Harold Prince, Betty Comden and Adolph Green - have inflated a spectacularly unpromising premise with loads of money, good intentions and hard work, only to end up with a show that collapses in its prologue and then skids into a toboggan slide from which there is no return." He wrote of Prince's direction that "remarkably, there isn't a single idea in the staging that he hasn't done before - and better"; he criticized the character of Nora as being "merely a symbol: The Unliberated Female", and wrote that the show's heavily flawed dramaturgy "can't muster what should be a foolproof case" for its supposed revelations about feminism that "at this late date [...] are facts of life[.]" In a later piece for the Times, Rich wrote that the show was "merely pretentious," and that "to write a show in 1982 that espouses a primer-like feminist credo - as if feminism had only entered the public mind yesterday - seems, in its own way, a form of escapism (and not even an entertaining form at that)."

According to John Kenrick, the musical had "an almost operatic score, but the book droned on about the unfairness of life and an overly-elaborate Hal Prince production only made matters worse."

Despite its failure, the show received several Tony Award nominations, and an original cast recording was released on the Bay Cities label.

Broadway wags dubbed the show "A Doll's Death." One even suggested "A Door's Life," in reference to the portal out of which Nora slams at the end of the original Ibsen play, and which 'danced' almost continually throughout the musical, far more interestingly than most of the rest of the action.

== Awards and nominations ==
=== Original Broadway production ===
Year	Award ceremony	Category	Nominee	Result
1983	Tony Award	Best Book of a Musical	Adolph Green and Betty Comden	Nominated
1983	Tony Award	Best Original Score	Larry Grossman, Adolph Green, and Betty Comden	Nominated
1983	Tony Award	Best Actor in a Musical	George Hearn	Nominated
1983	Drama Desk Award	Outstanding Music	Larry Grossman	Nominated
1983	Theatre World Award		Peter Gallagher	Won
