= Jayne Wisener =

Irish actress and singer

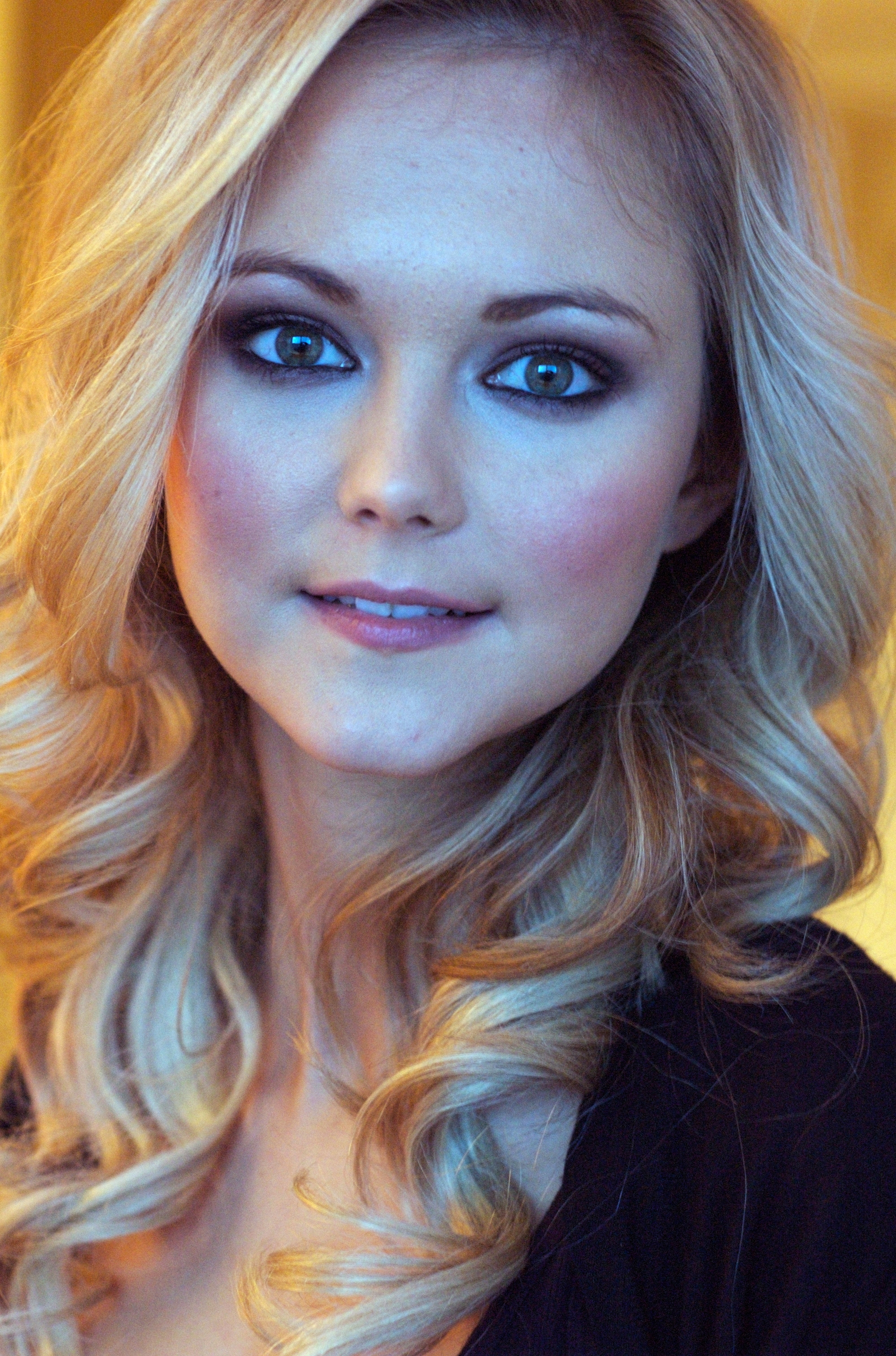
- Wisener in 2008
- Born: 19 May 1987 (age 39); Ballymoney, Northern Ireland, United Kingdom
- Education: Royal Conservatoire of Scotland
- Occupations: Actress, singer
- Years active: 2006–present
- Spouse: Wayne Austin (m. 2012)
- Children: 2

Jayne Wisener (born 19 May 1987) is an actress and singer from Northern Ireland. She played Johanna in the British-American film Sweeney Todd: The Demon Barber of Fleet Street. She also appeared in an episode of The Inbetweeners, as Lauren Harris.

== Background ==
Wisener was born in Ballymoney and grew up in Coleraine, Northern Ireland, where she attended D.H. Christie Memorial Primary School and the Coleraine High School for girls.

In 2005, she represented Antrim in the Rose of Tralee competition and finished 32nd out of 32 entries. Wisener also was part of Musical Theatre 4 Youth, and appeared in a workshop production of Falling.

While performing in a youth production of West Side Story at the Millennium Forum in Derry, Wisener was spotted by a talent scout, who asked her to audition for a role in Sweeney Todd. Wisener was, at age 19, deemed to look too old to play the 15-year-old Johanna Barker. When told this, Wisener "e-mailed them some pictures [of herself] without make-up. Usually looking young does [an actress] no favours at all, but [she was] quite pleased this time."

She trained at the Royal Scottish Academy of Music and Drama for one year, but left after landing the role of Johanna in Sweeney Todd.

Wisener made her stage debut in the UK premiere of the musical Parade at the Donmar Warehouse theatre in 2007.

She appeared in Boogeyman 3 playing the role of Amy, and in November 2008 created the role of Sophie in a West End showcase of the new musical The Lost Christmas by Laurence Mark Wythe at the Trafalgar Studios, London.

In 2009, she appeared in an episode of The Inbetweeners – "The Field Trip" (series 2, episode 1).

In late 2009 until early 2010, she appeared on stage playing the role of Mary Lennox in The Secret Garden at the West Yorkshire Playhouse.

In March 2011, she played Sally, a young woman in a centre for female juvenile delinquents, in The Runaway, based on Martina Cole's novel.

From 2012 to 2015, she played the role of student Sandie Morrow, in the BBC Northern Ireland drama Six Degrees.

Jayne also played the lead character 'Jay' in 2012 UK feature film, Life Just Is. She starred alongside Paul Nicholls and the two play a couple trying to work out their complex relationship. The film was not a success.

From December 2012 to January 2013, Jayne starred as Cinderella in The Grand Opera House, Belfast pantomime.

== Personal life ==
On 6 July 2012, Jayne married Wayne Austin in her hometown of Coleraine, Northern Ireland. In January 2019, Jayne gave birth to their first child, Michael.

=== Filmography ===
==== Film ====
Year	Title	Role	Notes
2007	Sweeney Todd: The Demon Barber of Fleet Street	Johanna Barker	Film debut
2008	Boogeyman 3	Amy	
2011	Jane Eyre	Bessie Lee	
2011	A Kiss for Jed Wood	Orla	
2012	Life Just Is	Jay	
2014	Covers	Summer	Short films
2017	Son of Perdition	The Woman	Short films
2020	Meow or Never	Blip the Space Pup	Short films
2021	The Heiress	Anna	
2024	Unsinkable	Maggie Malloy	

==== Television ====
Year	Title	Role	Notes
2009	Minder	Maria Grant	Series 1; episode 4: "A Matter of Life and Debt"
2009	The Inbetweeners	Lauren Harris	Series 2; episode 1: "The Field Trip"
2010	Vexed	Lucy B	Series 1; episode 3
2010	Casualty	Simone Lewis	Series 25; episodes 1–3, 6 & 7
2011	The Runaway	Sally	Mini-series; episode 2
2011	Injustice	Lucy Wilson	Mini-series; episodes 2–5
2011	Misfits	Stacie	Series 3; episode 7
2012	Nick Nickleby	Kat Nickleby	Main role. Mini-series; episodes 1–5
2012–2015	6Degrees	Sandie Morrow	Main role. Series 1–3; 18 episodes
2013	London Irish	Caoimhe	Mini-series; episode 4
2016	Doctors	Michelle Jardine	Series 18; episode 14: "I Know She Lies"
2020	Brave New World	Anna	Episode 4: "Swallow"
2021	Her Pen Pal	Tracy Cook	Television film
2021	Glow & Darkness	Beatrice of Burgundy	Episodes 1–7, 9 & 10
2025	Faithless	Miss Malone	Series 2; episodes 1–6
2025	Celebrity Mastermind	Herself - Contestant	Series 24; episode 4

==== Music videos ====
Year	Title	Role	Band
2009	Bullets	Train passenger	Archive
