= Sarah Rice =

American singer (1955–2024)

- Born: March 5, 1955; Okinawa, Japan
- Died: January 6, 2024 (aged 68); New York, U.S.
- Occupations: Stage and musical theatre actress and singer
- Spouse: John Hiller
- Website: sarahrice.com

Sarah Rice (March 5, 1955 – January 6, 2024) was an American theatre actress known for her work in the Stephen Sondheim productions Sweeney Todd and A Little Night Music, the former of which won her a Theatre World Award in 1979.

== Early life ==
Rice was born in Okinawa, Japan, while her father was serving in the U.S. Air Force there. Before her first birthday, the family moved to Arizona, where she, a sister, and two brothers grew up. Rice acted in some amateur productions and attended college for one year before she moved to New York at age 18.

== Career ==
Although Rice initially sought to use her ballet training to perform in classical dance, one of her early roles was that of Luisa in The Fantasticks. On Broadway, she created the original role of Johanna in Sweeney Todd (1979). She is also known for her Montreal performance of John Kenley and Robert Noll's The Phantom of the Opera-The Play, and her operatic performances in The Marriage of Figaro, The Barber of Seville and The Student Prince She performed with, among others, Michigan Opera Theater, Central City Opera, and the Santa Fe Opera.

Sarah was also a presence on the New York cabaret circuit. She won a 2010 Bistro Award and 2011 MAC Award (Female Vocalist) for her critically acclaimed solo cabaret debut, SCREEN GEMS: Songs of Old Hollywood. She also created and performed an Ivor Novello/Noel Coward show, GLAMOROUS NIGHTS & CARELESS RAPTURE, celebrating the music of the era of Downton Abbey, and MUSIC OF THE NIGHT, in which she sang and played the Theremin. She made many guest appearances in the award-winning SONDHEIM UNPLUGGED series at 54 Below. Her voice can be heard on the Grammy-nominated SONDHEIM UNPLUGGED recording. She was a part of The Mabel Mercer Foundation’s Cabaret Convention several times, including their Sondheim Evening.

In 2019, Sarah, together with fellow Broadway stars Carole Demas and Hal Robinson, created THANK YOU FOR YOUR LOVE, a celebration of Tom Jones and Harvey Schmidt, with whom they had all worked on numerous shows over many decades, including THE FANTASTICKS. The show was honored with a Bistro Award.

== Personal life and death ==
Rice died from cancer on January 6, 2024, at the age of 68, in New York City.
