= Anno Dracula =

1992 novel by Kim Newman

- First edition
- Author: Kim Newman
- Audio read by: William Gaminara
- Language: English
- Series: Anno Dracula series
- Genre: Alternate history, Horror
- Publisher: Simon & Schuster
- Publication date: 1992
- Publication place: United Kingdom
- Media type: Print (hardback and paperback)
- Pages: 409 (paperback)
- ISBN: 978-0-380-72345-4
- OCLC: 31220886
- Followed by: The Bloody Red Baron

Anno Dracula is a 1992 horror novel by British writer Kim Newman, the first in the Anno Dracula series. It is an alternate history using 19th-century English historical settings and personalities, along with characters from popular fiction.

== Plot summary ==
The interplay between humans who have chosen to "turn" into vampires and those who are "warm" (humans) is the backdrop for the plot which tracks Jack the Ripper's politically charged destruction of vampire prostitutes. The reader is alternately and sympathetically introduced to various points of view. The main characters are Jack the Ripper, and his hunters Charles Beauregard (an agent of the Diogenes Club), and Geneviève Dieudonné, an elder French vampire (a similar version of Dieudonné appeared in Newman's trilogy of novels, written under the pseudonym Jack Yeovil, for the Warhammer Fantasy universe).

== Origins ==
Newman credits Tod Browning's version of Dracula with creating a lifelong interest in horror, vampires and the character of Dracula specifically, having seen it as a child. He developed the general idea of an alternate history where Dracula was not defeated, as in Bram Stoker's original novel, during the 1980s but says he did not start working on the project until 1989-1991, having been asked to contribute a story to an anthology project, The Mammoth Book of Vampires. The resulting short story, Red Reign, was the "bare skeleton" of what became Anno Dracula.

Newman says he was drawn to using the murders of Jack the Ripper as a structure for the narrative because they involved "the highest in the land… and the dregs in the gutter", as well as noting that the presence of a character with medical expertise known as 'Jack' in Stoker's story made it a natural fit. The author also hoped to show the social unrest of the historical 1880s to contrast with the image of "Victorian values" as espoused by the British government of the 1980s.

== Synopsis ==
The novel deviates from the events of Bram Stoker's Dracula. In this world, Vlad Tepes kills Abraham Van Helsing, and an injury sustained to Dr. John Seward's hand during a fight with Renfield means Van Helsing's allies lack the strength to defeat Dracula at the crucial moment. Instead, Dracula kills Quincey Morris and Jonathan Harker and completes Mina Harker's turning into a vampire. With no one to oppose him, Dracula creates thousands of British vampires, marries and turns Queen Victoria (acquiring official royal status as Prince Consort) and ushers in a period of increasing British vampire domination. Dracula is well advanced in imposing a police state in the United Kingdom, where dissenters may be jailed or impaled without trial. Many of the country's leading scientists and intellectuals who choose to stay "warm" (including Sherlock Holmes) are imprisoned in concentration camps in the rural counties. The only two survivors of Van Helsing's group are Seward, who now runs a free clinic in Whitechapel, and Arthur Holmwood, Lord Godalming, who chooses to become a vampire and is groomed as a protégé by the new Prime Minister, Lord Ruthven.

Dieudonné has come down in the world, attending sick vampires in Seward's clinic. When another prostitute is murdered, Scotland Yard's Inspector Lestrade turns to them for an opinion. Beauregard, an agent of the Diogenes Club, is tasked with hunting down the killer, dubbed "Silver Knife" by the public, until an anonymous letter is delivered identifying him as "Jack the Ripper". The victim's inquest is attended by Lestrade, Dieudonné, and Beauregard, along with Captain Kostaki (an officer in Dracula's Carpathian Guard), and Dr. Henry Jekyll. Each sets out independently, with differing agendas. Separately, Lord Ruthven tasks Lord Godalming with heading an unofficial investigation to catch the killer.

Beauregard is abducted by an old enemy, a Tong leader who calls a truce on the understanding that the London underworld also has a strong interest in Silver Knife's capture. His official duties open a rift between him and his fiancée, Penelope Churchward (a cousin of his deceased first wife). In her zeal for social climbing, Penny urges Beauregard to agree that both of them will become vampires after their marriage.

Jack the Ripper strikes twice, failing to destroy one of his victims, Elizabeth Stride, who is brought to the clinic. Attempting to heal her wounds by shapeshifting, Stride does it imperfectly, lunging at Seward in her agony before dying. The implication is lost on Dieudonné and Beauregard, none of whom know that Seward, driven insane with grief over the loss of his love, Lucy Westenra, has taken to hunting vampires on his own. His murderous activities abate, temporarily, when he becomes infatuated with another prostitute, Mary Jane Kelly, who closely resembles Lucy.

During a temporary lull in the killings, Beauregard and Dieudonné, having similar ideas, become closer, while Penny is increasingly annoyed at Beauregard's lack of attention. In her haste, she allows Godalming to turn her, but the transformation is imperfect, and Penny almost dies, before Beauregard nurses her back to health with Dieudonné's help. Repulsed by the creature Penny has become, Beauregard ends their engagement and he and Dieudonné become lovers.

Public unrest escalates, with unclear causes. An anti-vampire leader is shot, and another of the Carpathian Guard is blown up with dynamite, both perhaps by the same mysterious vampire. Captain Kostaki and Scotland Yard Inspector Mackenzie form an unlikely alliance to find the culprit, but the mysterious vampire ambushes them, killing Mackenzie and disabling Kostaki with a silver bullet to his knee. Framed for Mackenzie's murder, Kostaki is imprisoned in the Tower of London, under the control of Graf Orlok. Lord Godalming questions Kostaki in secret, believing he has identified the Ripper as Sergeant Dravot, a vampire agent of the Diogenes Club. Eager to claim the credit for himself, Godalming leaves Kostaki to be condemned for Mackenzie's death. While following Dravot, alone, Godalming is aggravated by a "chance" meeting with his old friend, Seward, not realizing until too late that Seward is the real Ripper, who believes Godalming betrayed him and Lucy by becoming a vampire.

Beauregard and Dieudonné both realize that Seward is the Ripper. They race to Whitechapel and apprehend him, but not before he has killed both Kelly and Godalming. They leave the murder scene with Seward in custody, but then encounter Dravot, who admits to acting on the Diogenes Club's orders. These orders required him to kill Mackenzie, foment the riots, and stand by as Seward butchered Mary Jane Kelly. These orders also require there to be, officially, two Rippers: Seward and Godalming were working together before they fell out and Seward killed the other. Beauregard and Dieudonné are equally disgusted. When Seward points out that Dracula will turn him into a vampire so he can be tortured for all eternity, Beauregard kills him out of mercy.

When Beauregard confronts his superiors at the Diogenes Club, he asks why he was assigned to the case at all, since Dravot did all the actual work. He is told that Dravot, a vampire, could not be given the official credit for solving the murders, and it is necessary for Beauregard to carry out the final step of the plan.

Beauregard soon understands what this means when he and Dieudonné are invited to Buckingham Palace to be officially thanked by Queen Victoria for their role in catching the Ripper. Inside the palace, the two lovers confront Count Dracula, holding the turned Victoria as a prisoner. Knowing that neither of them can defeat Dracula in direct combat, Beauregard slips Seward's silver scalpel to Victoria, allowing her to kill herself, thus depriving Dracula of his status as Prince Consort and his legal authority over Great Britain. Before the vampires can retaliate, a riot breaks loose outside the Palace – possibly orchestrated by the club – and spills inside, allowing Beauregard and Dieudonné to escape and forcing Dracula to flee the country.

== Characters ==
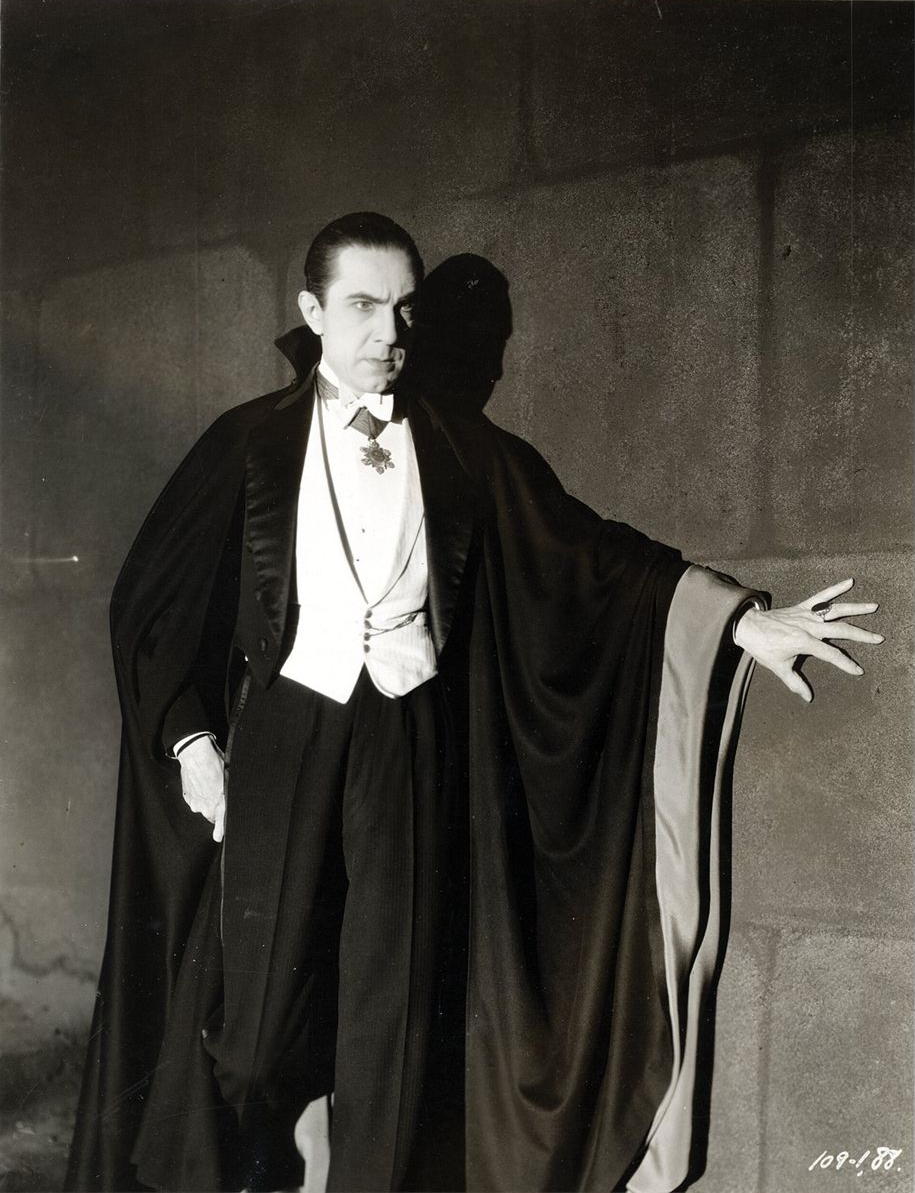
Count Dracula

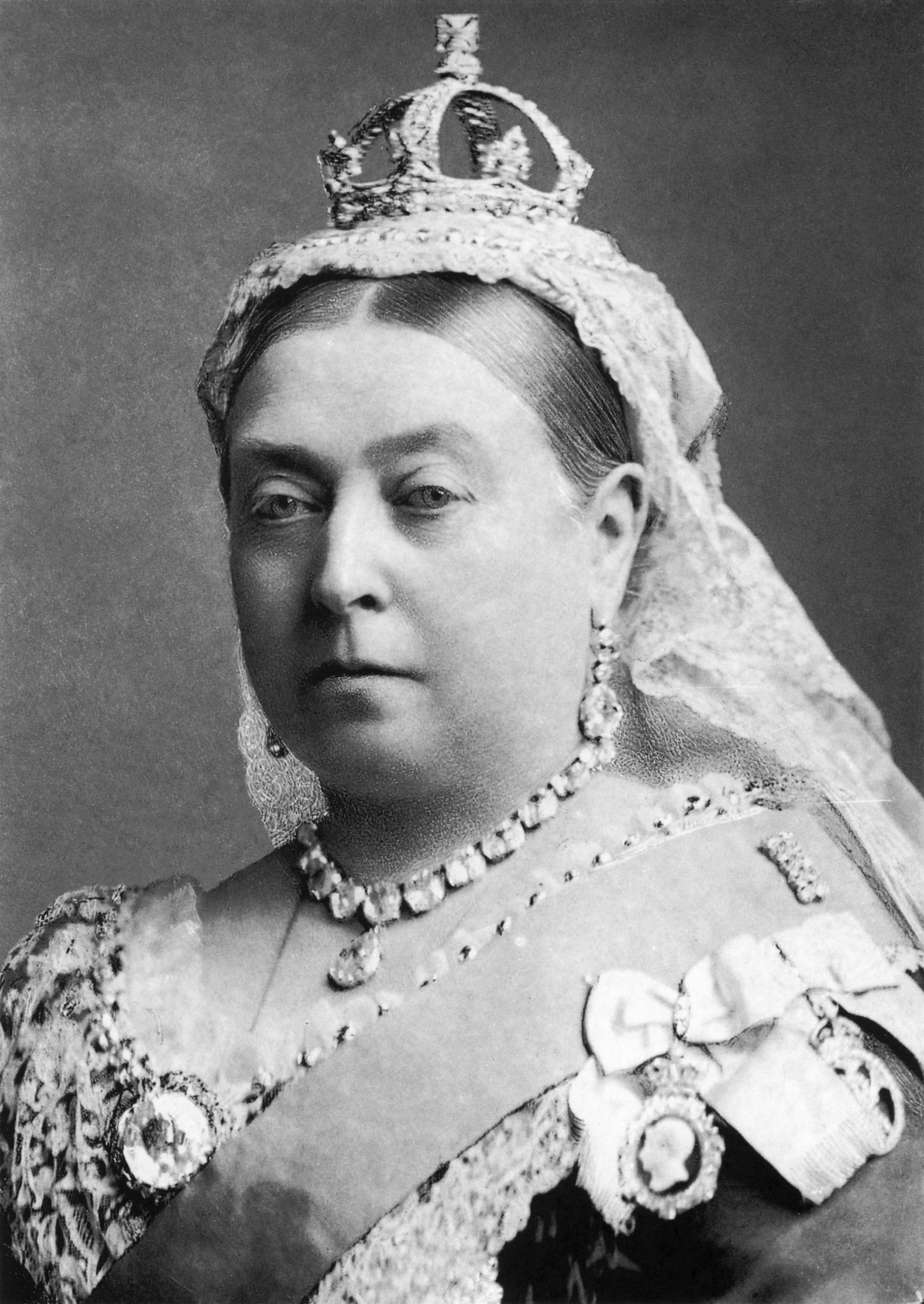
Queen Victoria

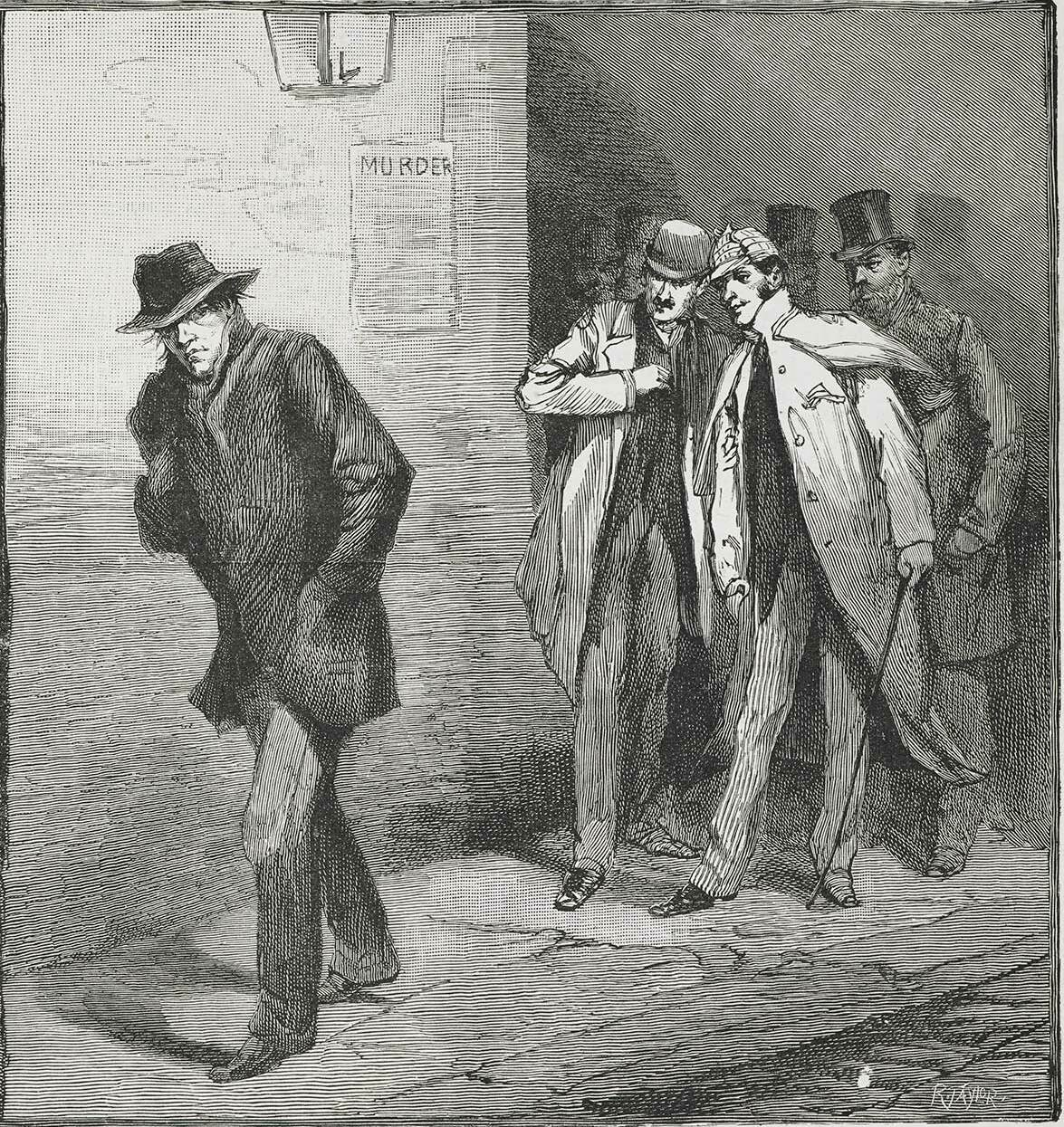
Jack the Ripper

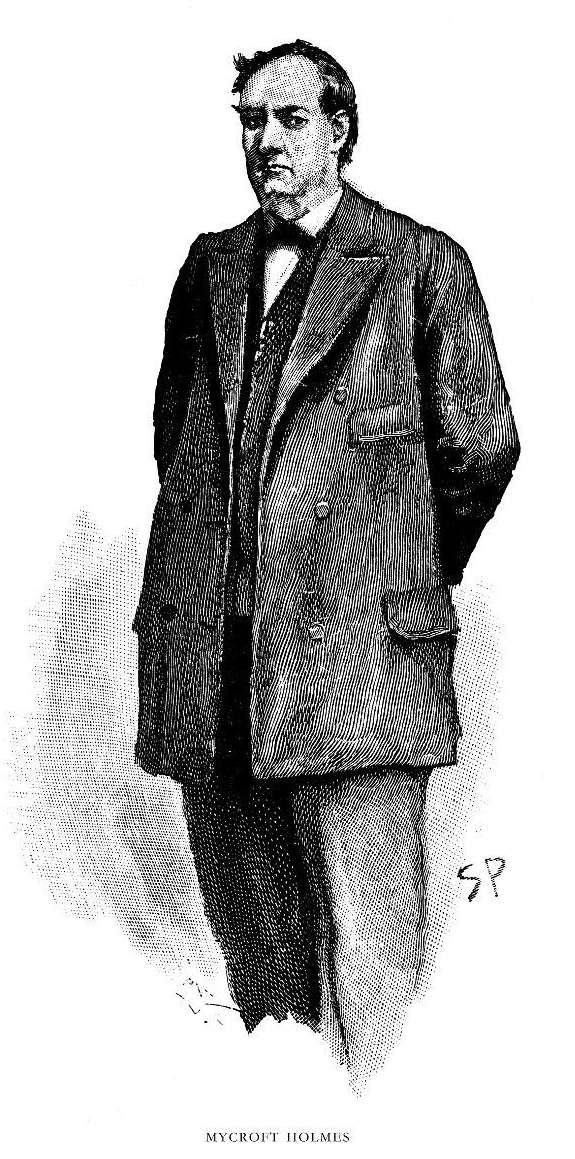
Mycroft Holmes

Some of the main characters used in Anno Dracula

Newman incorporated numerous figures from popular fiction (due to the historical period, many are from works in the public domain).

=== Main characters ===
Character	Creator	Origin
Charles Beauregard	Kim Newman	Original
Penelope Churchward	Kim Newman	Original
Vlad Tepes, Count Dracula	Bram Stoker	Dracula
Daniel Dravot	Rudyard Kipling	The Man Who Would Be King
Mycroft Holmes	Arthur Conan Doyle	The Memoirs of Sherlock Holmes
Kostaki	Alexandre Dumas	The Pale Lady
Inspector Lestrade	Arthur Conan Doyle	A Study in Scarlet
Lord Ruthven	John William Polidori	The Vampyre
Kate Reed	Bram Stoker	Early draft of Dracula
John Seward	Bram Stoker	Dracula
Arthur Holmwood	Bram Stoker	Dracula
Geneviève Dieudonné	Kim Newman	Drachenfels
Count Vardalek	Count Stenbock	The True Story of a Vampire
Inspector Mackenzie	E. W. Hornung	The Amateur Cracksman

=== Minor characters ===
The following characters are only mentioned, or appear only briefly in the novel.

==== From literature ====
Character	Creator	Origin
Kurt Barlow	Stephen King	'Salem's Lot
Brides of Dracula	Bram Stoker	Dracula
Sir Danvers Carew	Robert Louis Stevenson	Strange Case of Dr Jekyll and Mr Hyde
Thomas Carnacki	William Hope Hodgson	Carnacki, the Ghost-Finder
Gunga Din	Rudyard Kipling	Gunga Din
Soames Forsyte	John Galsworthy	The Forsyte Saga
Fu Manchu (referred to as 'The Celestial', 'The Doctor', and 'The Lord of Strange Deaths')	Sax Rohmer	The Mystery of Dr. Fu-Manchu
Griffin	H. G. Wells	The Invisible Man
Basil Hallward	Oscar Wilde	The Picture of Dorian Gray
Mina Harker	Bram Stoker	Dracula
Sherlock Holmes	Arthur Conan Doyle	A Study in Scarlet
Dr Henry Jekyll and Mr Edward Hyde	Robert Louis Stevenson	Strange Case of Dr Jekyll and Mr Hyde
Carmilla Karnstein	Joseph Sheridan Le Fanu	Carmilla
Lestat de Lioncourt	Anne Rice	Interview with the Vampire
Macheath	Bertolt Brecht	The Threepenny Opera
Admiral Sir Mandeville Messervy (presumed ancestor of Admiral Sir Miles Messervy)	Ian Fleming (derived)	Original
Sebastian Moran	Arthur Conan Doyle	The Return of Sherlock Holmes
Doctor Moreau	H. G. Wells	The Island of Doctor Moreau
Professor Moriarty	Arthur Conan Doyle	The Memoirs of Sherlock Holmes
The Murgatroyds	W. S. Gilbert	Ruddigore
Allan Quatermain	H. Rider Haggard	King Solomon's Mines
Rupert of Hentzau	Anthony Hope	The Prisoner of Zenda
Bill Sikes	Charles Dickens	Oliver Twist
Sir Francis Varney	James Malcolm Rymer and Thomas Peckett Prest	Varney the Vampire
Waverly (presumed ancestor of Alexander Waverly)	Sam Rolfe, Norman Felton	The Man from U.N.C.L.E. (derived)
A. J. Raffles	E. W. Hornung	The Amateur Cracksman
Dr Antonio Nikola	Guy Boothby	A Bid for Fortune: or, Dr Nikola's Vendetta
Clayton	Arthur Conan Doyle	The Hound of the Baskervilles
Lord John Roxton	Arthur Conan Doyle	The Lost World
Lucy Westenra	Bram Stoker	Dracula
Abraham Van Helsing	Bram Stoker	Dracula
Renfield	Bram Stoker	Dracula
Jonathan Harker	Bram Stoker	Dracula
Quincey Morris	Bram Stoker	Dracula
Lulu Schon	Frank Wedekind	Pandora's Box
Chandagnac	Kim Newman	Drachenfels
The Old Jago	Arthur Morrison	A Child of the Jago
Ivan Dragomiloff	Jack London	The Assassination Bureau, Ltd
Countess Geschwitz	Frank Wedekind	Pandora's Box
Melissa d'Acques	Kim Newman	Drachenfels
Count Brastov	Charles L. Grant	The Soft Whisper of the Dead
Prince Conrad Vulkan	Robert R. McCammon	They Thirst
Edward Weyland	Suzy McKee Charnas	The Vampire Tapestry
Baron Karnstein	Joseph Sheridan Le Fanu	Carmilla
Lady Adeline Ducayne	Mary Elizabeth Braddon	Good Lady Ducayne
Sarah Kenyon	F. G. Loring	The Tomb of Sarah
Ethelind Fionguala	Julian Hawthorne	Ken's Mystery
Countess Dolingen	Bram Stoker	Dracula's Guest and Other Weird Stories
The Amahagger	H. Rider Haggard	She: A History of Adventure
Ezzelin von Klatka (Azzo von Klatka)	Karl Adolf von Wachsmann	The Mysterious Stranger
Madame de la Rougierre	Joseph Sheridan Le Fanu	Uncle Silas
Clarimonde	Théophile Gautier	La Morte Amoureuse
Martin Hewitt	Arthur Morrison	Martin Hewitt, Investigator
Max Carrados	Ernest Bramah	The Coin of Dionysius
Augustus Van Dusen	Jacques Futrelle	The Thinking Machine
Cotford	Bram Stoker	Early draft of Dracula
Mrs. Warren	George Bernard Shaw	Mrs. Warren's Profession
Berserker the Dog	Bram Stoker	Dracula
Louis Bauer	Patrick Hamilton	Gas Light
A Wessex Cup Winner	Arthur Conan Doyle	The Memoirs of Sherlock Holmes
Mrs Amworth	E. F. Benson	Mrs. Amworth
Henry Wilcox	E. M. Forster	Howards End
General Zaroff	Richard Connell	The Most Dangerous Game
Hawkshaw the Detective	Gus Mager	The Ticket-of-Leave Man
Edward "Ned" Dunn Malone	Howard Waldrop	The Adventure of Grinder's Whistle
Sweeney Todd	Unknown but probably James Malcolm Rymer and/or Thomas Peckett Prest	The String of Pearls
Mr Poole	Robert Louis Stevenson	Strange Case of Dr Jekyll and Mr Hyde
Jacob Marley	Charles Dickens	A Christmas Carol
Caleb Croft (Charles Croydon)	David Chase	The Still Life
Fagin	Charles Dickens	Oliver Twist

==== From film or television ====
Character	Origin
Adam Adamant	Adam Adamant Lives!
Baron Meinster	The Brides of Dracula
Barnabas Collins	Dark Shadows
Elder Chinese Vampire	Mr. Vampire
Prince Mamuwalde	Blacula
Count Orlok	Nosferatu
John Reid	The Lone Ranger
Count Von Krolock	The Fearless Vampire Killers
Count Iorga	Count Yorga, Vampire
Carl Kolchak	The Night Stalker
Don Sebastian de Villanueva	The Black Castle
The Wurdalak	Black Sabbath
Lucian de Terre	The Werewolves of London
Count Mitterhouse	Vampire Circus
Armand Tesla	The Return of the Vampire
Count Duval	El Vampiro
Countess Marya Zaleska	Dracula's Daughter
Asa Vajda	Black Sunday
Martin Cuda	Martin
Anthony	The Night Stalker
Dr Ravna	Kiss of the Vampire
Dr Callistratus	Blood of the Vampire

== Historical people mentioned or appearing as characters ==
- Alessandro Cagliostro
- Alexander Graham Bell
- Alexandra of Denmark
- Alexander Pedachenko
- Alfred Tennyson
- Alfred Waterhouse
- Algernon Charles Swinburne
- Anne Bonny (spelled here as "Anne Bonney")
- Annie Besant
- Annie Chapman
- Antoine Augustin Calmet
- Arnold Toynbee
- Arthur Morrison
- Arthur Sullivan
- Barbara of Cilli (here said to be one of the three Brides of Dracula)
- Beatrice Potter
- Benjamin Franklin
- Billy the Kid
- Bram Stoker (in the world of Anno Dracula it would appear he never wrote the novel "Dracula", since the characters from it are presented here as real people)
- Caligula
- Catherine Eddowes (spelled here as "Catharine" for whatever reason)
- Catherine II of Russia
- Charles Darwin
- Charles Peace
- Charles Warren
- Constance Naden
- Count of St. Germain (however, the idea that he was a vampire comes from Hotel Transylvania and its sequels by Chelsea Quinn Yarbro)
- Daniel Halse
- David Cohen
- Edward Aveling
- Edward Bouverie Pusey
- Edward Bulwer-Lytton
- Edward Carpenter
- Edward VII
- Edward Bairstow
- Eleanor Marx
- Elizabeth Báthory (her description is strongly suggestive of the 1971 German-Belgian horror film Daughters of Darkness)
- Elizabeth Garrett Anderson
- Elizabeth Stride
- Ellen Terry
- Emma Elizabeth Smith
- Eyre Massey Shaw
- Florence Stoker
- Francis Coles
- Frank Harris
- Frederick Abberline
- Frederick Gordon Brown
- Galileo Galilei
- George Bernard Shaw
- George Lusk
- George VI
- George Woodbridge (actor) (though born after the events of the book, he did star in Dracula (1958 film), Dracula: Prince of Darkness & Jack the Ripper (1959 film).)
- Guy Fawkes
- Henry Hyndman
- Henry Labouchère
- Henry Matthews
- Isaac Newton
- Isabella Beeton
- James McNeill Whistler
- Joan of Arc
- John Henry "Doc" Holliday
- John Keble
- John Netley
- John Pizer
- Jonathan Wild
- Joseph Barnett (Jack the Ripper suspect)
- Joseph Grimaldi
- Joseph Merrick
- Leslie Stephen
- Lewis Carroll
- Louis Diemschütz
- Marie Corelli
- Marie Manning (murderer)
- Marie Spartali Stillman
- Mark Pattison (academic)
- Martha Tabram
- Mary Ann Nichols
- Mary Jane Kelly
- Montague Druitt
- Nicolae Iorga
- Olive Schreiner
- Oscar Wilde
- Pat Garrett
- Peter Guthrie Tait
- Prince Albert Victor, Duke of Clarence and Avondale
- Queen Victoria
- Rebecca Kosminski (a possible reference to Aaron Kosminski)
- Richard Jefferies
- Robert Anderson (Scotland Yard official)
- Robert Cunninghame-Graham
- Robert Donston Stephenson (addressed as "D'Onston" here)
- Robert James Lees
- Robert Knox
- Rose Mylett (her daughter Lily also appears)
- Samuel Barnett (reformer)
- Sir Frederick Treves, 1st Baronet
- Sophia Jex-Blake
- Theodore Watts-Dunton
- Thomas Bond (British surgeon)
- Thomas Carlyle
- Thomas Edison
- Thomas Henry Huxley
- Thomas John Barnardo
- Virgil
- Vlad Tepeş (here said to be the same person as Dracula)
- W. S. Gilbert
- Walter Sickert
- William Booth
- William Gull
- William Holman Hunt (his wife Edith Waugh is also mentioned)
- William Le Queux
- William Morris
- William Thick
- William Thomas Stead
- Wynne Edwin Baxter

== Critical reception ==
From the book cover: "The most comprehensive, brilliant, dazzlingly audacious vampire novel to date." (Locus); "A tour de fource which succeeds brilliantly." (The Times); "A marvellous marriage of political satire, melodramatic intrigue, gothic horror, and alternative history." (The Independent).

Upon its original publication, the book received positive reviews. Kirkus Reviews praised Anno Dracula for rising above an "overdone" genre with its "immense physiological detail shoring up the reality of the undead" as well as praising Newman’s use of other Victorian characters "mingling in a fogbound milieu". David Krugman of The Telegraph said that the book did not have many "true scares" but also mentioned that it is well-written and well-plotted.

In later reviews, Milo of The Guardian also noted the book's plot and its well-thought twists. CT Phipps of Grimdark Magazine observed the novel's atmosphere and compared its grimdark setting with the works of Alan Moore.
