= Sweeney Todd (ballet) =

- Choreographer: John Cranko
- Music: Malcolm Arnold
- Based on: The String of Pearls
- Premiere: 10 December 1959
- Original ballet company: Royal Ballet
- Characters: Sweeney Todd; Tobias Ragg; Johanna; Mark Ingestre; Colonel Jeffrey
- Design: Alix Stone
- Setting: Fleet Street, London
- Genre: Horror

The ballet Sweeney Todd, Op. 68 by Malcolm Arnold was completed in 1959. It is a one-act ballet based on the legend of Sweeney Todd, a villain in The String of Pearls serial. The scenario and original choreography were by John Cranko and the scenery and costumes by Alix Stone in the style of Victorian toy theatres. It was first performed by the Royal Ballet touring company on 10 December 1959, at the Shakespeare Memorial Theatre, Stratford-upon-Avon, with the Royal Opera House Orchestra conducted by John Lanchbery. The dancers who created the roles in the first production were Donald Britton (Sweeney Todd), Johaar Mosaval (Tobias), Elizabeth Anderton (Johanna), Desmond Doyle (Mark Ingestre), Ian Hamilton (Colonel Jeffrey).

Paul R.W Jackson noted the ingenious interweaving and development of the themes or motifs used for each of the main characters. "The grisly opening prelude turned into Todd's theme, while Johanna's music became an ingratiating waltz for a pas de deux".

The first complete recording was issued in 2025, with the BBC Concert Orchestra, conductor Martin Yates.

== Concert suites ==
In 1984, the composer David Ellis compiled a 20-minute concert suite, Op. 68a from the ballet in collaboration with the composer. The suite was first performed on 19 June 1990 at Bristol University with the University Chamber Orchestra. A shortened version of the suite was arranged for brass band by Phillip Littlemore. It had its first performance on 22 October 2006 at the Malcolm Arnold Festival, Derngate in Northampton by the Rushden Windmill Band led by Richard Graves.
