= The String of Pearls =

Book by James Malcolm Rymer

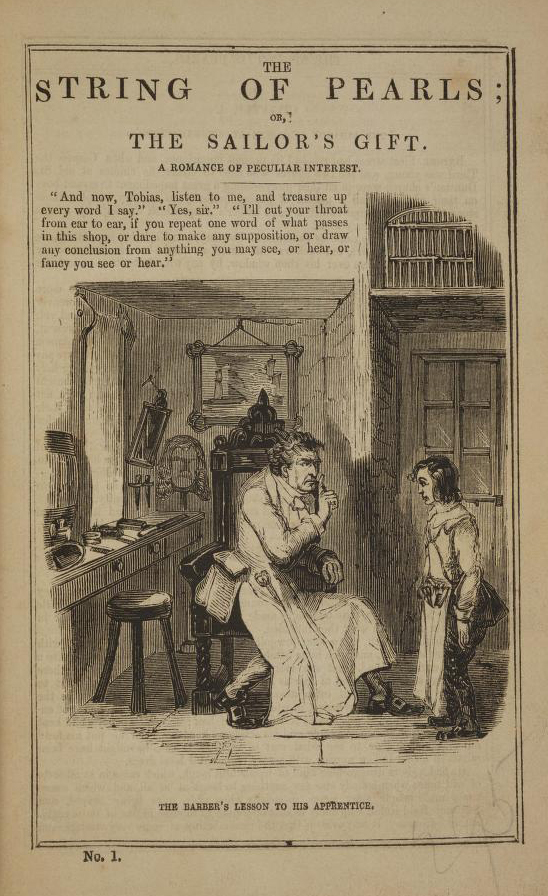
- Page from The String of Pearls; or, The Sailor’s Gift, 1850
- Author: Unknown but probably James Malcolm Rymer and/or Thomas Peckett Prest
- Working title: The Barber of Fleet Street. A Domestic Romance
- Language: English
- Subject: Sweeney Todd
- Genre: Fiction
- Set in: London
- Published: 1846–47 by Edward Lloyd; 1850 as a book
- Publication place: United Kingdom
- Media type: Print (Penny dreadful)
- Pages: 732 pp (Book)
- OCLC: 830944639
- LC Class: PR5285.R99
- Text: The String of Pearls at Wikisource

The String of Pearls: A Domestic Romance (alternatively titled The Sailor's Gift) is a story first published as a penny dreadful serial from 1846 to 1847. The main character of the story is Sweeney Todd, "the Demon Barber of Fleet Street". The story was the character's first literary appearance.

Todd is a barber who murders his customers and gives their corpses to Mrs. Lovett, his partner in crime, who bakes their flesh into meat pies. His barber shop is situated in Fleet Street, London, next to St. Dunstan's church, and is connected to Lovett's pie shop in nearby Bell Yard by means of an underground passage. Todd kills his victims by pulling a lever while they are in his barber chair, which makes them fall backward through a revolving trapdoor and generally causes them to break their necks or skulls on the cellar floor below. If the victims are still alive, he goes to the basement and "polishes them off" by slitting their throats with his straight razor.

== Synopsis ==
The story is set in London during the year 1785. The plot concerns the strange disappearance of a sailor named Lieutenant Thornhill, last seen entering Sweeney Todd's establishment on Fleet Street. Thornhill was bearing a gift of a string of pearls to a girl named Johanna Oakley on behalf of her missing lover, Mark Ingestrie, who is presumed lost at sea. One of Thornhill's seafaring friends, Colonel Jeffrey, is alerted to the disappearance of Thornhill by his faithful dog, Hector, and investigates his whereabouts. He is joined by Johanna, who wants to know what happened to Mark.

Johanna's suspicions of Sweeney Todd's involvement cause her to disguise herself as a boy and become Todd's employee after his last assistant, a young boy named Tobias Ragg, has been incarcerated in a madhouse for accusing Todd of murder. Soon, after Todd has dismembered the corpses of his victims, Mrs. Lovett creates her meat pies from leftover flesh. While the bodies are burning in the oven, a ghastly and intolerable smell reeks from the pie shop chimney. Eventually, the extent of Todd's activities is uncovered when the dismembered remains of hundreds of his victims are discovered in the crypt underneath St. Dunstan's church. Meanwhile, Mark, who has been imprisoned in the cellar beneath the pie shop and made to work as the cook, escapes via the lift used to bring the pies up from the cellar into the pie shop. Here he makes the following startling announcement to the customers of that establishment:

"Ladies and gentlemen – I fear that what I am going to say will spoil your appetites; but the truth is beautiful at all times, and I have to state that Mrs. Lovett's pies are made of human flesh!"

Mrs. Lovett is then poisoned by Sweeney Todd, who is subsequently apprehended and hanged. Johanna marries Mark.

== Literary history ==
The String of Pearls: A Romance was published in 18 weekly parts, in Edward Lloyd's The People's Periodical and Family Library, issues 7–24, 21 November 1846 to 20 March 1847. It is frequently attributed to Thomas Peckett Prest, but has been more recently been reassigned to James Malcolm Rymer. The story was published in book form in 1850 as "The String of Pearls", subtitled "The Barber of Fleet Street. A Domestic Romance". This expanded version of the story was 732 pages long, and its conclusion differs greatly from that of the original serial publication: Todd escapes from prison after being sentenced to death but, after many further adventures, is finally shot dead while fleeing from the authorities. In later years, there were many different literary, stage and eventually movie adaptations which renamed, further expanded and often drastically altered the original story.

A scholarly, annotated edition of The String of Pearls was published in 2007 by the Oxford University Press with the title Sweeney Todd: The Demon Barber of Fleet Street, edited by Robert Mack.

Industrialisation is a theme that contributes to the story. Sweeney Todd owns a barber shop in the middle of one of the busiest industrial parts of the growing city of London. Industrialism resulted in an increasing crime rate, which was exploited by the penny dreadful stories.

== Historical background ==
While the author of String of Pearls is unknown, there are many theories surrounding its influences. During the 19th century, when this story was first written, a semi-common trade was what was termed a barber-surgeon. Barber-surgeons were medical practitioners trained not by schooling but by apprenticeship, and they were sometimes illiterate. Surgery eventually became an established profession of its own and the two were separated legally by King George II in Britain during 1745.

== Speculated influences ==
=== Le Théâtre des Antiquités de Paris ===
The 1612 French historical nonfiction book Le Théâtre des Antiquités de Paris by Father Jacques du Breul contains a section titled De la maison des Marmousets (From the house of the Marmousets) that mentions a "murderous pastry cook" who incorporates into his pie the meat of a man he murdered due to its alleged dietary benefits.

=== Historical basis for Sweeney Todd ===
It has been speculated that, "Joseph Fouché, who served as Minister of Police in Paris from 1799 to 1815, had records in the archives of police that explored murders committed in the 1800s by a Parisian barber". Fouché mentioned that the barber was in league with "a neighbouring pastry cook, who made pies out of the victims and sold them for human consumption". There is question about the authenticity of this account, "yet the tale was republished in 1824 under the headline A Terrific Story of the Rue de Le Harpe, Paris in The Tell Tale, a London magazine. Perhaps Thomas Prest, scouring publications for ideas, read about the Paris case and stored it away for later use."

Sweeney Todd's story also appears in The Newgate Calendar, originally a bulletin of executions produced by the keeper of Newgate Prison, the title of which was appropriated by chapbooks, popular pamphlets full of entertaining, often violent criminal activities. Despite this, there is no mention of Todd's trial or execution in official records, and thus no real evidence that he ever existed.

No public records prove any existence of a London barber by the name of Sweeney during the 18th century or of a barber shop located on Fleet Street. There were many word-of-mouth, true crime and horror stories at the time however, reported in "The Old Bailey" section of the Times of London as well as other daily newspapers. News also commonly travelled by word of mouth as the majority of the population was still illiterate, and could become embellished in the retelling from person to person. Such news might still be assumed factual because there was no way of proving otherwise at the time.

=== Charles Dickens ===
In Charles Dickens' The Pickwick Papers (1836–37), Pickwick's cockney servant Sam Weller states that a pieman used cats "for beefsteak, veal and kidney, 'cording to the demand", and recommends that people should buy pies only "when you know the lady as made it, and is quite sure it ain't kitten". Dickens expanded on the idea of using non-traditional sources for meat pie in Martin Chuzzlewit (1843–44). This was published two years before The String of Pearls (1846–47) and included a character by the name of Tom Pinch, who feels lucky that his own "evil genius did not lead him into the dens of any of those preparers of cannibalic pastry, who are represented in many country legends as doing a lively retail business in the metropolis" and worries that John Westlock will "begin to be afraid that I have strayed into one of those streets where the countrymen are murdered; and that I have been made into meat pies, or some such horrible thing". Peter Haining suggested in a 1993 book that Dickens was inspired by knowledge of the "real" Sweeney Todd, but that he chose not to mention him, in case some of his victims' relatives were still alive.

== Adaptations ==
=== Theatre ===
- 1847: The String of Pearls, or The Fiend of Fleet Street is a play by George Dibdin-Pitt.
- 1970: Sweeney Todd: The Demon Barber of Fleet Street is a play by Christopher Bond
- 1979: Sweeney Todd: The Demon Barber of Fleet Street is a Broadway musical by Stephen Sondheim and Hugh Wheeler.
- 1982: Sweeney Todd: The Demon Barber of Fleet Street is an official filmed recording of the Broadway musical, starring Angela Lansbury as Mrs. Lovett.

=== Film ===
- 1926: Sweeney Todd
- 1928: Sweeney Todd is an adaptation of the 1847 play.
- 1936: Sweeney Todd: The Demon Barber of Fleet Street is an adaptation of the 1847 play.
- 1970: Bloodthirsty Butchers
- 2007: Sweeney Todd: The Demon Barber of Fleet Street is an adaptation of the 1979 musical, and is directed by Tim Burton.

=== Television ===
- 1970: Mystery & Imagination, a British anthology series on Thames Television featuring an adaptation of Sweeney Todd starring Freddie Jones.
- 1997: The Tale of Sweeney Todd is a T.V. movie by Showtime, starring Ben Kingsley. It uses the characters Sweeney Todd and Mrs. Lovett and the general premise, but is an original story.
- 2016: In Salem, Thomas is a Sweeney Todd-like character who is a barber and mortician. He has implied that he uses human meat in his meat pies.
