= William Morris Gallery =

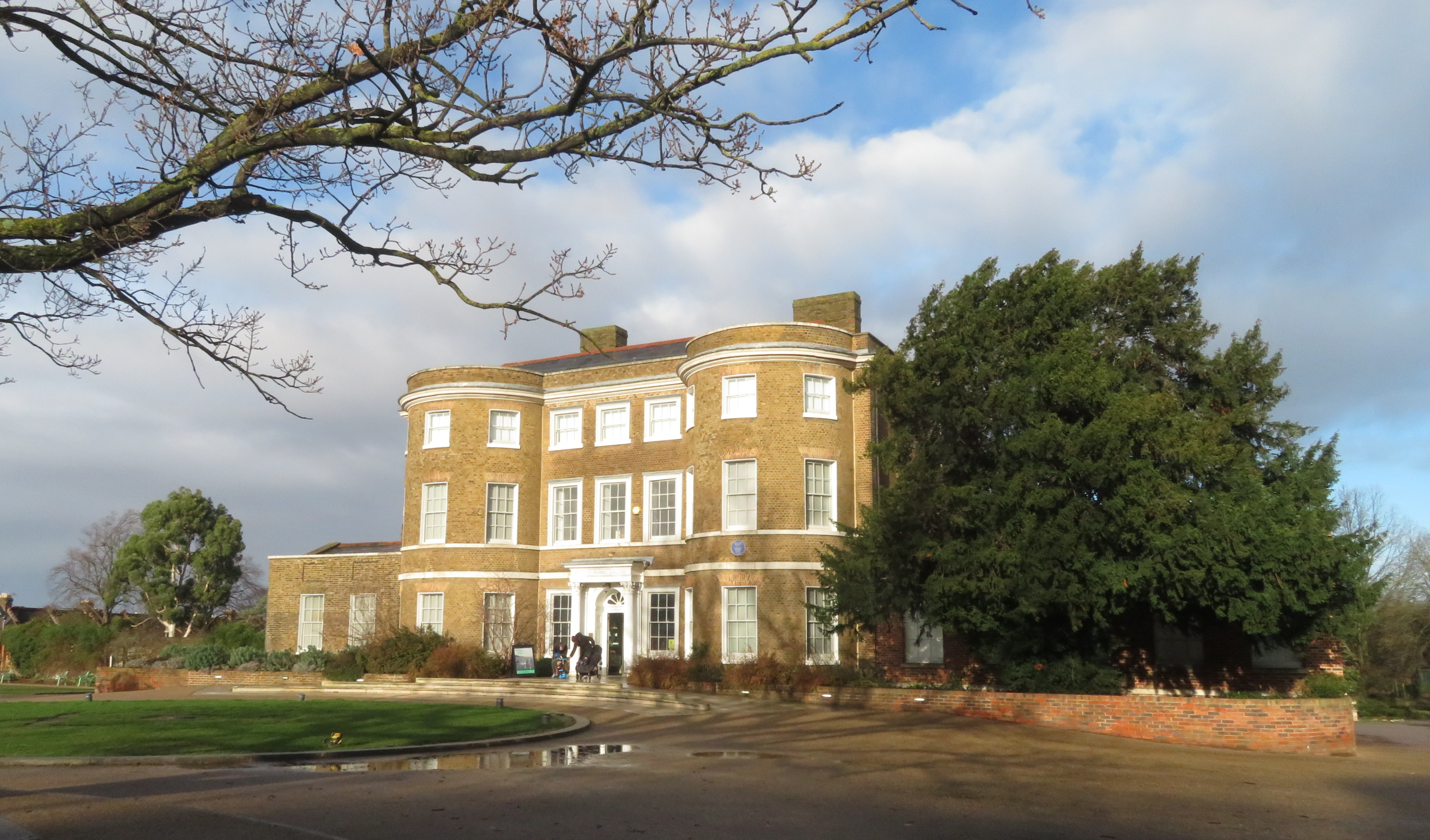
- Front view of Water House

- Location within London Borough of Waltham Forest
- Established: 1950; 76 years ago
- Location: Walthamstow, London, E17
- Coordinates: 51°35′29″N 0°01′13″W
- Type: Museum and exhibitions
- Public transit access: Walthamstow Central; 123
- Website: wmgallery.org.uk

Listed Building – Grade II*
- Designated: 19 October 1951
- Reference no.: 1065620

The William Morris Gallery is a museum devoted to the life and works of William Morris, an English Arts and Crafts designer and early socialist. It is located in Walthamstow at Water House, a substantial Grade II* listed Georgian home. The extensive grounds of the building are a public park, known as Lloyd Park.

== Collections and exhibits ==
The William Morris Gallery holds the most comprehensive collection of objects relating to all aspects of Morris's life and work, including his work as a designer, a writer and a social activist.

The permanent exhibit is divided into 9 rooms:

- 1. Meet the Man, Morris' early life and background;
- 2. Starting Out, Morris' early works and his influences including Pre-Raphaelite artists and Art Critic John Ruskin;
- 3. Morris & Co, the formation and ideals of Morris' design company;
- 4. The Workshop, the design and manufacturing techniques championed by Morris;
- 5. The Shop, an interactive gallery exploring the experience of shopping for Morris' creations in Victorian London;
- 6. Ideal Book, Morris' foray into printing and book design includes an original printing of Earthly Paradise by William Morris;
- 7. Fighting for a Cause, Morris' social activism and socialist beliefs;
- 8. Arts and Crafts, the movement that Morris founded;
- 9. Frank Brangwyn, works from the student of William Morris.

The museum is also used as a learning facility with educational exhibitions from artists such as Eamon Everall of the stuckist movement.

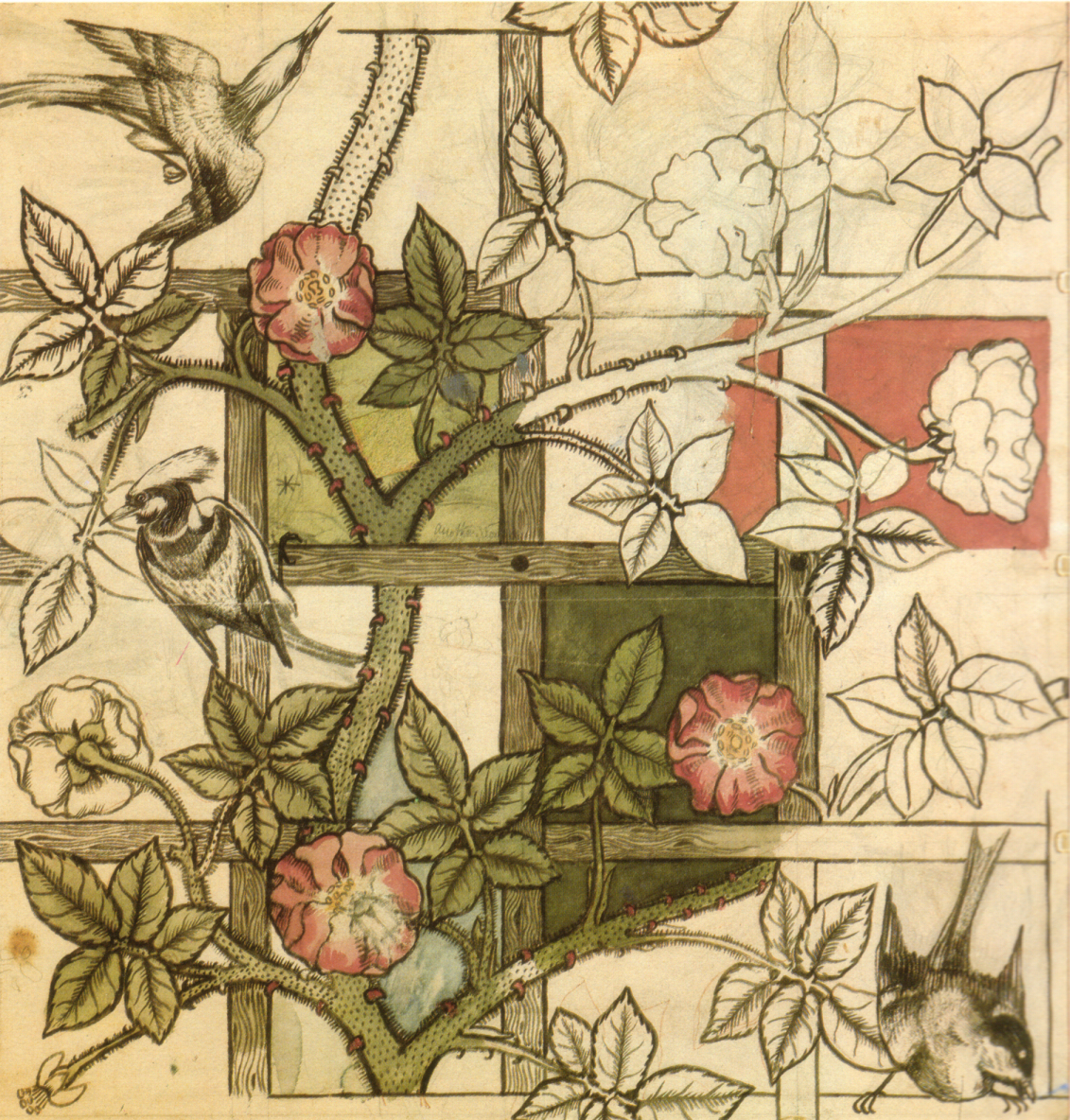
Original design of "Trellis Wallpaper"

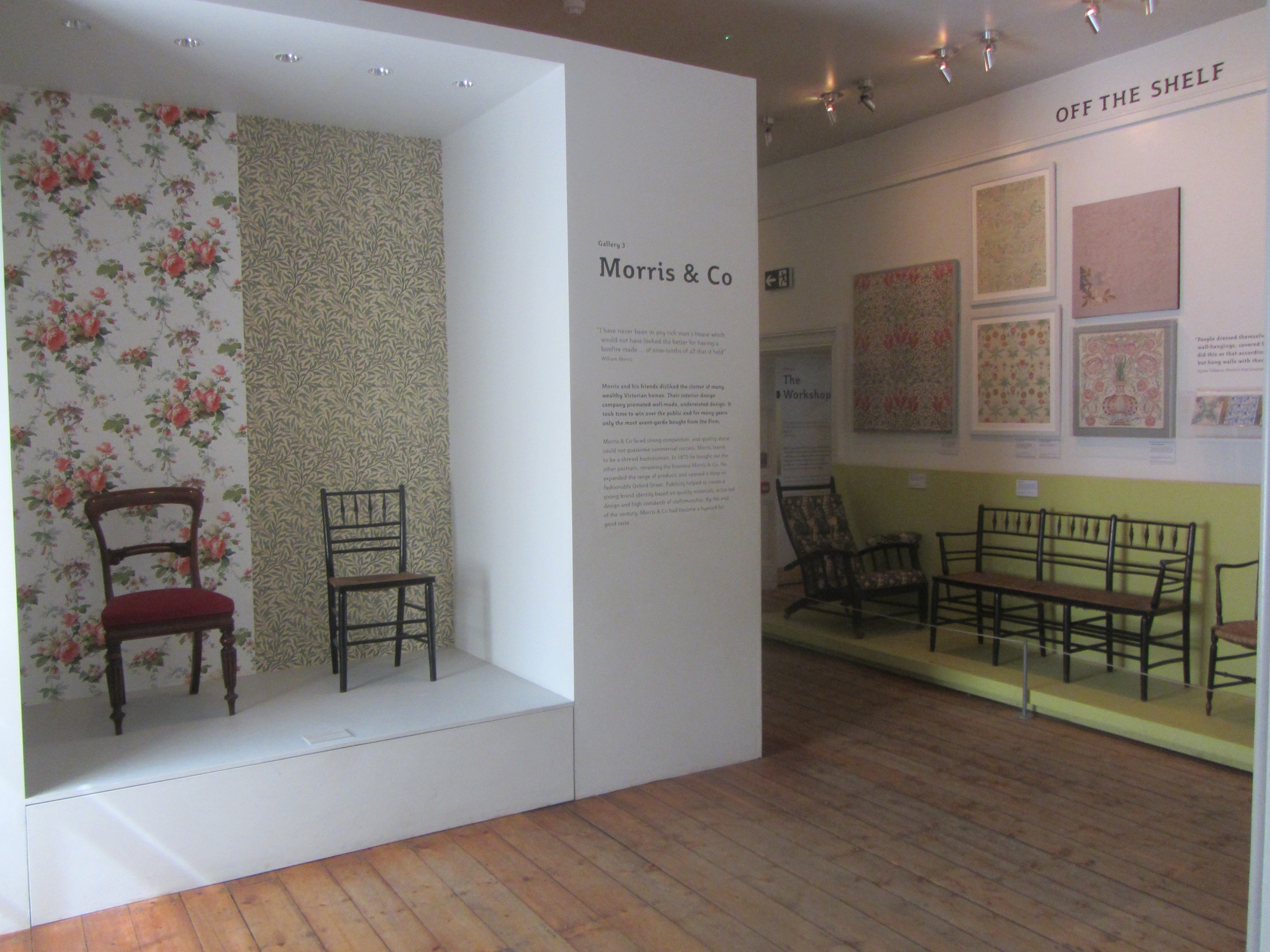
The Morris & Co Room

== History ==
Water House was constructed in 1762 and was Morris' family home in his teenage years from 1848 to 1856. The building and its grounds were sold on to newspaper proprietor Edward Lloyd in 1856, whose son donated the house and grounds (which then became Lloyd Park) to Walthamstow in 1900. The building was not opened as a museum until 1950, by Prime Minister Clement Attlee.

In 2007, as a result of cost saving exercises, by owners Waltham Forest Borough Council, the museum's opening hours were cut back to allow staffing to be reduced. This broke a stipulation of gifts by Sir Frank Brangwyn, that works should be on view for a minimum amount of time weekly. And a number of campaigners, including former Culture Secretary Chris Smith, were concerned that this would lead to the museum's closure.

=== Redevelopment ===
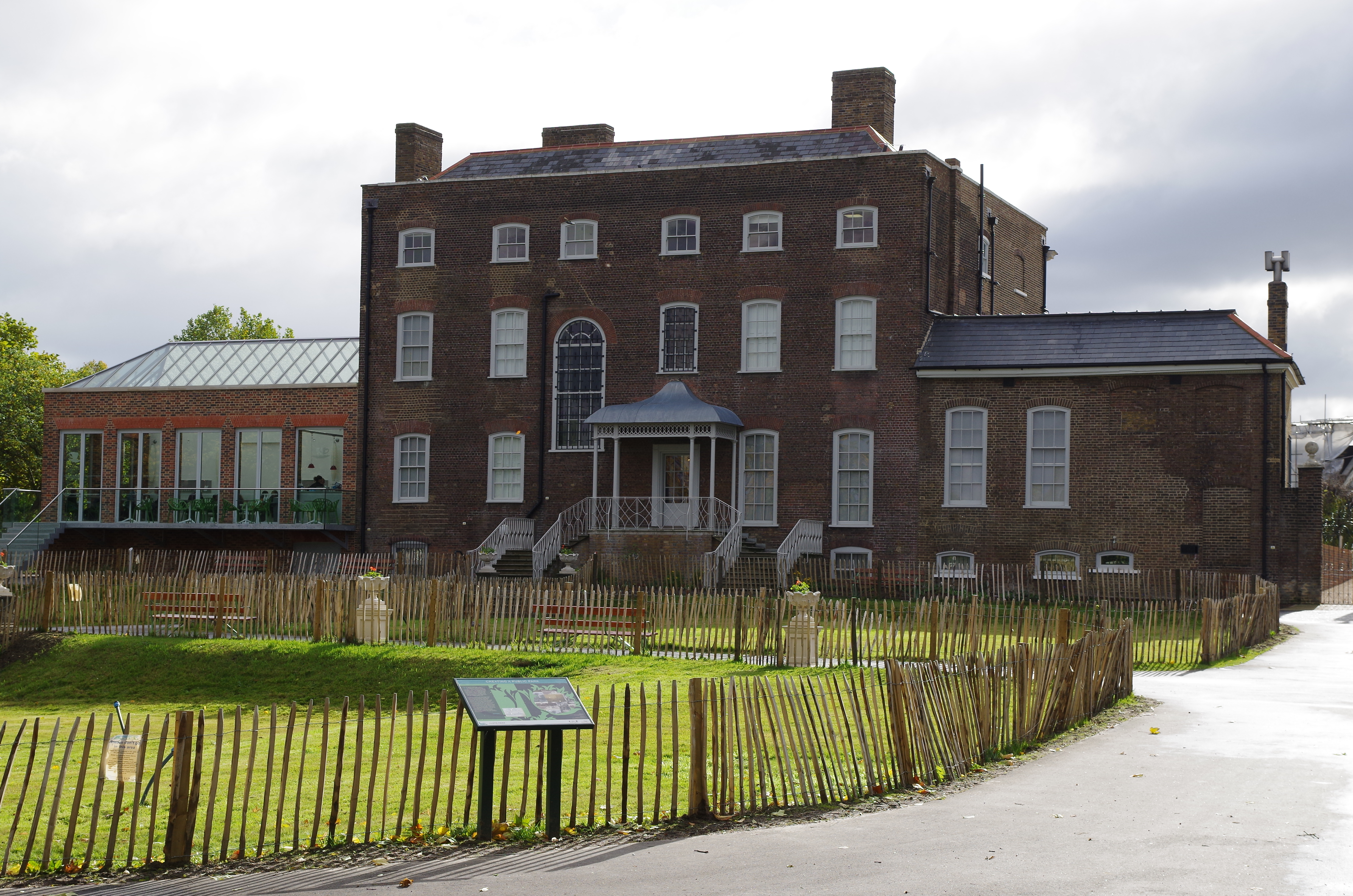
Garden side, showing the new extension on the left

In March 2009 the Heritage Lottery Fund awarded the gallery £80,000 to enable detailed proposals for redevelopment. In Autumn 2010 this proposal was successful in securing a second funding of £1.523 million from the Heritage Lottery Fund, which was matched with £1.5 million from the London Borough of Waltham Forest. Subsequently, a major redevelopment was carried out.

The building was closed for refurbishment and redevelopment in 2011 and was reopened in August 2012.

The redevelopment of Water House, designed by architects and exhibition designers Pringle Richards Sharratt, included a new wing "inspired by Georgian & Victorian precedents" containing a 60 m^{2} (650 sq ft) gallery for temporary exhibitions as well as a tearoom with windows incorporating a Morris ‘Thistle’ frit pattern and a balcony that overlooks the gardens.

Grayson Perry's 15-metre-long The Walthamstow Tapestry was displayed at the gallery from 2 August to 30 September 2012.

=== Recognition ===
In 2013 the William Morris Gallery won national prizes for Museum of the Year, and the Museum and Heritage Shows's award for Best Permanent Exhibition.

== Lloyd Park ==
Lloyd Park
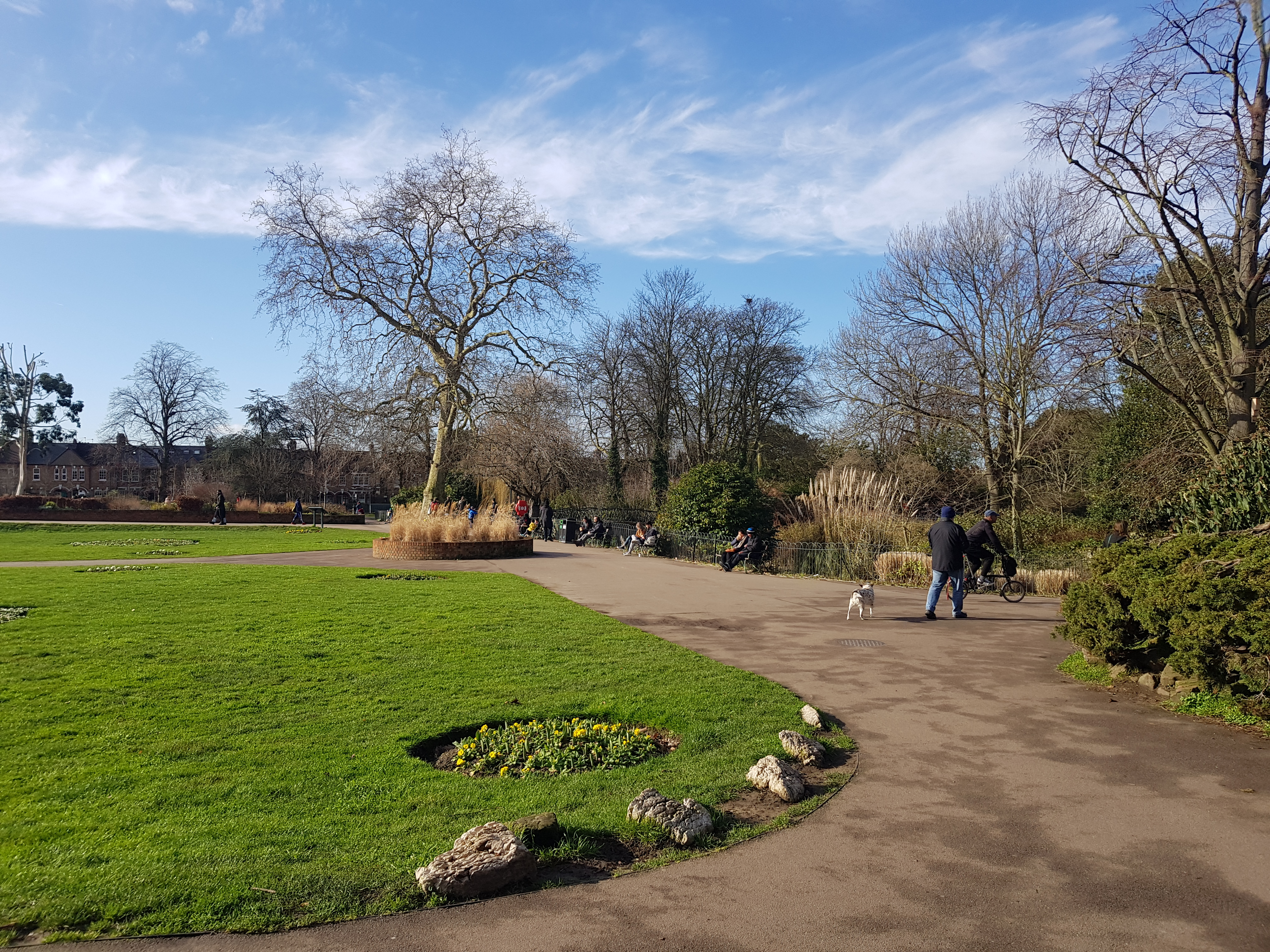
- Visitors: 1 million per year
- Open: From 7.30am, daily.
- Awards: Green Flag Award
- Website: www.walthamforest.gov.uk/content/lloyd-park

The gardens of Water House, now known as Lloyd Park, are a public park maintained by Waltham Forest Borough Council. The park includes an area surrounded by a moat which pre-dates the Georgian house.

The park's facilities include a café, public toilets, artist studios, a play area, a bowls pavilion, tennis courts, skate park and basketball practice areas. The park also hosts a regular food market, Lloyd Park Market.

=== Waltham Forest Theatre ===
A pavilion was built in 1937, on the artificial island created by the moat, and converted into the Waltham Forest Theatre in 1972. The theatre was popular through to the 1990s and local actor Jack Watling presented several seasons of plays there. However, it eventually fell into disuse and was demolished in 2011 as part of wider redevelopment.

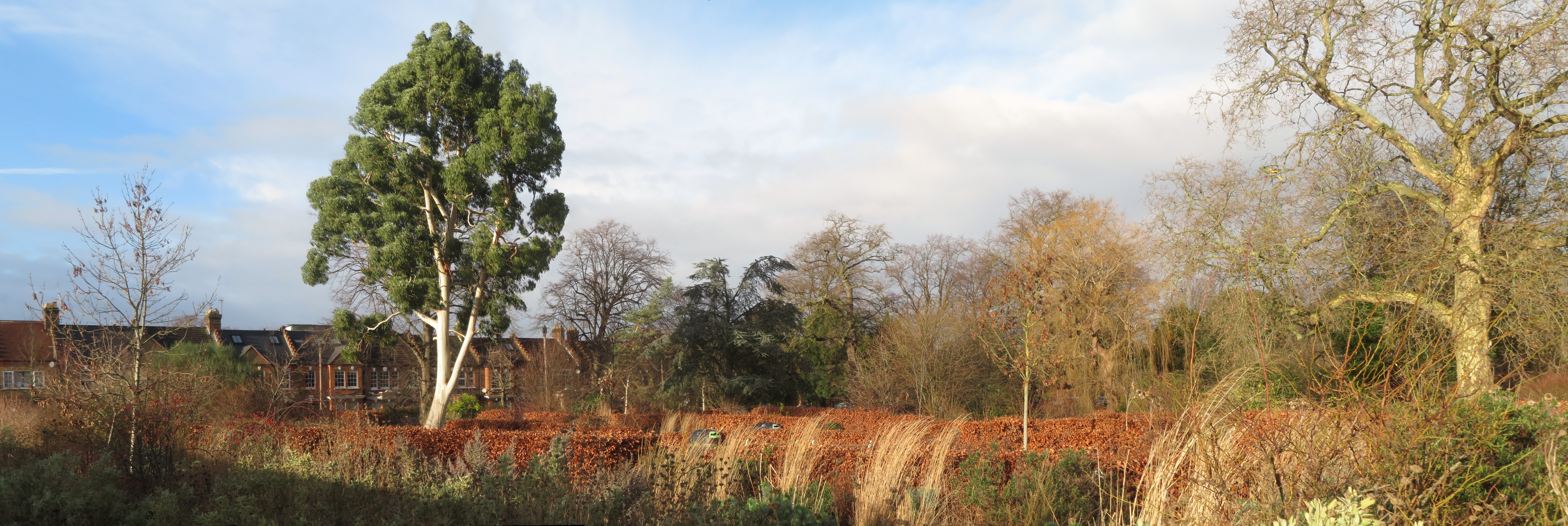
View on Lloyd park behind William Morris gallery, 2023

== See also ==
- List of single-artist museums
