= Sweeney Todd (1928 film) =

1928 film by Walter West

- Directed by: Walter West
- Based on: The String of Pearls; or, The Fiend of Fleet Street; 1847 play by George Dibdin-Pitt
- Produced by: Harry Rowson
- Starring: Moore Marriott; Iris Darbyshire; Judd Green; Charles Ashton
- Production company: QTS Productions
- Distributed by: Ideal Films
- Release date: September 1928
- Running time: 6,200 feet 73 minutes
- Country: United Kingdom
- Languages: Silent; English intertitles

Sweeney Todd is a 1928 British silent crime film directed by Walter West and starring Moore Marriott, Judd Green and Iris Darbyshire. It was adapted from a popular 1847 stage play by George Dibdin-Pitt called The String of Pearls, or The Fiend of Fleet Street, which in turn was based on an anonymous story called The String of Pearls: A Romance that was serialized in magazine format in 1846. This was the first time the story was adapted into a play, and it featured a surprise twist ending that does not appear in later stage versions of the Sweeney Todd legend. It was filmed entirely on set at Islington Studios.

== Plot ==
A barber named Sweeney Todd slits the throats of his unsuspecting customers, robs them and then dumps their bodies down into his cellar through a trapdoor. He and his partner in crime, Mrs. Lovett, cut up the bodies and use the pieces to make meat pies which she then sells in her bakery shop. In the end, it all turns out to be just a bad dream.

== Cast ==
- Moore Marriott as Sweeney Todd
- Iris Darbyshire as Amelia Lovett
- Judd Green as Simon Podge
- Charles Ashton as Mark Ingestre
- Zoe Palmer as Johanna
- Philip Hewland as Ben Wagstaffe
- Harry Lorraine as Mick Todd
- Brian Glenny as Tobias Wragg
- Lucius Blake as Sambo (credited as J. Blake)

== Bibliography ==
- Low, Rachel. The History of British Film: Volume IV, 1918–1929. Routledge, 1997.
- Wood, Linda. British Films, 1927-1939. British Film Institute, 1986.
