= Thomas Peckett Prest =

British writer, journalist and musician (1810–1859)

Thomas Peckett (or Preskett) Prest (probable dates 1810–1859) was a British author, journalist and musician He was a prolific producer of penny dreadfuls and was known as a skilled author in the horror genre. He is now remembered as the co-creator (with James Malcolm Rymer) of the fictional Sweeney Todd, the 'demon barber' immortalized in his The String of Pearls, as well as the co-author with Rymer of Varney the Vampire. He wrote under pseudonyms including Bos, a takeoff of Charles Dickens' own pen name, Boz. He also was noted to have a style similar to Dickens. Before joining Edward Lloyd's publishing factory, Prest had made a name for himself as a talented musician.

== Style ==
Prest was noted to follow a similar style to Dickens, often outright imitating his work like he did with Oliver Twist. His work was also noticed to not have as strong a narrative or continuity throughout its story, little description and lots of action in order to ensure people would keep returning week after week and not grow bored. He also was noted to avoid the social commentary that Dickens often had as an important element of his work. It is possible he also borrowed idea from French folklore as the character Sweeney Todd has been noted to bear similarities with a popular French folktale at the time of it being published.

== Authorship question ==
Unfortunately Lloyd's business practices did not allow authors to put their name on their published work, due to this there is disagreement over the authorship of many works published by his company. In particular the authors of Varney the Vampire and The String of Pearls are much debated. E.F. Bleiler has argued that Rymer is most likely the author of Varney, due to the differences in how he wrote dialogue compared to Prest, as did Louis James, the latter citing a piece of the manuscript in Rymer's handwriting.

The String of Pearls is usually attributed to either Prest or James Malcolm Rymer, however other contenders such as George Mcfarren or Edward Lloyd have been suggested. The first claim of Prest being the author came in 1894 followed by a 1901 response claiming that Rymer was the true author. Although historically attributed to Prest recently arguments have been made that Rymer should be considered the true author of The String of Pearls. It is commonly noted that these works were cooperatively written and so they usually are both considered co-authors of the piece.

== Bibliography ==
- The Miller and His Men; or, The Bohemian Banditti (1831)
- The Penny Pickwick (1839) (lampoon of The Pickwick Papers)
- Gallant Tom: or, the Perils of a Sailor (1841)
- The Life and Adventures of Oliver Twiss, the Workhouse Boy (1841) (lampoon of Oliver Twist)
- David Copperful (a lampoon of David Copperfield)
- Nickelas Nicklebery (a lampoon of Nicholas Nickleby)
- Ela, the Outcast; or, The Gipsy of Rosemary Dell. A Romance of Thrilling Interest (1841)
- The Hebrew Maiden; or, The Lost Diamond (1841)
- Ernestine de Lacy; or, The Robber's Foundling. An Old English Romance (1842)
- Adeline; or, The Grave of the Forsaken. A Domestic Romance (1842)
- The Old House of West Street (1844)
- The Smuggler King; or, The Foundling of the Wreck. A Nautico-Domestic Romance (1844)
- Gilbert Copley, the Reprobate. A Domestic Romance (1844)
- The String of Pearls: A Romance (1846)
- The Death Ship, Or, The Pirate's Bride and the Maniac of the Deep: A Nautical Romance (1846)
- The Jew and the Foundling: A Romance (1847)
- The Harvest Home: A Romance (1850)
- The Brigand; or, The Mountain Chief: A Romance (1851)
- The Robber's Wife: A Domestic Romance (1852)
- Schamyl; or, The Wild Woman of Circassia. An Original Historical Romance (1856)
- The Maniac Father; or, The Victims of Seduction
- Varney the Vampire, or the Feast of Blood
- Vice and its Victims; or, Phoebe the Peasant's Daughter
- The Sketch Book (imitation of Dicken's Sketche's by Boz)
- The Gipsy of Rosemary Dell
