= James Malcolm Rymer =

British writer (1814–1884)

James Malcolm Rymer (1814–1884) was a British 19th-century writer of penny dreadfuls, and is the probable co-author with Thomas Peckett Prest of both Varney the Vampire (1847) and The String of Pearls (1847), in which the notorious villain Sweeney Todd makes his literary debut.

== History ==
Information about Rymer throughout his life is difficult to find, possibly due to his infamous shyness and desire to escape the public eye, as well as his usage of many pseudonyms such as Merry or Errym. He was of Scottish descent, though born in Clerkenwell, London on 1 February 1814 to a working-class family. He later in life became a civil engineer of which he was still noted to follow as his profession in 1841. He married Caroline Huttley in 1839 and they had their first child in 1840.

Rymer began his literary career in 1842 when he began editing the Queen's Magazine, of which it is speculated he wrote the majority of the published articles. After only five months he was forced to declare the magazine a failure and was forced to seek out other work which he eventually found under the employ of Edward Lloyd. During this time, Rymer made a name for himself with the publication of Ada the Betrayed in 1843. This would later be followed up with the popular serials Varney the Vampire from 1845 to 1847 and The String of Pearls from 1846 to 1847 both of which serialized in People's Periodical and Family Library. Edward Lloyd moved on from publishing penny dreadfuls and began publishing newspapers in 1850, that same year a new publication of A String of Pearls was released with extra content. After this Rymer instead did work for Reynold's Miscellany and befriended the owner of the publication George W. M. Reynolds. During this time in 1855 he wrote The Unspeakable, which he claimed to partly be a biography; because of this, some have suggested Rymer suffered from a stutter in real life.

His wife Huttley is speculated to have died in 1853 and he remarried in 1859 to Sarah Rebecca Carpenter. His son youngest George also passed away 1865, both of these deaths led to a drop in his writing and a halt in all his work in 1869. He and Carpenter would move to Sussex in 1870 and take over the Sea House Hotel there. In 1877 he made his last public appearance during a court case about if dogs were allowed on hotel property which he won. His health began to deteriorate in 1883, forcing him and his wife to move back to London. He died on 11 August 1884 and is buried in Kensal Green cemetery, West London.

== Authorship question ==
Edward Lloyd's business practices did not allow authors to put their names on their published work. Due to this, disagreement exists over the authorship of many works published by his company. In particular the authors of Varney the Vampire and The String of Pearls are much debated. E. F. Bleiler has argued that Rymer is most likely the author of Varney due to the differences in how he wrote dialogue compared to Thomas Peckett Prest. Louis James concurs, citing a piece of the manuscript in Rymer's handwriting.

The String of Pearls is usually attributed to either Rymer or Prest, but other contenders such as George Mcfarren or Lloyd have been suggested. The first claim of Prest being the author came in 1894 followed by a 1901 response claiming that Rymer was the true author. Although The String of Pearls was historically attributed to Prest, more recent arguments have been made that Rymer should be considered the true author. Many of these works were cooperatively written, so both usually are considered co-authors of the piece.

== Legacy ==
Rymer is held to be one of the four important writers of vampires and helping popularise them alongside Bram Stoker, Sheridan Le Fanu, and John William Polidori.

== In popular culture ==
According to legend, Rymer and Lloyd both grew so embarrassed by their previous work that they paid people to go around and take them out of stores to prevent them being seen by the public. Dick Collins speculates that this story originates from a copyright dispute where Lloyd lost the rights to some of Rymer's works and had to ask for them to be sent back as he could no longer profit from their sales.

James Malcolm Rymer features as the narrator of The Springheel Saga, Series Two: The Legend of Springheel'd Jack, by The Wireless Theatre Company. Set in 1845, Rymer is played by John Holden-White.

== Bibliography ==
- Ada the Betrayed; or, The Murder at the Old Smithy (1845)
- The String of Pearls: A Romance (1846)
- Varney the Vampyre; or the Feast of Blood (1847)
- The Widow Mortimer (1849)
- Love and Mystery; or, Married and Single: A Romance (1849)
- Mazeppa; or, The Wild Horse of the Ukraine: A Romance (1850)
- The Unspeakable; or, The Life and Adventures of a Stammerer (1855)
- The Dark Woman (1861)
- Edith the Captive; or, The Robbers of Epping Forest (1861)
- The Wronged Wife: or The Heart of Hate (1870)
- The Black Monk; or, The Secret of the Grey Turret
- The First False Step; or The Path to Crime
- The Knightriders
- Rankley Grange
- The Marquis of Dalewood
