= Sweeney Todd =

Fictional serial killer barber

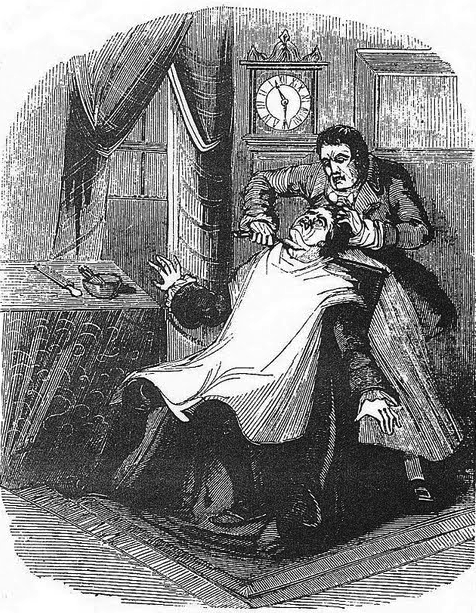
- Sweeney Todd murdering a victim, from the penny dreadful serial The String of Pearls
- First appearance: Penny dreadful serial titled The String of Pearls (1846–47)
- Created by: James Malcolm Rymer; Thomas Peckett Prest
- Portrayed by: Robert Vivian (1924 Broadway); Moore Marriott (1928 film); Tod Slaughter (1936 film); Freddie Jones (1970 television); Len Cariou (1979 Broadway, 2000 London concert); George Hearn (1980 Broadway, 2000 New York concert, 2001 San Francisco concert); Denis Quilley (1980 London cast, 1993 London revival, 1994 BBC Radio); Alun Armstrong (1993 London revival, Cottelsoe Theater cast); Ben Kingsley (1998 drama); Timothy Nolen (2004 New York City Opera); Michael Cerveris (2005 Broadway revival); Ray Winstone (2006 drama); Johnny Depp (2007 film); Michael Ball (2012 London revival); Mikhail Gorsheniov (2012 Russian musical); Jeremy Secomb (2015 London revival, 2017 Off-Broadway revival); Norm Lewis (2017 Off-Broadway revival); Hugh Panaro (2017 Off-Broadway revival); Anthony Warlow (2019 Australia); Jett Pangan (2019 Manila, 2019 Singapore); Martin Jarvis (2021 BBC Radio drama); Josh Groban (2023 Broadway); Aaron Tveit (2024 Broadway); Ramin Karimloo (2026 Birmingham Rep, revival)

In-universe information
- Full name: Benjamin Barker (Bond play and musical version)
- Gender: Male
- Title: The Demon Barber of Fleet Street
- Occupation: Barber; Serial killer
- Spouses: None in original version Lucy Barker (Bond play and musical version)
- Children: None in original version Johanna Barker (Bond play and musical version)
- Nationality: British

Sweeney Todd is a fictional character who first appeared as the villain of the penny dreadful serial The String of Pearls (1846–1847). The original tale became a feature of 19th-century melodrama and London legend. A barber from Fleet Street, Todd murders his customers with a straight razor and gives their corpses to Mrs. Lovett, his partner in crime, who bakes their flesh into meat pies. The tale has been retold many times since in various media.

Claims that Sweeney Todd was a historical person are disputed strongly by scholars, although possible legendary prototypes exist.

== Plot synopsis ==
In the original version of the tale, Todd is a barber who kills his victims by pulling a lever as they sit in his barber chair. His victims fall backward through a revolving trap door into the basement of his shop, generally breaking their necks or skulls. In case they are alive, Todd goes to the basement and "polishes them off" (slitting their throats with his straight razor). In some adaptations, the murdering process is reversed, with Todd slitting his customers' throats before dispatching them into the basement through the revolving trap door. After Todd has robbed his dead victims of their goods, Mrs. Lovett, his partner in crime (in some later versions, his friend and/or lover), assists him in disposing of the bodies by baking their flesh into meat pies and selling them to the unsuspecting customers of her pie shop. Todd's barber shop is situated at 186 Fleet Street, London, next to St. Dunstan's church, and is connected to Mrs. Lovett's pie shop in nearby Bell Yard by means of an underground passage. In most versions of the story, he and Mrs. Lovett hire an unwitting orphan boy, Tobias Ragg, to serve the pies to customers.

== Literary history ==
Sweeney Todd first appeared in a story titled The String of Pearls: A Romance. This penny dreadful was published in 18 weekly parts, in Edward Lloyd's magazine The People's Periodical and Family Library, issues 7–24, published 21 November 1846 to 20 March 1847. It was probably written by James Malcolm Rymer, though Thomas Peckett Prest has also been credited with it; possibly each worked on the serial from part to part. Other attributions include Edward P. Hingston, George Macfarren, and Albert Richard Smith. During February/March 1847, before the serial was even completed, George Dibdin Pitt adapted The String of Pearls as a melodrama for the Britannia Theatre in Hoxton, east London. It was in this alternative version of the tale, rather than the original, that Todd acquired his catchphrase: "I'll polish him off".

Lloyd published another, lengthier, penny part serial during 1847–1848, with 92 episodes. It was then published in book form in 1850 as The String of Pearls, subtitled "The Barber of Fleet Street. A Domestic Romance". This expanded version of the story was 732 pages long. A plagiarised version of this book appeared in the United States c. 1852–1853 as Sweeney Todd: or the Ruffian Barber. A Tale of Terror of the Seas and the Mysteries of the City by "Captain Merry" (a pseudonym used by American author Harry Hazel, 1814–1889).

In 1865, the French novelist Paul H.C. Féval (1816–1887), famous as a writer of horror and crime novels and short stories, referred to what he termed "L'Affaire de la Rue des Marmousets" in the introductory chapter to his book La Vampire.

In 1875, Frederick Hazleton's c. 1865 dramatic adaptation Sweeney Todd, the Barber of Fleet Street: or the String of Pearls (see below) was published as volume 102 of Lacy's Acting Edition of Plays.

A scholarly, annotated edition of the original 1846–1847 serial was published in volume form in 2007 by the Oxford University Press with the title of Sweeney Todd: The Demon Barber of Fleet Street, edited by Robert Mack.

== Alleged historical basis ==
The original story of Sweeney Todd is from an older legend that may contain motifs from even earlier stories. Possibly the oldest reference to the story in its present form is found in the journal of the Swedish traveller Pehr Lindeström. In his diary, dating from the middle of the 17th century, the story is set in Calais, which is also where the author heard the story. The story includes all the details of the legend, except for the name of the character. Another version relates to a supposed 1800 narrative of events in the rue de la Harpe, Paris, which appeared in an English version in Tell-Tale Magazine (London) under the title "A Terrific Story of the Rue de la Harpe".

In Charles Dickens' Pickwick Papers (1836–1837), the servant Sam Weller says that a pieman used cats "for beefsteak, veal, and kidney, 'cording to the demand", and recommends that people should buy pies only "when you know the lady as made it, and is quite sure it ain't kitten." Dickens then developed this in Martin Chuzzlewit (1843–1844), published two years before the appearance of Sweeney Todd in The String of Pearls (1846–1847), with a character named Tom Pinch who is grateful that his own "evil genius did not lead him into the dens of any of those preparers of cannibalic pastry, who are represented in many country legends as doing a lively retail business in the metropolis".

Claims that Sweeney Todd was a real person were first made in the introduction to the 1850 (expanded) edition of The String of Pearls and have persisted to the present. In two books, Peter Haining argued that Sweeney Todd was a historical person who committed his crimes around 1800. Nevertheless, other researchers who have tried to verify his citations do not find anything in these sources to verify Haining's claims.

== In literature ==
A late 1890s reference to the legend of the murderous barber can be found in the poem by the Australian bush poet Banjo Paterson, "The Man from Ironbark".

In Cozette de Charmoy's 1973 "collage novel", The True Life of Sweeney Todd, the character appears as a politically aware figure of social satire.

In his 2012 novel Dodger, Terry Pratchett portrays Sweeney Todd as a tragic character, having lost his mind after being exposed to the horrors of the Napoleonic Wars as a barber surgeon.

== In performing arts ==
=== In stage productions ===
- The String of Pearls (1847), a melodrama by George Dibdin Pitt that opened at Hoxton's Britannia Theatre and billed as "founded on fact". It was something of a success, and the story spread by word of mouth and acquired legendary characteristics. Various versions of the tale were staples of the British theatre for the rest of the century. The play was produced on Broadway during 1924 at the Frazee Theatre, featuring Robert Vivian as Sweeney Todd and Rafaela Ottiano as Mrs. Lovett.
- Sweeney Todd, the Barber of Fleet Street: or the String of Pearls (c. 1865), a dramatic adaptation written by Frederick Hazleton which premiered at the Old Bower Saloon, Stangate Street, Lambeth.
- Sweeney Todd (1962), a four-act melodrama adapted from The String of Pearls by Brian J Burton who also composed new songs and lyrics. It was first performed at the Crescent Theatre, Birmingham.

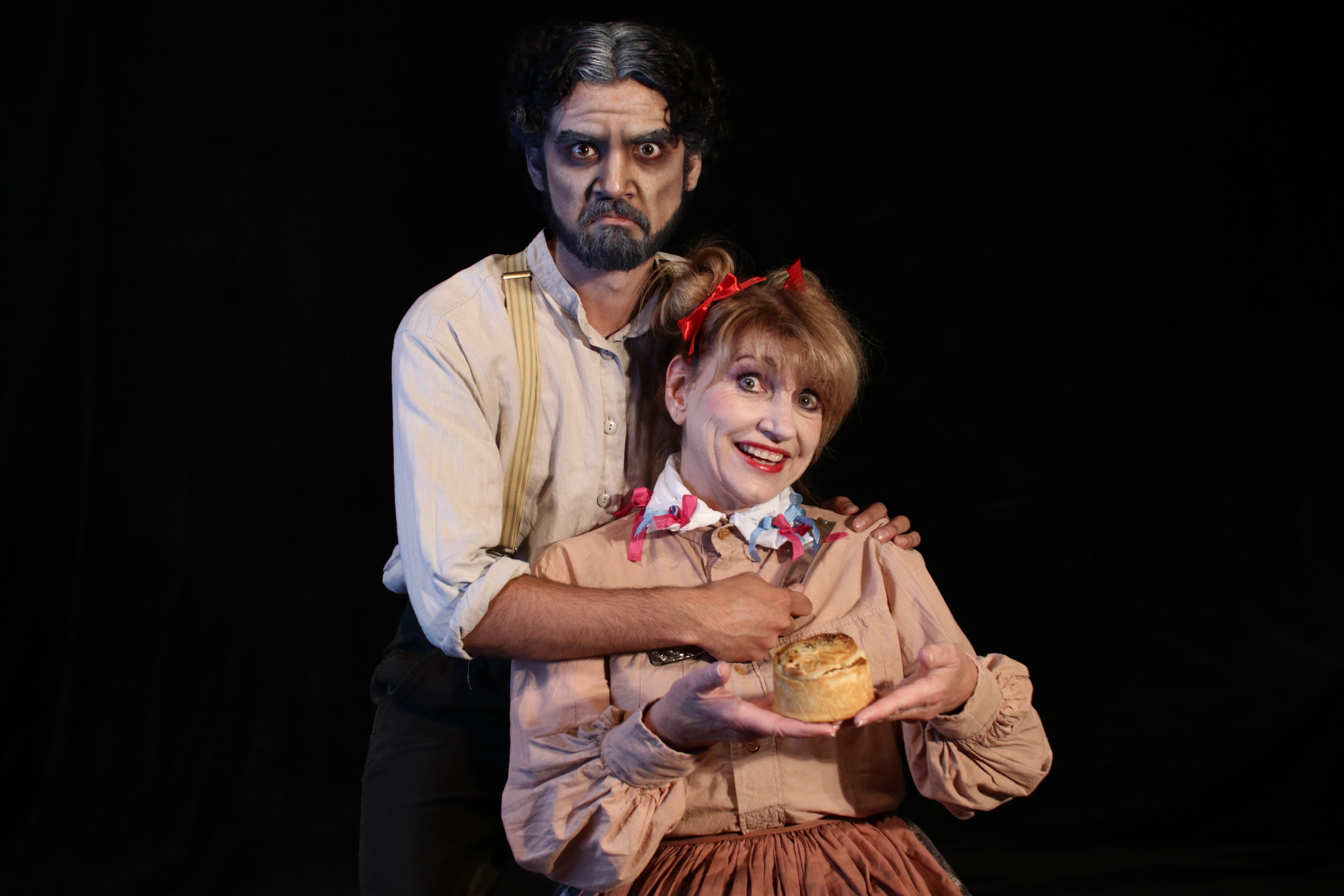
Justin Gaudoin and Phyllis Davis in Sweeney Todd: The Demon Barber of Fleet Street at the Wharf Theater, June 2018

- Sweeney Todd, The Demon Barber of Fleet Street (1973), a play by the British playwright Christopher Bond. This version of the story was the first to give Todd a slightly more sympathetic motive: he is Benjamin Barker, a barber convicted wrongfully who after 15 years in an Australian penal colony escapes and returns to London using the new name Sweeney Todd, only to find that Judge Turpin, who is responsible for his conviction, has raped his young wife Lucy and adopted Todd's daughter Johanna. He at first plans to kill Turpin, but when his prey escapes, he swears vengeance on humanity in general and begins to slash his customers' throats. He goes into business with Mrs. Lovett, his former landlady, who bakes his victims' flesh into pies. At the end of the play, he finally gets his revenge by killing Turpin, but then unknowingly kills his own wife, who Mrs. Lovett had misled him into believing had died. After learning the truth, he kills Mrs. Lovett, but is in turn killed by Mrs. Lovett's assistant and surrogate son Tobias Ragg, who slits Todd's throat with his own razor.
- Sweeney Todd: The Demon Barber of Fleet Street (1979), is a musical adaptation of Bond's play by Stephen Sondheim and Hugh Wheeler. The show began on Broadway in 1979 and in London's West End in 1980. The show won multiple awards including the Tony Award for Best Musical and the Laurence Olivier Award for Best New Musical. There have since been several revivals in the West End, on Broadway and elsewhere.
- Empanada Loca (2015), a one-woman off-Broadway production written and directed by Aaron Mark for the LAByrinth Theater Company.

=== Dance ===
- Sweeney Todd (1959), a ballet version performed by the Royal Ballet with music by Malcolm Arnold and choreography by John Cranko.

=== Movies ===
- Sweeney Todd (1926), the first movie version of the story, a 15-minute British silent movie featuring G.A. Baughan in the title role, directed by George Dewhurst. The movie is now lost.
- Sweeney Todd (1928), a British silent movie featuring Moore Marriott as Sweeney Todd and Iris Darbyshire as Amelia Lovett. This is the earliest surviving movie adaptation.
- Sweeney Todd: The Demon Barber of Fleet Street (1936), a movie version of the 19th-century melodrama featuring Tod Slaughter as Sweeney Todd and Stella Rho as Mrs. "Lovatt".
- Bloodthirsty Butchers (1970), a horror movie with John Miranda as Sweeney Todd and Jane Helay as Maggie Lovett, directed by Andy Milligan.
- Mystery and Imagination Episode: "Sweeney Todd" (1970), a TV Movie directed by Reginald Collin, adapted for television by Vincent Tilsley and Brian Brooke. Starring Freddie Jones as Sweeney Todd, Peter Sallis as Brogden, Mundel and Hopkins, Russell Hunter as Crumbles, Dr. Fogg and Dr. Makepeace, Lewis Fiander as Mark Ingestrie, Heather Canning as Nelly Lovett and Molly, Mel Martin as Charley and Charlotte, Len Jones as Tobias, Barry Stanton as Beadle and Charles Morgan as Inspector Field.
- Sweeney Todd: The Demon Barber of Fleet Street (2007), a movie directed by Tim Burton, adapted from Sondheim's musical. It features Johnny Depp as Sweeney Todd, Helena Bonham Carter as Mrs. Lovett, Alan Rickman as Judge Turpin, Jamie Campbell Bower as Anthony, and Ed Sanders as Toby. The movie received two Golden Globe Awards – one for Best Actor in a Comedy or Musical (Johnny Depp), and one for Best Picture, Comedy or Musical. The movie was also nominated for three Academy Awards, winning for Art Direction.

=== Music ===
- "Sweeney Todd, The Barber", a song which assumes its audience knows the stage version and claims that such a character existed in real life. Stanley Holloway, who recorded it in 1956, attributed it to R. P. Weston, a songwriter active from 1906 to 1934.
- "Sweeney Todd" by Brotha Lynch Hung, a song about a modern-day murderer who takes the character's name and modus operandi.
- TODD. Act 1. Feast of Blood (TODD. Акт 1. Праздник крови 2011) and TODD. Act 2. At the Edge (TODD. Акт 2. На краю 2012), two albums by Korol' i Shut, a horror punk band from Saint Petersburg.
- "Demon Sweeney Todd," a song by British heavy metal band Saxon on their 2009 studio album Into the Labyrinth.
- "Floyd The Barber," a song by grunge band Nirvana on their 1989 album Bleach, features a scenario in which Floyd Lawson, the barber from The Andy Griffith Show, becomes a murderer styled after Sweeney Todd.
- Sweeney Todd was a Canadian rock music band of the late 1970s featuring Nick Gilder, and later Bryan Adams on lead vocals.
- "Bleeders", a song from American hard rock band Black Veil Brides is about the titular character and has a music video with lead singer Andy Biersack portraying the character.

=== Radio and audio plays ===
- In 1932, Tod Slaughter recorded on Regal Zonophone Records an abridged version of the Sweeney Todd story based on his famous stage performance; this version was re-released during 2013 digitally along with a similarly abridged recorded version for Regal Zonophone of his stage performance in Maria Marten, or The Murder in the Red Barn.
- "The Strange Case of the Demon Barber" (January 8, 1946), an adaptation of the Sweeney Todd story featured in an episode of the radio drama The New Adventures of Sherlock Holmes. In this interpretation, an actor playing the character on stage begins to believe he is committing similar murders while sleepwalking, while Sherlock Holmes and Dr. Watson uncover evidence that may prove his sanity.
- In 1947, the Canadian Broadcasting Corporation's CBC Stage Series broadcast a radio adaptation by Ronald Hambleton of the George Dibdin Pitt play featuring Mavor Moore as Todd, Jane Mallett as Mrs. Lovett, John Drainie as Tobias, Lloyd Bochner as Mark Ingestrie, Bernard Braden as Jarvis Williams, Lister Sinclair as The Guide and Arden Kaye as Johanna Oakley. The production was directed by Andrew Allan, with original music composed by Lucio Agostini.
- In 1994, the 1993 National Theatre production was adapted and recorded for radio and broadcast on BBC Radio 2 with Denis Quilley as Todd and Julia McKenzie as Mrs. Lovett.
- The second episode of the BBC Radio comedy series 1835, entitled "Haircut, Sir?" (broadcast in 2004) portrayed aristocrat Viscount Belport and his servant Ned (Jason Done) joining Sir Robert Peel's police force and encountering demon barber Sweeney Todd on their first case.
- Sweeney Todd and the String of Pearls: An Audio Melodrama in Three Despicable Acts (2007), an audio play by Yuri Rasovsky, won three 2008 Audie Awards for best audio drama, best original work, and achievement in production.
- In March 2021, BBC Radio 4 broadcast Sweeney Todd and the String of Pearls, a two-part adaptation by Archie Scottney of the Prest novel/serial, directed by Rosalind Ayres and with Martin Jarvis as Sweeney Todd, Joanne Whalley as Mrs. Lovett, Rufus Sewell as Colonel Jeffries, Moira Quirk as Joanna and Ian Ogilvy as Major Bounce.

=== Television ===
- "Sweeney Todd" (1970), an episode of the ITV series Mystery and Imagination featuring Freddie Jones as Sweeney Todd and Heather Canning as Nellie Lovett. In this adaptation, written by Vincent Tilsey and directed by Reginald Collin, the title character is portrayed as insane rather than evil. Lewis Fiander played Mark Ingesterie with Mel Martin as the heroine Charlotte and Len Jones as Tobias.
- Sweeney Todd (1973), an hour-long TV production by the CBC Television series The Purple Playhouse with Barry Morse as Todd. This was again Pitt's version of the play.
- Teeny Todd: The Demon Barber of Queer Street was a musical comedy skit performed on The Two Ronnies with Ronnie Corbett as the pint-sized half-brother of Sweeney Todd and Ronnie Barker as Mrs. Lovett. They revive the arrangement that Lovett had with Todd, and nearly get away with it until some clumsiness on Teeny's part reveals to a room full of police the chute down to the kitchen.
- The Tale of Sweeney Todd (1998), directed by John Schlesinger, a made-for-television version first broadcast by the Showtime network, featuring Ben Kingsley as Sweeney Todd, Joanna Lumley as Mrs. Lovett, and Campbell Scott as Ben Carlyle, a police inspector; commissioned by British Sky Broadcasting for which Ben Kingsley received a Screen Actors Guild Best Actor nomination for his portrayal of the title role.
- Sweeney Todd: The Demon Barber of Fleet Street in Concert (2001), a filmed concert version of Sondheim's musical, featuring George Hearn as Sweeney Todd/Benjamin Barker, Patti LuPone as Mrs. Lovett, Timothy Nolen as Judge Turpin, and Neil Patrick Harris as Tobias. A new version of this production was broadcast in September 2014, this time with Bryn Terfel as Todd, Emma Thompson as Mrs. Lovett, and Philip Quast as Judge Turpin.
- Sweeney Todd (2006), a BBC television drama version with a screenplay written by Joshua St Johnston and featuring Ray Winstone in the title role and Essie Davis as Mrs. Lovett. In this version, set in the 18th rather than 19th century, Todd's murderous ways are the result of physical (possibly sexual) cruelty and assault while imprisoned as a child in Newgate Gaol for a crime committed by his father who had escaped; at the movie's conclusion, while in a cell in Newgate and shaving himself on the morning of his execution, he deliberately slashes his own throat rather than be hanged.
- "Oh My, Meat Pie" (2008), an episode of the Cooking Channel series Good Eats, which inserts the inventor of shepherd's pie into the world of Sweeney Todd in a historical recounting of the original recipe of the dish.
- "Andy's Play" (2010), the 129th episode of The Office series, with Andy Bernard (Ed Helms) singing and acting in a production of Stephen Sondheim and Hugh Wheeler's Sweeney Todd. It was broadcast originally by NBC on October 7, 2010.
- "The Horror of Dolores Roach" (2023), a television adaptation of the 2015 one-woman off-Broadway production "Empanada Loca." The off-Broadway show and the television adaptation are both inspired by the legend of Sweeney Todd, focusing on the titular character of Dolores going down a similar path.

=== In comics ===
- The character of Sweeney Todd is presented as a villain in Marc Andreyko's Manhunter series, wherein he appears as a ghost which possesses men (causing them to resemble him) and murders women. A supporting character, Obsidian, is shown to be a fan of Sondheim's musical.
- Neil Gaiman and Michael Zulli were to have created a Sweeney Todd adaptation for Taboo, published by Steve Bissette and Tundra, but only completed a prologue.
- Classical Comics, a UK publisher creating graphic novel adaptations of classical literature, has produced a full colour, 176-page paperback, Sweeney Todd: The Demon Barber of Fleet Street (2010), with script adaptation by Sean M. Wilson, linework by Declan Shalvey; colouring by Jason Cardy & Kat Nicholson, and lettering by Jim Campbell.

=== In rhyming slang ===
In rhyming slang, Sweeney Todd is the Flying Squad (a branch of the UK's Metropolitan Police), which inspired the television series The Sweeney.
