= Christopher Bond =

British playwright

- Born: 1945 (age 79–80); Sussex, England, United Kingdom
- Occupations: Actor, playwright, theatre director
- Organizations: Everyman Theatre, Liverpool, Liverpool Playhouse, Half Moon Theatre
- Notable work: Sweeney Todd (1970)

Christopher Godfrey Bond (born 1945) is a British actor, playwright and theatre director whose 1970 retelling of the Victorian tale Sweeney Todd formed the basis of Stephen Sondheim's musical of the same name, with book by Hugh Wheeler. He wrote this while he was resident dramatist at Victoria Theatre, Stoke-on-Trent (1970–71). He was artistic director of the Everyman Theatre, Liverpool (1976–78), director of Liverpool Playhouse (1981–83), and artistic director of Half Moon Theatre (1984–89). He lives in West Cornwall.

== Plays ==
- Mountain Fire
- Mutiny (1970)
- Sweeney Todd, the Demon Barber of Fleet Street (1970)
- Simple Simon (1971)
- Not So Simple Simon (1971)
- Shem's Boat (1971)
- Downright Hooligan (1972)
- Judge Jeffreys (1973)
- Tarzan's Last Stand (1973)
- The Country Wife (1974)
- Under New Management (1975)
- The Cantril Tales (1975)
- The Adventures of Finn McCool (1976)
- George (1976)
- Good Soldier Scouse (1976)
- Scum: Death, Destruction, and Dirty Washing (1976)
- The Beggars Opera (1977)
- A Tale of Two Cities (1981)
- Gone To Jesus (1982)
- Dracula (1984)
- Spend, Spend, Spend (1985)
- All the Fun of the Fair (1986)
- El Sid (1988)
- Mysterie of Maria Marten (1991)
- Roll With the Punches (1996)
- The Blood of Dracula (1997)
- Alice on the Underground (2004)
- Hubble Bubble (2004)
- Don Quixote Rides Again (2005)
- It's A Fine Life! (2006)
- Romford Rose (with Jo Collins, 2016)
