= Edward Lloyd (publisher) =

British publisher (1815-1890)

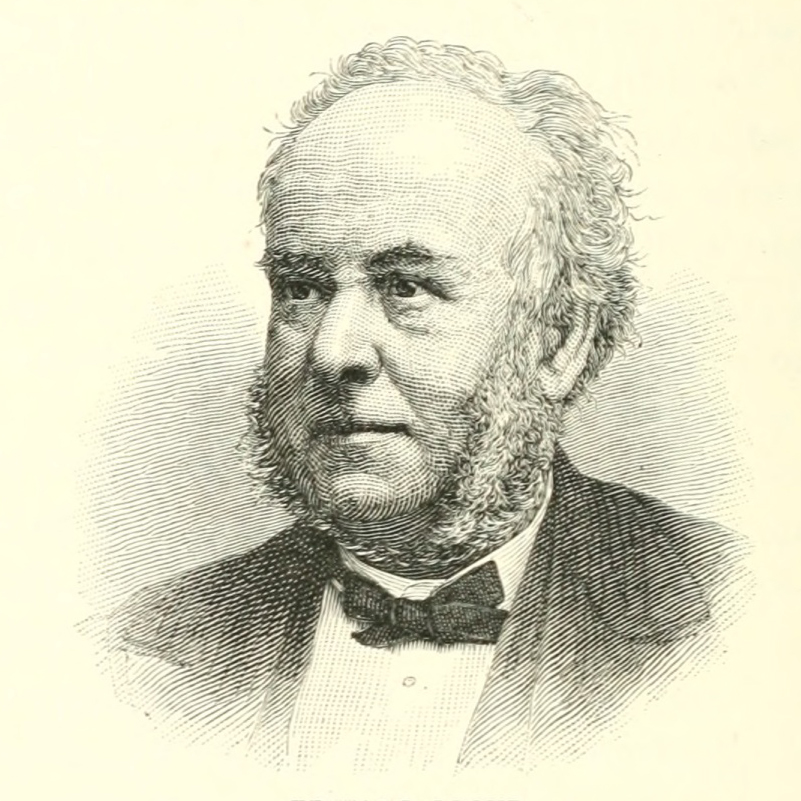
Portrait of Edward Lloyd, published in Journalistic London, 1882

Edward Lloyd (16 February 1815 – 8 April 1890) was a British London-based publisher. He published serialised fiction such as Sweeney Todd, Varney the Vampire, and many penny dreadful serials. He also published newspapers, including Lloyd’s Weekly, the first newspaper to reach a million circulation, and the Daily Chronicle, which was later bought out in 1918 by Prime Minister David Lloyd George.

Lloyd incorporated innovative industrial processes into his publishing, such as Richard March Hoe’s rotary press. He was the first newspaper publisher in the 19th century to practice vertical integration, including harvesting esparto grass in Algeria to make paper.

Lloyd has been described as a key figure in the emergence of newspapers and popular culture in Britain.

== Early publishing ==
Edward Lloyd was the third son of a family impoverished by the father's intermittent bankruptcy. He was born in Thornton Heath and spent his life in London. For a time, he worked at a law firm. At age 14, he dropped out of school to study printing at the London Mechanics' Institute.

Due to the rise of literacy during the Industrial Revolution, there was a greater demand for affordable reading materials to be read by the working class. Initially, Lloyd began selling cheap items such as cards and songs. In 1832, he started his first periodical, The Weekly Penny Comic Magazine. This magazine featured the art of the cartoonist C.J. Grant, in a series called Lloyd’s Political Jokes. He set up presses of his own from 1835 in rented shop premises.

In 1834, Lloyd got married and had his first child. In order to continue supporting himself, he wrote and printed a shorthand printing technical manual, which was sold for six pennies. He also began publishing serialised fiction. This fiction was published both standalone and in periodicals.

During this time, Lloyd ran periodicals under such names as People’s Periodical and Family Library, Lloyd’s Entertaining Journal and Lloyd’s Penny Weekly Miscellany of Romance and General Interest. Topics in his publishing also included gardening and household management. Lloyd's periodicals sometimes mixed technical information and manuals. Periodicals could also include images, such as woodcuts by artists.

From the mid-1830s until the early 1850s, Lloyd out published his competition. For example, he published approximately 200 romance stories, compared to George Pierce, who published fewer than 50.

Authors most commonly associated with Lloyd were James Malcolm Rymer and Thomas Peckett Prest.

Lloyd also published plagiarised versions of Charles Dickens stories, with works such as The Penny Pickwick, Oliver Twiss and Nickelas Nicklebery. An issue of his Pickwick reputedly sold 50,000 copies, which outsold Dickens's originals. The reason for this was that the originals costed 12 times as much as Lloyd's imitation. The plagiarised versions were also sold through tobacconists and small shops rather than booksellers.

Due to these plagiarised versions, Lloyd was sued by Chapman & Hall, Dickens's publishers, for plagiarism of The Pickwick Papers in 1837. However, the lawsuit failed. The judge ruled that the publishers had not made out a viable case, without calling on Dickens to testify. Following this, Dickens campaigned for plagiarism reform, which led to the Copyright Act 1842.

Lloyd nearly went bankrupt in 1838. During the 1840s, Lloyd continued expanding the range of serialized fiction he offered. Due to the instability of the UK economy at the time, Lloyd still struggled.

== Newspaper publishing ==
From early in his career, Lloyd wished to publish a newspaper. However, stamp duty made it too expensive. In order to circumvent this, while publishing fiction, he would craft stories which echoed current news.

In 1942, Lloyd created Lloyd's Weekly Newspaper. Early on, Lloyd was continuously fined for failing to pay stamp duties.

Due to Lloyd editing the newspaper himself, he controlled the political content of the newspaper.

Douglas Jerrold was one of the main writers for the newspaper early on. After he died in 1857, he son took over in the role until his own death in 1885, at which point Thomas Catling took over.

Circulation of Lloyd’s Weekly reached 32,000 in its first year, but it was slow to grow. After Jerrold's appointment in 1852, the circulation began to grow. In 1855, the stamp duty on newspapers was abolished, which led to the price for the newspaper going down. Following the abolishment on paper duty in 1861, the price of the newspaper fell again. Following this, there was a significant growth in circulation took off. By 1865, it was selling more than 400,000 copies. As a result, Lloyd and Hoe continued to work together for the rest of their lives.

In the 1850s, Lloyd used Richard March Hoe’s rotary press to print newspapers more easily. While Hoe had initially been unwilling to sell Lloyd one of his presses, as they were still limited in number, Hoe would go on to produce a large number of rotary presses in the United Kingdom due to the success of Lloyd's Weekly.

Also in the 1850s, supply problems prompted Lloyd to set up paper-making capacity of his own. The standards of the time, which included cotton rags, cotton waste and straw, weren't good enough. Lloyd chose esparto grass, initially from Spain, which he chose to grow in Algeria. In Oran and Arzew, he installed hydraulic machinery that compacted the grass into tight bales for transportation. In 1863, Lloyd also bought a paper mill in Sittingbourne, in order to fully produce his paper on his own.

In 1872, Lloyd created the Daily Chronicle, a daily newspaper. The editor was Robert Whelan Boyle, a literary Irish journalist.

In 1889, Lloyd attempted an overhaul of the format of Lloyd's Weekly. While doing so, he fell ill for several months. Once he recovered, he continued to work on the layout overhaul. However, it was still incomplete when he died in 1890.

Lloyd cherished this newspaper as his first-born. In 1889 he undertook a major overhaul – the format had not changed much in 45 years. This was so taxing that he fell ill that summer, probably from a heart attack. After recovering, he returned to the task and it was all but finished when he died on 8 April 1890.

== Personal life ==
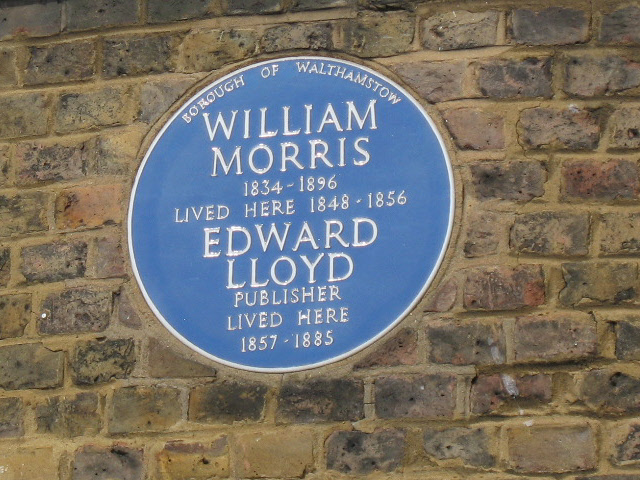
Blue Plaque to William Morris and Edward Lloyd on the William Morris Gallery in Walthamstow. “Water House” was the Lloyd family home from 1856. Edward Lloyd's heirs gave part of the 100-acre estate to the people of Walthamstow in 1898 and it was opened as Lloyd Park in 1900.

Lloyd's family background was middle class. Edward's eldest brother Thomas (1809–1876) became a doctor and Fellow of the Royal College of Surgeons. Their third brother, William, died from alcoholism.

Lloyd married Isabella McArthur in 1834. They had three children together. Edward Jr was born in 1834 and Charles was born in 1840. They both lived into old age. A third son, Alfred, was born in 1842, but lived only 17 months.

In April 1844, it was discovered that Lloyd had been having an affair with Mary Harvey, the wife of Lloyd's paper supplier, William Mullett. Mullett sued Lloyd over this. Also following this, McArthur separated from Lloyd.

Mary and Lloyd had a child, Frederick, born in February 1845. Mary died of cholera in August 1849 and Frederick was brought up by his father.

Following Mary's death, Lloyd then formed the relationship with Maria Martins that was to last for the rest of his life. While the time of their meeting isn't known, they were present in the same house at the time of the 1851 census. As Isabella was still alive, they could not marry. Following her death in 1867, they married. Together, Lloyd would have 15 children with Maria.

All Edward's children were well educated, mostly at small boarding schools. Frank was partly educated in France. Others of his sons were probably educated abroad for at least part of their schooling.

The only child who went to university was his youngest son, Percy, who studied at Oxford and became a clergyman. Percy's lasting memorial is Voewood House in Norfolk. He commissioned the architect Edward S Prior to build it in 1902.

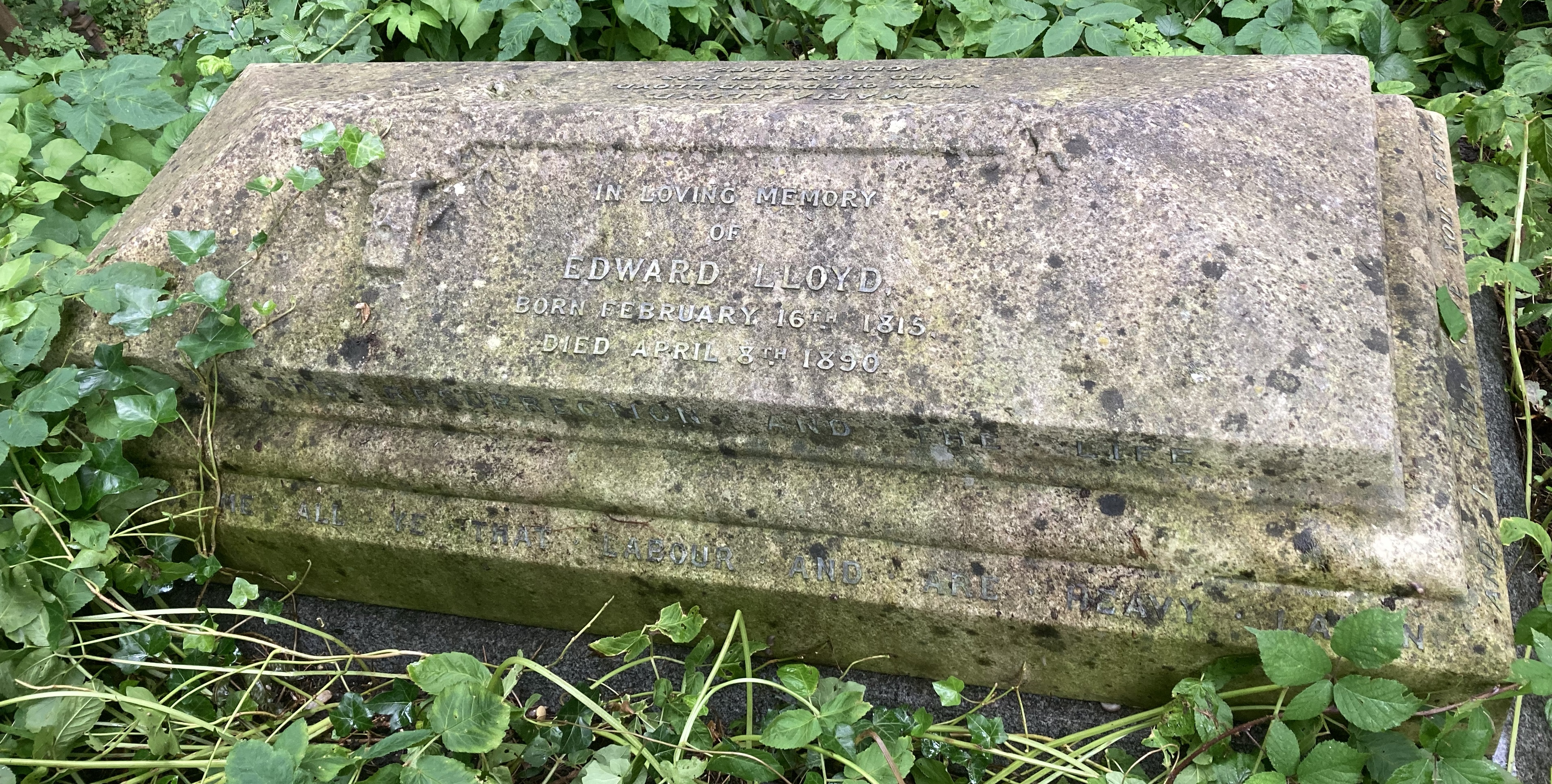
Grave of Edward Lloyd in Highgate Cemetery

He is buried on the western side of Highgate Cemetery.
