= Varney the Vampire =

1847 novel by James Malcom Rymer

Varney the Vampire; or, the Feast of Blood
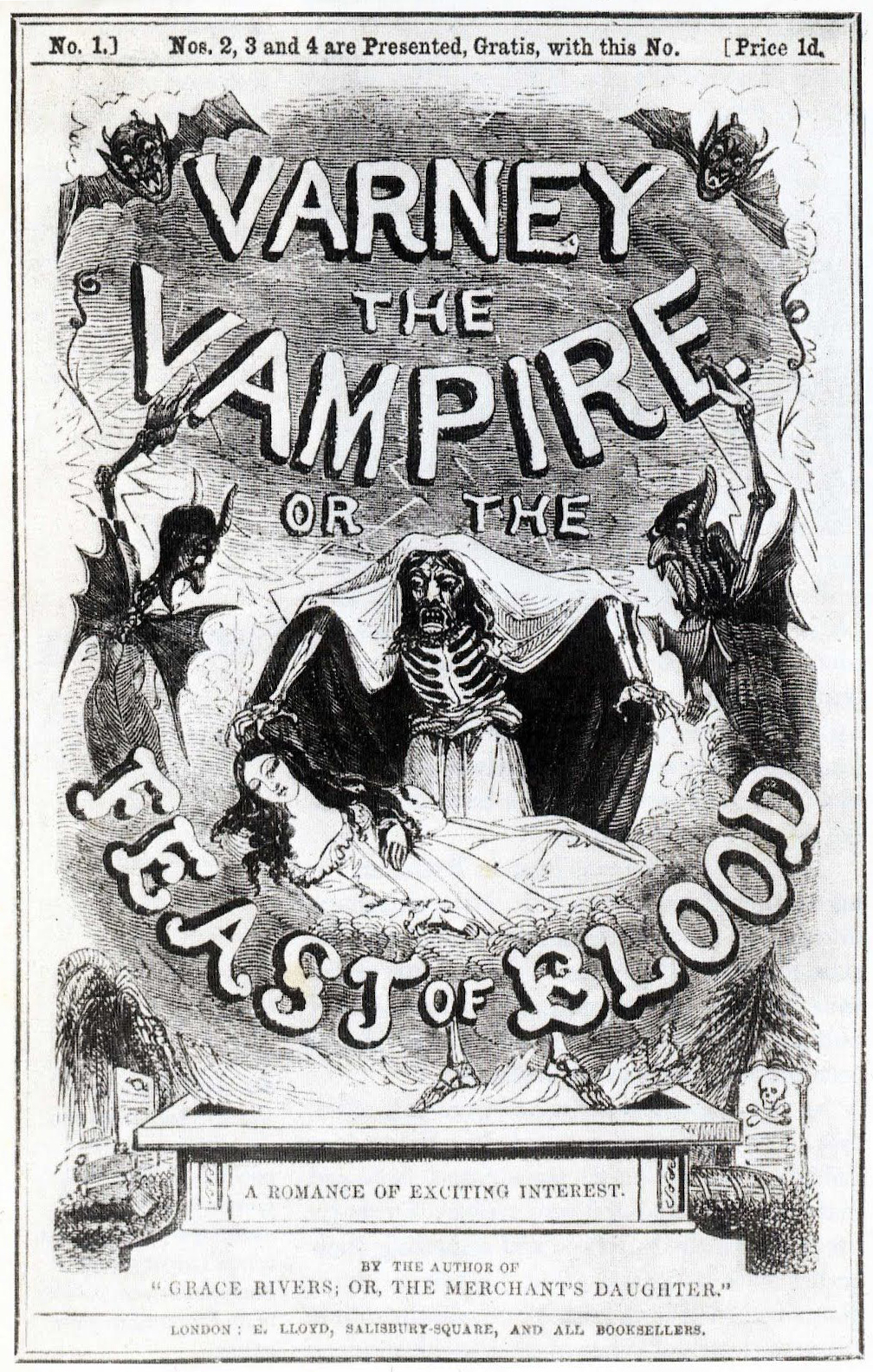
- Cover from one of the original publications.
- Author: James Malcolm Rymer; Thomas Peckett Prest
- Language: English
- Genre: Penny dreadful/Gothic horror
- Publication date: 1845–1847 (serial); 1847 (book)
- Publication place: United Kingdom
- Media type: Print
- Pages: 876 (book)

Varney the Vampire; or, the Feast of Blood is a Victorian-era serialized gothic horror story variously attributed to James Malcolm Rymer and Thomas Peckett Prest. It first appeared in 1845–1847 as a series of weekly cheap pamphlets of the kind then known as "penny dreadfuls". The author was paid by the typeset line, so when the story was published in book form in 1847, it was of massive length: the original edition ran to 876 double-columned pages and 232 chapters. Altogether it totals nearly 667,000 words.

It is the tale of the vampire Sir Francis Varney, and introduced many of the tropes present in vampire fiction recognizable to modern audiences. It was the first story to refer to sharpened teeth for a vampire, noting: "With a plunge he seizes her neck in his fang-like teeth".

== Story ==
=== Setting ===
The story has a confused setting. While ostensibly set in the early eighteenth century, there are references to the Napoleonic Wars and other indicators that the story is contemporary to the time of its writing in the mid-nineteenth century. Varney's adventures also occur in various locations including London, Bath, Winchester and Naples.

=== Human characters ===
The plot concerns the troubles that Sir Francis Varney inflicts upon the Bannerworths, a formerly wealthy family driven to ruin by their recently deceased father. Initially the Bannerworths consist of Mrs Bannerworth and her adult children Henry, George, and Flora (George is never mentioned by name after the thirty-sixth chapter). A family friend, Mr Marchdale, lives with the Bannerworths in early chapters. Later, Flora's fiancé Charles Holland, his seafaring uncle Admiral Bell, and Bell's jovial assistant Jack Pringle also take residence with the Bannerworths.

=== Varney ===
Though the earliest chapters give the standard motives of blood sustenance for Varney's actions toward the family, later ones suggest that Varney is motivated by monetary interests. The story is at times inconsistent and confusing, as if the author were indecisive about making Varney a literal vampire or simply a human who acts like one. Varney bears a strong resemblance to a portrait in Bannerworth Hall, and the implication throughout is that he is actually Marmaduke Bannerworth (or Sir Runnagate Bannerworth; the names are confused throughout the story), but that connection is never clarified. He is portrayed as loathing his condition, and at one point he turns Clara Crofton, a member of another family he terrorizes, into a vampire for revenge.

Over the course of the book, Varney is presented with increasing sympathy as a victim of circumstances. He tries to save himself, but is unable to do so. He ultimately commits suicide by throwing himself into Mount Vesuvius, after having left a written account of his origin with a sympathetic priest. According to Varney, he was cursed with vampirism after he betrayed a royalist to Oliver Cromwell, and subsequently killed his own son accidentally in a fit of anger. He "dies" and is revived several times in the course of his career. This afforded the author a variety of origin stories. In one of these, a medical student named Dr. Chillingworth applies galvanism to Varney's hanged corpse and revives him. This sub-plot parallels the earlier story of Frankenstein by Mary Shelley and film adaptations which introduce electricity as Dr. Frankenstein's means of creating the monster.

== Legacy ==
Scholars including A. Asbjørn Jøn have suggested that Varney was a major influence on later vampire fiction, including Dracula (1897) by Bram Stoker. Many of today's standard vampire tropes originated in Varney: Varney has fangs, leaves two puncture wounds on the necks of his victims, comes through a window to attack a sleeping maiden, has hypnotic powers, and has superhuman strength. Unlike later fictional vampires, he is able to go about in daylight and has no particular fear of either crosses or garlic. He can eat and drink in human fashion as a form of disguise, but he points out that human food and drink do not agree with him. This is also the first example of the "sympathetic vampire", a vampire who despises his condition but is nonetheless a slave to it.

== In popular culture ==
In the Marvel Universe, "Varnae" is the name of the first vampire, created by the people of Atlantis before it sank.

In the thirteenth episode of the 1991 television series Dracula: The Series, Varney treated Dracula (going by Alexander Lucard in the series) for blood poisoning. He was played by Sam Malkin.

In the sixth episode of the TV series Penny Dreadful (2014), Abraham Van Helsing gives a copy of Varney the Vampire to Victor Frankenstein, explaining that the story is more truth than fiction and that the mysterious creature the series' characters are pursuing is a vampire.

Varney is one of the main characters in Strange Practice (2017) and its sequels by Vivian Shaw.

The 2017 film The Man Who Invented Christmas shows Charles Dickens reading it at the time that he was developing the supernatural elements of his novella A Christmas Carol; however, Varney was not published until 1845, and the film's action is set in 1843.

In 2020, the fifth season episode 'The Stakeout' of BBC anthology series Inside No. 9 features PC Varney, named after the character and played by Reece Shearsmith.

In 2021, Varney appears as a character in Castlevania season 4, as an alter ego of Death (voiced by Malcolm McDowell), used to operate beneath notice to advance his goals.

== Authorship ==
The story was published by Edward Lloyd, whose policy was not to allow authors to put their name on their published work. Due to this there is disagreement over the authorship of many works published by his company. Varney the Vampire is generally considered to have been co-written by James Malcolm Rymer and Thomas Preskett Prest. However, E. F. Bleiler has argued that Rymer is most likely the author due to the differences in how he wrote dialogue compared to Prest. Louis James also considered Rymer the most likely author, citing a piece of the manuscript in his handwriting.

== Subsequent appearances ==
The story was an immediate success and several other authors quickly adapted the character of Sir Francis Varney into other works.

A vampire character called Sir Francis Varney appears in the anime and manga series The Case Study of Vanitas (2015–).
