= Bartholomew Fair =

Fair in London

Coordinates: 51°31.1′N 0°6′W

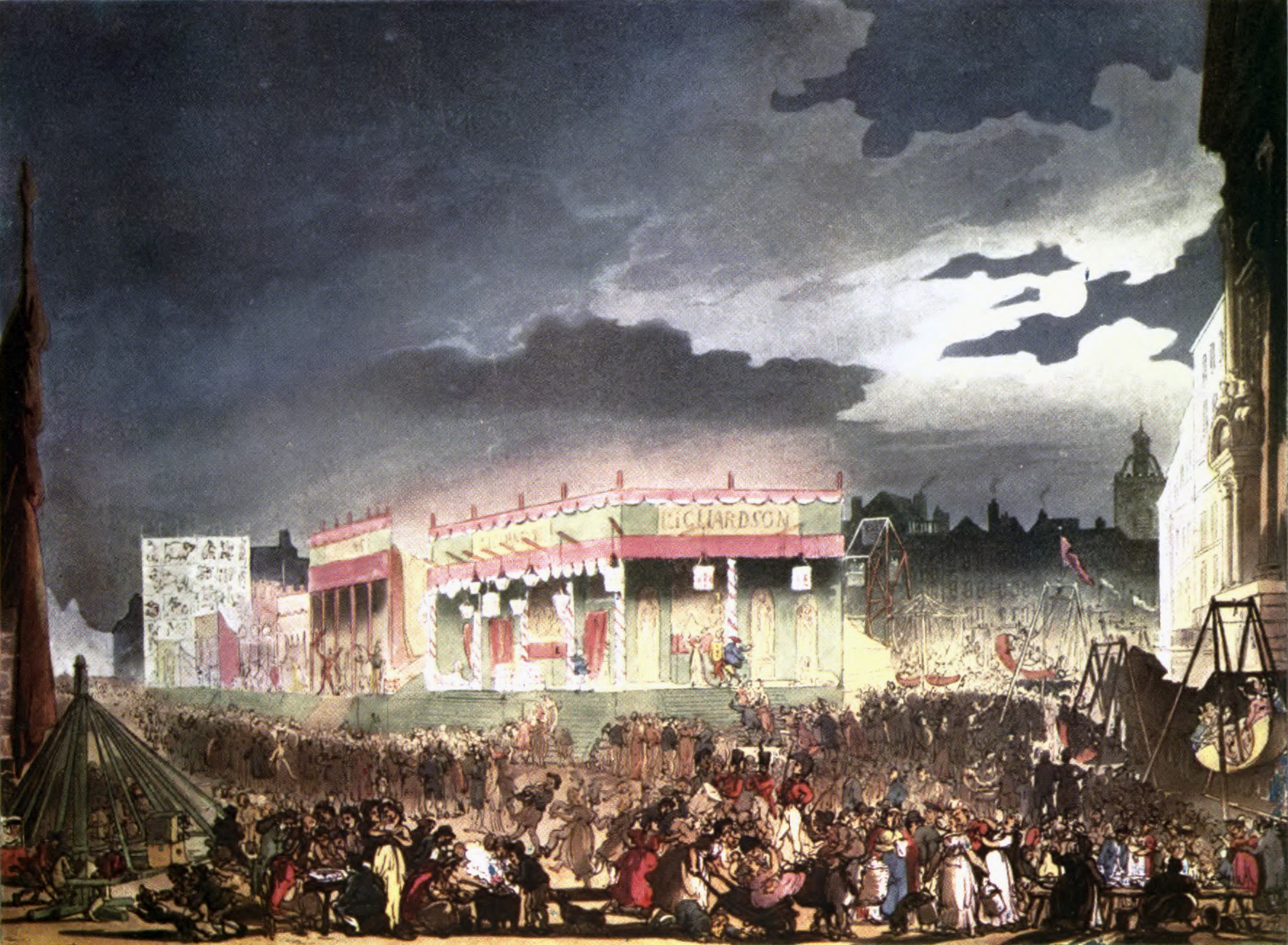
Bartholomew Fair as illustrated in 1808

The Bartholomew Fair was one of London's pre-eminent summer charter fairs. A charter for the fair was granted by King Henry I to fund the Priory of St Bartholomew in 1133. It took place each year on 24 August (St Bartholomew's Day) within the precincts of the Priory at West Smithfield, London until 1855 when it was banned due to the unruly crowd and what was seen as inappropriate entertainment for Victorian London.

== Description ==
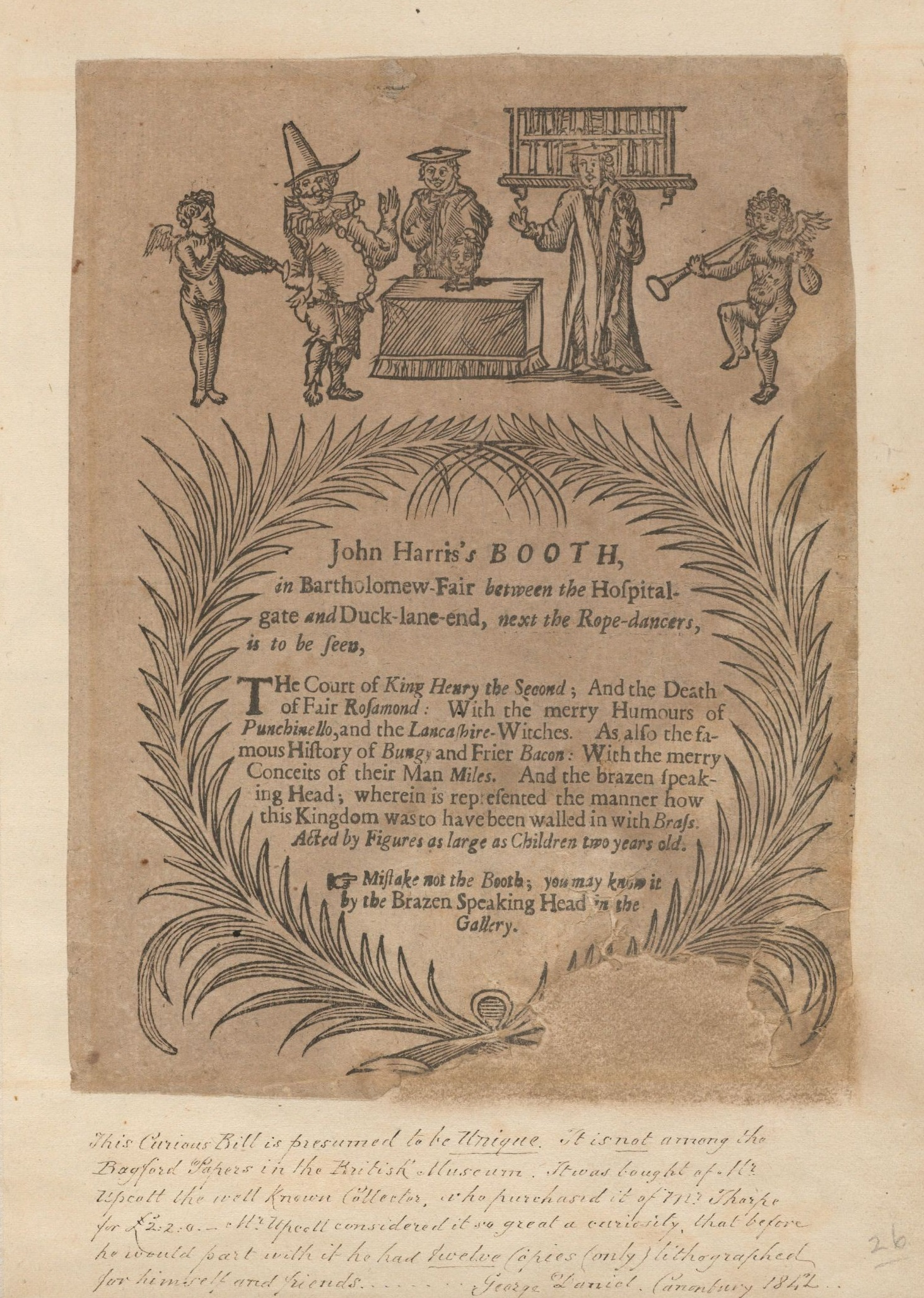
Advertisement for a puppetry booth at Bartholomew Fair, circa 1700

Granted by charter from King Henry I to Rahere to fund the Priory of St Bartholomew in 1133, the fair became London's most important fair, it took place each year on 24 August within the precincts of the Priory at West Smithfield, outside Aldersgate of the City of London. The site of Bartholomew Fair was the south-east side of Smithfield roundabout and was originally a cloth fair. Originally chartered as a three-day event, it would last a full two weeks in the 17th century; but in 1691, it was shortened to only four days. With a change in the calendar, the fair commenced on 3 September from 1753. A trading event for cloth and other goods as well as a pleasure fair, the event drew crowds from all classes of English society.

It was customary for the Lord Mayor of London to open the fair on St Bartholomew's Eve. The Mayor would stop at Newgate Prison to accept a cup of sack (fortified white wine) from the governor. The Merchant Taylors Guild processed to Cloth Fair to test the measures for cloth, using their standard silver yard, until 1854. The annual fair grew to become the chief cloth sale in the kingdom.

By 1641, the fair had achieved international importance. It had outgrown the former location along Cloth Fair, and around the Priory graveyard to now cover four parishes: Christ Church, Great and Little St Bartholomew’s and St Sepulchre’s. The fair featured sideshows, prize-fighters, musicians, wire-walkers, acrobats, puppets, freaks and wild animals.

The fair was suppressed in 1855 by the City authorities for encouraging debauchery and public disorder. The Newgate Calendar had denounced the fair as a "school of vice which has initiated more youth into the habits of villainy than Newgate itself."

== In literature and art ==
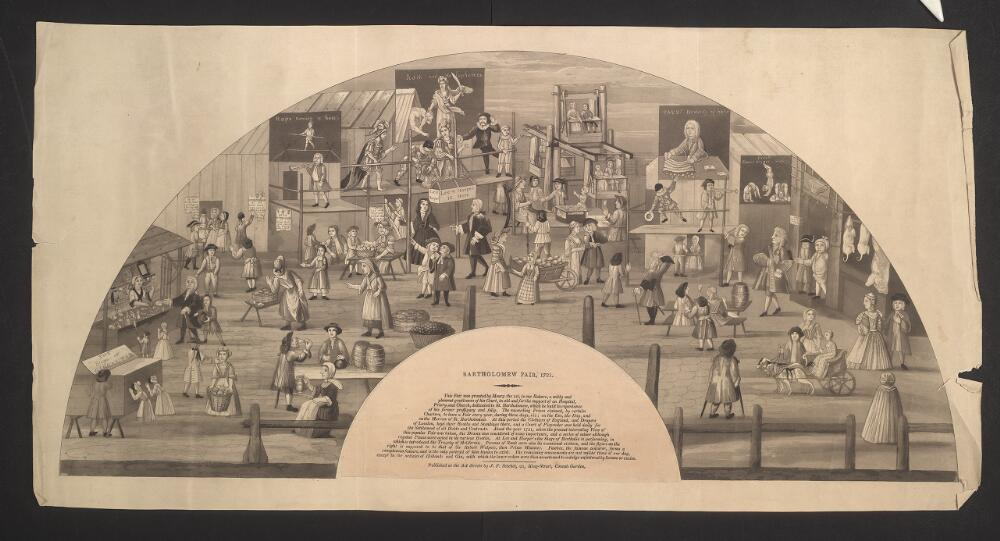
Print of the Bartholomew Fair meant to be shaped into a hand fan, 1721.

The Bartholomew Fair is the setting for Bartholomew Fair, a play by Ben Jonson. Samuel Pepys wrote about the fair in his diary. John Evelyn also refers in his diary to having visited "the celebrated follies of Bartholomew Fair" on 16 August 1648 . In Daniel Defoe's Moll Flanders (1722) the heroine meets a well-dressed gentleman at the fair. In Wordsworth's The Prelude (1805) mention is made of the din and the Indians and dwarfs at the fair. The Bartholomew Fair of 1845 features as the primary location of The Wireless Theatre Company's "The Carnival Of Horrors", the second episode of "The Springheel Saga, Series Two: The Legend of Springheel'd Jack".

== See also ==
- Charter
- Charter fair
- History of marketing
- Market (place)
- Retail
