= Isaac Asimov's Wonderful Worlds of Science Fiction =

The first volume, Intergalactic Empires, 1983, cover art by Paul Alexander.

Isaac Asimov's Wonderful Worlds of Science Fiction is a series of ten themed paperback science fiction anthologies edited by Isaac Asimov, Martin H. Greenberg and Charles G. Waugh, a companion set to the twelve volume Isaac Asimov's Magical Worlds of Fantasy, produced by the same editors. It was published by Signet/New American Library from 1983 to 1990.

Each volume in the series featured stories devoted to a different science fictional theme, as indicated in the individual volume titles. Most volumes also included an introduction by Asimov.

== The series ==
1. Intergalactic Empires (1983)
2. The Science Fictional Olympics (1984)
3. Supermen (1984)
4. Comets (1986)
5. Tin Stars (1986)
6. Neanderthals (1987)
7. Space Shuttles (1987)
8. Monsters (1988)
9. Robots (1989)
10. Invasions (1990)

== See also ==
- Isaac Asimov's Magical Worlds of Fantasy
