= The Freak Show =

1970 anthology of short works edited by Peter Haining

- Cover of first edition
- Author: edited by Peter Haining
- Language: English
- Genre: Fantasy, horror
- Publisher: Rapp & Whiting
- Publication date: 1970
- Publication place: United Kingdom
- Media type: Print (hardcover)
- Pages: 256 pp.
- ISBN: 0-85391-146-0

The Freak Show is an anthology of fantasy and horror short works edited by Peter Haining. It was first published in hardcover by Rapp & Whiting in March 1970. The first paperback edition was issued by Corgi in March 1971, and a second hardcover edition by Thomas Nelson in 1972. It has also been translated into German.

The book collects twenty novelettes and short stories by various authors, together with an introduction by the editor.

== Contents ==
- "Introduction: The Truth About the Bearded Lady" (Peter Haining)
- "The Magician" (Daniel Defoe)
- "Hop-Frog" (Edgar Allan Poe)
- "Spurs" (Tod Robbins)
- "The Ampoi Giant" (Clark Ashton Smith)
- "The Dwarf" (Ray Bradbury)
- "The Gnarly Man" (L. Sprague de Camp)
- "The Gay Deceiver" (Mildred Clingerman)
- "The Rabbit Prince" (Davis Grubb)
- "Beidenbauer's Flea" (Stanley Ellin)
- "The Power of the Puppets" (Fritz Leiber)
- "The Rising Man" (Joseph Payne Brennan)
- "Jizzle" (John Wyndham)
- "Carousel" (August Derleth)
- "Heads You Win ..." (Esther Carlson)
- "Girl from Mars" (Robert Bloch)
- "At Last, the True Story of Frankenstein" (Harry Harrison)
- "Mutants for Sale" (Eric Frank Russell)
- "Horrer Howce" (Margaret St. Clair)
- "Big Sam Was My Friend" (Harlan Ellison)
- "After the Fair" (Dylan Thomas)
