= The Springheel Saga =

Drama audio series by Jack Bowman and Robert Valentine

Wireless Theatre Company audio drama
- Series: 3
- Written by: Jack Bowman; Robert Valentine
- Directed by: Robert Valentine
- Produced by: Jack Bowman; Mariele Runacre Temple; Robert Valentine
- Music: Francesco Quadraruopolo
- Length: 9 episodes (30–40 minutes each)
- Release date: 2011–2016

The Springheel Saga is a drama audio series about the Victorian bogeyman, Spring-heeled Jack, written by Jack Bowman and Robert Valentine, and produced by The Wireless Theatre Company. The first series, The Strange Case of Springheel'd Jack, released in 2011 and starring Julian Glover, is based on the original 1837–38 Spring-heeled Jack sightings. Nicholas Parsons features in the second series, The Legend of Springheel'd Jack, which was released in 2013 and focuses on Spring-heeled Jack's absorption into popular culture in the 1840s. The third and final series, The Secret of Springheel'd Jack, released over 2015 and 2016, features Jenny Runacre and Matthew Kelly, and deals with the 1877 Aldershot barracks incident. The production was Wireless Theatre's first audio series, and is distributed as a digital download in MP3 format.

== Plot ==
=== Series One: The Strange Case of Springheel'd Jack ===
==== Episode 1: The Ghost of Clapham Common ====
London, 1837. Metropolitan Police Constable Jonah Smith and his chirpy sidekick, Toby Hooks, are called to Clapham churchyard to investigate an attack on a young woman, Polly Adams, who insists her assailant was the devil. Although other attacks have been reported – and despite seeing a similar figure as a child on the night his parents died – Smith remains skeptical. However, Hooks then shows Smith something he's kept from public view: a large, strangely-shaped footprint at the base of the high church wall.

Meanwhile, at Dover, vicious cockney killers Chough and D'Urberville are performing their own parallel investigation into the whereabouts of Charlotte Fitzrandolph, who is returning to England from Europe, and has with her a family heirloom, the Burning Truth: a pendant with seemingly supernatural properties. The two assassins torture a shipping clerk to find out where she's headed, and duly head for London.

Smith's inquiries soon bring him to the attention of Lord Wayland, a powerful Tory landowner, who is keen for Springheel Jack to be caught before his reign of terror gets out of hand. Now single-handedly responsible for catching the fiend, Smith and Hooks investigate Clapham Common, the apparent epicentre of the attacks. Chough and D'Urberville also head for the common following a tip-off, and mistakenly apprehend another young woman, Mary Stevens. Responding to Mary's screams, Smith races to her rescue. While Smith faces off against the two villains, Mary escapes and runs straight into the monstrous Springheel Jack. Meanwhile, Smith quickly succumbs to D'Urberville's deadly garrotte...

==== Episode 2: The Crypt of Evil ====
Having survived the attack on the common, Smith and Hooks make a connection between the recent sightings and the nearby Morgan Arms pub. Meanwhile, at a lavish masquerade ball, Lord Wayland entertains the Duke of Wellington and other guests – including the Marquis of Waterford – before excusing himself to hold a secret meeting... with Chough and D'Urberville. Wayland has hired the two thugs to find Charlotte, and despite their failure he is confident that she will seek him out.

As storm-clouds gather, Charlotte is allowing the mysterious power of the Burning Truth to guide her. Springheel Jack, attracted by the mystical pendant, attacks the carriage in which she is travelling but Charlotte fends him off. The carriage crashes, and Charlotte continues her journey on foot.

Smith visits the Morgan Arms, and learns from the landlord, Burden, and barfly Tom Millbank, that the Duke of Wellington is to lead a hunt for Springheel Jack. Then he and Hooks hot-foot it to the scene of the crash and learn from the concussed coachman that his lady passenger was heading to Scratch Row – the location of the fire in which Smith's parents died.

Smith and Hooks catch up with Charlotte in a deserted church just in time to save her from Chough and D'Urberville. After knocking out the villains, the three heroes find a secret passage and discover a Black Mass in progress. The high priest is none other than Lord Wayland himself, and his ritual incantation causes the Burning Truth to emit an otherworldly noise, alerting the devil-worshipers to their presence. As a heavy stone door cuts off their escape, it looks like Smith is about to be crushed...

==== Episode 3: The Face of the Fiend ====
Smith, Hooks and Charlotte flee to the bell-tower with the Satanists in pursuit. Trapped in the belfry, Springheel Jack suddenly appears. The Satanists cower while our heroes escape across the rooftops. However, Hooks falls to his death, forcing Smith to give up the chase. An injured Jack meanwhile recovers in a side street, startling Lucy Scales who passes by his hiding place in Green Dragon Alley...

Smith goes to the Chief Constable to tell him all he knows, but the Chief informs him that Thomas Millbank has been arrested in connection with the latest attack on Jane Alsop, and the case is going to trial. Knowing that the real Springheel Jack is still out there, Smith and Charlotte return to the Morgan Arms to find out from Mr. Burden how Millbank came under suspicion. The culprits – Chough and D'Urberville – duly arrive and Smith stalls them while Charlotte escapes. Knocked unconscious and stuffed in a carriage, Smith is delivered to Lord Wayland at his riverside mansion, with Charlotte and the Burning Truth following at a discreet distance.

Smith is welcomed by Wayland, who believes that Springheel Jack is Lucifer himself. All Wayland now needs to meet his master face-to-face is the Burning Truth, and he suspends Smith above a vat of boiling oil in order to force its whereabouts out of him. Charlotte comes to Smith's rescue, and duly summons Springheel Jack with the pendant. After a tense confrontation between Wayland and Springheel Jack, Charlotte and Smith swing through the window and land in the Thames just as a desperate Wayland ignites the vat of oil and perishes in the fireball.

Racing to Lambeth Street Court, Smith and Charlotte arrive too late to affect the trial. However, Millbank has been cleared anyway due to his inability to breathe the blue flame. With the case officially closed, Charlotte returns to Europe and Smith is promoted on condition he keeps his mouth shut. But Smith's obsession to capture Springheel Jack has only just begun...

=== Series Two: The Legend of Springheel'd Jack ===
==== Episode 1: The Terror of London ====
Famed penny dreadful writer James Malcolm Rymer tells his 'one true story' which took place in 1845 when he was a struggling newspaper hack. His tale commences on Jacob's Island, Bermondsey, where a 13-year-old pickpocket, Maria Davis, is pursued by a spring-booted, fire-breathing maniac, and killed with a burst of flame. Inspector Garrick and Sergeant Skeres are already on the scene when Detective Inspector Jonah Smith arrives, tipped off at the alleged sighting of 'Springheel Jack'. Satisfied that the killer is an impostor, Smith makes his exit, bumping into the young Rymer who is there in his capacity as a freelance reporter. Despite Rymer's eagerness, Smith brushes him off and heads home. Frustrated by yet another dead end, the now heavy-drinking Smith is surprised by an unexpected visitor – Charlotte Fitzrandolph! Despite resenting her lack of contact over the past seven years, Smith is won over by her new lead on Springheel Jack. There seems to be a connection between authentic Springheel Jack sightings and the tour dates of a travelling theatre company known as the Harlequin Players. Smith agrees to meet Charlotte that night at a nearby penny gaff at the Fighting Cocks Inn where the Harlequin Players are due to perform.

That night, Smith senses Springheel Jack's presence and momentarily sees him atop a roof. With his hope rekindled, Smith becomes aware of footsteps following him and ambushes his stalker – Rymer! Despite Smith's initial misgivings, Rymer convinces him to let him tag along. They arrive at the penny gaff but Charlotte is nowhere to be seen. The Harlequin Player's master of ceremonies, Oscar Snitterfield, introduces the Punch and Judy show (in which the character of the Devil is now substituted with 'Springheel Jack') and afterwards they get chatting to the Punch and Judy Man himself, 'Professor' Elijah Hopcraft. The following magic act consists of doddery magician Cuthbert Leach, aka 'The Great Majesto' and his 'lovely assistant', the pugnacious Lizzie Coombe. When Lizzie's charms indirectly trigger a pub brawl, Smith makes himself scarce and goes in search of Charlotte. While a performance of The Murder in the Red Barn distracts the other patrons, Charlotte warns Smith that she has made a terrible mistake by confiding in a mysterious man she met in Paris. About to reveal his name, Charlotte is felled by a single gunshot. She survives just long enough to give Smith a cryptic clue to the mystery, then dies in his arms. Found over the body, the pub's denizens mistake Smith for the killer and chase him into the night...

==== Episode 2: The Carnival of Horrors ====
With Smith on the run, Garrick and Skeres are given the job of tracking him down. Smith, it transpires, has been secretly taken in by Lizzie and hidden from the other members of the theatre troupe at Bartholomew Fair. In exchange for her help in clearing his name, Lizzie wants Smith to help her find Springheel Jack, whom she blames for the death of Maria Davis. Maria was a member of the infamous pickpocketing gang, Dreadful Penny's Mob, and Lizzie reveals to Smith that she is the infamous Dreadful Penny herself. Smith agrees to join forces but first resolves to attend Charlotte's funeral, albeit in disguise.

Watching the funeral from a distance, Smith is surprised to find Hopcraft also present. Hopcraft admits that he's the man that Charlotte met in Paris and goes on to reveal that he, like Smith, also lost his parents in the Scratch Row fire and saw Springheel Jack rise from the flames. Hopcraft divulges to Smith that there were in fact two artifacts associated with the inferno at Scratch Row; the pendant known as the Burning Truth and a mysterious box about which much less is known. Hopcraft explains that while Springheel Jack has regained possession of the Burning Truth, he is still searching for his box... which is currently in the possession of Cuthbert. Hopcraft and Smith take seats in the audience of the magic act to observe the so-called 'Box of Emet' up close, when Smith accuses Hopcraft of killing Charlotte. Hopcraft brushes her murder aside and urges Smith to join forces with him. Smith refuses, and finding himself trapped between the police and the killer, Smith does the only thing he can think of: he volunteers to help Cuthbert in his next trick! Smith takes to the stage and allows Cuthbert to guide him through the magic act. When it comes to placing his hand on the Box of Emet, Smith experiences a rush of memories and psychic insights. Suddenly the fire-breathing, spring-booted Copycat Jack appears and tries to take the box. Before it can get close, the real Springheel Jack leaps into the scene and the two Jacks face off against each other. Hopcraft flees, Smith escapes and both Jacks leap away into the night, hunted by police and angry mobs.

Smith hides in a deserted attic space, and he realises too late that he's actually discovered Springheel Jack's rooftop lair. When Jack returns, Smith finds himself unexpectedly comforting the hulking being as an angry mob gets nearer. Smith urges Jack to keep quiet, emerges onto the rooftop and draws the mob away. He flees across the rooftops and eventually finds himself trapped on London Bridge. Smith professes his innocence and although Garrick now believes him, he knows he'll still hang for murder. Promising to solve the mystery once and for all, Smith steps away from his colleague and throws himself into the freezing Thames.

==== Episode 3: The Engine of Doom ====
The next day, Rymer bids farewell to Lizzie at Paddington Station. The Harlequin Players are taking the train to Slough to perform before Queen Victoria at Windsor Castle. As Rymer leaves, a very-much-alive Smith pulls him into an alley and tells him they have to prevent Cuthbert using the Box of Emet in the Queen's presence. Hopcraft also stows aboard, and just before the train departs Garrick gets on as well, ordering Sergeant Skeres to arrange for a detachment of soldiers to arrest Smith when they arrive at Slough.

Smith and Rymer find Lizzie and the three of them search the luggage van for the box. Instead they discover clues that show that the Copycat's costume is made up of discarded Harlequin Players props, and that the maniacal killer must therefore be one of the troupe. Cuthbert finds them in the van and after Lizzie fills him in, he shows them the trick with the box again. Smith theorises that only certain 'gifted' people can make the box 'sing', and moments later the four are attacked by the Copycat, who seizes the box and escapes to the next carriage. Lizzie grabs her pistol and gives chase, determined to avenge Maria's death. Cornering the Copycat, Lizzie removes its mask to reveal Ethel, the troupe's fortune-teller. The box emits an agonising signal which fatally injures the old lady, and before she dies she explains how the box has driven her mad. At this moment Garrick appears, but before he can arrest Smith, Hopcraft steals the box. Hopcraft fires a parting shot which hits Cuthbert, and Garrick and Smith go after him.

Hopcraft hijacks the train and lights the fuse on a barrel of gunpowder. Before he can uncouple the locomotive, Smith climbs aboard the train roof and reaches him. As they struggle, Garrick, Lizzie, Rymer and Oscar attempt to defuse the bomb. Hopcraft makes his escape by leaping off the train into Slough Weir. The others break through to the locomotive but the brakes have been damaged and the train can't be stopped. Cuthbert – mortally wounded – helps uncouple both the locomotive and the carriage containing the bomb, but necessarily has to stay with them. As the rest of the train decelerates, Cuthbert bids them goodbye and dies in the explosion.

Smith attempts to return the box to Springheel Jack, who has been following the whole time. However, the soldiers sent to arrest Smith arrive and scare Jack off. Smith and the other survivors decamp to the nearby Ostrich Inn, while the box is taken to Aldershot barracks. As the story comes to a close, the narrator – the old Rymer – reveals that Smith and Lizzie got married, and admits that while the truth about Spring-heeled Jack may be important to some, he is content with the legend.

=== Series Three: The Secret of Springheel'd Jack ===
==== Episode 1: The Peril of the Empires ====
United Kingdom, 1877. Springheel Jack attacks Aldershot barracks and despite huge resistance by the British army, steals back the Box of Emet. Word of the attack reaches Prime Minister Benjamin Disraeli from his Foreign Office adviser Anstruther, and he fears the Germans or Russians may be behind the raid. Anstruther thinks not, suspecting that the old rumours of Springheel Jack may be true, having been warned about this scenario by a missing agent of his, code-named 'Cheshire Cat'. He suggests to Disraeli that they seek out retired policeman Jonah Smith, who may be of help.

Anstruther seeks Smith out at his lodgings and discovers him to be an ageing, alcoholic widower, no longer interested in hunting Springheel Jack, and unwilling to help. What's more, Smith is terminally ill with tuberculosis and is deliberately drinking himself to death. Anstruther leaves Smith to himself, and Smith ponders why Jack has chosen now to reclaim the box. Meanwhile, the news of the Aldershot attack reaches Prussian spymistress, the Countess de Sadesky, who shares Smith's one-time obsession to capture Springheel Jack. She and her 'right hand', the lethal Jaeger, arrive in London by submarine and send their henchmen in search of Smith.

Smith drinks in his local pub and spills his heart out to Barney the landlord about his regret at not accepting Anstruther's mission. On his way home, Jaeger and sinister diplomat Vecht orchestrate his kidnap. Although Smith puts up a struggle, the Kaiser's agents take him back to the German embassy where, to the horror of the German Ambassador, they prepare to torture him. When Smith makes it clear he'd rather die than cooperate, Sadesky orders Vecht to kill their prisoner.

==== Episode 2: The Tunnels of Death ====
Before Vecht can kill Smith, one of his aides runs Vecht through with a sword-cane. The aide then releases Smith and reveals himself to be Anstruther's agent, 'Cheshire Cat', aka... Hopcraft! Smith and Hopcraft escape in a carriage with German agents close behind, and thanks to Hopcraft's ingenuity they lose them.

Once safe from their pursuers, Smith prepares to shoot Hopcraft and then himself, but Hopcraft warns him that Sadesky is seeking to obtain Springheel Jack's advanced technology in order to weaponize it, and that they must get to him before she does. Smith agrees grudgingly to help him stop her, so they report to Anstruther. Anstruther shows them an intercepted German telegraph that points to the abandoned Scratch Row underground railway station as Sadesky's next port of call.

Smith and Hopcraft return to Scratch Row and learn from the denizens of the local pub that 'Old Jack' haunts the tunnels. They break into the tube and go in search of Springheel Jack. Soon Sadesky and Jaeger arrive and follow them. Smith and Hopcraft's course takes them from the tube tunnels to the sewers, then to the lost River Effra, and finally into a forgotten mine. The Germans eventually catch them up and prepare to execute them. With no apparent means of escape, Smith uses his last bullet to cause a gigantic cave-in...

==== Episode 3: The Lords of the World ====
Smith and Hopcraft survive the cave-in, finding themselves on one side of the rock-slide and Sadesky and Jaeger on the other. Smith and Hopcraft have fallen through to a new tunnel of fused ceramic, created when something large and hot ploughed through the earth at high speed... on the night of the Scratch Row fire. They follow the tunnel into a huge cavern in which they discover a large, strange vessel: Springheel Jack's spacecraft.

Entering the spaceship, Smith and Hopcraft discover Jack in some kind of medical isolation chamber. He's ailing but the Burning Truth, now set in the Box of Emet, is emitting a signal to the heavens. At this moment, Sadesky and Jaeger catch up and attempt to take control of the ship. Sadesky reveals that rather than being mere German agents, she and Jaeger are in fact leaders of the Bavarian Illuminati, and intend to sell the secret of Jack's technology to the highest bidder, whether that be Germany, Russia or Great Britain. Despite Smith and Hopcraft's warnings, Sadesky tampers with the controls of Jack's isolation chamber, and the ship's automatic defences come to life and disintegrate her with a death ray. Jack himself then awakes and kills Jaeger before he can harm Smith. Jack then communicates with Smith telepathically; he needs a second pilot to fly his ship back home. Hopcraft pulls a knife on Smith and threatens to kill him unless Jack takes him instead. Jack refuses, but 'gifts' Hopcraft by touching his forehead and telling Smith that he has 'cured him'. Hopcraft drops the knife and lets Smith take his place in the cockpit. Understanding what Jack has done to Hopcraft, he gives his old enemy the Burning Truth and promises he'll return one day. Hopcraft flees the ship just before takeoff. Smith and Jack pilot the ship out of the cavern.

Hopcraft begins a decades-long wait for Smith to return, and realises that what Jack did to him was endow him with the seeds of a conscience. The recovering psychopath gradually rejoins the human race and over the years is tortured by remorse for his many crimes. Hopcraft becomes an old man but lives on in hope until, late in 1904, the Burning Truth returns to life. Drawn north to Liverpool, Hopcraft finds himself in Sefton Park during a fresh Springheel Jack scare, and is met by the spaceship as it returns. Smith emerges from the craft, only a few days having passed from his point of view, and together they bid a final farewell to Springheel Jack. The two old enemies – now friends – walk off into the night, musing whether Jack might ever return...

In a post-credits scene set on Barnes Common in 1977, a pair of government agents in a dummy TV detector van have a close encounter with another Spring-heeled Jack.

== Cast ==
=== Series One ===
- Jonah Smith – Christopher Finney
- Lord Wayland – Julian Glover
- Charlotte Fitzrandolph – Jessica Dennis
- Toby Hooks – Matthew Jure
- Chough – Jack Bowman
- D'Urberville – Ben Whitehead
- Chief Constable – Colin Holt
- Mrs Bairstow – Lizzie Goodall
- Mr Peewit – Simon Cruise Walters
- Mary Stevens – Ceri Gifford
- Burden, the Landlord – Trevor Cuthbertson
- Thomas Millbank – Jamie Cartwright
- Blackaby – Andrew MacBean
- Duke of Wellington – Nick Lucas
- Lucy Scales – Debbie Leigh-Simmons
- Jane Alsop – Mariele Runacre Temple
- Mr Hardwick/Fred – Jonathan Hansler
- Polly Adams – Caitlin Birley
- Sir John Cowan – David Benson
- Young Jonah – Charlie Adams

=== Series Two ===
- Jonah Smith – Christopher Finney
- James Malcolm Rymer – John Holden-White
- Lizzie Coombe – Josephine Timmins
- Cuthbert Leach – Nicholas Parsons
- Hopcraft – Andrew Shepherd
- Charlotte Fitzrandolph – Jessica Dennis
- Inspector Garrick – Neil McCormack
- Sergeant Skeres – Philip Lawrence
- Oscar Snitterfield – Jeremy Stockwell
- Ethel – Ashley McGuire
- Makepiece/Captain Dryden – Neil Frost
- Thackeray – Matthew Woodcock
- Foggarty – David Benson
- The Copycat/Mr. Punch – Jane Deane
- Maria Davis – Carina Reeves
- Constable Frizer/Station Guard – Silas Hawkins
- Private Irving – Stephen Brian Hill
- Private Brodribb – Mike Tomlinson

=== Series Three ===
- Jonah Smith – Christopher Finney
- Hopcraft – Andrew Shepherd
- The Countess de Sadesky – Jenny Runacre
- Benjamin Disraeli – David Benson
- Jaeger – Ben Whitehead
- German Ambassador – Matthew Kelly
- Anstruther – Jonathan Hansler
- Vecht – Paul Anthoney
- Private Bernard/Bob – Matthew Woodcock
- Private Francis/Gary – Tom Slatter
- Lieutenant Alfrey/Montagu – Louis Tamone
- Captain Hamilton – Anthony Sergeant
- Colour Sergeant/Bulstrode – Silas Hawkins
- Barney – Tony Parkin
- Mrs Bagstock – Maggie Robson
- Ponsonby – Clive Greenwood
- Alf – David Forest
- Queen Victoria – Katy Manning
- Mission Control – Shane Rimmer

== Reception ==
=== Awards and nominations ===
- The Strange Case of Springheel'd Jack won the Silver Ogle Award for Best Horror/Fantasy Audio in the World – 2011.
- The Strange Case of Springheel'd Jack was nominated for Best Drama Production at the British Public Radio Awards, 2013.
- The Legend of Springheel'd Jack won the Gold Ogle Award for Best Horror/Fantasy Audio in the World – 2013.
- The Secret of Springheel'd Jack: The Peril of the Empires / The Tunnels of Death won the Ogle Awards' Silver Award for Fantasy 2016.
- The Secret of Springheel'd Jack: The Tunnels of Death / The Lords of the World was a finalist in the 2017 New York Festivals World's Best Radio Programs Awards.

=== Cultural impact ===
The Springheel Saga features in the non-fiction book The Mystery of Spring-Heeled Jack: From Victorian Legend to Steampunk Hero by John Matthews (Destiny Books, 2016) as a key example of Spring-heeled Jack in contemporary fiction and culture.

In his 2017 article, Spring-heeled Jack: The Terror of Victorian England, Dr Karl Bell – author of The Legend of Spring-heeled Jack (Boydell & Brewer, 2013) – describes the series as the most notable example of Spring-heeled Jack's revival in twenty-first century fiction.
