= Neanderthals (anthology) =

1987 anthology of science fiction short stories

- Cover of first edition
- Editors: Robert Silverberg; Martin H. Greenberg; Charles G. Waugh
- Language: English
- Series: Isaac Asimov's Wonderful Worlds of Science Fiction
- Genre: Science fiction
- Publisher: Signet/New American Library
- Publication date: 1987
- Publication place: United States
- Media type: Print (paperback)
- Pages: 351
- ISBN: 0-451-14716-2
- Preceded by: Tin Stars
- Followed by: Space Shuttles

Neanderthals is an anthology of science fiction short stories edited by Robert Silverberg, Martin H. Greenberg and Charles G. Waugh as the sixth volume in the Isaac Asimov's Wonderful Worlds of Science Fiction series. It was first published in paperback by Signet/New American Library in February 1987.

The book collects eleven novellas, novelettes and short stories by various science fiction authors, together with an introduction by Isaac Asimov and an afterword by Silverberg.

== Contents ==
- "Introduction: Neanderthal Man" (Isaac Asimov)
- "Genesis" (H. Beam Piper)
- "The Ugly Little Boy" (Isaac Asimov)
- "The Long Remembering" (Poul Anderson)
- "The Apotheosis of Ki" (Miriam Allen deFord)
- "Man o' Dreams" (Will McMorrow)
- "The Treasure of Odirex" (Charles Sheffield)
- "The Ogre" (Avram Davidson)
- "Alas, Poor Yorick" (Thomas A. Easton)
- "The Gnarly Man" (L. Sprague de Camp)
- "The Hairy Parents" (A. Bertram Chandler)
- "The Alley Man" (Philip José Farmer)
- "Afterword: The Valley of Neander" (Robert Silverberg)
