= The Legend and Bizarre Crimes of Spring Heeled Jack =

1977 non-fiction book by Peter Haining

- Cover of first edition
- Author: Peter Haining
- Language: English
- Publisher: Frederick Muller Ltd
- Publication date: 21 Nov. 1977
- Publication place: United Kingdom
- Media type: Print (hardcover)
- Pages: 179 pp.
- ISBN: 978-0584102765

The Legend and Bizarre Crimes of Spring Heeled Jack is a non-fiction book by Peter Haining, published by Frederick Muller in 1977. It is notable for being the first full-length book about the Spring-heeled Jack legend, but is notorious for its numerous uncited claims and fabrications, being the earliest identifiable source of several elements of Spring-heeled Jack fakelore.

== Content ==
The book begins by examining some of the earliest sightings of Spring-heeled Jack, suggesting that there may have been numerous culprits, including Henry de La Poer Beresford, the 'Mad' Marquess of Waterford. In later chapters it describes Spring-heeled Jack's transformation into a star of Victorian melodrama, before finally going on to explore some of the stranger theories about his identity, including the idea that he was a visitor from outer space.

== Criticism ==
Researcher and historian Mike Dash, in his research article, Spring-heeled Jack: To Victorian Bugaboo from Suburban Ghost, published in Fortean Studies, vol. 3 (1996), identifies three key elements of the legend as described by Haining for which he was unable to find any prior record, leading him to conclude that they were all inventions on Haining's part. The first was the attack on farmer's daughter, 'Polly Adams', an uncorroborated incident which, according to Haining, occurred on 11 October 1837. As well as being a heavily fictionalised account of supposedly historical events, it asserts that 'Polly' was able to identify her attacker as a man she had seen earlier that evening; namely the Marquess of Waterford. The second is an embellishment of a documented attack on a servant boy at 2 Turner Street on 25 February 1838, of which Haining makes the claim that the boy reported seeing an initial 'W' in gold filigree on the folds of his assailant's cloak. Dash considers both of these examples as dubious attempts to bolster the popular theory that Spring-heeled Jack was indeed the Marquess of Waterford. The third episode, once again seemingly made up by Haining, is the alleged murder of thirteen-year-old prostitute, 'Maria Davis', in Folly Ditch, Jacob's Island on 12 November 1845. Dash goes on to reveal that he corresponded with Haining in 1996 in the hope of gaining access to his sources in order to corroborate his claims, but Haining was not able to furnish him with any, explaining that several years earlier he had lent all his research material to a scriptwriter and it had subsequently been lost.

Cultural and social historian, Karl Bell, in The Legend of Spring-heeled Jack: Victorian urban folklore and popular cultures (Boydell Press, 2012), casts doubt on Haining's claim that the first proper dramatic treatment of Spring-heeled Jack was a play called Spring Heeled Jack, The Terror of London, allegedly written by John Thomas Haines in 1840. While Haining claims that the play was 'an enormous success mainly because of the clever use of scenery and special effects', Bell can find no evidence of its existence, maintaining that plays featuring Spring-heeled Jack were rare until the 1860s.

== Influence ==
The character of Polly Adams and the murder of Maria Davis were both used in the audio drama series, The Springheel Saga.
