= Space Shuttles (anthology) =

- Cover of first edition
- Editors: Isaac Asimov; Martin H. Greenberg; Charles G. Waugh
- Language: English
- Series: Isaac Asimov's Wonderful Worlds of Science Fiction
- Genre: Science fiction
- Publisher: Signet/New American Library
- Publication date: 1987
- Publication place: United States
- Media type: Print (paperback)
- Pages: 384 pp.
- ISBN: 0-451-15017-1
- Preceded by: Neanderthals
- Followed by: Monsters

Space Shuttles is an anthology of science fiction short stories edited by Isaac Asimov, Martin H. Greenberg and Charles G. Waugh as the seventh volume in their Isaac Asimov's Wonderful Worlds of Science Fiction series. It was first published in paperback by Signet/New American Library in October 1987.

The book collects fourteen novellas, novelettes and short stories by various science fiction authors, together with an introduction by Asimov.

== Contents ==
- "Introduction: Shuttles" (Isaac Asimov)
- "Truck Driver" (Robert Chilson)
- "Hermes to the Ages" (Frederick D. Gottfried)
- "Pushbutton War" (Joseph P. Martino)
- "The Last Shuttle" (Isaac Asimov)
- "The Getaway Special" (Jerry Oltion)
- "Between a Rock and a High Place" (Timothy Zahn)
- "To Grab Power" (Hayden Howard)
- "Coming of Age in Henson's Tube" (William Jon Watkins)
- "Deborah's Children" (Grant D. Callin)
- "The Book of Baraboo" (Barry B. Longyear)
- "The Speckled Gantry" (Joseph Green and Patrice Milton)
- "The Nanny" (Thomas Wylde)
- "Hitchhiker" (Sheila Finch)
- "Dead Ringer" (Edward Wellen)
