= Tin Stars =

Science fiction anthology

- Cover of first edition
- Editors: Isaac Asimov; Martin H. Greenberg; Charles G. Waugh
- Language: English
- Series: Isaac Asimov's Wonderful Worlds of Science Fiction
- Genre: Science fiction
- Publisher: Signet/New American Library
- Publication date: 1986
- Publication place: United States
- Media type: Print (paperback)
- Pages: 351
- ISBN: 0-451-14395-7
- Preceded by: Comets
- Followed by: Neanderthals

Tin Stars is an anthology of science fiction short stories edited by Isaac Asimov, Martin H. Greenberg and Charles G. Waugh as the fifth volume in their Isaac Asimov's Wonderful Worlds of Science Fiction series. It was first published in paperback by Signet/New American Library in July 1986.

The book collects fifteen novellas, novelettes and short stories by various science fiction authors, together with an introduction by Asimov.

== Contents ==
- "Introduction" (Isaac Asimov)
- "Into the Shop" (Ron Goulart)
- "Cloak of Anarchy" (Larry Niven)
- "The King's Legions" (Christopher Anvil)
- "Finger of Fate" (Edward Wellen)
- "Arm of the Law" (Harry Harrison)
- "Voiceover" (Edward Wellen)
- "The Fastest Draw" (Larry Eisenberg)
- "Mirror Image" (Isaac Asimov)
- "Brillo" (Ben Bova and Harlan Ellison)
- "The Powers of Observation" (Harry Harrison)
- "Faithfully Yours" (Lou Tabakow)
- "Safe Harbor" (Donald Wismer)
- "Examination Day" (Henry Slesar)
- "The Cruel Equations" (Robert Sheckley)
- "Animal Lover" (Stephen R. Donaldson)
