= The Science Fictional Olympics =

Science fiction anthology

- Cover of first edition
- Editors: Isaac Asimov; Martin H. Greenberg; Charles G. Waugh
- Cover artist: Paul Alexander
- Language: English
- Series: Isaac Asimov's Wonderful Worlds of Science Fiction
- Genre: Science fiction
- Publisher: Signet/New American Library
- Publication date: 1984
- Publication place: United States
- Media type: Print (paperback)
- Pages: viii, 356
- ISBN: 0-451-12976-8
- Preceded by: Intergalactic Empires
- Followed by: Supermen

The Science Fictional Olympics is an anthology of science fiction short stories edited by Isaac Asimov, Martin H. Greenberg, and Charles G. Waugh as the second volume in their Isaac Asimov's Wonderful Worlds of Science Fiction series. It was first published in paperback by Signet/New American Library in June 1984. It has been translated into Italian in the series Urania.

The book collects sixteen novelettes and short stories by various science fiction authors, with an introduction by Asimov.

== Contents ==
- "Introduction: Competition!" (Isaac Asimov)
- "Run to Starlight" (George R. R. Martin)
- "The Mickey Mouse Olympics" (Tom Sullivan)
- "Dream Fighter" (Bob Shaw)
- "The Kokod Warriors" (Jack Vance)
- "Getting Through University" (Piers Anthony)
- "For the Sake of Grace" (Suzette Haden Elgin)
- "The National Pastime" (Norman Spinrad)
- "A Day for Dying" (Charles Nuetzel)
- "The People Trap" (Robert Sheckley)
- "Why Johnny Can't Speed" (Alan Dean Foster)
- "Nothing in the Rules" (L. Sprague de Camp)
- "The Olympians" (Mike Resnick)
- "The Wind from the Sun" (Arthur C. Clarke)
- "Prose Bowl" (Bill Pronzini and Barry N. Malzberg)
- "From Downtown at the Buzzer" (George Alec Effinger)
- "A Glint of Gold" (Nicholas V. Yermakov)
- "The Survivor" (Walter F. Moudy)
