= Intergalactic Empires =

1983 science fiction anthology

- Cover of first edition
- Editors: Isaac Asimov; Martin H. Greenberg; Charles G. Waugh
- Cover artist: Paul Alexander
- Language: English
- Series: Isaac Asimov's Wonderful Worlds of Science Fiction
- Genre: Science fiction
- Publisher: Signet/New American Library
- Publication date: 1983
- Publication place: United States
- Media type: Print (paperback)
- Pages: 303
- ISBN: 0-451-12624-6
- Preceded by: none
- Followed by: The Science Fictional Olympics

Intergalactic Empires is an anthology of science fiction short stories edited by Isaac Asimov, Martin H. Greenberg and Charles G. Waugh as the first volume in their Isaac Asimov's Wonderful Worlds of Science Fiction series. It was first published in paperback by Signet/New American Library in December 1983. The first British edition was issued in paperback by Robinson in July 1988.

The book collects nine novellas, novelettes and short stories by various science fiction authors, together with an introduction by Asimov and three sectional introductions.

== Contents ==
- "Introduction: Empires" (Isaac Asimov)
- "Cycles"
  - "Chalice of Death" (Robert Silverberg)
  - "Orphan of the Void" (Lloyd Biggle, Jr.)
  - "Down to the Worlds of Men" (Alexei Panshin)
- "Governance"
  - "Ministry of Disturbance" (H. Beam Piper)
  - "Blind Alley" (Isaac Asimov)
  - "A Planet Named Shayol" (Cordwainer Smith)
- "Concerns"
  - "Diabologic" (Eric Frank Russell)
  - "Fighting Philosopher" (E. B. Cole)
  - "Honorable Enemies" (Poul Anderson)
