= Invasions (anthology) =

- Cover of first edition
- Editors: Isaac Asimov; Martin H. Greenberg; Charles G. Waugh
- Cover artist: Paul Alexander
- Language: English
- Series: Isaac Asimov's Wonderful Worlds of Science Fiction
- Genre: Science fiction
- Publisher: Roc/New American Library
- Publication date: 1990
- Publication place: United States
- Media type: Print (paperback)
- Pages: 382
- ISBN: 0-451-45027-2
- Preceded by: Robots

Invasions is an anthology of science fiction short stories edited by Isaac Asimov, Martin H. Greenberg and Charles G. Waugh as the tenth and last volume in their Isaac Asimov's Wonderful Worlds of Science Fiction series. It was first published in paperback by Roc/New American Library in August 1990, with the first British edition issued in paperback by Robinson at the same time.

The book collects fifteen novellas, novelettes and short stories by various science fiction authors, together with an introduction by Asimov.

== Contents ==
- "Introduction" (Isaac Asimov)
- "Living Space" (Isaac Asimov)
- Asylum" (A. E. van Vogt)
- Exposure" (Eric Frank Russell)
- Invasion of Privacy" (Bob Shaw)
- What Have I Done?" (Mark Clifton)
- Impostor" (Philip K. Dick)
- The Soul-Empty Ones" (Walter M. Miller, Jr.)
- The Cloud-Men: Being a Foreprint from the London News Sheet #1" (Owen Oliver)
- Stone Man" (Fred Saberhagen)
- For I Am a Jealous People!" (Lester del Rey)
- Don't Look Now" (Henry Kuttner)
- The Certificate" (Avram Davidson)
- The Alien Rulers" (Piers Anthony)
- Squeeze Box" (Philip E. High)
- The Liberation of Earth" (William Tenn)
