= My Favorite Fantasy Story =

- Cover illustration of My Favorite Fantasy Story
- Editor: Martin H. Greenberg
- Cover artist: Les Edwards
- Language: English
- Genre: Fantasy
- Publisher: DAW Books
- Publication date: 2000
- Publication place: United States
- Media type: Print (Paperback)
- Pages: 423 pp
- ISBN: 0-88677-905-7

My Favorite Fantasy Story is an anthology of fantasy short stories, edited by Martin H. Greenberg. It was first published in paperback by DAW Books in August 2000, and reprinted by ibooks in July 2004.

== Summary ==
The book collects eighteen "[a]ward-winning, career-changing, classic stories" by "masters" of the genre, "[p]ersonally selected by such modern-day greats as: Morgan Llywelyn, Terry Pratchett, Tanya Huff, Charles de Lint, George R. R. Martin, Katherine Kurtz, Marion Zimmer Bradley [and] Margaret Weis," some of whom also authored some of the stories. Pieces included range in length from short stories to novelettes to one novel (Mopsa the Fairy), with the time span of their original publications ranging from 1837 to 1992.

== Contents ==
- "Ghosts of Wind and Shadow" (Charles de Lint) - selected by Tanya Huff
- "Mazirian the Magician" (Jack Vance) - selected by Robert Silverberg
- "Troll Bridge" (Terry Pratchett) - selected by Michelle West
- "The Tale of Hauk" (Poul Anderson) - selected by Mickey Zucker Reichert
- "In Our Block" (R. A. Lafferty) - selected by Neil Gaiman
- "The Gnarly Man" (L. Sprague de Camp) - selected by Terry Pratchett
- "'Oh, Whistle, and I'll Come to You, My Lad'" (M. R. James) - selected by Morgan Llywelyn
- "Homeland" (Barbara Kingsolver) - selected by Charles de Lint
- "Stealing God" (Debra Doyle and James D. Macdonald) - selected by Katherine Kurtz
- "Shadowlands" (Elisabeth Waters) - selected by Marion Zimmer Bradley
- Mopsa the Fairy (Jean Ingelow) - selected by Gene Wolfe
- "Liane the Wayfarer" (Jack Vance) - selected by George R. R. Martin
- "The Spring" (Manly Wade Wellman) - selected by Andre Norton
- "That Hell-Bound Train" (Robert Bloch) - selected by Rick Hautala
- "The Dancer from the Dance" (M. John Harrison) - selected by Stephen R. Donaldson
- "More Spinned Against" (John Wyndham) - selected by Matt Costello
- "The Bagman's Story" (Charles Dickens) - selected by Margaret Weis
- "Unicorn Variations" (Roger Zelazny) - selected by Fred Saberhagen
