= Supermen (anthology) =

Science fiction anthology by Isaac Asimov

- Cover of first edition
- Editors: Isaac Asimov; Martin H. Greenberg; Charles G. Waugh
- Language: English
- Series: Isaac Asimov's Wonderful Worlds of Science Fiction
- Genre: Science fiction
- Publisher: Signet/New American Library
- Publication date: 1984
- Publication place: United States
- Media type: Print (paperback)
- Pages: 350
- ISBN: 0-451-13201-7
- Preceded by: The Science Fictional Olympics
- Followed by: Comets

Supermen is an anthology of science fiction short stories edited by Isaac Asimov, Martin H. Greenberg and Charles G. Waugh as the third volume in their Isaac Asimov's Wonderful Worlds of Science Fiction series. It was first published in paperback by Signet/New American Library in October 1984. The first British edition was issued in paperback by Robinson in 1988.

The book collects twelve novellas, novelettes and short stories by various science fiction authors, together with an introduction by Asimov.

== Contents ==
- "Introduction: Super" (Isaac Asimov)
- "Angel, Dark Angel" (Roger Zelazny)
- "Worlds to Kill" (Harlan Ellison)
- "In the Bone" (Gordon R. Dickson)
- "What Rough Beast?" (Damon Knight)
- "Death by Ecstasy" (Larry Niven)
- "Un-Man" (Poul Anderson)
- "Muse" (Dean R. Koontz)
- "Resurrection" (A. E. van Vogt)
- "Pseudopath" (Philip E. High)
- "After the Myths Went Home" (Robert Silverberg)
- "Before the Talent Dies" (Henry Slesar)
- "Brood World Barbarian" (Perry A. Chapdelaine)
