= Robots (Asimov anthology) =

Collection of science fiction works

- Cover of first edition
- Editors: Isaac Asimov; Martin H. Greenberg; Charles G. Waugh
- Cover artist: J. K. Potter
- Language: English
- Series: Isaac Asimov's Wonderful Worlds of Science Fiction
- Genre: Science fiction
- Publisher: Signet/New American Library
- Publication date: 1989
- Publication place: United States
- Media type: Print (paperback)
- Pages: 351
- ISBN: 0-451-15926-8
- Preceded by: Monsters
- Followed by: Invasions

Robots is an anthology of science fiction short stories edited by Isaac Asimov, Martin H. Greenberg and Charles G. Waugh as the ninth volume in their Isaac Asimov's Wonderful Worlds of Science Fiction series. It was first published in paperback by Signet/New American Library in April 1989. The first British edition was issued in paperback by Robinson in 1989.

The book collects seventeen novelettes and short stories by various science fiction authors, together with an introduction by Asimov.

== Contents ==
- "Introduction: Robots" (Isaac Asimov)
- "The Tunnel Under the World" (Frederik Pohl)
- "Brother Robot" (Henry Slesar)
- "The Lifeboat Mutiny" (Robert Sheckley)
- "The Warm Space" (David Brin)
- "How-2" (Clifford D. Simak)
- "Too Robot to Marry" (George H. Smith)
- "The Education of Tigress McCardle" (C. M. Kornbluth)
- "Sally" (Isaac Asimov)
- "Breakfast of Champions" (Thomas A. Easton)
- "Sun Up" (A. A. Jackson, IV and Howard Waldrop)
- "Second Variety" (Philip K. Dick)
- "The Problem Was Lubrication" (David R. Bunch)
- "First to Serve" (Algis Budrys)
- "Two-Handed Engine" (C. L. Moore and Henry Kuttner)
- "Though Dreamers Die" (Lester del Rey)
- "Soldier Boy" (Michael Shaara)
- "Farewell to the Master" (Harry Bates)
