= Wireless Theatre Company =

- Type: Private company
- Industry: Entertainment
- Founded: 2007
- Headquarters: London, UK
- Key people: Mariele Runacre Temple, Artistic Director; David Beck, Director; Jack Bowman, Director/Producer; Cherry Cookson, Director/Producer; Tshari King, Sound Engineer/Sound Designer; Gareth Brown, Lighting Designer; Robert Valentine, Director/Producer
- Website: www.wirelesstheatrecompany.co.uk

The Wireless Theatre Company is an online audio theatre company specializing in creating modern audio drama. It was founded in July 2007 by Mariele Runacre Temple, daughter of actress Jenny Runacre.

== Overview ==
The company produces radio drama, audio comedy and short stories for digital download in MP3 format, creating a modern forum for radio productions and specialises in new writing from international authors, originally beginning as a not-for-profit company. In February 2008, Nicholas Parsons became patron of the company, recorded an interview and appeared at the company's official launch party in July 2008, along with Richard O'Brien.

It has showcased as of the end of 2013, 177 actors (a mix of established names - see below - and new performers to audio), as well as 43 new writers and 35 crew members and had won several radio awards and nominations for its output, all "designed to nurture and encourage fresh new writers, up and coming acting talent and bring audio theatre to the 'iPod generation'". Its recent output was named as one of the Best Twenty Radio Productions of 2012, while Mariele Runacre Temple was placed on the top 200 Sound Women List. It is a member of the Radio Independents Group and in 2011 won a place on the BBC Radio Preferred Supplier's List.

As of the end of 2013, the current website is visited by 15,000 unique visitors per month, of which 7% become subscribers.

== Notable developments (2008–2016) ==
In May 2008, Prunella Scales starred in its production of the Youth of Old Age with Knight Mantell and directed The Ceremony, which featured Jenny Runacre. Wireless Theatre Company has also worked with Julian Glover, David Benson, Timothy West, Christopher Timothy and Josephine Tewson. Glover worked on the company's first audio series, The Strange Case of Springheel'd Jack – the first series of The Springheel Saga – based around the legend of Springheeled Jack.

The Wireless Theatre Company has been featured in Metro and Live Radio Theatre? The Perfect Night Out or In in The Guardian.

Since early 2015 Wireless Theatre have been producing full length multi-cast dramas for Audible UK, including Passenger 23 starring Max Beesley and Rebecca Hall and the double Audie Award winning Jungle Book, The Mowgli Stories starring Bill Bailey, Richard E Grant and Martin Shaw.

== Notable contributors ==
The Wireless Theatre Company has attracted several notable contributors; in 2012 Stephen Fry recorded a guest appearance, playing a fictional version of himself, in the company's production of "We Are The BBC".

Contributor	Production or Role	Year
Nicholas Parsons	Company Patron; performing in "We Are The BBC", "The Springheel Saga, Series Two: The Legend Of Springheel'd Jack"	2008, 2012, 2013–2014
Richard O'Brien	Writer of "Pig In Boots", London Horror Festival Judge	2008, 2012
Kim Newman	London Horror Festival Judge	2013
Prunella Scales	Performing in "The Youth of Old Age", "On Three, Seasons"; Director of "The Ceremony"	2009
Timothy West	"On Three", "Seasons"	2009
Jenny Runacre	"The Ceremony", "Shared", "The Springheel Saga, Series Three: The Secret Of Springheel'd Jack"	2014
Josephine Tewson	"Leaves In The Wind"	2009
Julian Glover	"The Springheel Saga, Series One: The Strange Case Of Springheel'd Jack"	2011-2012
David Benson	"Spook Squad", "The Springheel Saga, Series One, Two & Three"	2008, 2010, 2013, 2014
Abi Titmuss	"Stage Fright"	2010
Lionel Blair	"Gino Ginelli Is Still Dead"	2011
Rula Lenska	"Shared"	2011
Gordon Kennedy	"The Maiden Without Hands"	2011
Christopher Timothy	"We Are Not The BBC"	2011
John Antrobus	Director/Co-writer of "Not Tonight Caligula"	2010
Ray Galton	Co-writer of "Not Tonight Caligula"	2010
Stephen Fry	"We Are The BBC"	2012
Linda Robson	"Gino Ginelli Lives!"	2012
Shane Rimmer	"The Mighty Carlins"	2013
Brian Blessed	Narrator of "Life At Death's Door", performer in "Dead London"	2013
Matthew Kelly	"The Springheel Saga, Series Three: The Secret Of Springheel'd Jack"	2015-2016
Jo Brand	Narrator of "Life At Death's Door II"	2015
Dominic West	"Les Liaisons Dangereuses", Wireless Theatre for Audible UK	2015
Bill Bailey	"The Jungle Book, The Mowgli Stories", Wireless Theatre for Audible UK	2016
Derek Jacobi	Narrator in "A Christmas Carol", Wireless Theatre for Audible UK	2016
Nigel Planer	"The Chief"	2016
Alison Steadman	"Ladies"	2017
Ben Miles	"Just One Damned Thing After Another" for Audible UK	2017
Gemma Whelan	"Just One Damned Thing After Another" for Audible UK	2017
Tom Conti	"Murder on the Orient Express" for Audible UK	2017
Eddie Marsan	"Murder on the Orient Express" for Audible UK	2017
Sophie Okonedo	"Murder on the Orient Express" for Audible UK	2017
Philip Glenister	"Treasure Island" for Audible UK	2017
Daniel Mays	"Treasure Island" for Audible UK	2017
Catherine Tate	"Treasure Island" for Audible UK	2017
William Hope	"Red Moon"	2018

== Wireless Theatre Live ==
The company launched its LIVE recordings in 2008, the first being the Wireless Theatre Company pantomime, Pig in Boots written by Richard O'Brien in December 2008. Live productions include The Grimm of Stottesden Hall, loosely based on the stories of Edgar Allan Poe, and 2010: Space Commander!, both written by Stuart Price. The company produced a live radio recording of Frankie Howerd's play Not Tonight Caligula by Ray Galton and John Antrobus at Leicester Square Theatre, London, and a second Halloween special entitled Phonophobia, co-written by Robert Valentine and Gareth Parker. In 2011, it undertook a season of live recordings of Grimm's Fairytales at the Roundhouse Theatre, while since 2012 it has launched the London Horror Festival. 2013 saw live shows produced by Wireless Theatre in London (including a "Sci-Fi Showcase" and a "36 Hour Theatre Challenge" at the LOST Theatre) and at the Buxton Festival.

== Wireless Theatre Kids ==
In November 2010 the company launched Wireless Theatre Kids to produce original radio drama and stories for children.

== Awards and nominations ==
Since 2009 The Wireless Theatre Company has received several award nominations and awards, most notably in 2011 when it won Best Entertainment Producer and Best Online Multi-Platform Creator at The Radio Academy Radio Production Awards and in 2016 when it won two Audie awards for The Jungle Book, The Mowgli Stories produced for Audible UK.

Award	Organisation/Year	Nomination	Win
Best Radio Drama Producer	Fringe Report Awards, 2009	Mariele Runacre Temple	Won
Best Entertainment Producer	Radio Production Awards, 2011	Mariele Runacre Temple	Won
Best Online Platform	Radio Production Awards, 2011	Mariele Runacre Temple	Won
Best Drama Producer	Radio Production Awards, 2011	Mariele Runacre Termple, Robert Valentine, Jack Bowman	Nomination
Best Creative	Radio Production Awards, 2011	Jack Bowman	Nomination
Silver Award - Best Fantasy Audio Production	Mark Time Ogles, 2011	The Springheel Saga: The Strange Case Of Springheel'd Jack	Won
Best Drama Production	British Public Radio Awards, 2013	The Springheel Saga: The Strange Case Of Springheel'd Jack	Nomination
Best Entertainment Production	British Public Radio Awards, 2013	Radio Hoo-Haa	Nomination
Best Documentary (Long-form)	British Public Radio Awards, 2013	Life At Death's Door	Won
Best Production	War Of The Worlds 75, 2013	Dead London	Won
Gold Award - Best Fantasy Audio Production	Mark Time Ogles, 2013	The Springheel Saga: The Legend Of Springheel'd Jack	Won
Best SF/Fantasy Award	Outpost Skaro, 2014	The Springheel Saga	Won
Best Drama Producer	Audio Production Awards, 2015	Cherry Cookson	Nominated
Best Drama	Audie Awards, 2016	The Jungle Book, The Mowgli Stories	Won
Excellence In Production	Audie Awards, 2016	The Jungle Book, The Mowgli Stories	Won
Silver - Best Drama Special	New York Festival Awards, 2016	The Murder of Roger Ackroyd	Won
Silver - Best Fantasy Audio Production	Mark Time Ogles, 2016	The Springheel Saga: Series Three	Won
Best Audio Drama Production Company, UK	TMT Media Awards 2016 (vanity award)	Wireless Theatre Company	Won
Most Outstanding Radio Drama Production Co.	AI Global Excellence Awards, 2016 (vanity award)	Wireless Theatre Company	Won
Best Multi-Voiced Performance	Audie Awards, 2017	Les Liaisons Dangereuses	Nominated
Drama	New York Festivals World's Best Radio Programs Awards 2017	The Secret of Springheel'd Jack: The Tunnels of Death / The Lords of the World	Finalist
Best Podcast or Online Audio Drama	BBC Audio Drama Awards, 2019	Red Moon	Won

== 2013 - Current (Documentaries, BBC Radio 4, Audible, New Model and Relaunch) ==
2013 saw the company branch into documentaries, beginning with "Life At Death's Door", narrated by Brian Blessed, followed by "The Springheel Files", narrated by Cameron K. McEwan.

October saw its first production broadcast on BBC Radio 4 as part of the Wednesday Afternoon Play, written by Marty Ross, a dramatic adaptation of "The Lady Macbeth Of Mtsensk", directed by Cherry Cookson.

In the summer of 2013, it was announced that The Wireless Theatre Company would change its business model, relaunching as Wireless Theatre Ltd. This decision was made to help increase production and support the actors, writers and crew involved in the company, and as such, was seeking investment as a result, a move supported by Parsons as Company Patron in an online video. As such, in December 2013, Wireless Theatre ceased to be a not-for-profit company and became a subscription-based audio platform.

At the end of 2013, it finished the year with releasing "Cross Party" co-written by Tom Harris (British politician) with his wife, Carolyn and the second series of The Springheel Saga, The Legend Of Springheel'd Jack, featuring Nicholas Parsons. From 2015 to present day it combines in-house productions for the website subscribers with large-scale productions for Audible UK. The company has also partnered with AudioBoom to offer free drama and behind the scenes extras.
