= Human? =

- First edition cover
- Author: Judith Merril, editor
- Cover artist: R. DeSaint
- Language: English
- Genre: science fiction and fantasy short stories
- Publisher: Lion Books
- Publication date: 1954
- Publication place: United States
- Media type: Print (paperback)
- Pages: 190 pp
- OCLC: 1869094

Human? is an anthology of science fiction and fantasy stories edited by Judith Merril, published as a paperback original by Lion Books in 1954. No further editions were issued.

== Contents ==
- "Introduction", Fredric Brown
- "I: As Others See Us…", Judith Merril
- "The Big Contest", John D. MacDonald (Worlds Beyond 1950)
- "The Boy Next Door", Chad Oliver (F&SF 1951)
- "Take a Seat", Eric Frank Russell (Startling Stories 1952)
- "An Egg a Month from All Over", Idris Seabright (F&SF 1952)
- "Riya’s Foundling", Algis Budrys (Science Fiction Stories #1 1953)
- "II: Earthlings All", Judith Merril
- "ghosts", Don Marquis (Archy and Mehitabel, 1927)
- "Smoke Ghost", Fritz Leiber (Unknown 1941)
- "Who Shall I Say Is Calling?", August Derleth (F&SF 1952)
- "The Gnarly Man", L. Sprague de Camp (Unknown 1939)
- "The Temptation of Harringay", H. G. Wells (The St. James’s Gazette 1895)
- "The Ultimate Egoist", Theodore Sturgeon (Unknown 1941)
- "Rope Enough", John Collier (The New Yorker 1939)
- "III: Tomorrow Will Be Better?", Judith Merril
- "Liar!", Isaac Asimov (Astounding 1941)
- "Who Knows His Brother", Graham Doar (Startling Stories 1952)
- "Crucifixus Etiam", Walter M. Miller, Jr. (Astounding 1953)

== Reception ==
P. Schuyler Miller, declaring that Merril "has [n]ever edited a bad anthology, or even a so-so one", described this theme anthology as "span[ning] the gap from H. G. Wells to 1953."
