= Timescapes: Stories of Time Travel =

1997 anthology by Peter Haining

- Cover of first edition
- Author: edited by Peter Haining
- Language: English
- Genre: Science fiction
- Publisher: Souvenir Press
- Publication date: 1997
- Publication place: United Kingdom
- Media type: Print (hardcover)
- Pages: 288 pp.
- ISBN: 0-285-63387-2

Timescapes: Stories of Time Travel is an anthology of science fiction short stories on time travel edited by Peter Haining. It was first published in the United Kingdom hardcover by Souvenir Press in August 1997. The first American edition was issued in hardcover under the alternate title Time Travelers: Fiction in the Fourth Dimension by Barnes & Noble Books in 1998.

The book collects twenty four novelettes and short stories by various science fiction authors, with an introduction by the editor.

== Contents ==
- "Introduction" (Peter Haining)
- "A Little Something for Us Tempunauts" (Philip K. Dick)
- "Mr. Strenberry's Tale" (J. B. Priestley)
- "All the Time in the World" (Arthur C. Clarke)
- "The Instability" (Isaac Asimov)
- "Time Has No Boundaries" (Jack Finney)
- "She Caught Hold of the Toe" (Richard Hughes)
- "The Reason Is with Us" (James E. Gunn)
- "Man in His Time" (Brian W. Aldiss)
- "The Clock That Went Backwards" (Edward Page Mitchell)
- "A Gun for Dinosaur" (L. Sprague de Camp)
- "The Deadly Mission of Phineas Snodgrass" (Frederik Pohl)
- "Of Time and Kathy Benedict" (William F. Nolan)
- "Production Problem" (Robert F. Young)
- "I Hear You Calling" (Eric Frank Russell)
- "The Men Who Murdered Mohammed" (Alfred Bester)
- "Time Intervening" (Ray Bradbury)
- "The Grey Man" (H. G. Wells)
- "Flux" (Michael Moorcock (and Barrington J. Bayley))
- "The Greatest Television Show on Earth" (J. G. Ballard)
- "Through Time and Space with Ferdinand Feghoot: XXXV" (Grendel Briarton)
- "Time Bum" (C. M. Kornbluth)
- "All You Zombies—" (Robert A. Heinlein)
- "The Gernsback Continuum" (William Gibson)
- "The Time Disease" (Martin Amis)
