= Comets (anthology) =

1986 anthology of science fiction short stories

- Cover of first edition
- Editors: Isaac Asimov; Martin H. Greenberg; Charles G. Waugh
- Language: English
- Series: Isaac Asimov's Wonderful Worlds of Science Fiction
- Genre: Science fiction
- Publisher: Signet/New American Library
- Publication date: 1986
- Publication place: United States
- Media type: Print (paperback)
- Pages: 339 pp.
- ISBN: 0-451-14129-6
- Preceded by: Supermen
- Followed by: Tin Stars

Comets is an anthology of science fiction short stories edited by Isaac Asimov, Martin H. Greenberg and Charles G. Waugh as the fourth volume in their Isaac Asimov's Wonderful Worlds of Science Fiction series. It was first published in paperback by Signet/New American Library in February 1986.

The book collects twenty novelettes and short stories by various science fiction authors, together with an introduction by Asimov.

== Contents ==
- "Introduction: Comets" (Isaac Asimov)
- "A Blazing Starre Seene in the West" (Jonas Wright)
- "Into the Sun" (Robert Duncan Milne)
- "Captain Stormfield's Visit to Heaven" (Mark Twain)
- "The Comet Doom" (Edmond Hamilton)
- "Sunspot" (Hal Clement)
- "Inside the Comet" (Arthur C. Clarke)
- "Raindrop" (Hal Clement)
- "Comet Wine" (Ray Russell)
- "The Red Euphoric Bands" (Philip Latham)
- "Throwback" (Sydney J. Bounds)
- "Kindergarten" (James E. Gunn)
- "West Wind, Falling" (Gregory Benford and Gordon Eklund)
- "The Comet, the Cairn and the Capsule" (Duncan Lunan)
- "Some Joys Under the Star" (Frederik Pohl)
- "Future Forbidden" (Philip Latham)
- "The Death of Princes" (Fritz Leiber)
- "The Funhouse Effect" (John Varley)
- "The Family Man" (Theodore L. Thomas)
- "Double Planet" (Dr. John Gribbin)
- "Pride" (Poul Anderson)
