= Marty Ross (writer) =

Scottish writer

Marty Ross is a Scottish writer, best known for his audio dramas for the British Broadcasting Corporation, Big Finish Productions and for the Wireless Theatre Company and 3Dhorrorfi. He is author of the 'Tartan Noir' thriller novel Aztec Love Song. He has had several plays performed on stage, mostly with an emphasis on Gothic horror and the surreal. He has dramatized stories by other Scottish writers such as James Hogg, Robert Louis Stevenson, and Sir Arthur Conan Doyle in his radio series The Darker Side of the Border. Among his influences are the work of Hammer Films and British science fiction dramatist Nigel Kneale.

== Work ==
=== Audio dramas ===
- 2002: A Hundred Miles (BBC Radio 4) – a play set in modern Russia
- 2003: The Darker Side of the Border (BBC Radio 4), three plays dramatizing Scottish horror stories: "The Captain of the Polestar" by Sir Arthur Conan Doyle, "Olalla" by Robert Louis Stevenson and "The Brownie of the Black Haggs" by James Hogg
- 2004: Ghost Zone (BBC Radio 7) – a five-part science fiction serial about a Highland village that appears to have survived a meteor strike, and is now surrounded by devastation and a radioactive cloud.
- 2005: A Breath from Other Planets (BBC Radio 4) – A biographical drama about expressionist composer Arnold Schoenberg
- 2007: My Blue Piano (BBC Radio 4) – Dramatising the life of expressionist poet Else Lasker-Schuler
- 2007: Catch my Breath (BBC Radio 7) – 5 part gothic horror serial based on Celtic mythology
- 2009: Medusa on the Beach (Wireless Theatre Company) – Black comedy about a woman who finds the head of the gorgon Medusa from Greek mythology on the beach of a British seaside town
- 2010: Doctor Who: The Companion Chronicles – "Night's Black Agents" (Big Finish Productions) Adventure set in 18th century Scotland, pitting Doctor Who and companion Jamie McCrimmon against figures from Scottish romantic literature
- 2010: Blood and Stone (3Dhorrorfi) – Horror drama based on the true story of Elizabeth Báthory, the notorious Hungarian 'vampire countess'
- 2010: Doctor Who: "Lurkers at Sunlight's Edge" (Big Finish Productions) – Adventure for Seventh Doctor and companions, influenced by work of H.P. Lovecraft
- 2012: Dark Shadows: "Dress Me in Dark Dreams" (Big Finish Productions) – A spin-off from the cult TV series Dark Shadows, starring Amber Benson and Terry Crawford.
- 2012: Rough Magick (BBC Radio 4) – Historical comedy drama set in 1605, featuring King James I and William "Shaxberd" (Shakespeare)
- 2016: "Romeo and Jude" (Audible) – A gay retelling of Romeo and Juliet by William Shakespeare, starring Matthew Tennyson as Jude, Owen Teale as Ray, Nick Moran as Jude's father Charlie and Ricky Norwood as Tyrone.
- 2018: “Arabian Nights” (Audible) – An adaptation of three stories from One Thousand and One Nights starring Omid Djalili, Mandana Jones, and a full cast.
- 2018: “The Darkwater Bride” (Audible) – Supernatural mystery thriller set in Victorian London, starring Freya Mavor, Adrian Scarborough, and a full cast.
- 2019: "The Three Musketeers" (Audible) - An adaption of The Three Musketeers, with the addition of a unequal gay relationship between the Duke of Buckingham and King James VI and I

=== Novels ===
- 2009: Aztec Love Song (Weathervane Press ISBN 978-0-9562193-2-9). Psychological thriller set in Newton Mearns, Renfrewshire, near Glasgow, where Ross grew up
