= Monsters (anthology) =

1988 science fiction anthology

- Cover of first edition
- Editors: Isaac Asimov; Martin H. Greenberg; Charles G. Waugh
- Cover artist: J. K. Potter
- Language: English
- Series: Isaac Asimov's Wonderful Worlds of Science Fiction
- Genre: Science fiction
- Publisher: Signet/New American Library
- Publication date: 1988
- Publication place: United States
- Media type: Print (paperback)
- Pages: 349
- ISBN: 0-451-15411-8
- Preceded by: Space Shuttles
- Followed by: Robots

Monsters is an anthology of science fiction short stories edited by Isaac Asimov, Martin H. Greenberg and Charles G. Waugh as the eighth volume in their Isaac Asimov's Wonderful Worlds of Science Fiction series. It was first published in paperback by Signet/New American Library in July 1988. The first British edition was issued in paperback by Robinson in July 1989.

The book collects eleven novellas, novelettes and short stories by various science fiction authors, together with an introduction by Asimov.

== Contents ==
- "Introduction: Monsters" (Isaac Asimov)
- "Passengers" (Robert Silverberg)
- "The Botticelli Horror" (Lloyd Biggle, Jr.)
- "The Shapes" (J. H. Rosny aîné)
- "The Clone" (Theodore L. Thomas)
- "The Men in the Walls" (William Tenn)
- "The Doors of His Face, the Lamps of His Mouth" (Roger Zelazny)
- "Student Body" (Floyd L. Wallace)
- "Black Destroyer" (A. E. van Vogt)
- "Mother" (Philip José Farmer)
- "Exploration Team" (Murray Leinster)
- "All the Way Back" (Michael Shaara)
