= The Gnarly Man =

- Short story by L. Sprague de Camp
- Edd Cartier's illustration of the story in Unknown, June, 1939
- Country: United States
- Language: English
- Genre: Science fiction

Publication
- Published in: Unknown
- Publisher: Street & Smith
- Media type: Print (Magazine)
- Publication date: June, 1939

"The Gnarly Man" is a science fiction story by American writer L. Sprague de Camp, about an apparently immortal Neanderthal Man surviving into the present day.

== Publication history ==
The story was first published in the magazine Unknown for June, 1939 and first appeared in book form in de Camp's collection The Wheels of If and Other Science Fiction (Shasta, 1948). It later appeared in the subsequent de Camp collections The Best of L. Sprague de Camp (Doubleday, 1978), Aristotle and the Gun and Other Stories (Five Star, 2002), and Years in the Making: the Time-Travel Stories of L. Sprague de Camp (NESFA Press, 2005).

The story has also appeared in the magazines Fantastic Story Magazine for July, 1953 and Jim Baen's Universe for April, 2007, and the anthologies Human? (Lion Books, 1954), The Unknown (Pyramid Books, 1963), The Freak Show (Rapp & Whiting, 1970), The Great Science Fiction Stories Volume 1, 1939 (DAW Books, 1979), Dawn of Time (Elsevier/Nelson Books, 1979), Isaac Asimov Presents The Golden Years of Science Fiction (Bonanza Books, 1983), Neanderthals (Signet/NEL, 1987), Unknown Worlds: Tales from Beyond (Galahad Books, 1988), Modern Classics of Fantasy (St. Martin's Press, 1997), and My Favorite Fantasy Story (DAW Books, 2000). The story has been translated into Dutch, French, German and Italian.

== Plot summary ==
Visiting a freak show, scientist Dr. Matilda Sandler takes an interest in the ape-man "Ungo-Bungo", who appears to exhibit genuine atavistic features. After the show she goes backstage and meets the man behind the role to ask if he will agree to be examined for scientific purposes. Ungo-Bungo, who calls himself Clarence Aloysius Gaffney, proves affable but reticent about his past and reluctant to submit to examination. In time, however, he warily consents in return for surgery to correct some old injuries.

Eventually it comes out that Gaffney is actually Shining Hawk, a Neanderthal Man over 50,000 years old, whose aging process was frozen early in life when he was struck by lightning. He had survived by his wits on the periphery of human society since the extinction of his own kind, using a succession of false identities and getting by as a blacksmith or in menial professions like his present one. He has been a witness to much of history from the margins, making little personal impact on it—though it is suggested that he may have been the original basis for the tales of the divine lame blacksmith Vulcan (his leg injury is very old).

As it happens, however, Gaffney's caution proves well-founded; not only does Sandler develop an unwelcome crush on him, but the revelation of his secret brings out the worst in some of the scientists to whom it is confided. Discovering that the surgeon who is to perform his operation secretly intends to dissect him, Gaffney skips out. Later, from an undisclosed location, he sends his apologies and regrets to those who have befriended and aided him.

== Reception ==
According to Sam Moskowitz, the story "broke ground for an entirely new approach on the treatment of such material," which was "most notably emulated by Philip José Farmer in 'The Alley Man'."

Don D'Ammassa wrote "[t]he forthrightly sentimental "The Gnarly Man" is one of the most moving portraits ever to appear in the [science fiction] field."

More recently, Robert Wilfred Franson called the work "a good specimen of the distinct category of stories about Neanderthal Man in science fiction (or fantasy if you prefer)." He notes it "is a humorous story, but it may make you think even while you're enjoying it," and observes that "[d]e Camp obviously has fun here thinking through the likely practical concerns of someone living so long." He rates "[t]he character of Clarence [as] very well sketched in the space of a novelet," going on to say "[h]e brings to my mind a comparison with the title character, a speaking gorilla, in Daniel Quinn's novel Ishmael. The advantage is all Clarence's, as he is a man; whereas poor Ishmael is an ideological mouthpiece."

== Relation to other works ==
De Camp wrote that he got the subject for the story from his friend P. Schuyler Miller, who was also writing a story about a Neanderthal man in modern times. The Miller piece, "Old Man Mulligan," appeared in the December, 1940 issue of Astounding Science-Fiction. De Camp noted that the two stories were completely different and used the incident to illustrate the principle that two science fiction writers, using the same idea, will write different stories, so there is nothing wrong with copying someone else's idea.

De Camp also featured Neanderthals in his later fantasy novel The Pixilated Peeress (1991). In the parallel world of that novel the species forms a relict population pushed by humanity into the higher elevations of the Alps. The fugitive hero Thorolf Zigramson takes refuge among a tribe of these "trolls," as they are known, and is adopted into their society and aided by them.

== Importance ==
"The Gnarly Man" is one of de Camp's most notable works. The story's popularity has been demonstrated by frequent reprinting and anthologization.
