= Modern Classics of Fantasy =

- Cover of first edition
- Author: Edited by Gardner Dozois
- Cover artist: James Gurney
- Language: English
- Genre: Fantasy
- Publisher: St. Martin's Press
- Publication date: 1997
- Publication place: United States
- Media type: Print (hardcover)
- Pages: xxiii, 647 pp.
- ISBN: 0-312-15173-X

Modern Classics of Fantasy is an anthology of fantasy short works edited by American writer Gardner Dozois. It was first published in hardcover by St. Martin's Griffin in January 1997, which also issued a trade paperback edition in November of the same year and an ebook edition in October 2014. A Science Fiction Book Club edition appeared in March 1997.

== Summary ==
The book collects thirty-two novellas, novelettes and short stories by various fantasy authors originally published from the mid 1930s through the mid 1990s, together with a preface and bibliography of recommended reading by the editor.

== Contents ==
- "Preface" (Gardner Dozois)
- "Trouble with Water" (H. L. Gold)
- "The Gnarly Man" (L. Sprague de Camp)
- "The Golem" (Avram Davidson)
- "Walk Like a Mountain" (Manly Wade Wellman)
- "Extempore" (Damon Knight)
- "Space-Time for Springers" (Fritz Leiber)
- "Scylla's Daughter" (Fritz Leiber)
- "The Overworld" (Jack Vance)
- "The Signaller" (Keith Roberts)
- "The Manor of Roses" (Thomas Burnett Swann)
- "Death and the Executioner" (Roger Zelazny)
- "Configuration of the North Shore" (R. A. Lafferty)
- "Two Sadnesses" (George Alec Effinger)
- "The Tale of Hauk" (Poul Anderson)
- "Manatee Gal, Won't You Come Out Tonight" (Avram Davidson)
- "The Troll" (T. H. White)
- "The Sleep of Trees" (Jane Yolen)
- "God's Hooks!" (Howard Waldrop)
- "The Man Who Painted the Dragon Griaule" (Lucius Shepard)
- "A Cabin on the Coast" (Gene Wolfe)
- "Paper Dragons" (James P. Blaylock)
- "Into Gold" (Tanith Lee)
- "Flowers of Edo" (Bruce Sterling)
- "Buffalo Gals, Won't You Come Out Tonight" (Ursula K. Le Guin)
- "A Gift of the People" (Robert Sampson)
- "Missolonghi 1824" (John Crowley)
- "Bears Discover Fire" (Terry Bisson)
- "Blunderbore" (Esther M. Friesner)
- "Death and the Lady" (Judith Tarr)
- "The Changeling's Tale" (Michael Swanwick)
- "Professor Gottesman and the Indian Rhinoceros" (Peter S. Beagle)
- "Beauty and the Opéra or The Phanton Beast" (Suzy McKee Charnas)
- "Recommended Reading" (Gardner Dozois)
