= Spring-heeled Jack =

English legendary folklore character

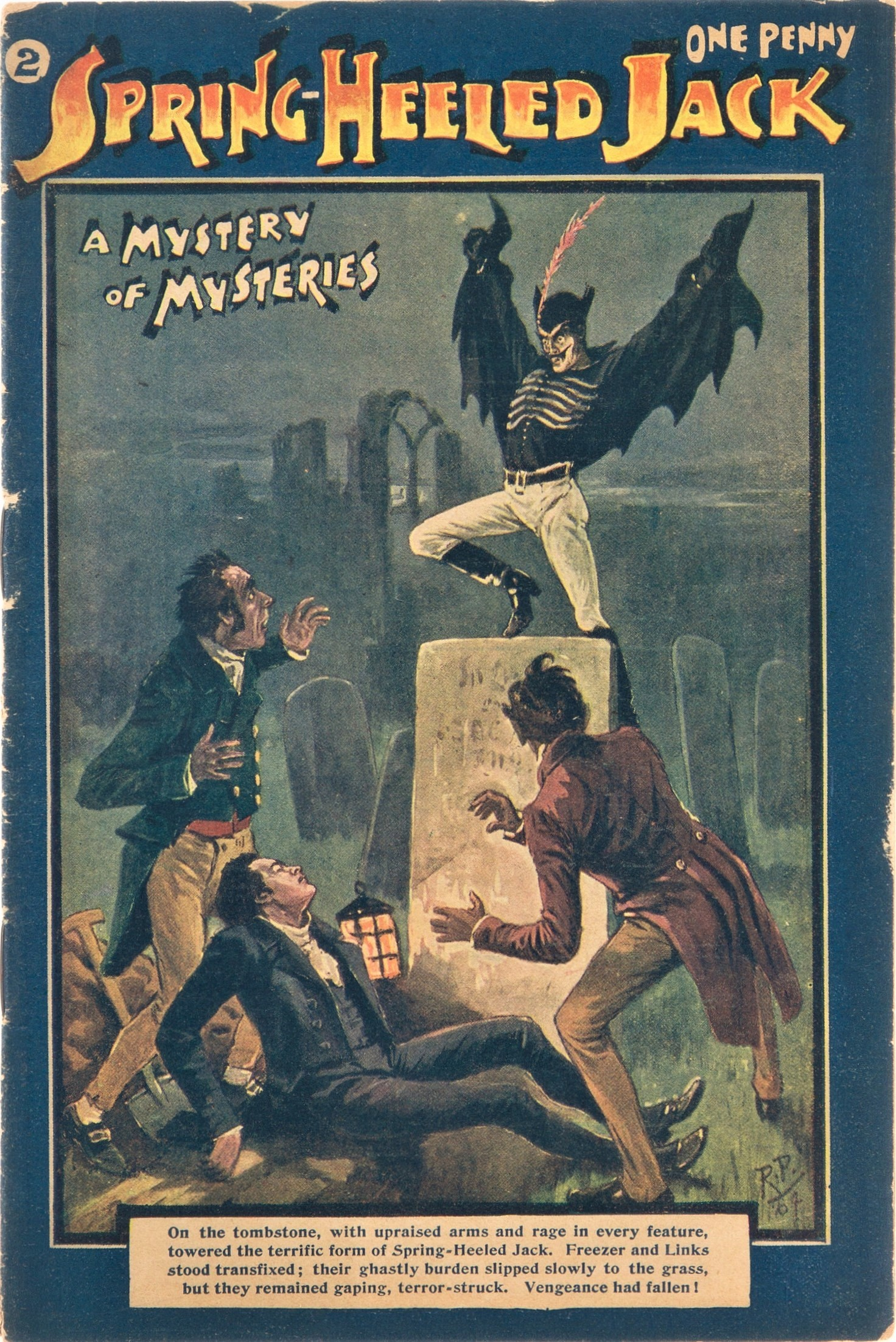
- Spring-heeled Jack as depicted in the English penny dreadful Spring-Heeled Jack #2, Aldine Publishing, 1904

Creature information
- Grouping: Hoax, mass hysteria, demon, phantom

Origin
- Country: United Kingdom
- Region: London; Liverpool

Spring-heeled Jack was an entity in English folklore of the Victorian era. The first claimed sighting of Spring-heeled Jack was in 1837. Later sightings were reported all over the United Kingdom and were especially prevalent in suburban London, the Midlands and Scotland.

There are many theories about the nature and identity of Spring-heeled Jack. This urban myth was very popular in its time, due to the tales of his bizarre appearance and ability to make extraordinary leaps, to the point that he became the topic of several works of fiction.

Spring-heeled Jack was described by people who claimed to have seen him as having a terrifying and frightful appearance, with diabolical physiognomy, clawed hands, and eyes that "resembled red balls of fire". One report claimed that, beneath a black cloak, he wore a helmet and a tight-fitting white garment like an oilskin. Many stories also mention a "devil-like" aspect. Others said he was tall and thin, with the appearance of a gentleman. Several reports mention that he could breathe out blue and white flames and that he wore sharp metallic claws at his fingertips. At least two people claimed that he was able to speak comprehensible English.

== History ==
=== Precedents ===
In the early 19th century, there were reports of ghosts that stalked the streets of London. These human-like figures were described as pale; it was believed that they stalked and preyed on lone pedestrians. The stories told of these figures formed part of a distinct ghost tradition in London which, some writers have argued, formed the foundation of the later legend of Spring-heeled Jack.

The most important of these early entities was the Hammersmith Ghost, which in 1803 and 1804 was reported in Hammersmith on the western fringes of London; it would later reappear in 1824. Another apparition, the Southampton ghost, was also reported as assaulting individuals in the night. This particular spirit bore many of the characteristics of Spring-heeled Jack, and was reported as jumping over houses and being over 10 ft (3.0 m) tall.

=== Early reports ===
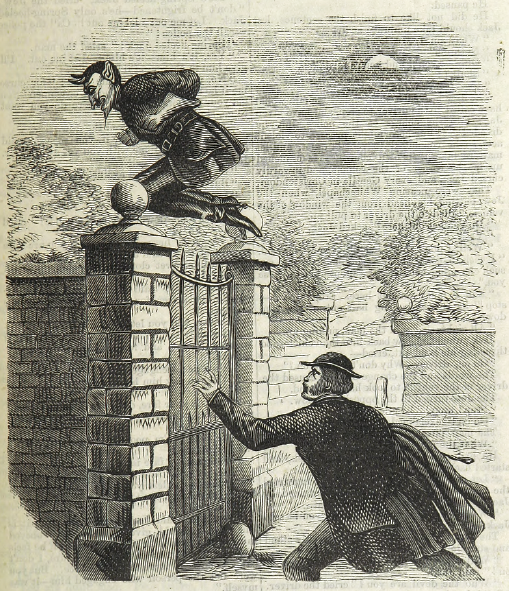
Illustration of Spring-heeled Jack, from the serial Spring-heel'd Jack: The Terror of London

The first alleged sightings of Spring-heeled Jack were made in London in 1837 and the last reported sighting is said to have been made in Liverpool in 1904.

According to much later accounts, in October 1837 a girl named Mary Stevens was walking to Lavender Hill, where she was working as a servant, after visiting her parents in Battersea. On her way through Clapham Common, a strange figure leapt at her from a dark alley. After immobilising her with a tight grip of his arms, he began to kiss her face, while ripping her clothes and touching her flesh with his claws, which were, according to her deposition, "cold and clammy as those of a corpse". In panic, the girl screamed, making the attacker quickly flee from the scene. The commotion brought several residents who immediately launched a search for the aggressor, but he could not be found.

The next day, the leaping character is said to have accosted another victim near Mary Stevens' home, inaugurating a method that would reappear in later reports: he jumped in the way of a passing carriage, causing the coachman to lose control, crash, and severely injure himself. Several witnesses claimed that he escaped by jumping over a 9 ft (2.7 m) high wall while cackling with a high-pitched, ringing laughter.

Gradually, the news of the strange character spread; soon, the press and the public gave him the name "Spring-heeled Jack".

=== Official recognition ===
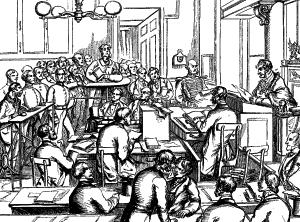
A public session at the Mansion House, London (c. 1840)

A few months after these first sightings, on 9 January 1838, the Lord Mayor of London, Sir John Cowan, revealed at a public session held in the Mansion House an anonymous complaint that he had received several days earlier, which he had withheld in the hope of obtaining further information. The correspondent, who signed the letter "a resident of Peckham", wrote:

It appears that some individuals (of, as the writer believes, the highest ranks of life) have laid a wager with a mischievous and foolhardy companion, that he durst not take upon himself the task of visiting many of the villages near London in three different disguises—a ghost, a bear, and a devil; and moreover, that he will not enter a gentleman's gardens for the purpose of alarming the inmates of the house. The wager has, however, been accepted, and the unmanly villain has succeeded in depriving seven ladies of their senses, two of whom are not likely to recover, but to become burdens to their families.

At one house the man rang the bell, and on the servant coming to open door, this worse than brute stood in no less dreadful figure than a spectre clad most perfectly. The consequence was that the poor girl immediately swooned, and has never from that moment been in her senses.

The affair has now been going on for some time, and, strange to say, the papers are still silent on the subject. The writer has reason to believe that they have the whole history at their finger-ends but, through interested motives, are induced to remain silent.

Though the Lord Mayor seemed fairly sceptical, a member of the audience confirmed that "servant girls about Kensington, Hammersmith and Ealing, tell dreadful stories of this ghost or devil". The matter was reported in The Times on 9 January, other national papers on 10 January and, on the day after that, the Lord Mayor showed a crowded gathering a pile of letters from various places in and around London complaining of similar "wicked pranks". The quantity of letters that poured into the Mansion House suggests that the stories were widespread in suburban London. One writer said several young women in Hammersmith had been frightened into "dangerous fits" and some "severely wounded by a sort of claws the miscreant wore on his hands". Another correspondent claimed that in Stockwell, Brixton, Camberwell and Vauxhall several people had died of fright and others had had fits; meanwhile, another reported that the trickster had been repeatedly seen in Lewisham and Blackheath.

The Lord Mayor himself was in two minds about the affair: he thought "the greatest exaggerations" had been made, and that it was quite impossible "that the ghost performs the feats of a devil upon earth", but on the other hand someone he trusted had told him of a servant girl at Forest Hill who had been scared into fits by a figure in a bear's skin; he was confident the person or persons involved in this "pantomime display" would be caught and punished. The police were instructed to search for the individual responsible, and rewards were offered.

A peculiar report from The Brighton Gazette, which appeared in the 14 April 1838 edition of The Times, related how a gardener in Rosehill, Sussex, had been terrified by a creature of unknown nature. The Times wrote that "Spring-heeled Jack has, it seems, found his way to the Sussex coast", even though the report bore little resemblance to other accounts of Jack. The incident occurred on 13 April, when it appeared to a gardener "in the shape of a bear or some other four-footed animal". Having attracted the gardener's attention by a growl, it then climbed the garden wall and ran along it on all fours, before jumping down and chasing the gardener for some time. After terrifying the gardener, the apparition scaled the wall and made its exit.

=== Scales and Alsop reports ===
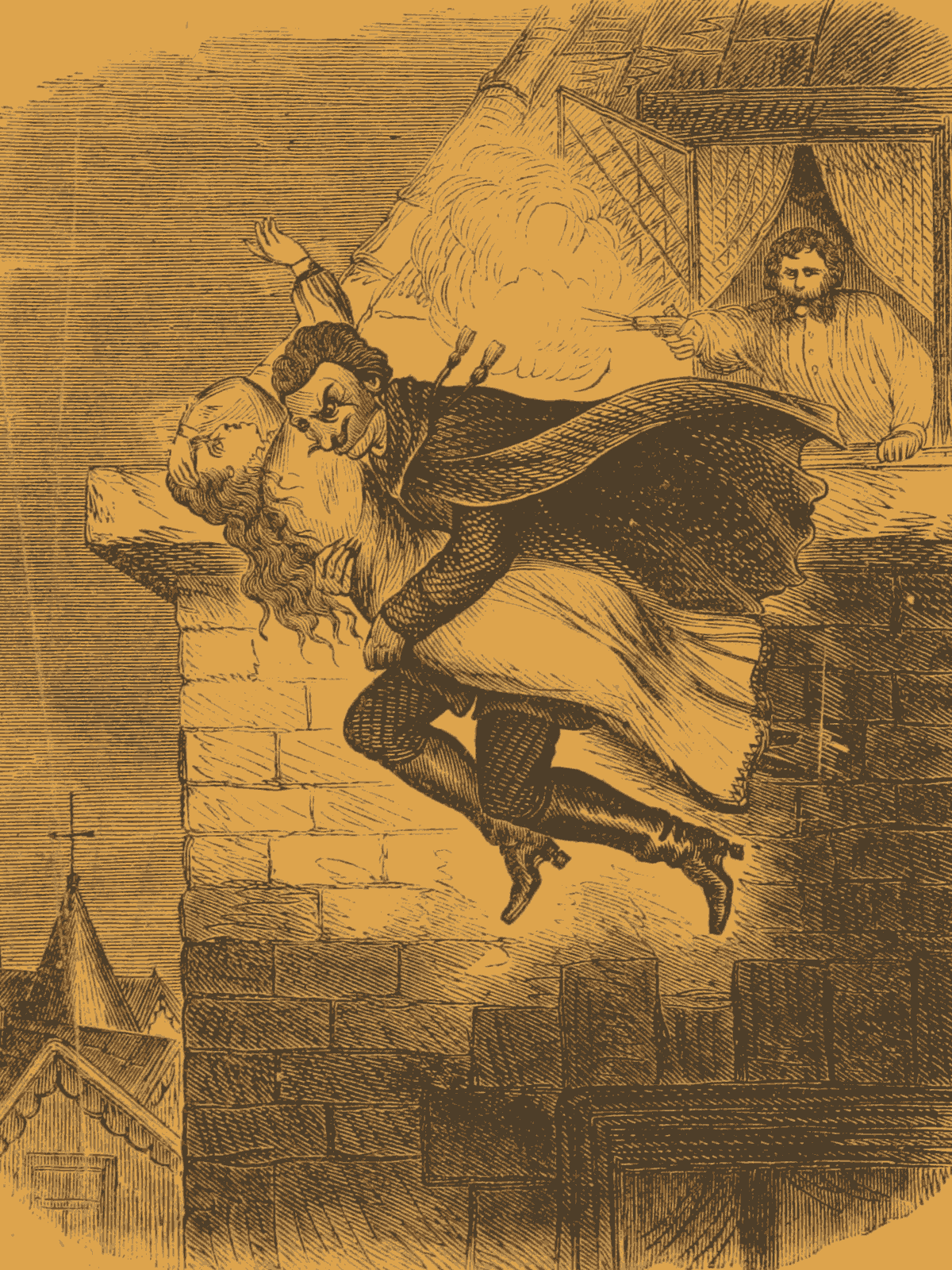
Illustration of Spring-heeled Jack, from the 1867 serial Spring-heel'd Jack: The Terror of London

Perhaps the best known of the alleged incidents involving Spring-heeled Jack were the attacks on two teenage girls, Lucy Scales and Jane Alsop. The Alsop report was widely covered by the newspapers, including a piece in The Times, while fewer reports appeared in relation to the attack on Scales. The press coverage of these two attacks helped to raise the profile of Spring-heeled Jack.

==== Alsop case ====
Jane Alsop reported that on the night of 19 February 1838, she answered the door of her father's house to a man claiming to be a police officer, who told her to bring a light, claiming "we have caught Spring-heeled Jack here in the lane". She brought the person a candle, and noticed that he wore a large cloak. The moment she had handed him the candle, however, he threw off the cloak and "presented a most hideous and frightful appearance", vomiting blue and white flame from his mouth while his eyes resembled "red balls of fire". Miss Alsop reported that he wore a large helmet and that his clothing, which appeared to be very tight-fitting, resembled white oilskin. Without saying a word he caught hold of her and began tearing her gown with his claws which she was certain were "of some metallic substance". She screamed for help, and managed to get away from him and ran towards the house. He caught her on the steps and tore her neck and arms with his claws. She was rescued by one of her sisters, after which her assailant fled.

==== Scales case ====
On 28 February 1838, nine days after the attack on Miss Alsop, 18-year-old Lucy Scales and her sister were returning home after visiting their brother, a butcher who lived in a respectable part of Limehouse. Miss Scales stated in her deposition to the police that as she and her sister were passing along Green Dragon Alley, they observed a person standing in an angle of the passage. She was walking in front of her sister at the time, and just as she came up to the person, who was wearing a large cloak, he spurted "a quantity of blue flame" in her face, which deprived her of her sight, and so alarmed her, that she instantly dropped to the ground, and was seized with violent fits which continued for several hours.

Her brother added that on the evening in question, he had heard the loud screams of one of his sisters moments after they had left his house and on running up Green Dragon Alley he found his sister Lucy on the ground in a fit, with her sister attempting to hold and support her. She was taken home, and he then learned from his other sister what had happened. She described Lucy's assailant as being of tall, thin, and gentlemanly appearance, covered in a large cloak, and carrying a small lamp or bull's eye lantern similar to those used by the police. The individual did not speak nor did he try to lay hands on them, but instead walked quickly away. Every effort was made by the police to discover the author of these and similar outrages, and several persons were questioned, but were set free.

=== Popularisation ===
The Times reported the alleged attack on Jane Alsop on 2 March 1838 under the heading "The Late Outrage at Old Ford". This was followed with an account of the trial of one Thomas Millbank, who, immediately after the reported attack on Jane Alsop, had boasted in the Morgan's Arms that he was Spring-heeled Jack. He was arrested and tried at Lambeth Street court. The arresting officer was James Lea, who had earlier arrested William Corder, the Red Barn Murderer. Millbank had been wearing white overalls and a greatcoat, which he dropped outside the house, and the candle he dropped was also found. He escaped conviction only because Jane Alsop insisted her attacker had breathed fire, and Millbank admitted he could do no such thing. Most of the other accounts were written long after the date; contemporary newspapers do not mention them.

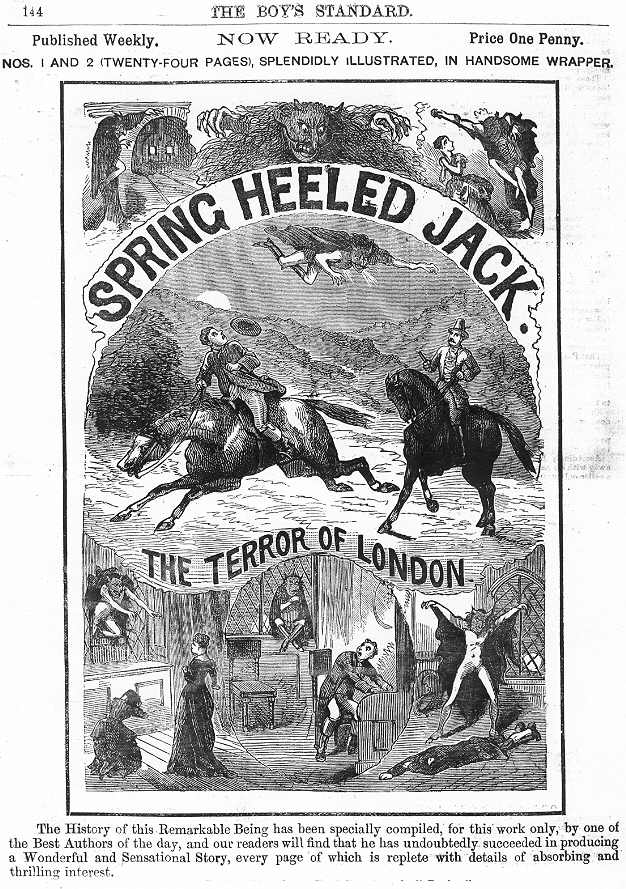
Ad for Spring Heeled Jack, a penny dreadful (1886)

After these incidents, Spring-heeled Jack became one of the most popular characters of the period. His alleged exploits were reported in the newspapers and became the subject of several penny dreadfuls and plays performed in the cheap theatres that abounded at the time. The devil was even renamed "Spring-heeled Jack" in some Punch and Judy shows, as recounted by Henry Mayhew in his London Labour and the London Poor:

This here is Satan, – we might say the devil, but that ain't right, and gennelfolks don't like such words. He is now commonly called 'Spring-heeled Jack;' or the 'Rossian Bear,' – that's since the war.

— Henry Mayhew, London Labour and the London Poor, p. 52

But, even as his fame was growing, reports of Spring-heeled Jack's appearances became less frequent if more widespread. In 1843, however, a wave of sightings swept the country again. A report from Northamptonshire described him as "the very image of the Devil himself, with horns and eyes of flame", and in East Anglia reports of attacks on drivers of mail coaches became common. In July 1847 "a Spring-heeled Jack investigation" in Teignmouth, Devon led to a Captain Finch being convicted of two charges of assault against women during which he is said to have been "disguised in a skin coat, which had the appearance of bullock's hide, skullcap, horns and mask". The legend was linked with the phenomenon of the "Devil's Footprints" which appeared in Devon in February 1855.

=== Last reports ===
In the beginning of the 1870s, Spring-heeled Jack was reported again in several places distant from each other. In November 1872, the News of the World reported that Peckham was "in a state of commotion owing to what is known as the 'Peckham Ghost', a mysterious figure, quite alarming in appearance". The editorial pointed out that it was none other than "Spring-heeled Jack, who terrified a past generation". Similar stories were published in The Illustrated Police News. In April and May 1873, it reported there were numerous sightings in Sheffield of the "Park Ghost", which locals also came to identify as Spring-heeled Jack.

==== Aldershot ====
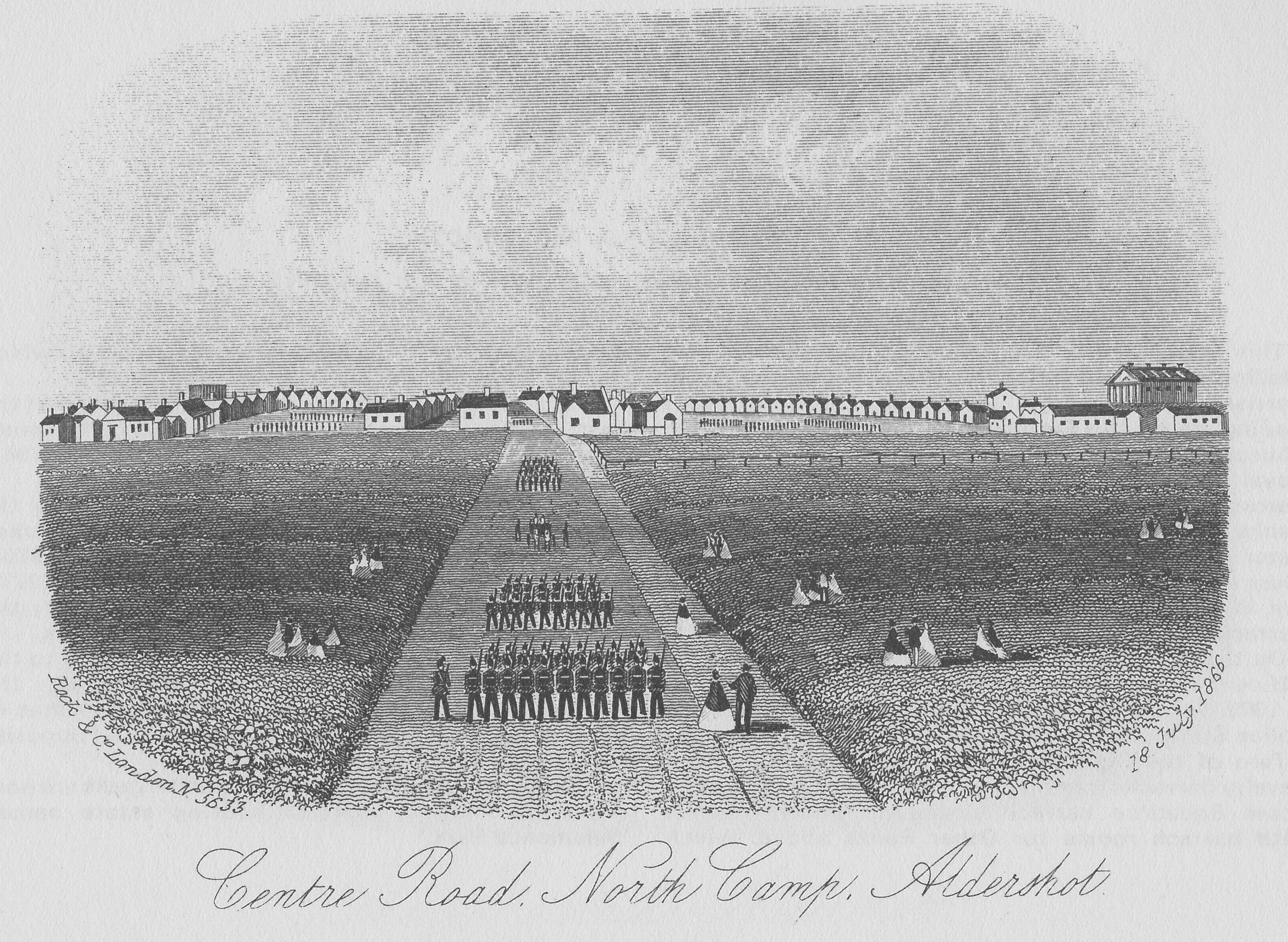
North Camp in Aldershot as it looked in 1866

This news was followed by more reported sightings, until in August 1877 one of the most notable reports about Spring-heeled Jack came from a group of soldiers in Aldershot Garrison. This story went as follows: a sentry on duty at the North Camp peered into the darkness, his attention attracted by a peculiar figure "advancing towards him." The soldier issued a challenge, which went unheeded, and the figure came up beside him and delivered several slaps to his face. A guard shot at him, with no visible effect; some sources claim that the soldier may have fired blanks at him, others that he missed or fired warning shots. The strange figure then disappeared into the surrounding darkness "with astonishing bounds."

Lord Ernest Hamilton's 1922 memoir Forty Years On mentions the Aldershot appearances of Spring-heeled Jack; however, he (apparently erroneously) says that they occurred in the winter of 1879 after his regiment, the 60th Rifles, had moved to Aldershot, and that similar appearances had occurred when the regiment was barracked at Colchester in the winter of 1878. He adds that the panic became so great at Aldershot that sentries were issued ammunition and ordered to shoot "the night terror" on sight, following which the appearances ceased. Hamilton thought that the appearances were actually pranks, carried out by one of his fellow officers, a Lieutenant Alfrey. However, there is no record of Alfrey ever being court-martialled for the offence.

==== Lincolnshire ====
In the autumn of 1877, Spring-heeled Jack was reportedly seen at Newport Arch, in Lincoln, Lincolnshire, wearing a sheep skin. An angry mob supposedly chased him and cornered him, and just as in Aldershot a while before, residents fired at him to no effect. As usual, he was said to have made use of his leaping abilities to lose the crowd and disappear once again.

==== Liverpool ====
By the end of the 19th century the reported sightings of Spring-heeled Jack were moving towards the north west of England. Around 1888, in Everton, north Liverpool, he allegedly appeared on the rooftop of Saint Francis Xavier's Church in Salisbury Street. In 1904 there were reports of appearances in nearby William Henry Street.

=== Aftermath and impact upon Victorian popular culture ===
The vast urban legend built around Spring-heeled Jack influenced many aspects of Victorian life, especially in contemporary popular culture. For decades, especially in London, his name was equated with the bogeyman, as a means of scaring children into behaving by telling them if they were not good, Spring-heeled Jack would leap up and peer in at them through their bedroom windows, by night.

However, it was in fictional entertainment where the legend of Spring-heeled Jack exerted the most extensive influence, owing to his allegedly extraordinary nature. Three pamphlet publications, purportedly based on the real events, appeared almost immediately, during January and February, 1838. They were not advertised as fiction, though they likely were at least partly so. The only known copies were reported to have perished when the British Library was hit during The Blitz, but their catalogue still lists the first one.

The character was written into a number of penny dreadful stories during the latter half of the 19th century, initially as a villain and then in increasingly heroic roles. By the early 1900s he was being represented as a costumed, altruistic avenger of wrongs and protector of the innocent, effectively becoming a precursor to pulp fiction and then comic book superheroes.

== Theories ==
No one was ever caught and identified as Spring-heeled Jack; combined with the extraordinary abilities attributed to him and the very long period during which he was reportedly at large, this has led to numerous and varied theories of his nature and identity. While several researchers seek a normal explanation for the events, other authors explore the more fantastic details of the story to propose different kinds of paranormal speculation.

=== Sceptical positions ===
Sceptical investigators have dismissed the stories of Spring-heeled Jack as mass hysteria which developed around various stories of a bogeyman or devil which have been around for centuries, or from exaggerated urban myths about a man who clambered over rooftops claiming that the Devil was chasing him.

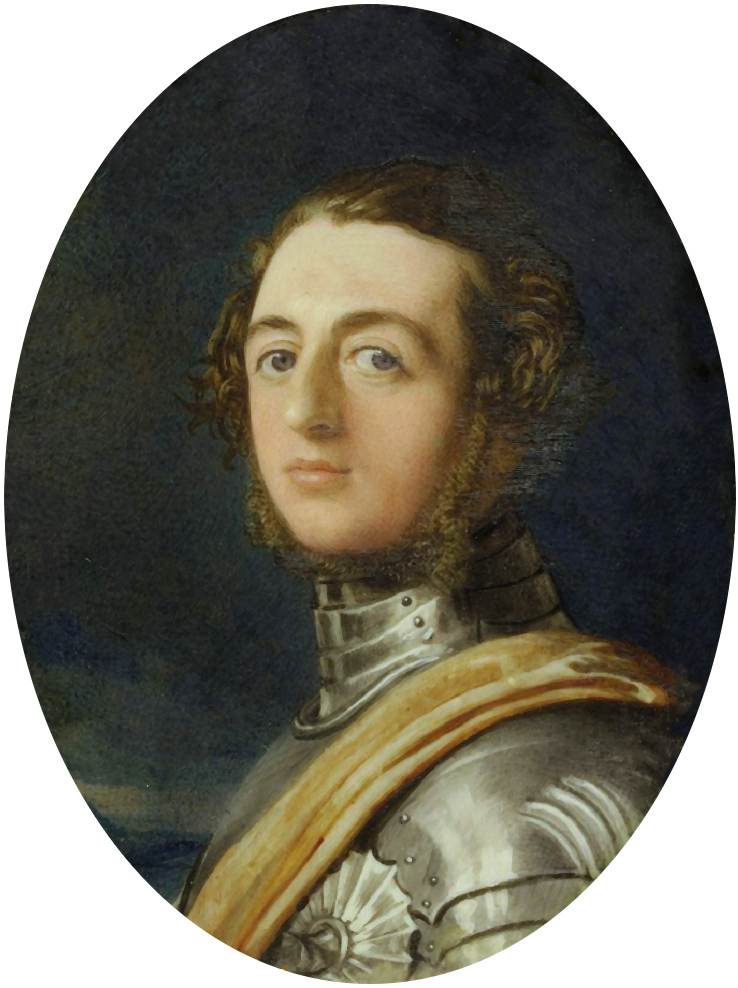
Henry de La Poer Beresford, 3rd Marquess of Waterford (1840)

Other researchers believe that some individual(s) may have been behind its origins, being followed by imitators later on. Spring-heeled Jack was widely considered not to be a supernatural creature, but rather one or more persons with a macabre sense of humour. This idea matches the contents of the letter to the Lord Mayor, which accused a group of young aristocrats as the culprits, after an irresponsible wager. A popular rumour circulating as early as 1840 pointed to an Irish nobleman, the Marquess of Waterford, as the main suspect. Haining suggested this may have been due to his having had bad experiences with women and police officers.

The Marquess was frequently in the news in the late 1830s for drunken brawling, brutal jokes and vandalism, and was said to do anything for a bet; his irregular behaviour and his contempt for women earned him the title "the Mad Marquis", and it is also known that he was in the London area by the time the first incidents took place. In 1880 he was named as the perpetrator by E. Cobham Brewer, who said that the Marquess "used to amuse himself by springing on travellers unawares, to frighten them, and from time to time others have followed his silly example." In 1842, the Marquess married and settled in Curraghmore House, County Waterford, and reportedly led an exemplary life until he died in a riding accident in 1859.

Sceptical investigators have asserted that the story of Spring-heeled Jack was exaggerated and altered through mass hysteria, a process in which many sociological issues may have contributed. These include unsupported rumours, superstition, oral tradition, sensationalist publications, and a folklore rich in tales of fairies and strange roguish creatures. Gossip of alleged leaping and fire-spitting powers, his alleged extraordinary features and his reputed skill in evading apprehension captured the mind of the superstitious public—increasingly so with the passing of time, which gave the impression that Spring-heeled Jack had suffered no ill effects from age. As a result, a whole urban legend was built around the character, being reflected by contemporary publications, which in turn fuelled this popular perception.

=== Paranormal conjectures ===
A variety of speculative paranormal explanations have been proposed to explain the origin of Spring-heeled Jack, including that he was an extraterrestrial entity with a non-human appearance and features (e.g., retro-reflective red eyes, or phosphorus breath) and a superhuman agility deriving from life on a high-gravity world, with his jumping ability and strange behaviour, and that he was a demon, accidentally or purposefully summoned into this world by practitioners of the occult, or who made himself manifest simply to create spiritual turmoil.

Fortean authors, particularly Loren Coleman and Jerome Clark, list "Spring-heeled Jack" in a category named "phantom attackers", with another well-known example being the "Mad Gasser of Mattoon". Typical "phantom attackers" appear to be human, and may be perceived as prosaic criminals, but may display extraordinary abilities (as in Spring-heeled Jack's jumps, which, it is widely noted, would break the ankles of a human who replicated them) or otherwise cannot be caught by authorities. Victims commonly experience the "attack" in their bedrooms, homes or other seemingly secure enclosures. They may report being pinned or paralysed, or on the other hand describe a "siege" in which they fought off a persistent intruder or intruders. Many reports can readily be explained psychologically, most notably as the "Old Hag" phenomenon, recorded in folklore and recognised by psychologists as a form of hallucination. In the most problematic cases, an "attack" is witnessed by several people and substantiated by some physical evidence, but the attacker cannot be verified to exist.

== Counterpart in Prague ==
A similar figure known as Pérák, the Spring Man of Prague was reported to have been seen in Czechoslovakia around 1939–1945. As writers such as Mike Dash have shown, the elusiveness and supernatural leaping abilities attributed to Pérák bear a close resemblance to those exhibited by Spring-heeled Jack, and distinct parallels can be drawn between the two entities. The stories of Pérák provide a useful example of how the traits of Spring-heeled Jack have a broad cultural resonance in urban folklore. Pérák, like Spring-heeled Jack, went on to become a folklore hero, even starring in several animated superhero cartoons, fighting the SS, the earliest of which is Jiří Trnka's 1946 film Pérák a SS or Springman and the SS.

== In contemporary popular culture ==
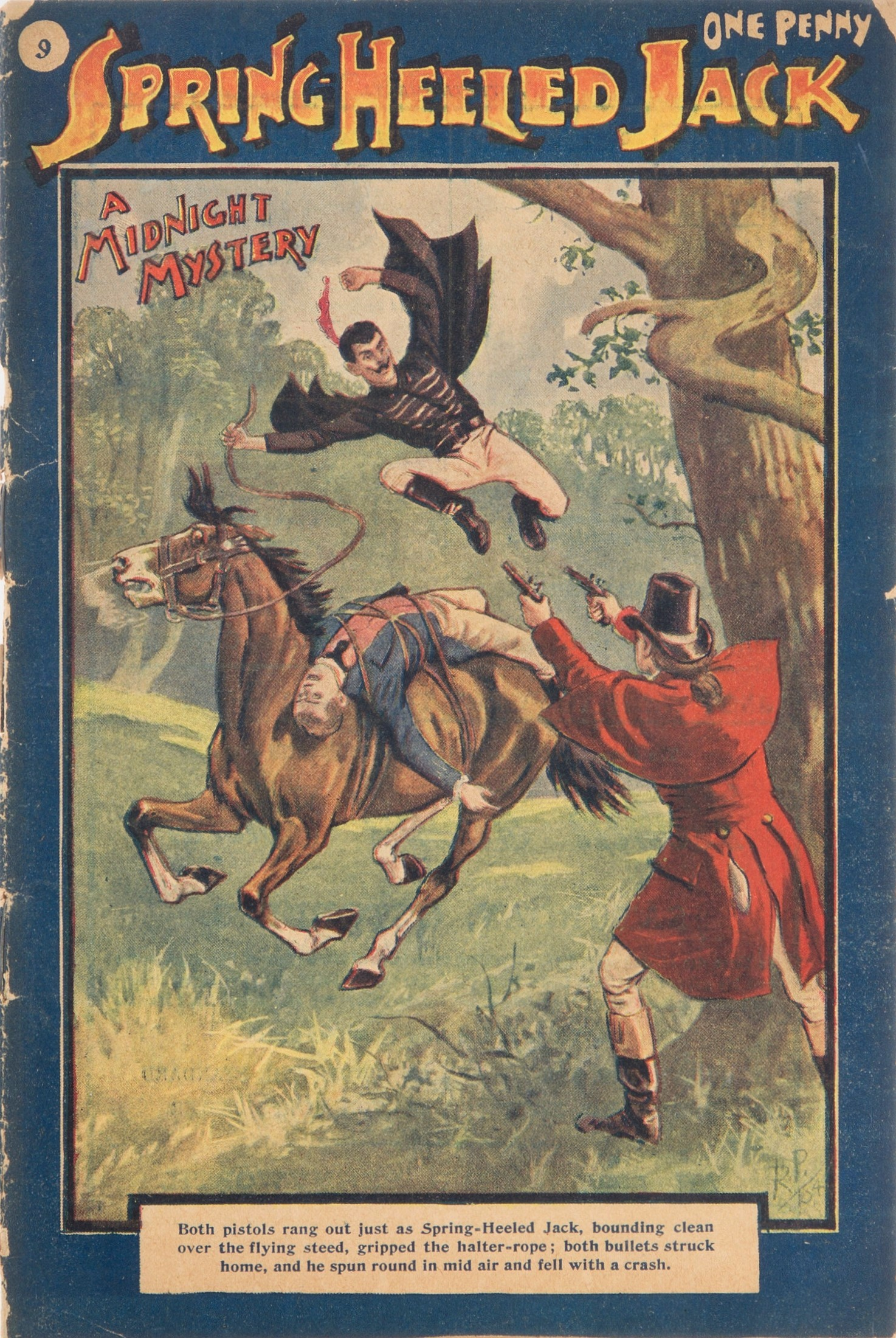
Spring-heeled Jack illustrated on the cover of the 1904 serial Spring-heeled Jack

The character of Spring-heeled Jack has been revived or referenced in a variety of 20th and 21st century media, including:

The Strange Affair of Spring-Heeled Jack (2010) – an alternate history novel by author Mark Hodder, portraying Spring-Heeled Jack as a time traveler.

The Springheel Saga (2011) – a three-series audio drama produced by the Wireless Theatre Company.

== See also ==
- Devil's Footprints
- Jack the Ripper
- Jersey Devil
- Jiangshi
- Krampus
- London Monster
- Mothman
- Owlman
- Batman
- The Shadow
