= Jenny Runacre =

South African-born English actress (born 1946)

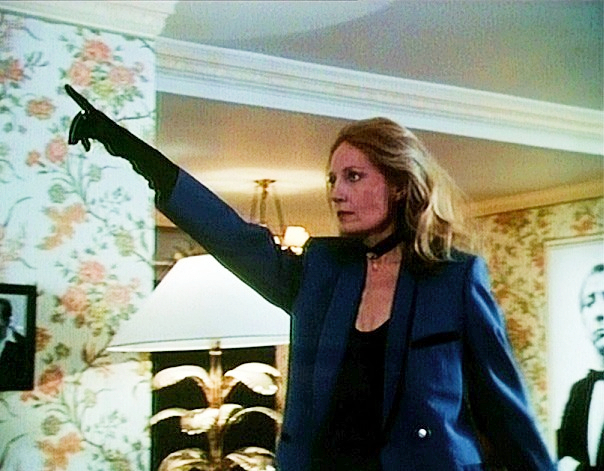
- Runacre in The Optimist (1985)
- Born: 18 August 1946 (age 80); Cape Town, South Africa
- Education: Central Saint Martins (MFA)
- Occupations: Actress, theatre director
- Years active: 1969–present
- Website: www.jennyrunacre.co.uk

Jenny Runacre (/ˈrʌnəkər/ RUN-ə-kər; born 18 August 1946) is a South African-born English actress and theatre director. Her film appearances include Husbands (1970), The Canterbury Tales (1972), The Passenger (1975), The Duellists (1977), Jubilee (1978), The Lady Vanishes (1979), and The Witches (1990).

== Career ==
Runacre was born to English parents in Cape Town, South Africa in 1946. She moved to London as a child, attended the Actors' Workshop there, and trained in the Stanislavski System.

While attending the Actors' Workshop, Runacre was approached by fellow student (and future agent) Tom Busby, who was working as a runner for an American film production that was seeking fledgling English actresses to play opposite John Cassavetes in Husbands, a film to be shot the following year in London. The young actress auditioned with Cassavetes, Ben Gazzara and Peter Falk, and was told six weeks later that she was being offered the part of Mary Tynan in the film. Runacre accepted the offer and Husbands became her first important film role.

Runacre then joined the original London cast of Oh! Calcutta!. Runacre left the cast after a year and starred in such films as Pier Paolo Pasolini's The Canterbury Tales, John Huston's The Mackintosh Man, Robert Fuest's The Final Programme, Michelangelo Antonioni's The Passenger, and Derek Jarman's Jubilee, in which she starred as Elizabeth I and "Bod". She was active in the theatre as well as on British television, including an appearance as an art con artist in an episode of Lovejoy as well as playing Brenda Champion in the noted series Brideshead Revisited.

Runacre focused on higher education in the 1990s. She has a Master's in Fine Art Practice from Central Saint Martin's College of Art and Design. She is currently a lecturer in residence in art, and has worked in installation art and experimental filmmaking.

In 2007, Runacre directed Gareth Parker and Andrew Swann's Frozen, which was nominated for Best Direction, Best Writing and Best Overall Production in the LOST Theatre Festival. She also directed the Wireless Theatre Company's audio adaption of Frozen after its successful stage run, featuring the original cast. In 2008, she made her Edinburgh Fringe directing debut with Gullibility Factor by Peter Yates.

In 2008, Runacre appeared in John Maybury's The Edge of Love (2008) and starred as Alice in Volcano Theatre Company's National tour of Alice in Wonderland.

== Selected filmography ==
- Goodbye, Mr. Chips (1969)
- Husbands (1970) – Mary Tynan
- The Canterbury Tales (1972) – Alison
- The Creeping Flesh (1973) – Emmanuel's Wife
- The Mackintosh Man (1973) – Gerda
- The Final Programme (1973) – Miss Brunner
- Son of Dracula (1974) – Woman in Black
- All Creatures Great and Small (1975) – Pamela
- The Passenger (1975) – Rachel
- Joseph Andrews (1977) – The Gypsy
- Spectre (1977) – Sydna
- The Duellists (1977) – Mme. de Lionne
- Three Dangerous Ladies (1977) – Mrs. Santander (segment "The Island")
- Jubilee (1978) – Queen Elizabeth I / Bod
- The Sweeney (1978) episode "the bigger they are".
- The Lady Vanishes (1979) – Mrs. Todhunter
- Hussy (1980) – Vere
- The Optimist (1985) - Mrs. Big
- Brideshead Revisited (1981) – Brenda Champion
- Shadey (1985) – Shop assistant
- That Englishwoman (1990) – Lady Mary Hobhouse
- The Witches (1990) – Elsie
- Restoration (1995) – Painter Lady
- The Edge of Love (2008) – Woman in Yellow Dress
- Boogie Woogie (2009) – Mrs. Havermeyer
- Camberwell Beauty (2015) – Dominique
- Meet Pursuit Delange: The Movie (2015) – Miss Haversham
- Perfect Piece (2016) – Mrs. Di Grazia
