= The Alley Man =

1959 short story by Philip José Farmer

"The Alley Man" was originally published in the June 1959 issue of F & SF, with a cover illustration by Ed Emshwiller.

"The Alley Man" (1959) is a science fiction short story by American writer Philip José Farmer (1918-2009). It relates the life of Old Man Paley, who may or may not be the last Neanderthal — or "Paleolithic" man, as his name suggests — still alive in the 20th century.

== Publication history ==
"The Alley Man" was originally published in The Magazine of Fantasy and Science Fiction in June 1959. It was subsequently republished by Ballantine Books in the 1962 compilation The Alley God, by DAW Books in the 1973 compilation The Book of Philip José Farmer, by Crown Publishers in the 1984 compilation The Classic Philip José Farmer 1952-1964, and in the 2006 anthology The Best of Philip José Farmer by Subterranean Press.

== Critical reception ==
"The Alley Man" was nominated for a Hugo Award for Short Fiction in 1960, coming in second.

P. Schuyler Miller called "The Alley Man" a "robust, rambling comic tragedy of a dying species, trying to keep its heredity straight, clinging to its old legends, holding its own against the G'yaga, the False Folk who have inherited the Earth", described Paley as "Alley Oop as seen by Eugene O'Neill", and said that although the story itself was "negligible", the character of Paley "is everything".

Sam Moskowitz considered the story to be Farmer's emulation of L. Sprague de Camp's 1939 "The Gnarly Man".
