= Peter Haining (author) =

British journalist, author and anthologist

- Born: 2 April 1940; Enfield, Middlesex, England
- Died: 19 November 2007 (aged 67)
- Occupation: Author

Peter Alexander Haining (2 April 1940 – 19 November 2007) was a British journalist, author and anthologist who lived and worked in Suffolk.

== Biography ==
Born in Enfield, Middlesex, Haining began his career as a reporter in Essex and then moved to London where he worked on a trade magazine before joining the publishing house of New English Library in 1963. He achieved the position of editorial director before becoming a full-time writer in the early 1970s.

He edited a large number of anthologies, predominantly of horror and fantasy short stories, wrote non-fiction books on a variety of topics from the Channel Tunnel to Sweeney Todd and also used the pen names "Ric Alexander" and "Richard Peyton" on a number of crime story anthologies. In the 1970s he wrote three novels, including The Hero (1973), which was optioned for filming.

In two controversial books, Haining argued that Sweeney Todd was a real historical figure who committed his crimes around 1800, was tried in December 1801, and was hanged in January 1802. However, other researchers who have tried to verify his citations find nothing in these sources to back Haining's claims. Strong reservations have also been expressed regarding the reliability of another of Haining's influential non-fiction works, The Legend and Bizarre Crimes of Spring Heeled Jack.

He wrote several reference books on the BBC TV programme Doctor Who, including the 20th anniversary special Doctor Who: A Celebration Two Decades Through Time and Space (1983), and also wrote the definitive study of Sherlock Holmes on the screen, The Television Sherlock Holmes (1991) and several other television tie-ins featuring famous literary characters, including Maigret, Poirot, Dr. Finlay and James Bond. Peter Haining's most recent project was a series of World War Two stories based on extensive research and personal interviews: The Jail That Went To Sea (2003), The Mystery of Rommel's Gold (2004), Where The Eagle Landed (2004), The Chianti Raiders (2005) and The Banzai Hunters (2007).

He won the British Fantasy Awards Karl Edward Wagner Award in 2001.

== Partial bibliography ==
Peter Haining contributed to over 170 books, editing the vast majority, a few of which are listed here.

- The Freak Show (1970)
- Haining, Peter, ed. (1971). The Necromancers: The Best of Black Magic And Witchcraft. London: Hodder and Stoughton. ISBN 9780340125960.
- The Sherlock Holmes Scrapbook (1973) Indispensable for collectors of Sherlockiana
- The Legend and Bizarre Crimes of Spring Heeled Jack (1977)
- M. R. James - Book of the Supernatural (1979) (ISBN 0-572-01048-6) Introduction by Sir John Betjeman. Articles and rare items about MRJ
- A Sherlock Holmes Compendium (1980)
- The Barbarian Swordsmen (1981)
- Doctor Who: The Key to Time A year by year record (1984) (ISBN 0-491-03283-8)
- Haining, Peter, ed. (1987). Werewolf: Horror Stories of the Man-Beast. London: Severn House Publishers. ISBN 9780727814654.
- —— (November 1988). Doctor Who: 25 Glorious Years. London: W. H. Allen. ISBN 1-85227-021-7.
- Sweeney Todd: The Real Story of the Demon Barber of Fleet Street (1993) London: Robson Books
- Haining, Peter; Cook, Jean, eds. (1993). MG Log: A Celebration of the World's Favourite Sports Car. London: Souvenir Press. ISBN 0-285-63144-6.
- On Call with Doctor Finlay (1994) London: Boxtree Limited
- London After Midnight (1996)
- Haining, Peter, ed. (1997). Timescapes: Stories of Time Travel. London: Souvenir Press. ISBN 0285633872.
- The Nine Lives of Doctor Who (1999)

== In popular culture ==
In Lucio Fulci's film Don't Torture a Duckling, at 1:42:32 in the film, one of the characters (Andrea Martelli) is seen reading the book "I Classici della Magia Nera" ("Classics of Black Magic") edited by Peter Haining, which actually belongs to the character Patrizia. This is an Italian translation of Haining's anthology The Satanists.
