= Esther Carlson =

American author

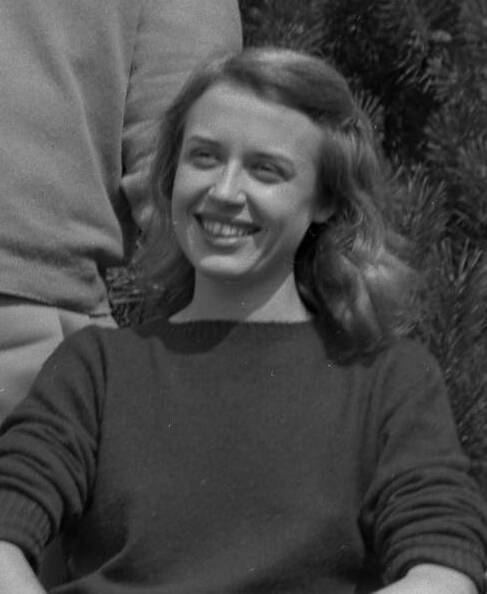
- Born: August 21, 1920; Marshalltown
- Died: March 14, 1991; Saint Michaels

Esther Carlson (21 August 1920 – 14 March 1991) was an American author. She published one novel, Moon Over the Back Fence (1947).

== Life ==
Esther Carlson was born in Marshalltown, Iowa, the daughter of Albert Carl Carlson and Ellen Mower Carlson. She graduated from Marshalltown High School in 1938, where she was elected wittiest student, and Grinnell College in 1942. She moved to New York City in 1943, where she held a number of jobs including freelance journalism and advertising. In New York, she befriended author Richard Wright and introduced him to James Baldwin. Wright was one of the sponsors for her fellowship to the 1946 Bread Loaf Writers' Conference.

She published her short story "The Radiant Wood" in the Atlantic Monthly in September 1946. Wright praised the story in his journal when he heard the story the previous year: "I had goose pimples on me". Carlson wrote to Wright after its publication "I reflected today how you were the first one in my whole life who told me sincerely that I could write".

Her 1947 novel Moon Over the Back Fence was about a little girl, Ellen, who befriends an imaginary Uncle George. Other short stories include a humorous series about Dr. Aesop Abercrombie in The Magazine of Fantasy and Science Fiction (1953-1954) and "Room With a View" in Fantastic (1953).

Carlson worked as an elementary school teacher in New Jersey and Maryland. She was instrumental in the preservation of Navesink Twin Lights and founded the Underwater Naturalist, the journal of the American Littoral Society.

Esther Carlson died on 14 March 1991 in Saint Michaels, Maryland.
