= Edward Wellen =

American writer and editor (1919–2011)

- Born: Edward Paul Levy; March 2, 1922; New Rochelle, New York
- Died: October 24, 2011 (aged 89); New Rochelle, New York
- Education: New Rochelle High School (1933-1937), Shrivenham American University (1945)
- Alma mater: City College of New York (1951–1955)
- Occupation: author
- Writing career
- Pen name: Paul Felder, Lew Gellert, Larry Killian
- Period: 1952–2002
- Genres: Crime fiction, science fiction
- Military career
- Branch: United States Army
- Service years: 1942–1945
- Unit: Chemical Warfare Service
- Awards: European–African–Middle Eastern Campaign Medal

Edward Wellen (born Edward Paul Levy; October 2, 1919 – January 15, 2011) was an American mystery and science fiction writer.

== Early life and career ==
Born to a Jewish family in New Rochelle, New York City, Wellen was the son of Russian-born tailor, Hyman Levy, and a Russian American mother, Lillian Wilensky. The name Wellen was an anglicized version of his mother's maiden surname, to which she and her children reverted after she and Levy divorced, not long after Edward's birth. As Edward Wellen, he attended the Huguenot School, Isaac A. Young Junior High School and New Rochelle High School, graduating cum laude in 1937.

After working a number of years for the Pelham Coal and Oil Company in Pelham, New York, Wellen served in the North African, Mediterranean and European theatres with the Chemical Warfare Service in World War II, earning the European–African–Middle Eastern Campaign Medal and seven battle stars. In 1945, while still in Europe, he attended Shrivenham American University. Later he attended City College of New York, graduating in 1955.

In 1960, Wellen wrote a script for the ABC series Bourbon Street Beat entitled "Swamp Fire", which aired on April 11, directed by Andre de Toth. In 1964, first prize in Birmingham (Alabama) Festival of Arts television script competition went to Wellen's The Hubert Otis, described by Variety as "a satire about a nobody with a yen to become a somebody by retaining a pubrelations firm."

As of 1993, it was estimated that, in addition to two novels, Wellen had published 250 mysteries in Ellery Queen's Mystery Magazine, Alfred Hitchcock's Mystery Magazine, and assorted anthologies. That same year, Wellen's novella Mind Slash Matter, about a screenwriter prematurely afflicted with Alzheimer's disease facing the added challenge of solving the murder for which he has just been framed, debuted in the Ed Gorman–Martin H. Greenberg anthology, Predators. In his 1995 collection, Tales of the Batman, Greenberg informed readers that Wellen's novella had been optioned by Tri-Star Pictures as a vehicle for Robin Williams. Although that project never came to fruition, an audiobook featuring actor René Auberjonois was released that year, to generally favorable reviews.

== Personal life and death ==
Predeceased by his sister, Barbara Helen Schreiber, Wellen never married. He died on January 15, 2011.

== Works ==
=== Novels ===
- Hijack (1970, 1971)
- An Hour to Kill (1993)
- Mind Slash Matter (novella, 1993); in Martin Harry Greenberg, Edward Gorman, eds. (1993). Predators

=== Collections ===
- Perps: a short story collection (2001)
- The 21st Golden Age of Science Fiction Megapack (2015)
- The 28th Golden Age of Science Fiction Megapack: Edward Wellen, Volume 2 (2015)

==== Science-Fiction ====
- Origins of Galactic ...
  - Origins of Galactic Slang (1952)
  - Origins of Galactic Law (1953)
  - Origins of Galactic Etiquette (1953)
  - Origins of Galactic Medicine (1953)
  - Origins of Galactic Advice to the Lovelorn (1955)
  - Origins of the Galactic Short-Snorter (1960)
  - Origins of Galactic Fruit Salad (1962)
  - Origins of Galactic Philosophy (1962)
- The Big Cheese (1953)
- Root of Evil (1953)
- The Voices (1954)
- The World in the Jukebox (1956)
- The Superstition-Seeders (1956)
- Tie-Up (1957)
- The Engrammar Age (1957)
- Utter Silence (1957)
- Army Without Banners (1957)
- Sweet Dreams (1957)
- Dr. Vickers’ Car (1957)
- One Per Cent Inspiration (1957)
- Note for a Time Capsule (1958)
- Old Hat (1958)
- Hear a Pin Drop (1959)
- I O U (1961)
- Flashback (1962)
- Deadly Game (1962)
- Apocryphal Fragment (1962)
- Seven Day’s Wonder (1963)
- The Message (1963)
- Deadly Game (1963)
  - Judith Merril, ed. (1963): 8th Annual of the Year's Best SF. New York: Simon and Schuster. ISBN 4488613039
- The Book of Elijah (1964)
- Buffoon (1964)
- With Ah! Bright Wings (1969)
- Shapes to Come (1969)
- These Our Actors (1970)
- Down by the Old Maelstrom (1972)
- No Other Gods (1972)
  - Martin Harry Greenberg, Isaac Asimov, Charles G. Waugh, eds.; John Berkey, illus. (Hrsg.): Catastrophes! New York: Fawcett Crest. ISBN 0449244253.
- The Prisoner (1973)
  - Isaac Asimov, Martin Harry Greenberg, Joseph D. Olander, eds. (1981): Miniature Mysteries : 100 Malicious Little Mystery Stories New York: Taplinger. ISBN 0800852516.
- Call Me Proteus (1973)
- Chalk Talk (1973)
  - Isaac Asimov, Terry Carr, Martin Harry Greenberg, eds. (1974): 100 Great Fantasy Short Short Stories Garden City, New York: Doubleday. ISBN 0385181655.
- The Latest from Sigma Corvi (1973)
- Androids Don’t Cry (1973)
  - Lester Del Rey (1974): Best Science Fiction Stories of the Year : Third Annual Collection. New York: Dutton. ISBN 0525064923.
- Barbarossa (1973)
- Film Buff (1973)
- Godsend (1973)
- The Cryonauts (1973)
- If Eve Had Failed to Conceive (1974)
  - Isaac Asimov, Martin Harry Greenberg, Joseph D. Olander, eds. (1980): Microcosmic Tales : 100 Wondrous Science Fiction Short-Short Stories New York: Taplinger Publishing Company. ISBN 0800852389.
- Too Long at the Fair (1974)
- Why Booth Didn’t Kill Lincoln (1974)
- Mouthpiece (1974). Reprinted:
  - Isaac Asimov, Martin Harry Greenberg, Charles G. Waugh, eds. (1979) The 13 Crimes of Science Fiction. Garden City, NY: Doubleday.
  - Charles G. Waugh, Isaac Asimov, Martin Harry Greenberg, eds. (1992) The Mammoth Book of Fantastic Science Fiction : Short Novels of the 1970s. New York. Carroll & Graf Publishers. ISBN 088184795X.
  - Isaac Asimov, ed. (1993). Sci-Fi Private Eye. West Chester, PA: Dercum Press Active Books. ISBN 1556561695, ISBN 1556561709 Audiocassette, read by Bill Fantini and Nelson Runger
- Tar Baby (1974)
- Thataway (1974)
- The Second Fall, or Anthony Comstock’s Final Victory (1974)
- Sanity Clause (1975)
  - Edward L. Ferman, David November, eds. (1976, 1977). The Best from Fantasy and Science Fiction. 22nd Series. Garden City, NY: Doubleday. ISBN 0385124511.
  - David G. Hartwell (1992). Christmas Stars. New York: T. Doherty Associates. ISBN 0812522869.
- Deadpan (1975)
- Ransom (1977)
- Further Deponent Sayeth Not (1977)
- Bearings (1978)
- Errata Slip (1978)
- Errata Slip Number Two (1978)
- Goldbrick (1978)
- While-You-Wait (1979)
- Finger of Fate (1980)
- Checkmate (1980)
- Heroic Measures (1981)
- Hotline (1981)
- Spur the Nightmare (1983)
- Pattern (1984)
- Voiceover (1984)
  - Isaac Asimov, Martin Harry Greenberg, Charles G. Waugh, eds. (1984). Sherlock Holmes Through Time and Space. New York: Bluejay Books, ISBN 0312944004.
- Waswolf (1987)
- Dead Ringer (1987)
- From Parts Unknown (1988)
- Murder in the Urth Degree (1989)
- The Opera of the Phantom (1989)
- Wise Men of Gotham (1989)
- Overkill (1990)
- Balloons (1990)
- Cool Cat (1990)
  - Ronald M. Hahn, ed. (1992): Hüter der Zeit: Eine Auswahl der Besten Erzählungen aus The Magazine of Fantasy and Science Fiction. München: W. Heyne. ISBN 3453054024.
- Happy Hunting Ground (1993)
- Mind Slash Matter (1993), in Martin Harry Greenberg, Edward Gorman, eds. (1993). Predators.
- Sandy Claws (1993)
- The Driven Snow (1993)
- Deja Vu All Over Again (1993)
- The Smart Sword (1993)

==== Crime ====
- Dope to Kill (1958)
- I Hated Her Guts (1958)
- Check Out (1959)
- Cicero (1959)
- The Double Take (1959)
- The Taste of Revenge (1959)
- Which One’s the Guilty One? (1959)
- Inside Story (1962)
- Like Son (1964)
- Mercy (1964)
- Siege Perilous (1964)
- Whitemail (1964)
- Hangover (1966)
- Frozen Assets (1969)
- Brush with Death (1970)
- Dark Motive (1970)
- Recoil (1971, als Larry Killian)
- Dead Broke (1970)
- Inflationary Spiral (1970)
- Possession (1970)
- Promises to Keep (1970)
- Rub the Wrong Way (1970, as Paul Felder)
- The Big Difference (1970, as Lew Gellert)
- The Woman in Black (1970)
- Broken Trail (1971)
- Murder Will Out (1971)
- Shock Treatment (1971)
- The Look of Gratitude (1971)
- The Assassin (1972)
- Adam’s Lib (1973)
- A Huddle of Armchairs (1973)
- A Type of Crime (1973)
- Ballade of the Jailbird (1973)
- Before the Deluge (1973)
- Headwork (1973)
- I Kid You Not (1973)
- IV, 8 (1973)
- Lend Me Your Ears (1973)
- O, for a Sign (1973)
- Salami Where He Hid (1973)
- Sentence of Death (1973)
- Squeeze Play (1973)
- The Hunter and the Hunted (1973)
- The Last Fable (1973)
- The Origin of Crime (1973)
- The Prisoner (1973)
- $1.81 (1974)
- Every One Has a Secret (1974)
- Final Acquittal (1974)
- Hit or Miss (1974)
- Long in the Tooth (1974)
- One Good Turn (1974)
- Play Death (1974)
- Scents in the Dark (1974)
- Sounds in the Dark (1974)
- The Corrector of Destinies (1974)
  - Ellery Queen (1976) Ellery Queen's Crime Wave : 24 Stories from Ellery Queen's Mystery Magazine. New York: Putnam. ISBN 0399117377.
- The Dog in the Night (1974)
- A Wreath for Justice (1975)
- Buck Fever (1975)
- Fight Fire with Fire (1975, as Paul Felder)
- Hang for a Sheep (1975)
- High Stakes (1975)
- I (1975)
- Law of the Jungle (1975)
- Mrs. Grady’s Swan Song (1975)
- Something Phony (1975)
- The Tipoff [unnamed jailhouse lawyer] (1975)
- To Charm a Cobra (1975)
- Bannerman Collection (1976)
- Between You, Me, and the Lamppost (1976)
- Fair Exchange (1976)
- Inside Evidence (1976)
- It Ain’t Hay (1976)
- Rubout (1976)
- The Coinshooter (1976)
- The Long Arm of El Jefe (1976)
- The Perfect Rotter (1976)
- Two Birds (1976)
- Coma Vigil (1977)
- Full Coverage (1977)
- Lady Luck (1977)
- Room 423 (1977)
- Silent Partner (1977)
- The Last Mile (1977)
- Devil’s Pass (1978)
- Experiment (1978)
- How Say You? (1978)
- The Adventure of the Blind Alley (1978)
  - Martin Greenberg, ed. (1979). Best Detective Stories of the Year, 1979 : 33rd Annual Collection. New York: E. P. Dutton, ISBN 0525064389.
- In Ancient Jerusalem (1979)
- In Old Vienna (1979)
- Spotting Agent (1979)
- The Plan of the Snake (1979)
- Trouble Light (1979)
- Death Dance (1980)
- In Old Edinburgh (1980)
- The Time and the Place (1980)
- The Whisper of Gold (1980)
- The Payoff (1981)
- A Lesson for Bodkin (1982)
- The Man from the Fifty-ninth (1983)
- Born Victims (1984)
- Nothing of the Kind (1985)
- Slashaxe (1986)
- Ten O’Clock (1987)
- Red Is the Color of My Truelove’s Blood (1996)
- Stork Trek (with Josh Pachter) (1985)

==== Western ====
- Enough Rope (1953)
- Potlatch (1970)
- Loaded Guns (1971)
