= Paul Alexander (artist) =

American artist and illustrator (1937–2021)

- Born: Paul R. Alexander; September 3, 1937; Richmond, Indiana
- Died: June 14, 2021 (aged 83); Greenville, Ohio
- Known for: Illustration

Paul R. Alexander (September 3, 1937 – June 14, 2021) was an American commercial artist and illustrator. In a career spanning from 1976 to 1998, he specialized in creating art for the covers of science fiction paperbacks and occasionally magazines. He was usually credited as Paul Alexander, but occasionally as Paul R. Alexander.

== Life and career ==
Alexander was born on September 3, 1937, in Richmond, Wayne County, Indiana, the son of Fred and Ora Olive Alexander. He graduated from Wittenburg University in Springfield, Ohio, in 1967, and also studied at the Art Center College of Design, Los Angeles. He was "one of the top science fiction paperback cover artists of the 1970s and '80s." His career as a commercial artist on the East Coast spanned from 1976 to 1998. He was also a model train collector. Alexander died on June 14, 2021, at the Brethren Retirement Community in Greenville, Ohio. He was survived by a brother and sister-in-law, niece, and nephew.

== Reception ==
Vincent Di Fate, fellow science fiction illustrator and a historian of the field, grouped Alexander together with Dean Ellis, Christopher Foss and John Berkey as "gadget" artists, "adept at painting futuristic hardware."
