= Wisbech Theatre (disambiguation) =

Wisbech Theatre may refer to:

- Wisbech Electric Theatre, Wisbech, Isle of Ely, Cambridgeshire, England
- Angles Theatre, Wisbech, Isle of Ely, Cambridgeshire, England
- The Wisbech Players, Wisbech, Isle of Ely, Cambridgeshire, England
