= Clarissa; or, The History of a Young Lady =

1748 novel by Samuel Richardson

Clarissa, or, The History of a Young Lady
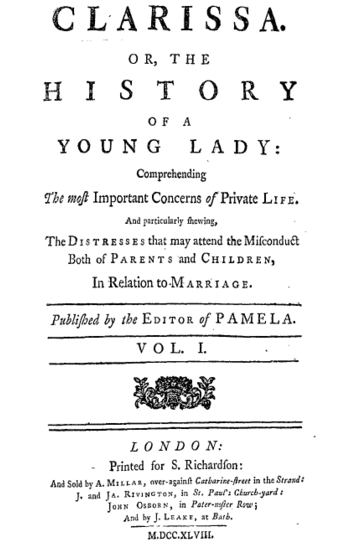
- Author: Samuel Richardson
- Language: English
- Genre: Epistolary novel
- Publication date: 1748
- Publication place: Great Britain
- Media type: Print

Clarissa; or, The History of a Young Lady: Comprehending the Most Important Concerns of Private Life. And Particularly Shewing, the Distresses that May Attend the Misconduct Both of Parents and Children, In Relation to Marriage is an epistolary novel by English writer Samuel Richardson, published in 1748. The novel tells the tragic story of a young woman, Clarissa Harlowe, whose quest for virtue is continually thwarted by her family. The Harlowes are a nouveau riche family whose preoccupation with increasing their standing in society leads to obsessive control of their daughter, Clarissa.

Many versions of the book exist, because Samuel Richardson rewrote the novel several times and he had it republished with the revisions. It is considered one of the longest novels in the English language (based on estimated word count). It is generally regarded as Richardson's masterpiece. In 2015, the BBC ranked Clarissa 14th on its list of the 100 greatest British novels. In 2013, The Guardian included Clarissa among the 100 best novels written in English.

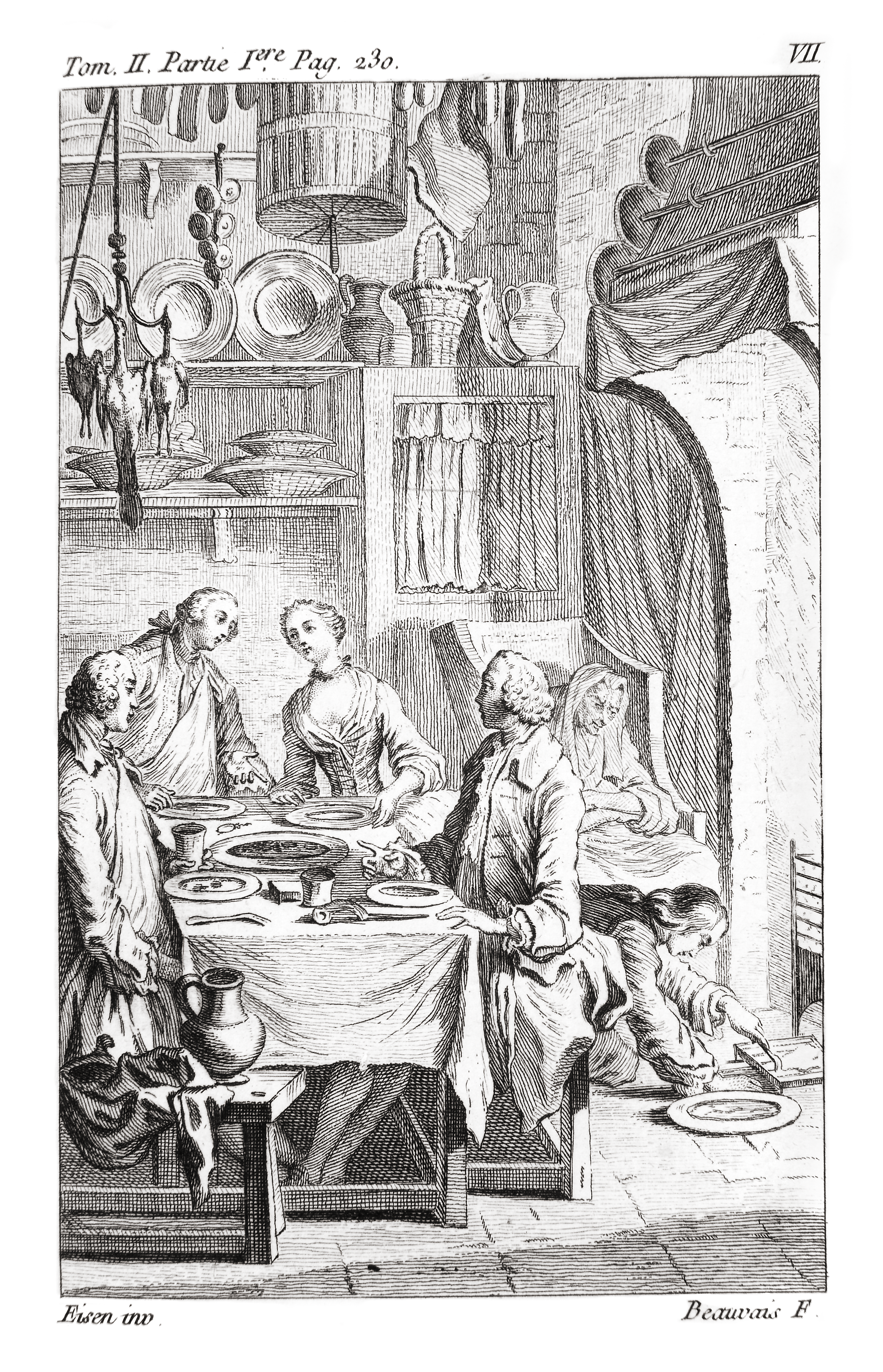
Picture from "Lettres angloises, ou histoire de Miss Clarisse Harlove" (1751)

== Plot summary ==
Robert Lovelace, a wealthy libertine, courts Clarissa's older sister Arabella, who rejects him for addressing his suit to her parents rather than to her. He turns to Clarissa, inflaming Arabella's jealousy and the hostility of their brother James, who had once fought a duel with him; both siblings resent that their grandfather left Clarissa an estate. The Harlowes press Clarissa to marry Roger Solmes, whom she finds repellent, and her refusal convinces them that her professed dislike of Lovelace is a lie. The family confines Clarissa to her room and forbids her to write to her friend Anna Howe until she consents. She corresponds with Anna in secret, and begins a clandestine correspondence with Lovelace. Neither side will concede, and communication between parents and daughter breaks down.

Lovelace has come to regard Clarissa's famed virtue as a challenge, boasting to his friend John Belford that he intends to put it to "trial", and relishing the chance to spite the Harlowes. He presses her to elope. She reluctantly agrees, then writes to call it off, but he deliberately leaves the letter unread in its hiding place. When she comes in person at the appointed hour to tell him, his servant stages a commotion at the house. Fearing discovery, she stops resisting and is carried off.

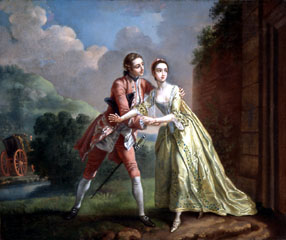
The villain, Robert Lovelace, abducting Clarissa Harlowe

In his power, Clarissa rightly suspects that he means to seduce rather than wed her. Her family refuse to forgive the perceived betrayal of her elopement, and her father invokes a curse upon her, that her disobedience will bring her ruin in this world and punishment in the next.

Lovelace holds her for months in several lodgings, including, unknown to her, a brothel, whose women he passes off as respectable ladies. He introduces her to his rakish friends, among them Belford, who becomes an admirer and urges him to marry her. Lovelace mocks him and continues the "trial". Under the pretence of rescuing her from a fire he forces his way into her bedroom; she repels him and, under threat of rape, promises to marry him. Considering a promise made under duress void, she escapes to lodgings in Hampstead.

Lovelace finds, takes the rooms around her and hires impostors to play his respectable relations. He intercepts a warning letter from Anna Howe and forges others to end the correspondence. He persuades Clarissa to go out in a carriage with the false relatives and carries her back to the brothel, where, with the help of the madam and the prostitutes, he drugs and rapes her.

Clarissa loses her reason for several days, writing incoherent "mad letters", verses and begging to be admitted to an asylum to die in peace. When she recovers, Lovelace expects her to capitulate; instead she is repulsed by him and refuses his genuine offers of marriage, despite her position as a fallen woman. Persuading himself that the "trial" was invalid because she had been drugged, he sets out to rape her a second time without opiates; she threatens to kill herself with a pen-knife and he retreats.

Called away to a dying uncle from whom he expects an earldom, Lovelace leaves Clarissa confined. She escapes but the brothel madam has her arrested for unpaid bills and Clarissa, wretched in prison, takes it for the first part of her father's curse fulfilled. Belford bails her out and she takes lodgings with a shopkeeper. Corresponding with his real family, she learns the full extent of his deception, and refuses his offers of marriage. Ill and barely eating, she puts her affairs in order and appoints Belford her executor.

Clarissa petitions her father to revoke his curse and he does so. She dies in the full consciousness of her virtue, attended by her cousin Colonel Morden. In her will she asks that her body not be medically examined, leaving open the possibility that she was pregnant. Her relatives acknowledge their fault only after learning of her death. Lovelace departs for Europe. Learning that Morden means to demand satisfaction, he arranges a meeting; they fight at Trent, and Lovelace dies of his wounds the next day, saying "let this expiate!"

== Principal characters ==
- Clarissa Harlowe – the title character, a virtuous young woman whose family pressure and Lovelace's pursuit drive the novel.
- Robert Lovelace – a libertine who abducts and rapes Clarissa; the novel's antagonist.
- Anna Howe – Clarissa's closest friend and principal correspondent.
- John Belford – Lovelace's friend and correspondent, who comes to side with Clarissa and becomes her executor.
- James Harlowe Jr. – Clarissa's brother, whose enmity toward Lovelace drives the family's hostility.
- Arabella Harlowe – Clarissa's older sister, courted by Lovelace before he turns to Clarissa.
- Roger Solmes – the wealthy suitor Clarissa's family presses her to marry.
- Mrs Sinclair – the London brothel keeper who assists Lovelace.
- Colonel Morden – Clarissa's cousin, who eventually duels Lovelace.

== Publication ==
The first two volumes were published in December 1747, and the subsequent five volumes were published in 1748. The word count of the novel is approximately 970,000 words, and it is "the longest novel in the English canon".

== Response ==
Clarissa is generally regarded by critics to be among the masterpieces of eighteenth-century European literature. Influential critic Harold Bloom cited it as one of his favourite novels that he "tend[ed] to re-read every year or so". The novel was well-received as it was being released. Many readers pressured Richardson for a happy ending with a wedding between Clarissa and Lovelace. At the novel's end, many readers were upset, and some even wrote alternative endings for the story with a happier conclusion. Some of the most well-known ones included happier alternative endings written by two sisters, Lady Bradshaigh and Lady Echlin. Richardson felt that the story's morals and messages failed to reach his audience properly. In later editions of the novel, he attempted to make Clarissa's character appear purer while also Lovelace's character became more sinister, in hopes of making his audience better understand his intentions in writing the novel. The pioneering American nurse Clara Barton's full name was Clarissa Harlowe Barton, after the heroine of Richardson's novel.

== Critical Edition ==
- Penguin Classics (1985), Edited by Angus Ross (based on the 1st edition)
- The Cambridge Edition of the Works of Samuel Richardson (forthcoming)

== Adaptations ==
=== Theatre ===
- Clarissa; or the Fatal Seduction (1788), by Robert Porrett. This adaptation was printed, but never performed.
- Clarissa Harlowe (1846), by T.H. Lacy and John Courtney, premiered at the Princess's Theatre on 28 September 1846.
- Clarissa (1875), by Dion Boucicalt, premiered in New York in 1875, starring Rose Coghlan as the titular character and C.F. Coghlan as Lovelace
- Clarissa Harlowe (1890), opera libretto, by Jules Barbier and Paul de Choudens. This text was written for an unfinished score by Bizet, but was never set to music.
- Clarissa (1976), opera, composed by Robin Holloway, who also wrote the piece's libretto.

=== Radio & Television ===
The BBC adapted the novel as a television series in 1991, starring Sean Bean, Saskia Wickham, and Sean Pertwee.

BBC Radio 4 released a radio adaptation in March and April 2010, starring Richard Armitage and Zoe Waites.

== See also ==
- Eneas Sweetland Dallas, editor of a 1868 abridged version of Clarissa
- Forced seduction
- Pamela; or, Virtue Rewarded
- The History of Sir Charles Grandison

== General sources ==
Most entries below from the Richardson Bibliography by John A. Dussinger

- John Carroll, "Lovelace as Tragic Hero", University of Toronto Quarterly 42 (1972): 14–25.
- Anthony Winner, "Richardson's Lovelace: Character and Prediction", Texas Studies in Literature and Language 14 (1972): 53–75.
- Jonathan Loesberg, "Allegory and Narrative in Clarissa", Novel 15 (Fall 1981): 39–59.
- Leo Braudy, "Penetration and Impenetrability in Clarissa", in New Aspects of the Eighteenth Century: Essays from the English Institute, ed. Phillip Harth (New York: Columbia Univ. Press, 1974).
- Terry Eagleton, The Rape of Clarissa: Writing, Sexuality, and Class Struggle in Samuel Richardson (Oxford: Blackwell, 1982).
- John Traugott, "Molesting Clarissa", Novel 15 (1982): 163–170.
- Sue Warrick Doederlein, "Clarissa in the Hands of the Critics", Eighteenth-Century Studies 16 (1983): 401–414.
- Terry Castle, "Lovelace's Dream", Studies in Eighteenth-Century Culture 13 (1984): 29–42.
- Sarah Fielding, "Remarks on 'Clarissa'", introduction by Peter Sabor (Augustan Reprint Society, 231–232). Facsimile reprint 1749 (Los Angeles: William Andrews Clark Memorial Library, 1985).
- Florian Stuber, "On Fathers and Authority in 'Clarissa'", 25 (Summer 1985): 557–574.
- Donald R. Wehrs, "Irony, Storytelling and the Conflict of Interpretation in Clarissa", ELH 53 (1986): 759–778.
- Margaret Anne Doody, "Disguise and Personality in Richardson's Clarissa", Eighteenth-Century Life n.s. 12, no. 2 (1988): 18–39.
- Jonathan Lamb, "The Fragmentation of Originals and Clarissa", SEL 28 (1988): 443–459.
- Raymond Stephanson, "Richardson's 'Nerves': The Philosophy of Sensibility in 'Clarissa'", Journal of the History of Ideas 49 (1988): 267–285.
- Peter Hynes, "Curses, Oaths, and Narrative in Richardson's 'Clarissa'", ELH 56 (1989): 311–326.
- Brenda Bean, "Sight and Self-Disclosure: Richardson's Revision of Swift's 'The Lady's Dressing Room'", Eighteenth-Century Life 14 (1990): 1–23.
- Thomas O. Beebee, "Clarissa" on the Continent: Translation and Seduction (University Park: Pennsylvania State Univ., 1990).
- Jocelyn Harris, "Protean Lovelace", Eighteenth-Century Fiction 2 (1990): 327–346.
- Raymond F. Hilliard, "Clarissa and Ritual Cannibalism", PMLA 105 (1990): 1083–1097.
- Nicholas Hudson, "Arts of Seduction and the Rhetoric of Clarissa", Modern Language Quarterly 51 (1990): 25–43.
- Helen M. Ostovich, "'Our Views Must Now Be Different': Imprisonment and Friendship in 'Clarissa'", Modern Language Quarterly 52 (1991): 153–169.
- Tom Keymer, Richardson's "Clarissa" and the Eighteenth-Century Reader (Cambridge: Cambridge Univ. Press, 1992). Probably the most important book-length study of Richardson after the first wave of Kinkead-Weakes, Doody, Flynn, and others in the 1970s and 1980s.
- David C. Hensley, "Thomas Edwards and the Dialectics of Clarissa's Death Scene", Eighteenth-Century Life 16, no. 3 (1992): 130–152.
- Lois A. Chaber, "A 'Fatal Attraction'? The BBC and Clarissa", Eighteenth-Century Fiction 4 (April 1992): 257–263.
- Mildred Sarah Greene, "The French Clarissa", in Man and Nature: Proceedings of the Canadian Society for Eighteenth-Century Studies, ed. Christa Fell and James Leith (Edmonton: Academic Printing & Publishing, 1992), pp. 89–98.
- Elizabeth W. Harries, "Fragments and Mastery: Dora and Clarissa", Eighteenth-Century Fiction 5 (April 1993): 217–238.
- Richard Hannaford, "Playing Her Dead Hand: Clarissa's Posthumous Letters", Texas Studies in Literature and Language 35 (Spring 1993): 79–102.
- Lois E. Bueler, Clarissa's Plots (Newark, DE: Associated Univ. Presses, 1994).
- Tom Keymer, "Clarissa's Death, Clarissa's Sale, and the Text of the Second Edition", Review of English Studies 45 (Aug. 1994): 389–396.
- Martha J. Koehler, "Epistolary Closure and Triangular Return in Richardson's 'Clarissa'", Journal of Narrative Technique 24 (Fall 1994): 153–172.
- Margaret Anne Doody, "Heliodorus Rewritten: Samuel Richardson's 'Clarissa' and Frances Burney's 'Wanderer'", in The Search for the Ancient Novel, ed. James Tatum (Baltimore: Johns Hopkins Univ. Press, 1994), pp. 117–131.
- Joy Kyunghae Lee, "The Commodification of Virtue: Chastity and the Virginal Body in Richardson's 'Clarissa'", The Eighteenth Century: Theory and Interpretation 36 (Spring 1995): 38–54.
- Mary Vermillion, "Clarissa and the Marriage Act", Eighteenth-Century Fiction 10 (1997): 395–412.
- Daniel P. Gunn, "Is Clarissa Bourgeois Art?" Eighteenth-Century Fiction 10 (Oct. 1997): 1–14.
- Brian McCrea, "Clarissa's Pregnancy and the Fate of Patriarchal Power", Eighteenth-Century Fiction 9 (Jan. 1997): 125–148.
- Mary Patricia Martin, "Reading Reform in Richardson's 'Clarissa' and the Tactics of Sentiment", SEL 37 (Summer 1997): 595–614.
- Paul Gordon Scott, "Disinterested Selves: Clarissa and the Tactics of Sentiment", ELH 64 (1997): 473–502.
- Donnalee Frega, Speaking in Hunger: Gender, Discourse, and Consumption in "Clarissa" (Columbia, SC: Univ. of South Carolina Press, 1998).
- Laura Hinton, "The Heroine's Subjection: Clarissa, Sadomasochism, and Natural Law", Eighteenth-Century Studies 32 (Spring 1999): 293–308.
- Murray L. Brown, "Authorship and Generic Exploitation: Why Lovelace Must Fear Clarissa", SNNTS 30 (Summer 1998): 246–259.
- Derek Taylor, "Clarissa Harlowe, Mary Astell, and Elizabeth Carter: John Norris of Bemerton's Female 'Descendants'", Eighteenth-Century Fiction 12 (Oct. 1999): 19–38.
- Krake, Astrid (2000). "How art produces art: Samuel Richardson's Clarissa". Spiegel ihrer deutschen Übersetzungen. Frankfurt: Peter Lang.
- Krake, Astrid (2006). "He could go no farther: The Rape of Clarissa in 18th-Century Translations". In Cointre, Annie; Lautel-Ribstein, Florence; Rivara, Annie (eds.). La traduction du discours amoureux (1660–1830). Metz: CETT. Archived from the original on 7 December 2010..
- Townsend, Alex, Autonomous Voices: An Exploration of Polyphony in the Novels of Samuel Richardson, 2003, Oxford, Bern, Berlin, Bruxelles, Frankfurt/M., New York, Wien, 2003, ISBN 978-3-906769-80-6, 978-0-8204-5917-2
- (in Chinese) Hou, Jian. "Haoqiu Zhuan yu Clarissa: Liangzhong shehui jiazhi de aiqing gushi" (A Tale of Chivalry and Love and Clarissa: romantic fiction based on two distinct social value systems), Zhongguo xiaoshuo bijiao yanjiu, pp. 95–116.
