= Samuel French, Inc. =

American theatrical publishing company

- Company type: Private
- Founded: 1830
- Headquarters: New York City
- Parent: Concord Music
- Website: www.concordtheatricals.com

Samuel French, Inc. is an American company founded by Samuel French and Thomas Hailes Lacy, who formed a partnership to combine their interests in London and New York City. It publishes plays, represents authors, and sells scripts from its Los Angeles, UK, and online bookstores. The company's London subsidiary, Samuel French Ltd., publishes stage plays for the UK market and serves as a licensing agent for performance rights, and runs a theatrical bookshop on its premises at Fitzrovia in central London.

The firm has offices in New York City, London, and Hollywood, California. The office in Toronto, Canada, was closed in 2007. In December 2018, Concord Music acquired Samuel French to form Concord Theatricals.

== History ==
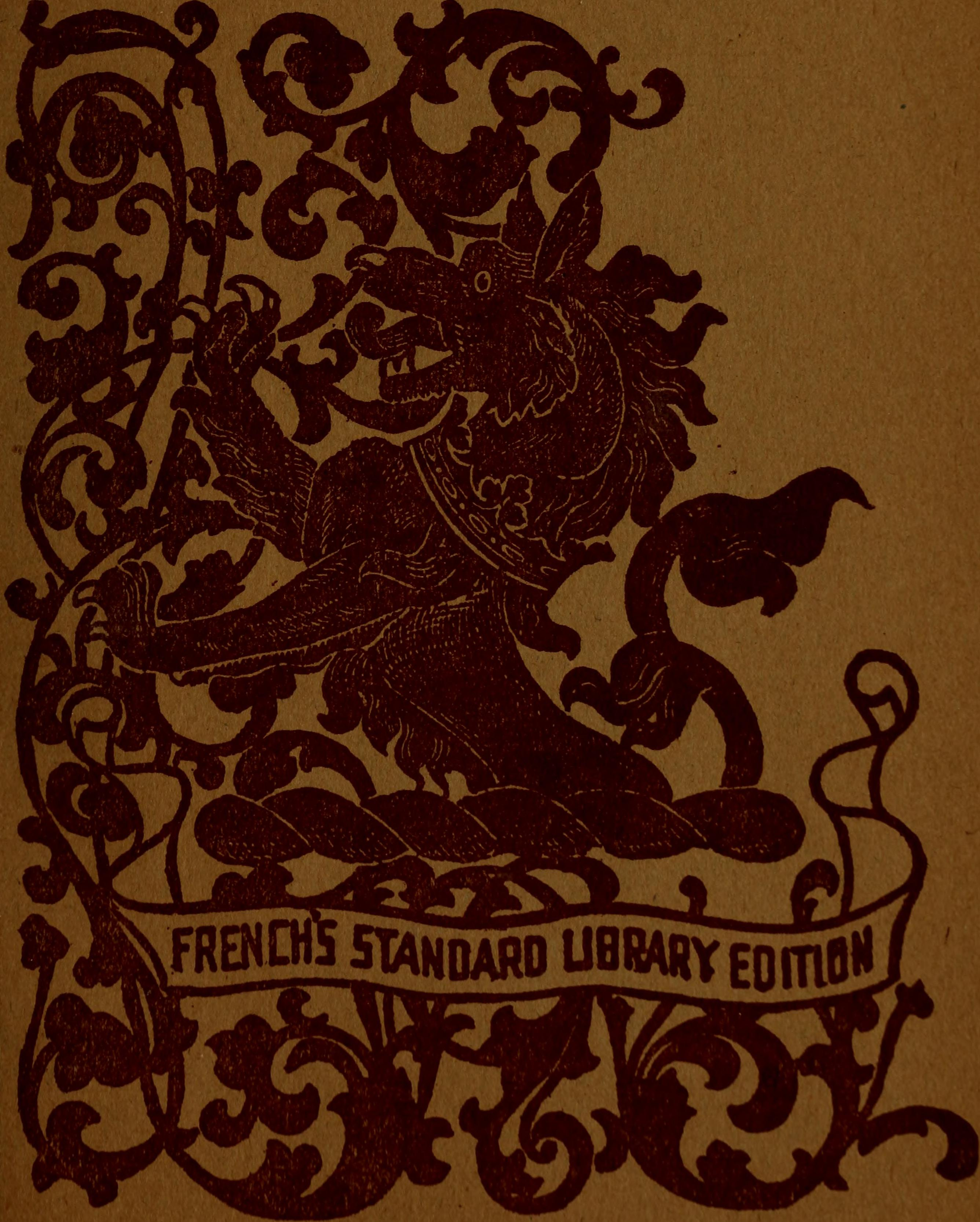
Samuel French, Inc. library edition of His Majesty, Bunker Bean

Samuel French was born in Massachusetts shortly after the turn of the 19th century, and began publishing French's American Drama in the mid-1800s in New York. French soon acquired a London dramatic publishing company founded by Thomas Hailes Lacy. French managed the London business while his son, Thomas Henry, took control of the New York operations.

In the late 1800s, Samuel French began publishing contemporary American dramas and making more plays available to Little Theatres. After the father and son died, the New York and London entities continued under their managing partners.

== Breaking Character ==
Samuel French publishes an online magazine entitled Breaking Character. On the site, staff members and guest authors write articles on publications, title spotlights, musical moments, staff picks, and playwright profiles. The magazine allows for interaction with the public.

== Off-Off-Broadway Short Play Festival ==
Samuel French's annual Off-Off-Broadway Short Play Festival (commonly referred to as OOB) takes place every summer in New York City. Playwrights from around the world submit their short plays for consideration, and 30 are chosen to participate. The festival takes place over a week, with four to eight plays being presented per night. Six are chosen as the winners, which are presented with publication and licensing rights. The festival has resulted in the publication of nearly 200 plays since its inception in 1975, including those by Sheila Callaghan, Theresa Rebeck, and Saviana Stanescu. In 2025, the festival celebrated its 50th year.

== Samuel French Limited ==
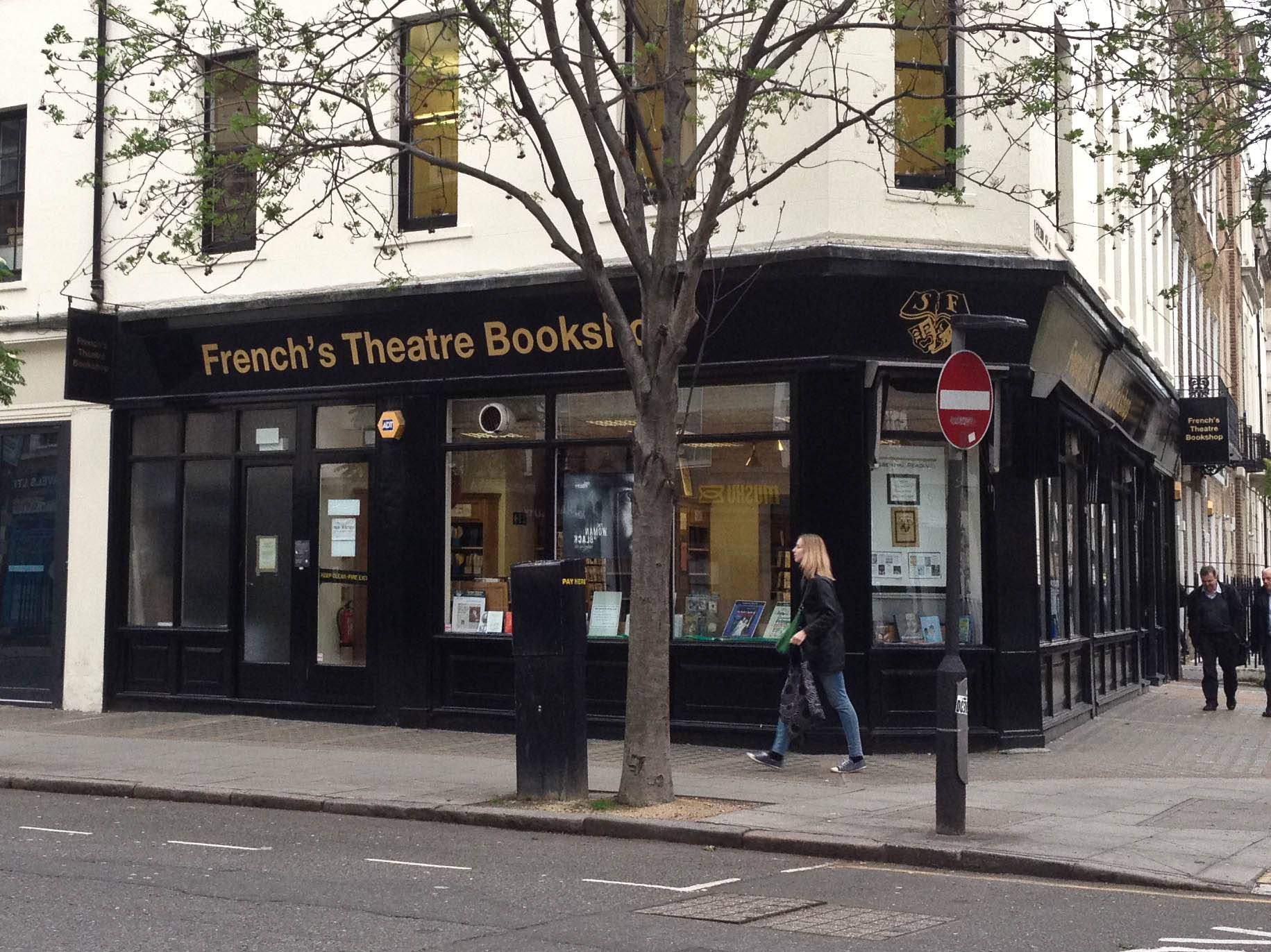
French's Theatre Bookshop

Samuel French Ltd. is the UK sister company of Samuel French, Inc. The company publishes stage plays for the UK market and serves as a licensing agent for performance rights. The theatrical bookshop at Fitzroy Street in London, closed in 2017. It was announced that they would be opening a bookshop inside the Royal Court Theatre in March 2018. The bookshop at the Royal Court Theatre closed permanently in July 2024, with Concord Theatricals donating the bookshop stock for the theatre to open a free reference library in its place.

The company was founded when Samuel French and Thomas Hailes Lacy formed a partnership in 1859, combining their existing interests in London and New York City.
