= David Osbaldiston =

Osbaldiston as Virginius, 1832

David Webster Osbaldiston (February 1794 – 29 December 1850) was an English actor of the first half of the nineteenth century. After playing as an amateur he turned professional and appeared in provincial companies in Truro, Plymouth, Bristol and Norwich before becoming a leading player in London theatres. As an actor-manager he ran five theatres during his career: the Surrey, Covent Garden, Sadler's Wells, the City of London in Bishopsgate and the Royal Victoria (now known as the Old Vic).

In addition to acting and managing theatres, Osbaldiston was the author of plays including Vive la liberté, or, The French Revolution of 1830 – an enthusiastic response to the July Revolution in Paris – which he revived eighteen years later to celebrate the French Revolution of 1848. Although he made much of his money from popular melodramas, he also raised funds for the Chartists and staged politically radical plays such as The Factory Lad (1832), which antedates by several years the major Victorian novels about industrial conditions.

He died at his London home aged 56, estranged from his wife, leaving most of his estate to his long-term partner, the actress Eliza Vincent.

== Life and career ==
=== Early years ===
David Webster Osbaldiston was born in Manchester, Lancashire, in February 1794, the son of William Osbaldiston – a local merchant – and Elizabeth, née Webster. Osbaldiston may have been intended for Oxford University and ordination in the Church of England, but he turned away from this career and in 1817 made his stage début as an amateur in a comedy by George Colman staged to raise money for local charities. He was first engaged professionally by a company in Derby, and towards the end of the decade he performed on the Plymouth circuit. In April 1819 he married the actress Harriet Elizabeth Coles Dawson in Exeter; they had four children.

In Truro in 1821, Osbaldiston and his wife appeared in the same stage company, under his management. and then moved to Bristol, where Osbaldiston's performance as Joseph Surface in The School for Scandal attracted praise: The Stage and Literary Cabinet commented:

This gentleman possesses many – indeed most of the requisites necessary to form a great actor; his figure is rather above the common size, and well proportioned; he has an open expressive countenance, and the best voice I remember to have heard—clear, distinct, energetic, and capable of the greatest modulation. His performance of the hypocritical villain obtained for him, what be justly deserved, repeated bursts of applause.

In 1822 Osbaldiston moved with his wife to the Theatre Royal, Norwich. There, his roles included Jacques in As You Like It and the title role in Richard III. According to Stephen Ridgwell in the Oxford Dictionary of National Biography, Osbaldiston earned a reputation as "an impressive actor, particularly gifted at portraying freedom-loving heroes" – examples were Rolla in Sheridan's Pizarro and the title character in James Sheridan Knowles's tragedy Virginius.

=== London ===
Osbaldiston made little impression in his first London appearance, in July 1826: The Times commented, "there is no offence about him, but at the same time he shows no qualifications which are likely to give him celebrity in London". In February 1828 he returned to London to join the Brunswick Theatre in Whitechapel. Three days after the opening of the theatre, its roof collapsed during a rehearsal, killing the proprietor, cast members and workmen. Osbaldiston escaped, having not yet arrived at the theatre. He was quickly engaged by an influential actor-manager, Robert Elliston, as a leading member of the company at the Surrey Theatre in Southwark. He made his début there in the title role of a dramatisation of Walter Scott's novel Rob Roy, and followed this with the title role in a free adaptation of Schiller's William Tell. The New Times reported that he "fully established the fame he had acquired on his first appearance. He is decidedly an acquisition to the theatre".

In addition to his leading roles, Osbaldiston wrote dramas, including Baron Trenck, or The Fortress of Magdebourg (1830) – which marked his final appearance at the Surrey under Elliston's management. – and Vive la liberté, or The French Revolution of 1830, an approving response to the July Revolution in Paris, "Embracing an historical outline of the memorable events of the Three Days".

Elliston died in 1831 and Osbaldiston raised 3,000 guineas to buy the lease of the Surrey, in partnership with Elliston's son. The two fell out and there was a long-running legal action between the two. As a trustee of the Surrey, Osbaldiston campaigned for an end to the patent house monopoly – a system dating from 1660 that granted three theatres – Drury Lane, Covent Garden and the Haymarket – the exclusive right to present spoken drama in London. In June 1832 he testified before a parliamentary committee on licensing and censorship reform. There was a majority in the House of Commons for a bill to abolish the monopoly, but the House of Lords rejected it. Osbaldiston defied the law and continued to present spoken drama; he was prosecuted, but the jury refused to convict him.

1830s productions by Osbaldiston

The Factory Lad, 1832

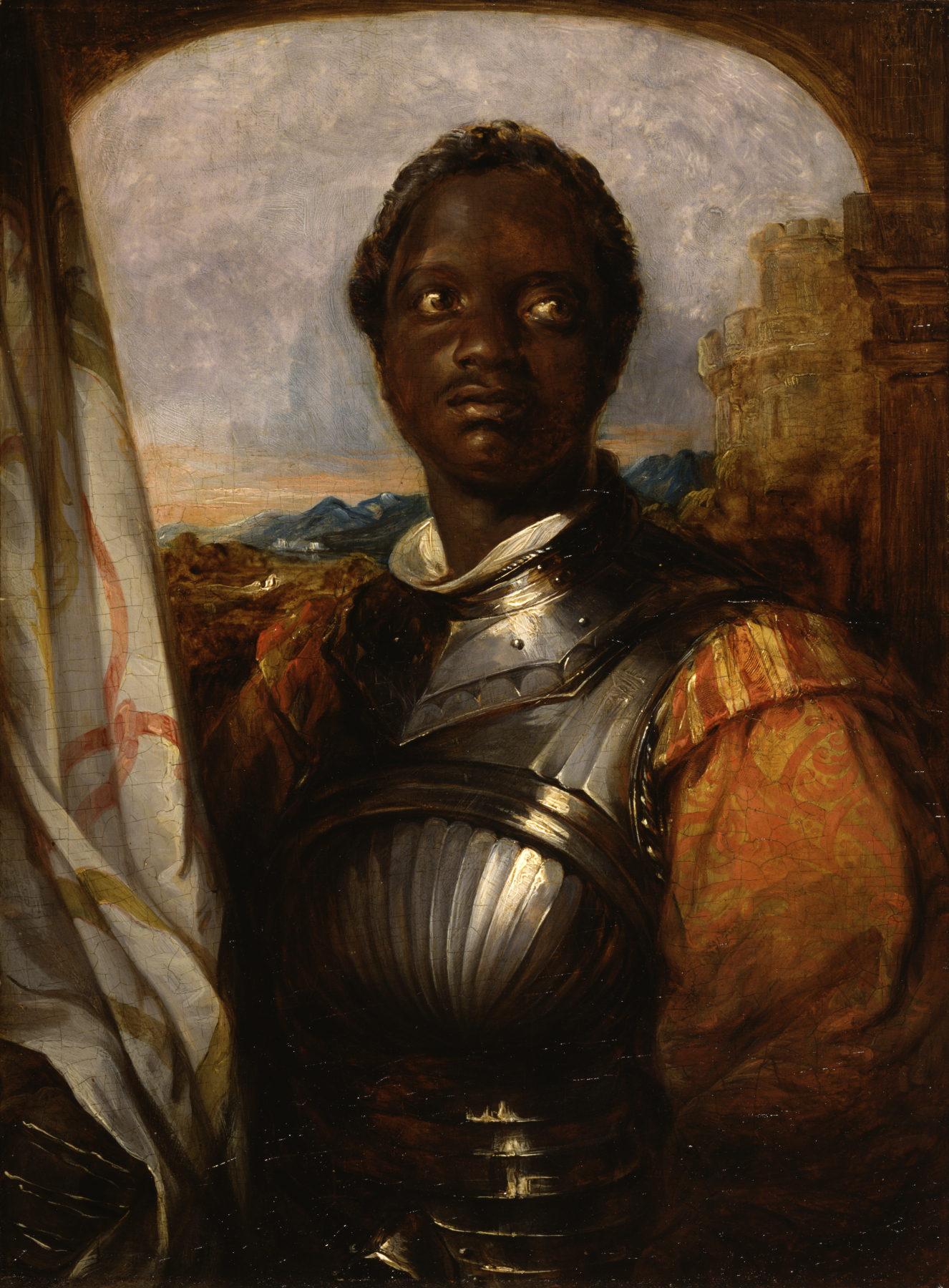
Ira Aldridge as Othello,

Osbaldiston again showed his radical character, presenting The Blight of Ambition, or, The Life of a Member of Parliament, and John Walker's combative melodrama The Factory Lad (1832), which The Stage later described as "the first social problem play in this genre", and which antedates by several years the major Victorian novels about industrial conditions, including Frances Trollope's Michael Armstrong, the Factory Boy (1840), Benjamin Disraeli's Sybyl (1845), and Elizabeth Gaskell's Mary Barton (1848).

Osbaldiston had a shrewd sense for the box office and presented the popular "African Roscius" (Ira Aldridge) as Othello in April 1833 and as Shylock the next month. In June of that year Osbaldiston staged and played the lead in Edward Fitzball's melodrama, Jonathan Bradford, or The Murder at the Roadside Inn. Also in the cast was the nineteen-year-old Eliza Vincent; the following year Vincent and Osbaldiston eloped. They had a daughter, Beatrice Eliza, and remained together for the rest of Osbaldiston's life.

=== Covent Garden and later ===
In September 1835 Osbaldiston became the manager at Covent Garden. Sparking outrage among the theatrical establishment, he reduced ticket prices drastically and introduced a mixed programme of straight dramas combined with populist entertainment, contributed by Fitzball. Charles Dickens derided him as a tawdry peddler of inferior plays, but Ridgwell comments that Osbaldiston played a key role in salvaging the career of Dickens's idol, William Macready, and in overseeing Charles Kemble's final and triumphant season of Shakespeare. He launched Helena Faucit's West End career, in Sheridan Knowles's The Hunchback and produced Edward Bulwer-Lytton's first staged play, the romantic tragedy The Duchess de la Vallière (1836). In 1836 Osbaldiston took over the management of Sadler's Wells Theatre in Islington, remaining simultaneously in charge at Covent Garden until March the following year.

Two years later Osbaldiston and Vincent moved to the new City of London Theatre in Bishopsgate, where they remained for three years. He made it one of the most successful small theatres in London. Ridgwell writes that although Osbaldiston continued to appear in his own productions – "mostly in heavyweight dramas" such as Colman's The Iron Chest and Thomas Otway's Venice Preserv'd – Vincent was increasingly the focus of a series of melodramas by George Dibdin Pitt.

Osbaldiston's last theatre, from Easter Monday 1841, was the Royal Victoria in Southwark (latterly better known as the Old Vic), which though potentially profitable was in need of revitalisation. He and Vincent had an early success with Simon Lee, or The Murder at the Five Fields Copse, in which a loving wife poisons herself in the cell where her husband awaits execution and a reprieve arrives just as she is at the point of death. They had a still greater success with Dibdin Pitt's Susan Hopley, or, The Vicissitudes of a Servant Girl, which according to Ridgwell "reportedly had audiences offering help to the beleaguered heroine". But although sentimental melodramas were profitable, Osbaldiston's "People's Theatre" also had a more radical side. As well as Chartist fund-raising evenings the theatre hosted plays with a strong political element, including Richard Plantagenet, or The Rebellion of Wat Tyler by J. T. Haines and The Soldier's Progress, or The Horrors of War by John Courtney. In response to the revolutionary wave of 1848, Osbaldiston revived Vive la liberté and concluded it with the "Marseillaise".

Osbaldiston died of jaundice and dropsy at his home in Brixton on 29 December 1850, aged 56. His estranged wife strongly contested his will, but most of his estate, including the lease of the Victoria, went, as he wished, to Vincent.

== Sources ==
- Ledger, Edward, ed. (1869). The Era Almanack and Annual. London: The Era. OCLC 1049052455.
- Vernon, Sally (Winter 1977). "Trouble up at t'Mill: The Rise and Decline of the Factory Play in the 1830s and 1840s". Victorian Studies. 20 (2): 117–139. (subscription required)
