= Master Herbert =

19th-century English actor

- Born: 22 December 1822; Wisbech, Isle of Ely, England
- Occupation: Actor
- Years active: 1827 to c1830
- Father: John Herbert

Master Herbert (born 1822) was an English child actor.

'Master Herbert' also known as the 'Infant Roscius' Henry Herbert (1822-?) born 22 December, in Wisbech, the son of John Herbert (a member of Wisbech Harmonic Society). He was taken to the theatre at the age of two.

The family moved to London, where he watched Edmund Kean perform. The family relocated to Reading, where he saw another juvenile Roscius, Master Grossmith perform. George Dibdin Pitt of the Surrey theatre wrote a suitable piece Peter Proteus; or How to gain five thousand pounds for the young actor. His first performance was at Watford. He performed at Reading reciting a comic piece in The Star Struck Sailor and the song 'Barney Brannigan'. He also returned to Wisbech to perform at what is now the Angles Theatre in 1829. From Wisbech he was to perform at the George and Star Inn, Whittlesey on 1 September and then Peterborough, Thorney, March, Long Sutton and Holbeach. In December 1829 he appeared at Norwich for three nights and at Holkham Hall before going to Aylsham. In 1830 he performed in Beverley, Bridlington, York, Scarborough, Knareborough, Richmond, Pontefract and at Leeds in December. In April 1831 he performed Peter Proteus! At the Royal Pavilion Theatre. He performed as Briefwit in The Weathercock at Chelmsford theatre on 23 August 1833. In December he appeared at Huntingdon and received much applause. A return visit was made to Wisbech during the Mart before moving to neighbouring towns.
