= The Luxe Cinema =

Cinema in Wisbech, England

Luxe Cinema
- The Luxe
- Interactive map of the Luxe Cinema area

General information
- Location: Wisbech, United Kingdom, Alexandra Road, Wisbech, Cambs. PE13 1HQ, Wisbech, United Kingdom
- Coordinates: 52.6633°N 0.1591°E
- Renovated: 2019
- Owner: Picturedrome Electric Theatre Company Ltd.

Website
- www.wisbechcinema.com

The Luxe Cinema is a cinema in Wisbech, Isle of Ely, Cambridgeshire, England.

== History ==
The cinema is located in Alexandra Road, this Road also is the location of the Angles Theatre, and the former Selwyn Theatre. Along with the Wisbech & Fenland Museum, Wisbech Library, Wisbech Castle, St. Peters Church, hall & gardens and The Crescent this area of the town constitutes the 'Cultural Quarter'.

The Luxe cinema was converted from a redundant Women's Institute Hall and opened in March, 2009 styled as a luxury cinema with leather armchairs and two-seater sofas, and ‘premier’ sofas with service. It has a licensed bar. The Women's Institute branch now (2019) meets in the Rosmini Centre, Queens Road.

The town's last operating cinema the 'Unit One' (previously The Hippodrome) had been demolished in the 1980s to make way for the Horsefair shopping centre development that opened in 1988.

On 23 May 2014 an eight-screen cinema was opened near the new Tesco store, Cromwell Road by The Light Cinemas chain.

The Luxe was part of 'The Brinks Festival 2015' hosting 'The Secret World of Charles Darwin' by Magic Circle Comedy Award winner Ian Keebler on Monday 18 May.

In 2015 The Goob an award winning Independent film shot across the Fens, was shown followed by an audience question and answer session with film director Guy Myhill and Martin Ferguson.

In 2016 Leverington Primary Academy pupils created animated films as part of the children's arts award with Trinity House to achieve the Gold Standard and attended the official screening in June 2016.

Currently a single screen cinema, ownership changed in August 2017. Becoming part of the Picturedrome cinema group alongside cinemas in Blackwood, Bognor Regis, Clacton on Sea, Devizes, Dorchester, Wednesbury and Westgate on Sea.

In October 2018 the digitally remastered vintage war footage film They Shall Not Grow Old was shown in the run up to the 100th anniversary of WW1.

In March 2019 the cinema launched 'Wisbech: Made in Minecraft', the town brought to virtual life by Bunny Schindler and Adam Clarke. (https://github.com/collusion-org-uk/minecraft-wisbech)

The cinemas also functions as an arts centre. It has hosted groups including a games club, the poetry group Wisbech Stanza and the Friends of Wisbech & Fenland Museum.
