= Surrey Theatre =

Former theatre in London

- Davidge's Royal Surrey; Theatre Royal Circus; Royal Surrey Theatre; Surrey Vaudeville Theatre; Surrey Theatre of Varieties
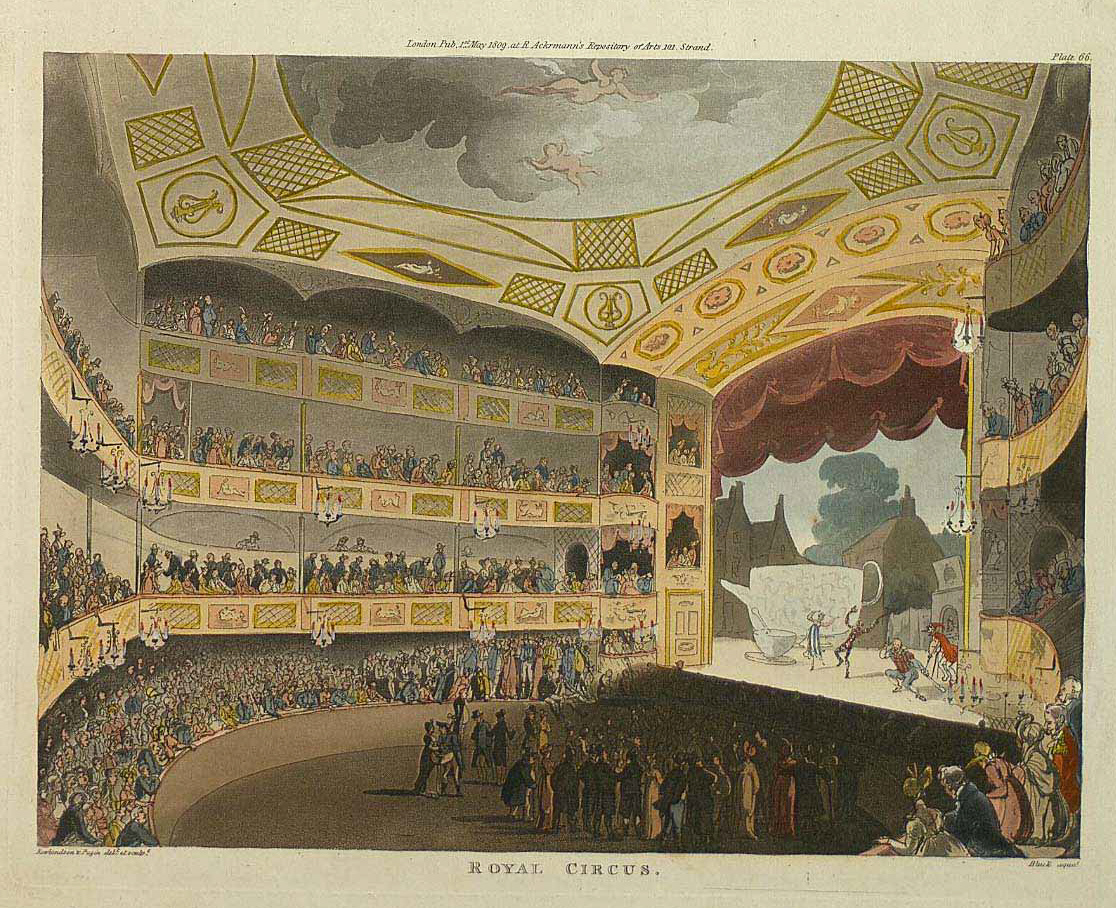
- Royal Circus
- Interactive map of Surrey Theatre
- Address: Blackfriars Road, Southwark; London
- Coordinates: 51.499°N 0.105°W
- Capacity: 1865 2,161 in four tiers
- Designation: Demolished 1934
- Current use: Site occupied by modern flats

Construction
- Rebuilt: 1800 Rudolphe Carbanel; 1806 Rudolphe Carbanel; 1865 John Ellis; 1904 Kirk and Kirk
- Years active: 1782–1924
- Architect: Unknown

The Surrey Theatre, London began life in 1782 as the Royal Circus and Equestrian Philharmonic Academy, one of the many circuses that provided entertainment of both horsemanship and drama (hippodrama). It stood in Blackfriars Road, near the junction with Westminster Bridge Road, just south of the River Thames in what is now the London Borough of Southwark.

== History ==
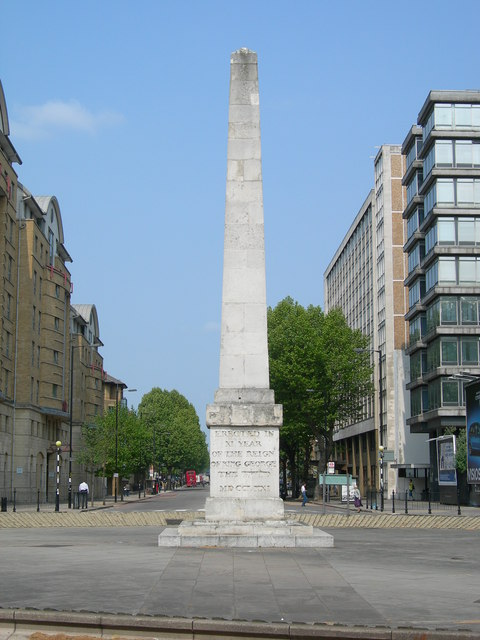
The theatre stood near to the St George's Circus road junction.

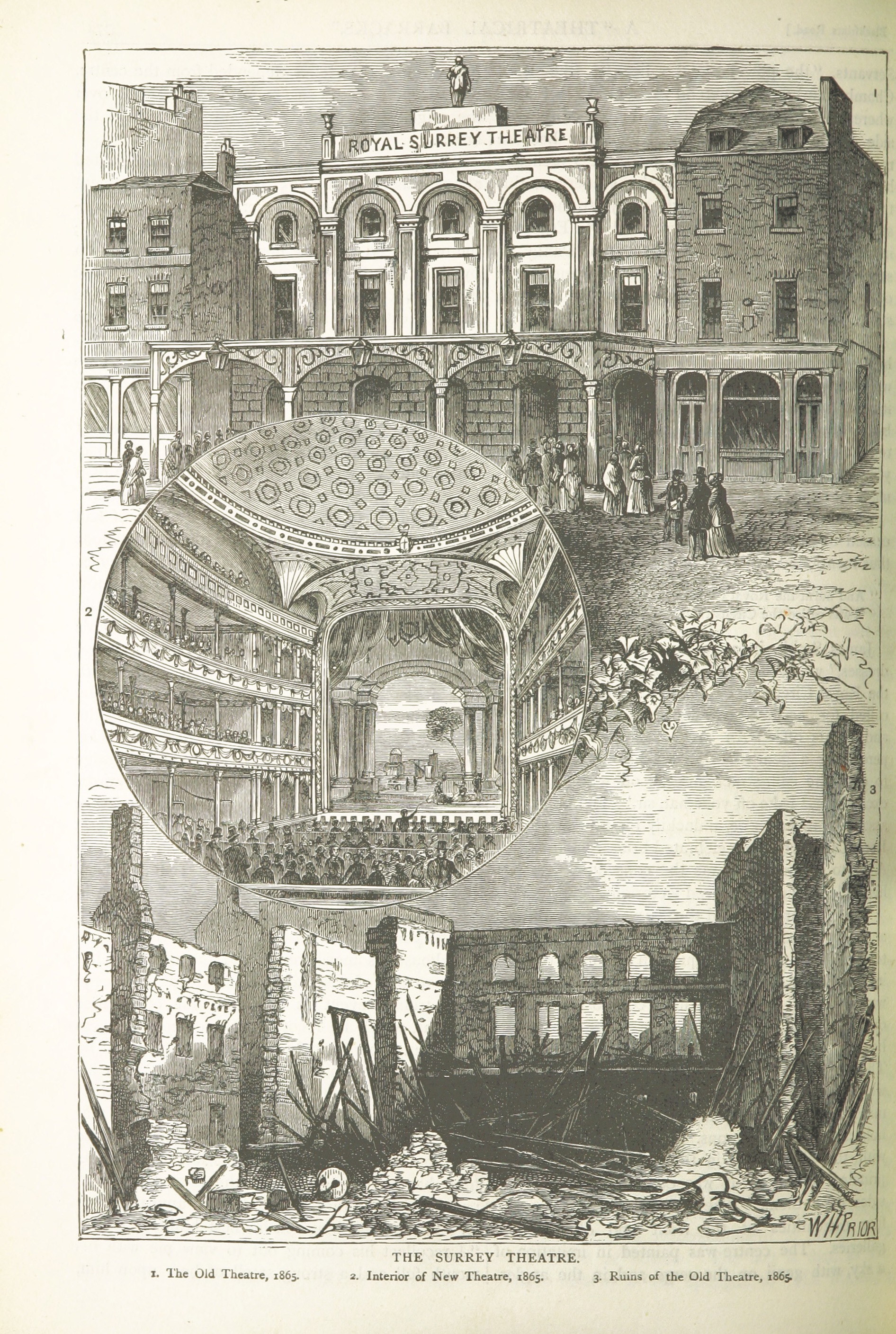
Surrey Theatre, 1865 and before

The Royal Circus was opened on 4 November 1782 by the composer and songwriter, Charles Dibdin (who coined the term "circus" for that usage), aided by Charles Hughes, a well-known equestrian performer. The entertainments were at first performed by children with the goal of its being a nursery for young actors. Delphini, a celebrated buffo, became manager in 1788 and produced a spectacle including a real stag-hunt. Other animal acts followed, including the popular dog act Gelert and Victor, lecture pieces, pantomimes and local spectacles. The popular comedian John Palmer then managed the theatre until 1789, when he was committed to Horsemonger Lane Gaol as "a rogue and a vagabond".

It continued in use until 1810, although it had a troubled existence, being burnt down in 1799 and again on 12 August 1805. Rebuilt in 1806 by the German architect of the Old Vic, Rudolph Cabanel, it was converted into a theatre by Robert Elliston. He renamed it the Surrey Theatre, being determined to perform Shakespeare and other plays. He reopened on Easter Monday and to avoid trouble with the law, which did not allow dialogue to be spoken without musical accompaniment except at the two patent theatres, he put a ballet into every such production, including Macbeth, Hamlet, and Farquhar's The Beaux' Stratagem. Contemporary reviewers noted that the Lambeth streets teemed with prostitutes. Elliston left in 1814, and the Surrey became a circus again until Thomas Dibdin reopened it as a theatre in 1816. The arena where the equestrian exercises had been displayed was converted into a large pit for spectators, and the stables became saloons. Fanny Fitzwilliam and Sally Brook starred in melodramas, but the theatre had little success overall. John Baldwin Buckstone made his first London appearance at the theatre, on 30 January 1823, as Ramsay in The Fortunes of Nigel. George Holland also appeared at the theatre, in 1826.

When Elliston returned in 1827, the theatre's fortunes changed. In 1829, Douglas Jerrold's melodrama Black-Eyed Susan, with T. P. Cooke as William, the nautical hero, ran for over 300 nights, which was extraordinarily successful for the time. Elliston made his last appearance at this theatre on 24 June 1831, twelve days before he died. David Osbaldiston then took over and, among other plays, produced Edward Fitzball's Jonathan Bradford; or, the Murder at the Roadside Inn, which ran for 260 nights. Productions of Dickens dramas, among others, followed. Ira Aldridge, the first successful black actor, appeared here in the 1840s. C. Z. Barnett's adaptation, A Christmas Carol; or, The Miser's Warning played in 1844. Richard Shepherd, who succeeded Alfred Bunn in 1848, remained at the theatre until 1869 and established its reputation for 'rough-and-tumble' transpontine melodrama.

On 29 January 1865, during the last scene of the pantomime Richard Coeur de Lion, a fire began above the chandelier. The audience evacuated safely, but before the cast could leave the entire theatre was plunged into darkness, as the gas supervisor cut the gas supply to prevent an explosion. Panic ensued backstage, but the cast were led to safety through the burning scenery by the efforts of Green (acting manager), Rowella (the 'clown'), Evans (the 'pantaloon'), Vivian (the 'sprite') and others. The cast, still in their flimsy stage clothes, were conveyed to their lodgings in a fleet of cabs, provided by the police. In less than ten minutes the interior was ablaze, and the theatre was burnt down shortly after midnight.

A new theatre, designed by John Ellis, seating 2,161 people in four tiers, opened on 26 December 1865. Little of note took place until 1881, when George Conquest took over, staging melodramas, many of them written by himself, and pantomimes.

The Surrey flourished until his death in 1901. For a time during the war and after it hosted the Fairbairn Opera Company, claimed to be the first subsidised opera company. The theatre was remodelled by Kirk and Kirk, as a music hall, but did not prosper, becoming a cinema in 1920. It finally closed in 1924, and the building was demolished in 1934. The site is now occupied by modern flats.
