= Eliza Ann Vincent =

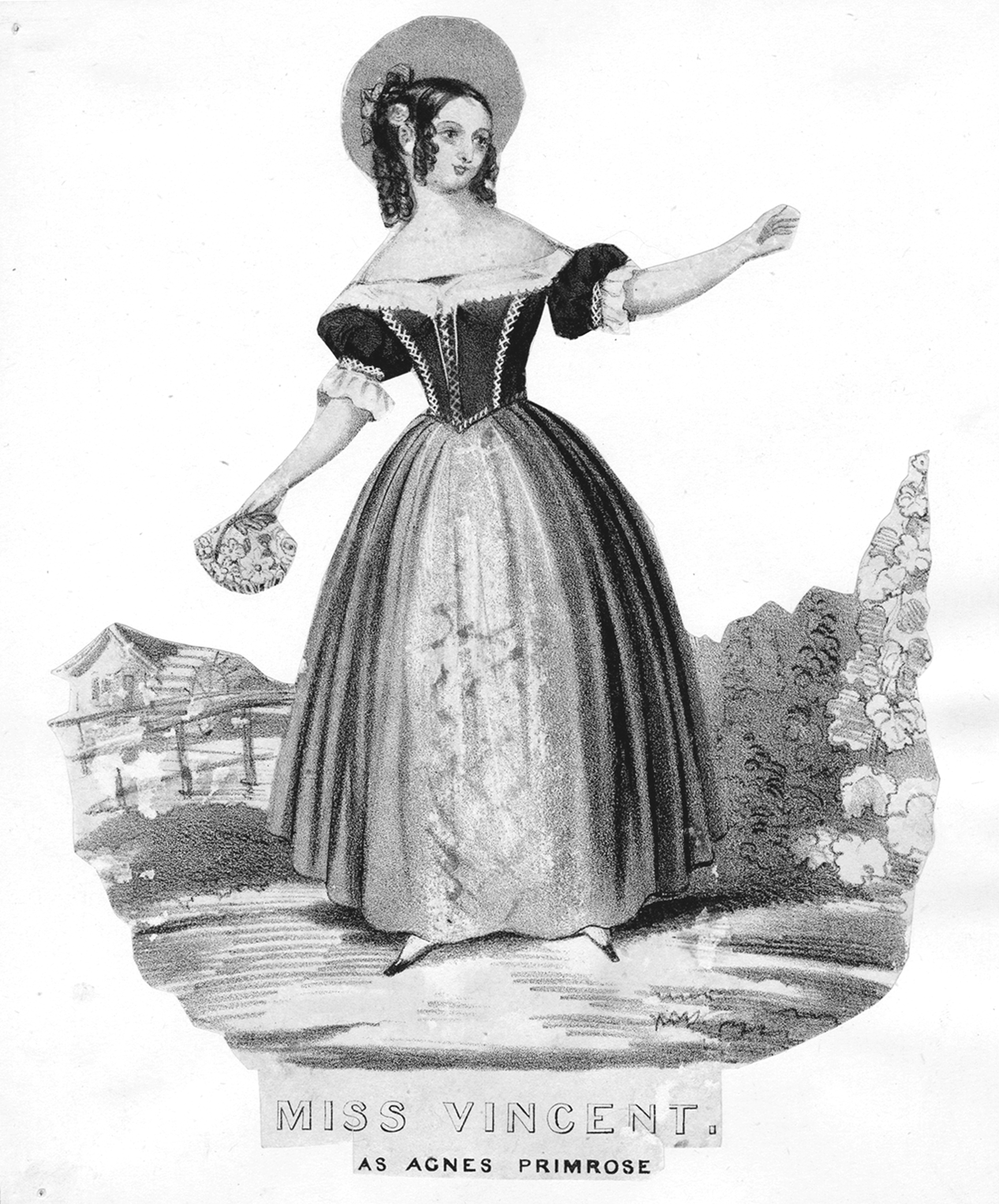
- by Agnes Princess
- Born: 1 April 1815; Southwark
- Died: 10 November 1856 (aged 41); Lambeth
- Occupations: theatre manager and actress
- Known for: managing the success of the Royal Victoria Theatre
- Partner: David Osbaldiston

Eliza Ann Vincent or Miss Vincent (1 April 1815 – 10 November 1856) was a British actress and theatre manager

== Life ==
Vincent was born in Southwark in 1815. Her parents were Ann and Philip Vincent and her father sold the news. Vincent became a child star after her first appearance in 1821 in George Dibdin Pitt's play The Ruffian Boy at the Surrey Theatre.

Robert William Ellison who was the Actor/Manager at the Drury Lane Theatre, and he persuaded her change her allegiance. For three seasons she played a repertoire that included a Shakespeare play, a musical and the boy part of Little Pickles in The Spoiled Child. She played boys and throughout her career she took on breeches parts.

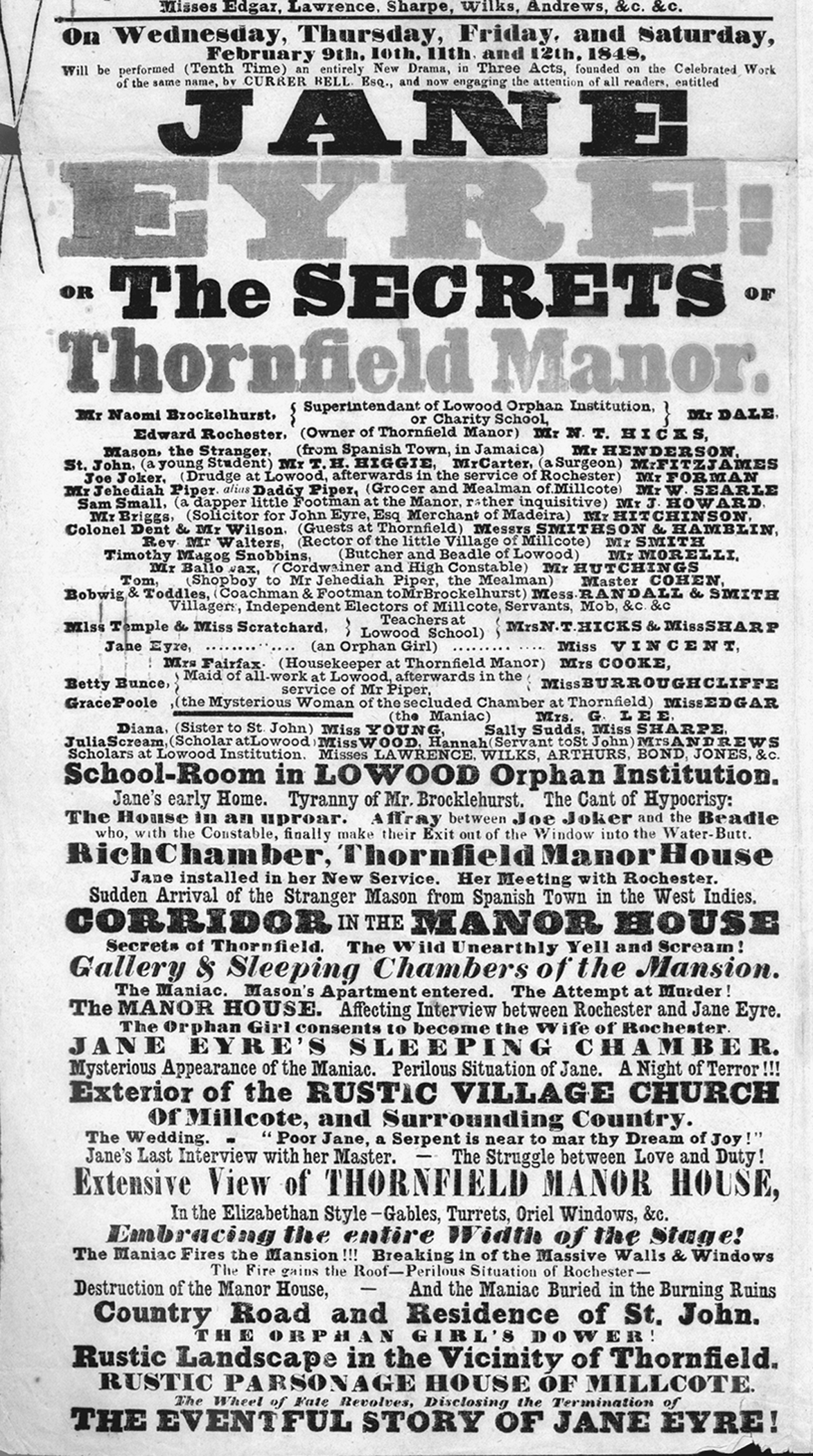
Jane Eyre at the Old Vic in 1848 starring Miss Vincent

From 1841, George Dibdin Pitt's play, Susan Hopley had a long-running success at the Royal Victoria Theatre. Susan Hopley; or, The Vicissitudes of a Servant Girl, adapted from the novel Adventures of Susan Hopley; or, Circumstantial Evidence by Catherine Crowe. Vincent was in the title role, she still backed Dibdin Pitt's work. She and the theatre achieved great success with this play which lasted a decade. By 1849, it had been performed 343 times.

In 1841, David Osbaldiston who was Vincent's lover took over as lessee of The Old Vic. In 1848 the theatre put on the first dramatization of Jane Eyre by Currer Bell (Charlotte Brontë) with Miss Vincent in the title role on February 9-12th. Osbaldiston was succeeded on his death in 1850 by Vincent who was still the theatre's leading lady. The theatre remained devoted to melodrama. In 1858, sixteen people were crushed to death inside the theatre after mass panic caused after an actor's clothing caught fire.

Vincent died in 1856 in Lambeth.

== Private life ==
She never married and retained her name throughout her career.
