= Harriet Pitt =

British actress and dancer

- Born: 12 October 1748; Richmond, Surrey, England
- Died: 10 December 1814 (aged 66)
- Known for: actress and mother to an acting family
- Partner: Charles Dibdin

Harriet Pitt (12 October 1748 – 10 December 1814) was a British actress and dancer. She was often credited as Mrs Davenett later in her career.

== Life ==
Pitt was born to Ann Pitt who was an actress. In 1758 she was appearing doing recitations. The theatrical career did not involve major parts but she did appear at the Drury Lane Theatre and the Covent Garden Theatre.

Her first child was George Cecil Pitt (baptised 1767 – 1820), fathered by George Anderson. George Cecil Pitt became a musician and was the father of the dramatist George Dibdin Pitt, who as a young man took Dibdin as his middle name in honour of his uncles, Harriet's later sons.

She established a relationship with Charles Dibdin who already had a family and together they had four children. The eldest was the songwriter Charles Isaac Mungo Dibdin who was born in 1768. The next, a daughter, Harriott, was born in 1770 and died in infancy. Another son and songwriter was Thomas John Dibdin who was born in 1771. A second daughter, known also as Harriet Pitt (1772-1836) became an actress at Saddler's Wells.

Harriet gave birth to Charles in Russell Court, Covent Garden, he was named after his father's librettist Isaac Bickerstaffe and their character Mungo in an afterpiece entitled The Padlock. Charles Dibdin made his theatrical debut opposite his younger brother Thomas John Dibdin in David Garrick's The Jubilee in 1775. Soon after this performance, his parents separated, and Charles changed his surname to Pitt. David Garrick was Thomas's godfather and he looked after the family when the elder Charles Dibdin abandoned this family too. Harriet entrusted the upbringing of her children to her uncle, Cecil Pitt, and he sent both boys away to a boarding school at Barnard Castle. The school kept them there even during the holidays and Thomas did not return for five years.

Harriet appeared at the Drury Lane Theatre in the 1770s as she started to use the name "Mrs Davenett". Still using this new name she obtained regular work at the Covent Garden during most of the 1780s and until 1793.

Pitt retired in 1793 and she was buried, with her mother, in 1814.
