= The Wisbech Players =

English theatre group

- Formation: 1954
- Type: Amateur Theatre Group
- Headquarters: Angles Theatre
- Official language: English
- Website: wisbechplayers.org.uk

The Wisbech Players is an amateur theatre group based in Wisbech, Isle of Ely. The Players' aim is to offer a broad base of productions, usually two or three per year. The society is affiliated to the National Operatic and Dramatic Association (NODA) and Fenland Arts.

== History ==
In the 1940s Sheila Chesters, the wife of the Wisbech Grammar School headmaster, started to run dancing classes for girls in the School gardens. From this strand developed a junior theatre group. In the 1950s Sheila Chesters, then chair of the County Music Committee, was asked to form a children's choir. The group attended the Eistedfodd in Llangollen. Chesters scoured the area seeking out old folk songs, some of which appear never to have been printed.

The Wisbech Players was founded in 1954 through the break up of the Wisbech Little Theatre drama group run by Chesters, who was also busy running the children's choir competing at King's Lynn Festival, Albert Hall, Edinburgh and Aldeburgh.

The society's production of A Hundred Years Old, by S & J Quintero took place at the Women's Institute Hall (since 2009 The Luxe Cinema).

Two productions per year were put on most years once the society was established. This was eventually reduced to one.

The productions at the turn of the century were Arsenic and Old Lace by Joseph Kesselring and 'Allo 'Allo! based on the tv series by Jeremy Lloyd and David Croft.

== 21st century ==
For the fiftieth anniversary in 2004, Joan Littlewood's Oh, What a Lovely War! was put on at the Georgian Angles Theatre.

The society returned to two productions in 2007 with Rebecca and Steel Magnolias.

Far from the Madding Crowd by Thomas Hardy and adapted by playwright Jessica Swale was the 2018 spring play.

In 2019 Ladies in Lavender directed by Barbara Mews and adapted for the stage by Shaun McKenna was the Spring production performed at the Angles.

The spring 2019 production was Cheshire Cats by Gail Young, which raised £285 for the Breast Care Unit at The Queen Elizabeth Hospital, King's Lynn, followed by the autumn production of A Bunch of Amateurs, written by Ian Hislop and Nick Newman for a cast of seven.
