= John Inigo Richards =

British painter (1731–1810)

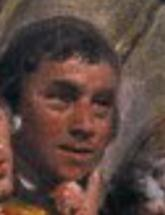
John Inigo Richards in the group portrait The Academicians of the Royal Academy by Zoffany

John Inigo Richards RA (1731– 18 December 1810) was a British landscapist who became one of the founding members of the Royal Academy in 1768, and was secretary to the Academy from 1788 until his death.

== Life ==
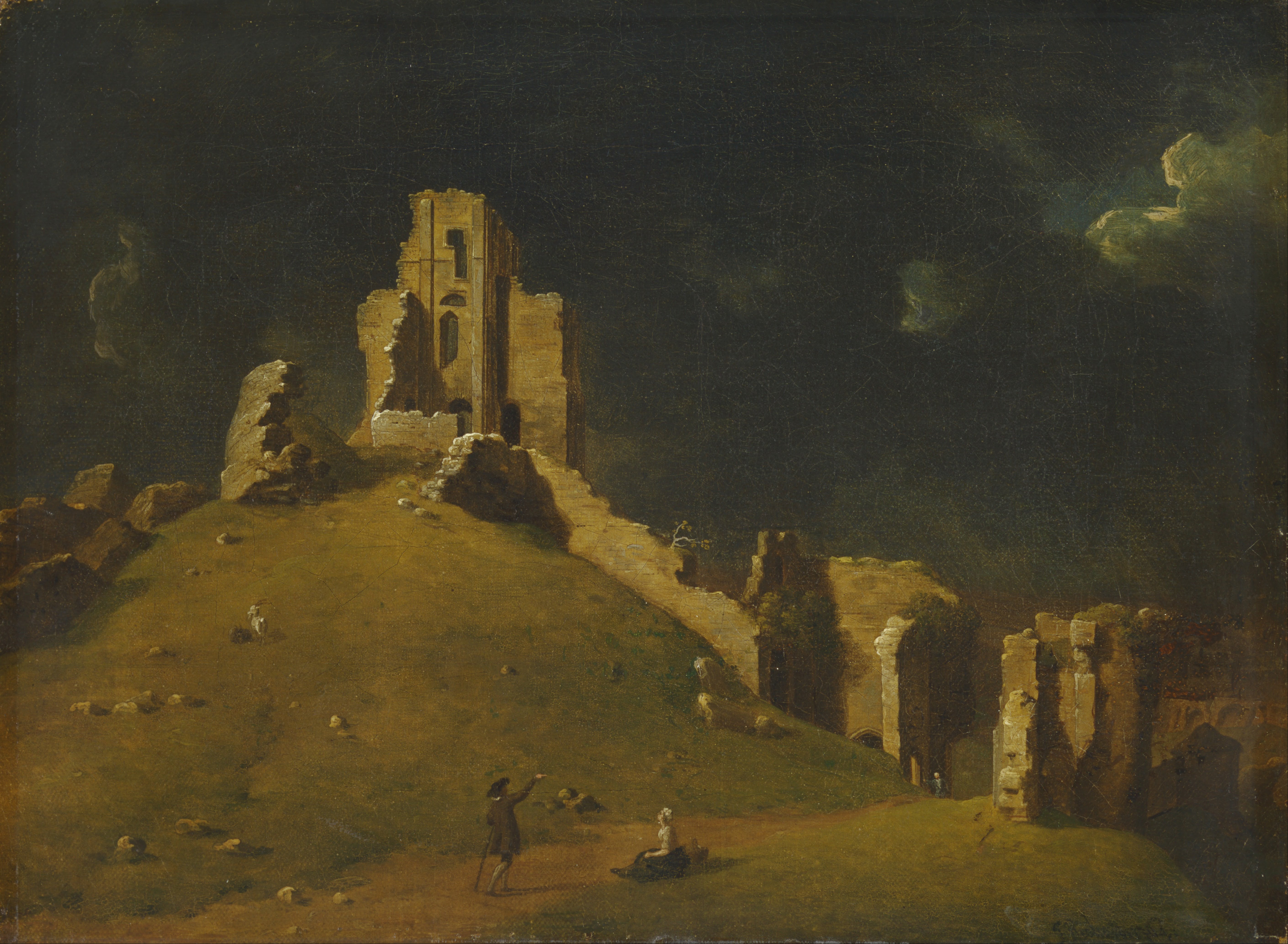
Corfe Castle, Dorset by John Inigo Richards (Yale Center for British Art)

He studied art at the St Martin's Lane Academy in London, where he was a pupil of George Lambert (1700–1765), sometimes regarded as the "Father of English Landscape Oil Painting".

Like his contemporary Francis Hayman, Richards worked as a scene painter in London's theatres (1777–1803). He retained a lifelong interest in theatre design. He is credited with the design of the Chestnut Street Theatre in Philadelphia. (America's first purpose-built professional theatre, opening in 1793), built for his brother-in-law Thomas Wignell.

When Richards died in 1810 he acknowledged that Mary Ann Ritchards who had been born to the actress Ann Pitt in 1759 was his daughter. He left her a snuff box which was decorated with a picture of her mother and his former lover.
