= John Courtney (playwright) =

19th-century English playwright, dramatic actor, and comedian

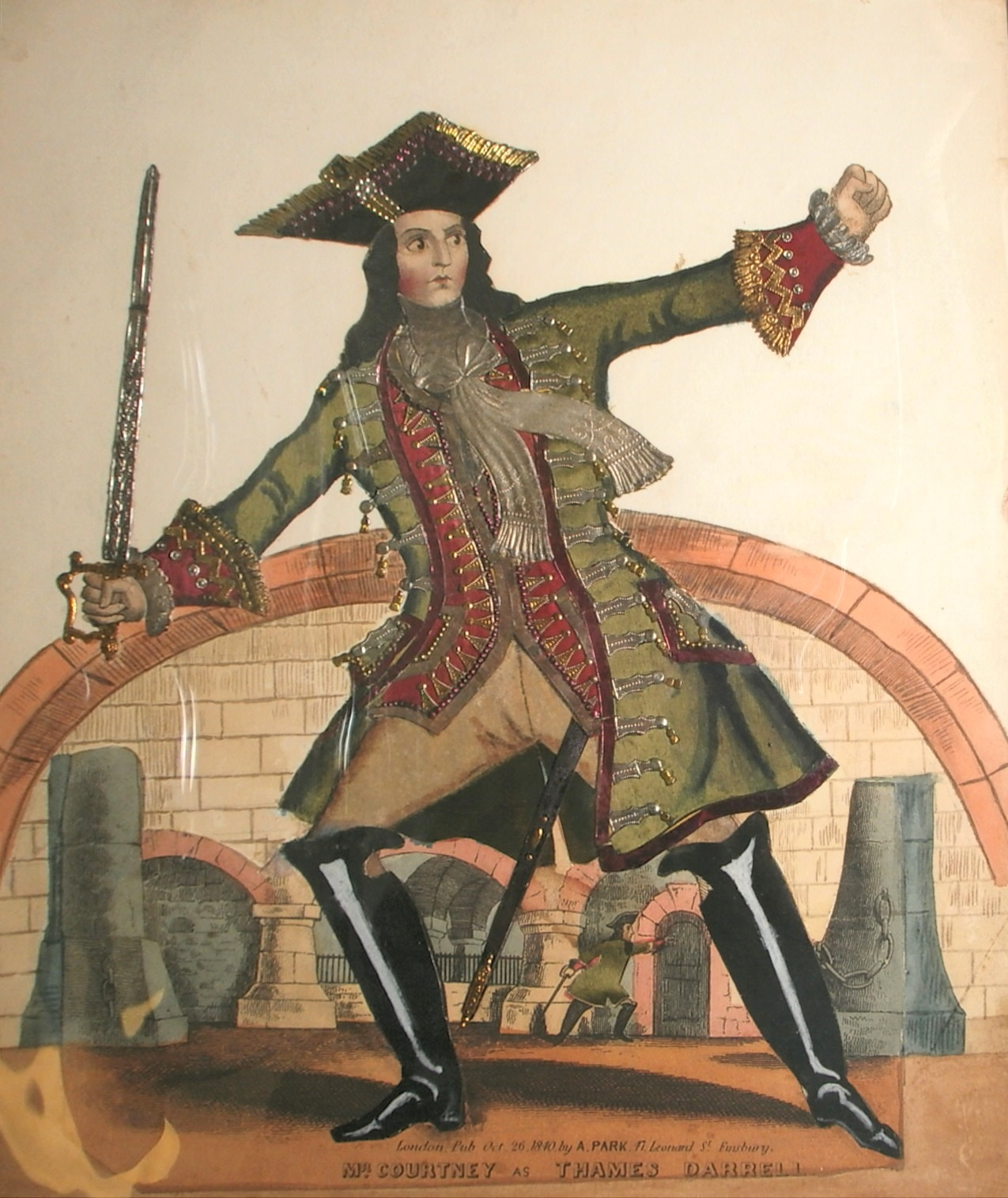
- John Courtney as Thames Darrell 1840
- Born: John Fuller; 29 August 1804; St James's, Westminster, London, England
- Died: 17 February 1865 (aged 60); Camberwell, London, England
- Occupations: Playwright, actor, comedian
- Spouse: Elizabeth Ann Norman
- Children: John Fuller Courtney; Albert Fuller Courtney; Rose Helena Courtney; Louise Marian Courtney; Emily Courtney; Clara Courtney; Alice Courtney

John Courtney (1804–1865) was a Victorian playwright, dramatic actor, and comedian. Courtney was the stage name of John Fuller. He wrote over 60 plays, including the popular dramas Time Tries All first performed in 1848, which attained great success around the UK and also in the US from the 1850s to at least the 1880s, and Eustice Baudin (1854), which attained even greater success in the USA through to at least the 1890s. He wrote the first theatrical adaptation of Charlotte Brontë's novel Jane Eyre (1848) which was rediscovered in 2009. One of his early acting performances was in 1829 as Colonel Freelove in The Day after the Wedding or A Wife's First Lesson adapted by Maria Theresa Kemble from the original French comedy.

== Life and work ==
John Courtney was born at St James’s, Westminster on 29 August 1804 as John Fuller but when he became an actor he wished to be known as John Courtney and this was the name he used throughout his life. His death certificate records him as "John Fuller otherwise Courtney" and his descendants have all been Courtneys. He worked as an actor on the London stage between 1829 and 1862. In 1848 Courtney wrote a stage adaptation of Jane Eyre titled Jane Eyre or The Secrets of Thornfield Manor, which was shown at the Victoria Theatre. In 1850 he was employed as a "stock author" for £2 per week by Mr Shepherd of the Surrey Theatre. In 1852 he received expenses for a visit to Paris for the sole purpose of spotting suitable plays for adaptation, for example Old Joe and Young Joe. According to The Era, the dramatic and music hall newspaper of the time:

he was originally intended for a commercial life, but his love for the Drama speedily changed the directions of his pursuits. For some years he was a light comedian at the Birmingham and other country Theatres, and in 1840 he was engaged by Mr Rouse at the Grecian Saloon. Though he never entirely gave up the Stage as a profession, having been a member of the Haymarket company up to the time of his decease, it will as an industrious playwright for the minor Theatres that his name will be most familiar to the public. For the Surrey and Victoria Theatres he wrote a considerable number of pieces, and his very interesting and original drama of Time Tries All, produced at the Olympic Theatre in 1849, remains one of the most popular products of his industrious pen.

He died on February 17, 1865, at Camberwell and is buried at Camberwell Old Cemetery, London.

== Personal life ==
Courtney married Elizabeth Ann Norman (b. 1821), with whom he had several children: John Fuller Courtney (b. 1847), Albert Fuller Courtney (1851-1907), Rose Helena Courtney (b. 1857), Louise Marian Courtney (b. 1859), Emily Courtney (b. 1860), Clara Courtney (b. 1862), and Alice Courtney (b. 1863).

== Stage performances ==
John Courtney appeared on stage as Colonel Freelove in 1829 in the comedy The Day after the Wedding, or A Wife's First Lesson by Maria Theresa Kemble. He played Thames Darrell (1840) in Jack Sheppard a play by John Buckstone based on the novel of the same name by William Harrison Ainsworth first performed at the Adelphi Theatre in 1839. It was a historical romance and a Newgate novel based on the real life of the 18th-century criminal Jack Sheppard. He played Julio in the William Macready production of Othello at the Italian Opera House, Paris in December 1844. He played Sir Agrovaine in The Three Perils of Man by James Hogg at the Surrey Theatre in 1852. He played Gaylove in The Hunchback by James Sheridan Knowles at Windsor Castle attended by Queen Victoria and Lord Palmerston, Prime Minister on 11 January 1860. He also played this part at the performances at the Theatre Royal, Haymarket 13–15 February 1860. He played Captain Peppercoat in The Flying Dutchman and appeared in performances of Macbeth and the Corsicans.

== Plays written by John Courtney ==
Type	Title	Where first performed	Notes
Drama	The Spirit of the Fountain	Princess's Theatre 1843	
Farce	Bounce or The Ojibbeway Indians or American Indians	Princess's Theatre Feb 1844	
Farce	Aged Forty	Princess's Theatre Feb 1844	
Farce	Taken by Surprise	Princess's Theatre June 1844	
Drama	Vanity	The Grecian Theatre 1844	
Drama	The Sisters of Chatillon or A Father's Retribution	Surrey Theatre Nov 1844	
Drama	The Bride's Journey or The Escapes of Adelaide of Dresden	Royal Victoria Theatre (The Old Vic) Apr 1846	
Drama	The Day Dream or The Heart's Ordeal	City of London Theatre, Bishopsgate Aug 1846	
Drama	Clarissa Harlowe	Princess's Theatre Sept 1846	
Drama	The Marchioness of Brinvilliers	Royal Victoria Theatre (The Old Vic) 1846	
Drama	The Cook of Kennington or No Followers Allowed	Royal Victoria Theatre (The Old Vic) 1846	
Drama	The Gunsmith of Orleans or The Dead Woman's Secret	Royal Victoria Theatre (The Old Vic) Jan 1847	
Drama	The Ship Boy or The White Slave of Guadaloupe	Royal Victoria Theatre (The Old Vic) 1847	
Drama	The Lighterman of Bankside or The Orphan of Bermondsey	Royal Victoria Theatre (The Old Vic) Jan 1848	
Drama	Jane Eyre or The Secrets of Thornfield Manor	Royal Victoria Theatre (The Old Vic) Jan 1848	
Drama	Jack Frock	City of London Theatre, Bishopsgate Feb 1848	
Drama	Rose Clinton or The Victim of Circumstantial Evidence	Britannia Theatre, Hoxton Apr 1848	
Drama	The Broken Home or The Artisan's Daughter	Britannia Theatre, Hoxton 1848	
Drama	The Road to Transportation	Britannia Theatre, Hoxton 1848	
Drama	The Blacksmith of Ghent	Royal Victoria Theatre (The Old Vic) Jun 1848	
Drama	Leah and Nathan or Leah, the Jewess of Constantina or The Arab's Sacrifice	City of London Theatre, Bishopsgate Jun 1848	
Drama	Marion Hazelton or The Child of the Wronged	Royal Victoria Theatre (The Old Vic) June 1848	
Drama	Time Tries All	Olympic Theatre Sep 1848	
Drama	Frank Wildeye or The Spendthrift Husband	Royal Victoria Theatre (The Old Vic) 1848	
Drama	The Green Hills of Surrey	Royal Victoria Theatre (The Old Vic) Jan 1849	
Drama	The Heir of Ashmore or Time's Story	Royal Victoria Theatre (The Old Vic) Feb 1849	
Drama	The Maid of Velitri or The Last Deed of Garboni	Royal Victoria Theatre (The Old Vic) Apr 1849	
Drama	The Outcast of Lausanne or Claudine of Switzerland, The Wanderer of the Jura	Royal Victoria Theatre (The Old Vic) May 1849	
Pictorial Drama	The Soldier's Progress or The Horrors of War	Royal Victoria Theatre (The Old Vic) Nov 1849	
Drama	Hearts at Fault or The Heart Test	Surrey Theatre Mar 1850	
Farce	The Two Polts	Surrey Theatre Nov 1850	
Drama	Belphegor the Itinerant	Surrey Theatre Jan 1851	
Drama	The World's Games or High and Low	Surrey Theatre May 1851	
Drama	Living in Glass Houses	Surrey Theatre May 1851	
Drama	Roland the Rider	Surrey Theatre Jun 1851	
Drama	The Magic of Life	Surrey Theatre Jun 1851	
Drama	The Chateau of Valenza	Olympic Theatre Jul 1851	
Farce	The Two Bloomers	Surrey Theatre Oct 1851	
Operetta	The Charmed Harp	Surrey Theatre Aug 1852	
Farce	Going to Cremorne	Surrey Theatre Oct 1852	
Drama	Life Seasons or Hearts and Homes	Surrey Theatre Oct 1852	
Drama	Off to the Diggings	Surrey Theatre Oct 1852	
Drama	Uncle Tom's Cabin	Surrey Theatre Nov 1852	
Drama	The Marriage Day or The Life Chase	Surrey Theatre Nov 1852	
Drama	The Gamblers Wife	Surrey Theatre Oct 1853	
Drama	Old Joe and Young Joe or The Martini Family	Surrey Theatre Oct 1853	
Pantomime	The Vale of Gem or Harlequin; Sinbad the Sailor or The Fairy of the Coral Grot	Royal Adelphi Theatre, Liverpool Dec 1853	
Drama	Eustace or Eustace Baudin	Surrey Theatre Jan 1854	
Drama	The Sultan and the Czar	Surrey Theatre Apr 1854	
Drama	Deeds, not Words or The Drooping Flower!	Surrey Theatre Jan 1855	
Comedy	Tricks and Trials	Queen's Theatre, Manchester Mar 1856	
Comedy	Double Faced People	Theatre Royal, Haymarket Feb 1857	
Comedy Drama	A Wicked Wife	Theatre Royal, Haymarket Feb 1857	
Drama	The One Word or Pride and Honour	Surrey Theatre Jan 1858	
Drama	The Three Thieves of Bucklesbury	City of London Theatre, Bishopsgate Oct 1859	
Drama	The Students or Sorry	Surrey Theatre Feb 1861	
Drama	Battle with the World	City of London Theatre, Bishopsgate Nov 1861	
Drama	The Roman Nose	City of London Theatre, Bishopsgate Jul 1863	

=== Notes ===
Bounce or The Ojibbeway Indians or The American Indians co-written by J M Maddox
Aged Forty Thomas Hailes Lacy publisher
Taken by Surprise also performed at the Grecian Theatre and co-written by J M Maddox
Clarissa Harlowe also performed at the City of London Theatre Oct 1846 and the Surrey Theatre 1859. Adapted from the French play by Samuel Richardson. Thomas Hailes Lacy published and co-adapted
The Cook of Kennington or No Followers Allowed co-written by D W Osbaldiston
The Gunsmith of Orleans or The Dead Women's Secret book written by Eliza Sheridan published in 1847
Jane Eyre or The Secrets of Thornfield Manor was the first theatrical production (performed in 1848) of Charlotte Brontë's novel. It has been adapted and was performed at The Colour House Theatre, Merton Abbey Mills in Jun 2009
Rose Clinton or The Victim of Circumstantial Evidence also performed at The Old Vic 1849, City of London Theatre 1863. co-written by Arthur Williams
The Broken Home or The Artisan's Daughter also performed at the Soho Theatre 1859, City of London Theatre 1863 and co-written by Arthur Williams
The Road to Transportation co-written by Arthur Williams
Leah and Nathan or Leah, the Jewess of Constantina or The Arab's Sacrifice also performed at City of London Theatre Aug 1863. As The Jewess or The Council of Constance by Thomas Hailes Lacy performed at the Old Vic and Theatre Royal, Drury Lane in 1835
Time Tries All 1850s: Birmingham, Manchester, Liverpool, Sheffield, Glasgow, Sadlers Wells Theatre, George St. Theatre, Dublin, many UK Provincial Theatres and locations in the USA. 1860s: Wolverhampton, St. James’s Theatre, St George’s Hall, Adelphi Theatre, London, The Olympic Theatre, Lyceum Theatre, Royal Victoria (Old Vic), many Provincial locations. 1870s: Olympia Dramatic Club, Royal Albert Hall, Kings Cross Theatre, St George’s Hall, Vincent Dramatic Company, and in California and other US states.1880s: Royal Artillery Theatre, other locations.Thomas Hailes Lacy publisher, Miss Emma Barrett starred Aug 1861, Amy Sedgwick played Laura Leeson and chose the part for her return to the Theatre Mar 1862, Sidney Frances Bateman starred Dec 1865
Frank Wildeye or The Spendthrift Husband co-written by D W Osbaldiston
The Green Hills of Surrey co-written by D W Osbaldiston. The Green Hills of Surrey is also a poem written by William Cox Bennett
The Heir of Ashmore or Time's Story co-written by D W Osbaldiston
The Soldier's Progress or The Horrors of War also performed in Provincial Theatres Jan 1850, Mar 1850, Jun 1850. May 1851, Jan 1852, Feb 1853, Mar 1853, Jan 1854, Oct 1854, Jan 1855, Jun 1856. Manchester Jul 1850 (ten nights) and Aug 1852, Penzance Mar 1851, Dublin Apr 1853, St George’s Hall Dec 1855. Thomas Hailes Lacy publisher
The Two Polts also performed in Provincial Theatres Jun 1856 and Oct 1859. Thomas Hailes Lacy publisher
Belphegor the Itinerant Thomas Hailes Lacy publisher
The Charmed Harp music by Wilhelm Meyer Lutz
Life's Seasons or Hearts and Homes co-written by William Creswick
Off to the Diggings co-written by William Creswick and R Shepherd
Uncle Tom's Cabin co-written by William Creswick and William Bodham Donne
The Marriage Day or The Life Chase co-written by R Shepherd
Old Joe and Young Joe or The Martini Family also performed at the Surrey Theatre Dec 1860. Adapted from the French play The Martini Family or O.J and Y.J
Eustache or Eustache Baudin also performed at the Olympic Theatre, New York City, USA Apr 1862; Richmond Theatre, Virginia, USA Mar, May and Nov 1863; Salt Lake City, USA Oct 1863 (adaption); Brooklyn Academy of Music, NY USA Nov 1863; Christchurch, New Zealand Mar 1866; Opening Night of the new Opera House in Springfield, Illinois USA Dec 1866; various Theatres the US in 1867; Theatre Royal, Nottingham Jan 1869; Theatre Royal, Birmingham Jan 1869; Chicago, Illinois USA May 1869; Three UK performances in 1870 and one in 1879; Galveston Theatre, Texas, USA Apr 1871;Pence Opera House, Minneapolis USA Mar 1888; UK Performances in 1885 and 1889; Grand Museum, Boston USA Jun 1893. T G Bishop credited in the published play as co-writer. Opening play of the newly named Olympic Theatre, New York, owned by George L Fox who also played the character "Marcel". Performance in Richmond performed under the title "Eustache the Condemned".Performance in Boston under the title "The Man of Destiny" performed by H Percy Meldon and Ethel Tucker
Deeds, not Words or The Drooping Flower co-written by Arthur Williams
Tricks and Trials John Courtney impersonated three characters
Double Faced People also performed at Theatre Royal, Haymarket Feb 1857, Theatre Royal, Brighton Dec 1857. Performance 26 Feb 1857 attended by Queen Victoria, Prince Albert and the Princess Royal. The Queen wrote in her diary" ... a pretty little drama..." The programme also included a performance of A Wicked Wife. Thomas Hailes Lacy published
A Wicked Wife also performed at Theatre Royal, Haymarket Feb 1857. Adapted from the French play Une Femme qui deteste son Marie. Thomas Hailes Lacy published and co-adapted
The Students or Sorry adapted from the French play "The Students of D’Orilly".William Creswick played Roger D’Orilly
