= Samuel French =

American entrepreneur (1821–1898)

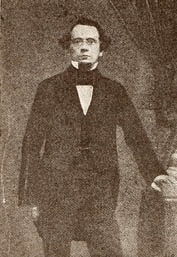
Samuel French in 1851

Samuel French (1821–1898) was an American entrepreneur who, together with British actor, playwright and theatrical manager Thomas Hailes Lacy, pioneered in the field of theatrical publishing and the licensing of plays.

== Biography ==
French founded his publishing business in New York City in 1854. In 1859, he visited London, where he met Lacy, who had given up the stage and been active as a theatrical bookseller since the mid-1840s. Lacy, who had removed his shop from Wellington Street, Covent Garden to 89 Strand in 1857, had also started publishing acting editions of dramas. Lacy's Acting Edition of Plays, published between 1848 and 1873, would eventually run to 99 volumes containing 1,485 individual pieces.

French and Lacy became partners, each acting as the other's agent across the Atlantic. In 1872, French decided to take up permanent residence in London, leaving his son Thomas Henry French in charge of the New York business. When Lacy retired in 1873, he sold out to French for £5,000. Lacy died in the same year, and French finally established his name as the most important theatrical publisher in England. At the time of his own death in 1898, almost all renowned English playwrights of the present and recent past had been represented by his company.

== See also ==
- Samuel French, Inc.
