= Ann Pitt =

British actress (1718–1799)

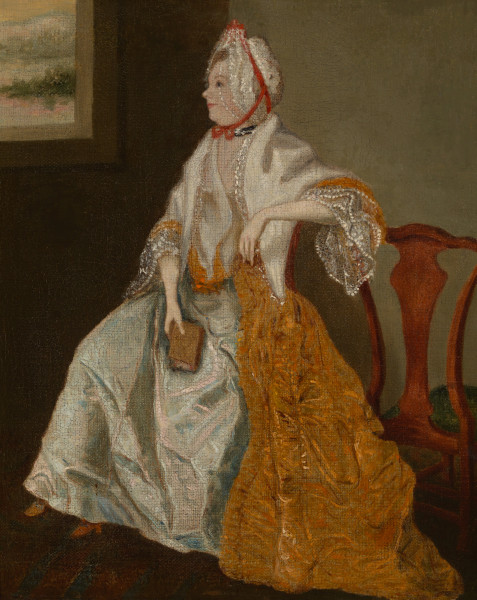
- c. 1775 by unknown artist
- Born: 1718
- Died: 18 December 1799 (aged 80–81); London

Ann Pitt (1718 – 18 December 1799) was a British actress.

== Life ==
Pitt was born in 1718 to Elizabeth. Her father, John, was a warden for London Bridge and he sold fish. Her brother, Cecil, became rich dealing in dry goods whereas Ann's career led her to acting comic parts. She is first advertised as being in the cast in 1745 for a Drury Lane production.

In 1752 she joined the Covent Garden Theatre company.

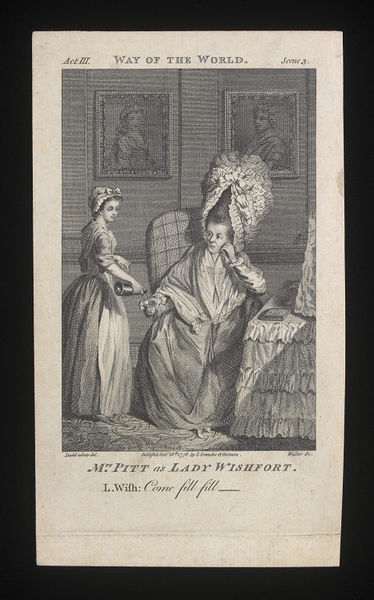
Mrs Pitt as Lady Wishfort

Harriet Pitt was born to Ann Pitt in about 1748 whilst her mother was acting at Richmond in Surrey. The father's name is recorded as "Henry" but this is thought to be a convenient fiction. A second child Mary Ann (Pitt) Ritchards was born in 1759 and whilst still illegitimate the father was known as the scene painter John Inigo Richards. Mary Ann's father later married someone else but Richards acknowledged her as his daughter in his will and left her a snuff box decorated with Ann Pitt's portrait.

In 1776 an engraving was published of Mrs Pitt playing Mrs Wishfort in William Congreve's The Way of the World. The engraving was made by Daniel Dodd. This was the highlight of her career and one of her proudest moments.

Ann Pitt retired in 1792 and went live with her daughter in Islington. She died in London in 1799 from natural causes. She was buried in Islington in a plot belonging to her grandson Charles Isaac Mungo Dibdin.
