= Wisbech Electric Theatre =

19th-century theatre in Wisbech

- Onyx and Regent
- Interactive map of Wisbech Electric Theatre
- Address: Timber Market, Wisbech, Isle of Ely; England
- Coordinates: 52°39′41″N 0°09′51″E
- Current use: car park

Construction
- Opened: 1910
- Closed: 1941
- Years active: 1910-1941

The Wisbech Electric Theatre was a cinema and theatre in Wisbech, England. It was opened in 1910.

== History ==
The proprietor was Mr Cooper J Elm and the manager Mr GF Allen. The suppliers of the electrical equipment were Garrod & Hunt, London. It was elaborately fitted up, with 450 seats. The operators room was above the entrance. The floor slopes towards the stage, the more expensive seats bring on a raised platform at the back of the building. After WW1 Mr HB Harris (aka Vincent Revelle), assistant manager at the Electric Theatre, Norwich was appointed manager. He left to become manager of the Regent cinema, Chelmsford. It was renamed twice, the Regent Cinema/Theatre and the Onyx Cinema. The 25 feet deep stage and three dressing rooms allowed it to be used as a theatre for variety acts etc in the 1930s. A German bomb in 1941 led to its demolition. The site then became a car park.
