= Phillip Harth =

American literary scholar (1926–2020)

Phillip Harth (February 1, 1926 – April 28, 2020) was an American literary scholar.

Phillip Harth was a Sioux City, Iowa, native, born to parents John and Grace Harth on February 1, 1926. He attended Trinity College. Upon completing his bachelor's degree in 1946, Harth served in the United States Army. Harth obtained a master's degree from the University of Chicago in 1949, and continued his doctoral studies, funded partly by a Fulbright Scholarship, at the University College, London. Harth began teaching at Northwestern University in 1956, two years before the University of Chicago awarded him a doctorate. He was awarded a Guggenheim Fellowship in 1962, and taught at Northwestern until 1965. The next year, Harth joined the University of Wisconsin faculty. From 1977 to his retirement in 1996, Harth held the Merritt Y. Hughes Professorship in English. He died in Middleton, Wisconsin, on April 28, 2020.

== Books ==
- Harth, Phillip (1961). Swift and Anglican Rationalism: The Religious Background of "A Tale of a Tub"'. Chicago: University of Chicago Press. ISBN 9780226318349.
- Harth, Phillip (1968). Contexts of Dryden's Thought. Chicago: University of Chicago. ISBN 9780226318318.
