= George Dibdin Pitt =

English playwright and actor

George Dibdin Pitt (born George Pitt, 30 March 1795 – 16 February 1855) was an English actor, stage manager and prolific playwright, specializing in melodrama. He was the first playwright to dramatize the fictional character Sweeney Todd, in his 1847 play The String of Pearls; or, The Fiend of Fleet Street. The character was originally created by James Malcolm Rymer and Thomas Peckett Prest and had first appeared in a penny dreadful serial titled The String of Pearls.

== Biography ==
George Pitt was born on 30 March 1795 in Lancashire to musician George Cecil Pitt and his wife, actress Sophia Pyne. George Cecil Pitt (baptised 1767 – 1820) was an illegitimate son of the actress Harriet Pitt and George Anderson. Harriet Pitt later had other children, with the musician and dramatist Charles Dibdin. As a young man, George Pitt took Dibdin as his middle name in honour of his uncles Charles Dibdin the younger and Thomas John Dibdin, who helped him find theatrical work. He married Sarah Rosalind Humber on 28 April 1814.

In 1829 he wrote expressly a humorous piece Peter Proteous for seven-year old child actor Master Herbert aka (The Infant Roscius) Henry Herbert from Wisbech, Isle of Ely. At least 250 of his plays survive, in whole or in part, dating from 1831 onward. in 1835 he write pieces for the two Master Grossmiths. In 1840 his play Rookwood at the City of London Theatre, adapted from the novel Rookwood by William Harrison Ainsworth, included the first dramatic depiction of Dick Turpin, the 18th-century highwayman. From 1841, he had a long-running success at the Royal Victoria Theatre with Susan Hopley; or, The Vicissitudes of a Servant Girl, adapted from the novel Adventures of Susan Hopley; or, Circumstantial Evidence by Catherine Crowe. The actress, and de facto co-theatre manager, Eliza Ann Vincent, in the title role, backed Dibdin's work. She and the theatre achieved great success with this play which lasted a decade. By 1849, it had been performed 343 times.

In 1843 he became actor-manager of the Britannia Theatre, where he produced more sensational melodramas such as Pauline the Pirate in 1845 and Margaret Maddison, the Female Felon in 1846. The Lord Chamberlain's Office refused to license some of his particularly lurid plays.

In 1847, Pitt produced The String of Pearls; or, The Fiend of Fleet Street at the Britannia Theatre, adapted from the story The String of Pearls: A Romance which was serialized over 1846–47 in The People's Periodical and Family Library. The play opened on 22 February, even before the last episode of the serial was printed, in March. In his adaptation, Pitt turned the barber Sweeney Todd into the central character. Audiences were fascinated by the villain's complete lack of remorse, as well as by the stage device of the barber chair which inverted to eject its occupant, and the play became another long-running success.

He died on 16 February 1855 in Hoxton, London, in reduced circumstances after a long period of ill-health. He was survived by a daughter and three sons, including Charles Dibdin Pitt, a well-known tragedian who toured America from 1847 and later became lessee of the Theatre Royal, Sheffield.
