= Master Grossmith =

19th-century English actor

William Robert Grossmith
- Born: 1818; Reading, England
- Died: 1899 (aged 80–81)
- Occupation(s): Actor and prosthetic Limb manufacturer

William Robert Grossmith, also known as Master Grossmith (1818–1899), was a 19th-century child actor, the eldest son of William Grossmith, who then established a second career as a maker of prosthetic limbs.

== Career ==
Grossmith was known as the 'Infant Roscius' or 'Young Roscius' as he began acting at a very young age. In 1825 a pamphlet was published publicising this prodigy child actor with the title The Life of the Celebrated Infant Roscius, Master Grossmith of Reading, Berks, only seven years and a quarter Old. Another, retitled to not yet nine years of age, was published in 1827.

He also made appearances with a younger sibling, Master Benjamin Grossmith. After retiring from the stage William made a second career out of prosthetic limb manufacture. Their new entertainment for 1836, in three parts, was written expressly for them by George Dibdin Pitt, and performed in King's Lynn, Wisbech and other provincial theatres.

In fact, so well-respected were William Grossmith' products that in 1856 he published a book on the subject: Amputations and Artificial Limbs (or Grossmith on Amputations, Artificial Legs, Hands &c.)

== Legacy ==
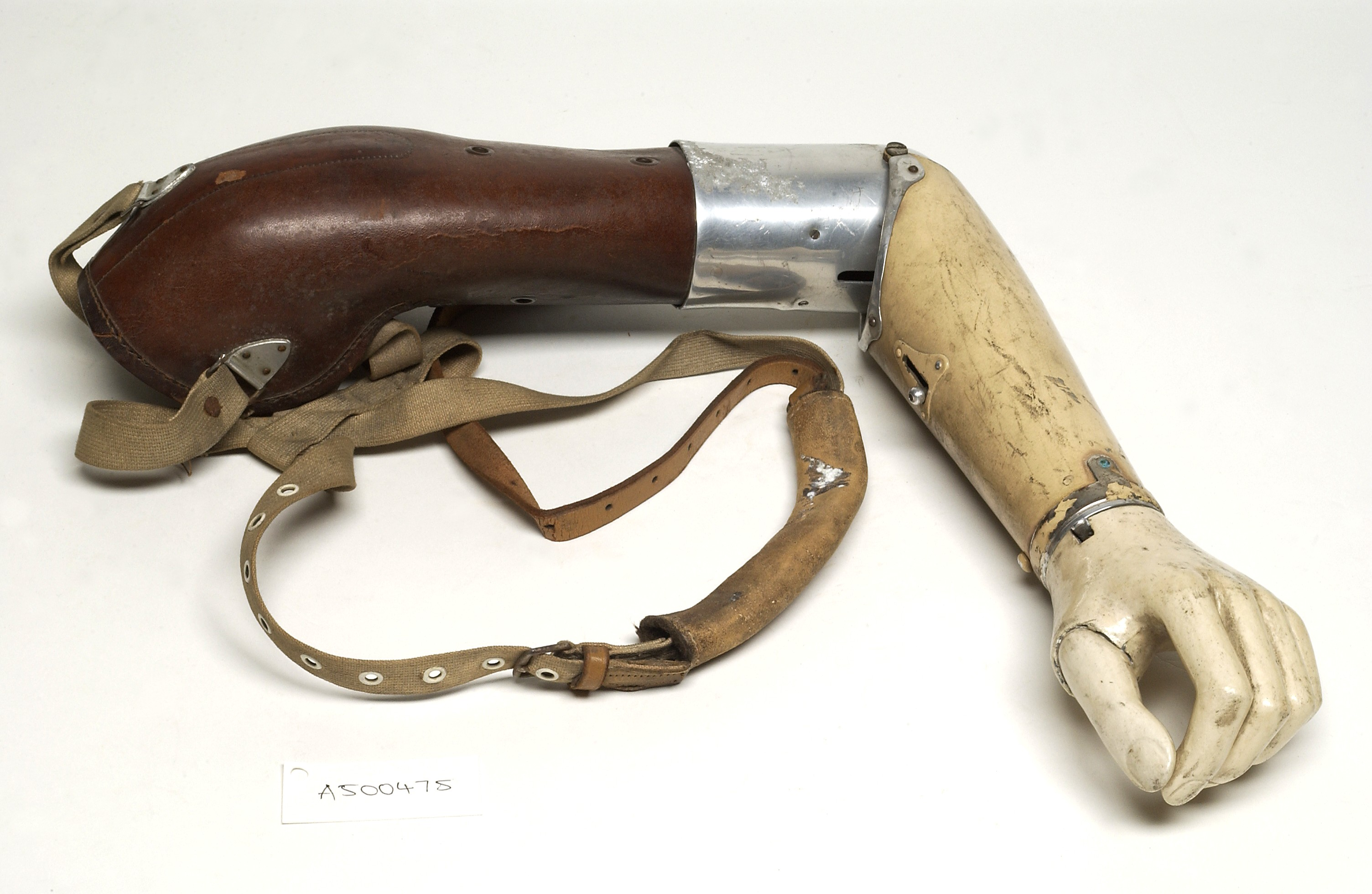
An artificial left arm made by W. R. Grossmith.

A painting of Grossmith as Richard in William Shakespeare's Richard III by G. Hancock is in the Victoria and Albert Museum. A print of Grossmith as a child is in the British Museum collection.

Artificial limbs made by Grossmith in his later career are held in the Science Museum.
