= Thomas Hailes Lacy =

British actor, playwright, theatrical manager, bookseller, and theatrical publisher

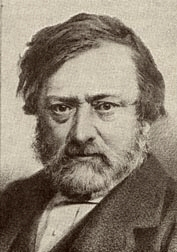
Thomas Hailes Lacy

Thomas Hailes Lacy (1809 – 1 August 1873) was a British actor, playwright, theatrical manager, bookseller, and theatrical publisher.

== Life ==
Lacy made his West End stage debut in 1828 but soon turned manager, a position he held from 1841 at The Theatre in Sheffield (destroyed by fire in 1935). On 25 January 1842, Lacy married actress Frances Dalton who was an actress known as Fanny Cooper. She was taking leading parts at Covent Garden and the Haymarket. The marriage probably took place at St Paul's church in Covent Garden, but maybe in Sheffield. He and his wife toured England together. Lacy's roles included Jacques (As You Like It) and Banquo (Macbeth). He would appear with his wife when she played Countess Wintersen in The Stranger, Nerissa in The Merchant of Venice, and Virginia in James Sheridan Knowles's Virginius.

In the mid-1840s, Lacy set up a business as a theatrical bookseller in London, at first in Wellington Street, Covent Garden and, from 1857, at 89 Strand. He also ventured into publishing with an innovative approach to playscripts, producing acting editions of recent plays so that each actor could have a full script to work from. Lacy's Acting Edition of Plays, published between 1848 and 1873, eventually ran to over 100 volumes containing 1,485 individual pieces.

In 1859, he made the acquaintance of American entrepreneur Samuel French, who had started a similar publishing business in New York City five years earlier and was visiting London. Lacy and French became partners, each acting as the other's agent across the Atlantic. In 1872, French decided to take up permanent residence in London, and when Lacy retired without any immediate heirs in 1873, he sold out to French for five thousand pounds.

His wife died in 1872. They had a son but he was mentally ill and died in 1895. Thomas Hailes Lacy died at 1 August 1873 in Sutton, Surrey. His disregard for copyright during his life meant that there was a claim for £700 (equivalent to £65,806 in 2025) for infringement of rights. His executors paid after they negotiated the bill down to £250 (equivalent to £23,502 in 2025).

== Works by Lacy ==
- The Tower of London (play, 1840) (with Thomas Higgie)
- The School for Daughters (comedy, 1843) (with Dennis Lawler)
- Martin Chuzzlewit (play, 1844) (with Thomas Higgie)
- Clarissa Harlowe (tragedy, 1846) (with John Courtney)
- The Pickwickians; or the Peregrinations of Sam Weller (farce, 1850) - adapted from Samuel Weller, or, The Pickwickians (1837)
- A Silent Woman (farce, 1851)
- Belphegor; or, The Mountebank (drama, 1851, from the French (with Thomas Higgie)
- Jeanette's Wedding Day (farce from Les Noces de Jeanette, 1855).
