= Rudolphe Cabanel =

Rudolphe Cabanel (also Rudolph) (1763–1839) was a German architect, engineer and machinist, known for his work on British theatres.

== Life ==
Cabanel was born at Aachen in 1762. He came to England early in life, and settled in London. He died in Mount Gardens, Lambeth, on 5 February 1839.

== Works ==
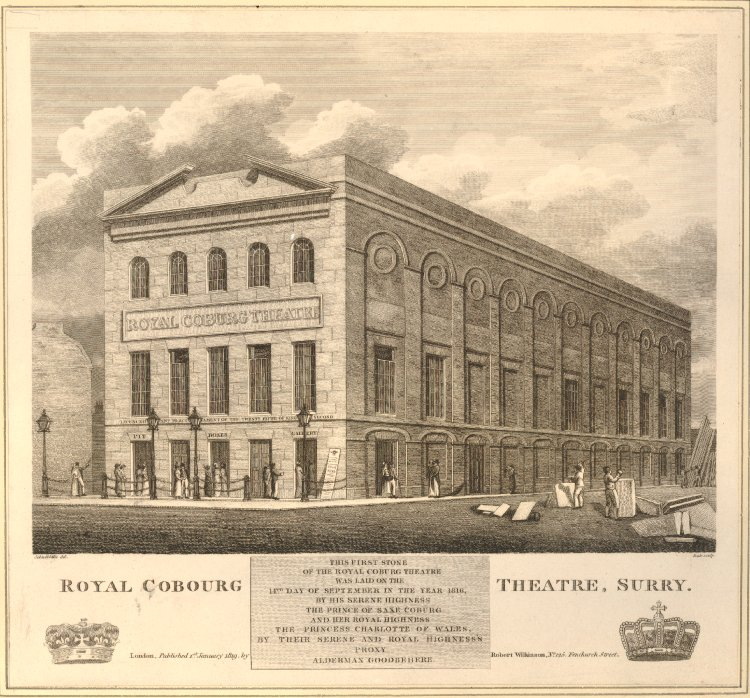
Royal Cobourg Theatre, 1819 engraving

Cabanel was employed in construction of several theatres. He designed the stage arrangements of the old Drury Lane Theatre for the reconstruction of the 1790s; in 1811, after the theatre was destroyed in a fire, the designs of Benjamin Dean Wyatt were preferred. He worked on the Royal Circus (later named the Surrey Theatre), 1805 (burnt down 30–1 January 1868), and the Royal Cobourg Theatre, 1818. At Sadler's Wells Theatre he reconstructed the auditorium, from 1802, following a model by Richard Hughes.

He was the inventor of the "Cabanel roof", and a number of theatrical machines.

== Family ==
Harriot Cabanel, a dancer at the Royal Circus and Rudolphe's sister, married the actor Jack Helme.

== Notes ==
Attribution

This article incorporates text from a publication now in the public domain: Stephen, Leslie, ed. (1886). "Cabanel, Rudolph". Dictionary of National Biography. Vol. 8. London: Smith, Elder & Co.
