= Angles Theatre =

Theatre in Wisbech, Isle of Ely, Cambridgeshire, England

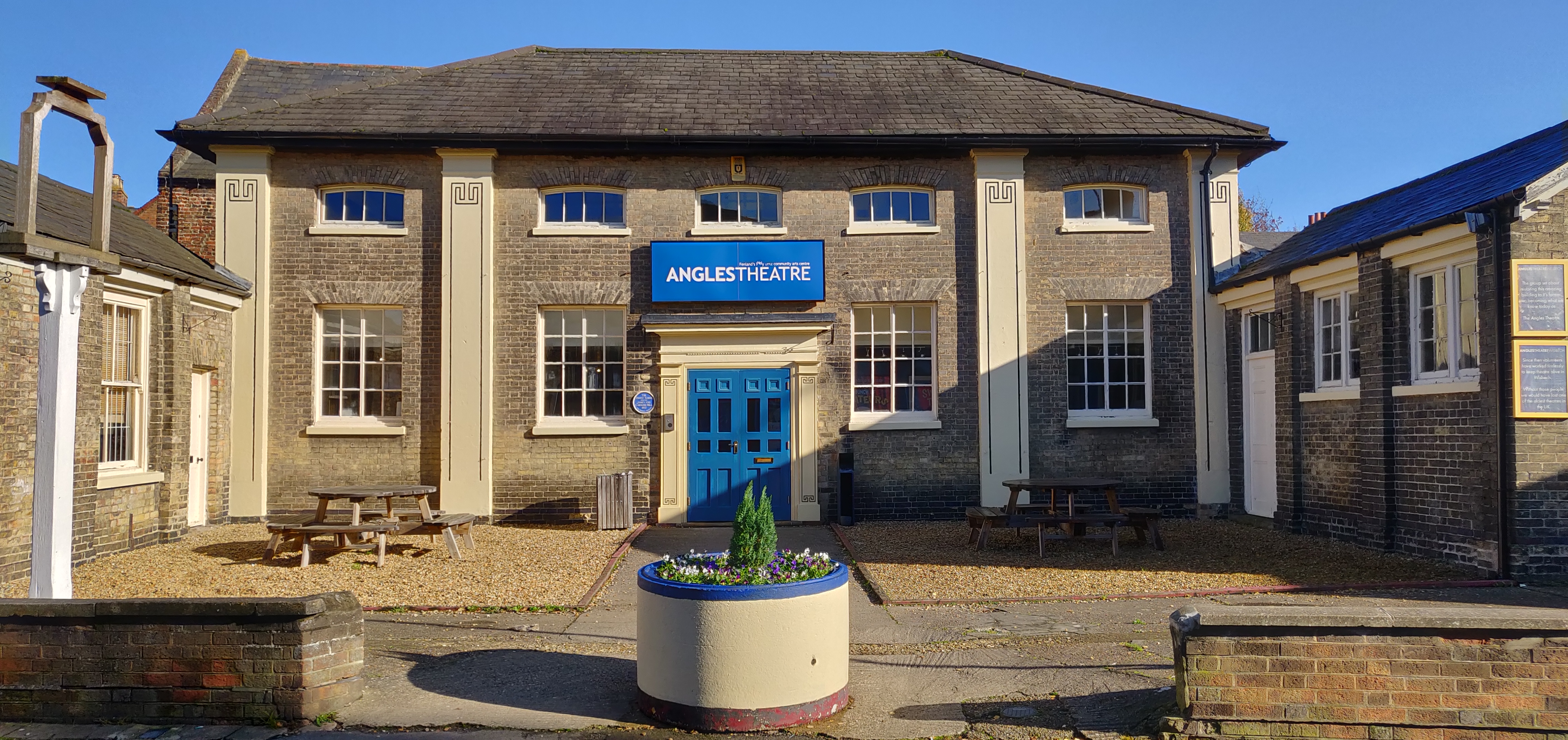
- Angles Theatre entrance, with the theatre behind left
- Interactive map of Angles Theatre
- Former names: Wisbech Theatre, Concert-room, Crescent Passage
- Address: Alexandra Road, Wisbech, Cambridgeshire, PE13 1HQ; Wisbech; England
- Coordinates: 52.6639°N 0.1590°E
- Current use: community theatre and arts centre

Construction
- Opened: 1790
- Reopened: 1978

Website
- www.anglestheatre.co.uk

The Angles Theatre is a theatre and historic Georgian playhouse in the market town of Wisbech, Isle of Ely, Cambridgeshire, England. It is among the oldest of Britain's theatres. The current premises consists of the original theatre building and a former library, originally an "infant" school built in 1837, both of which are Grade II listed. The patrons are Sir Derek Jacobi, Jo Brand, Claire Tomalin and Dame Cleo Laine.

The theatre was believed to have been built in 1790 as part of the Lincoln theatre circuit and was generally referred to as the Wisbech Theatre. Regular performances at the theatre continued until about 1850 when it was used as a concert room for a number of years. At the end of the 19th century, part of the property was used by the School of Science and Art. The building was returned to use as a theatre and arts venue, and renamed as The Angles, in 1978.

== History ==
=== 18th century ===
The Licensing Act 1737 created the office of Examiner of Plays, whose responsibilities included censoring all plays in Britain. In 1778, John Larpent was appointed inspector of plays by the Marquis of Hertford, who was then Lord Chamberlain. He preserved manuscript copies of all the plays submitted to the inspector from 1737 to his death in 1824, including those produced at the theatre in Wisbech. Buildings in Wisbech in Pickard's Lane and on the Sutton road were used as theatres in the 18th century. The Whitley and Herbert company of comedians performed in the town during Wisbech Race Week in June 1777. In 1778 or 1779 Italian writer Giuseppe Marc'Antonio Baretti attended a theatre performance here. Other early theatres in Wisbech, referred to in newspapers and other documents, appear to have been temporary structures such as that erected near the High street by the company of James Augustus "Jemmy" Whitley (c. 1724–1781) for a season in 1779. Whitley announced, in 1779, an intention to build an elegant and extensive structure for the 1780 season. With Whitley's death, however, that theatre was never built, and the way was left open for the development of a theatre in Wisbech by others. The Theatrical Representations Act 1788 allowed local magistrates to license occasional performances for periods of up to 60 days.

An early reference to a theatre on Deadman's Lane (later Great Church Street and now Alexandra Road) is a benefit performance, for Mr and Mrs James Edward Miller, of the play The Battle of Hexham, on 20 May 1791, which was the last performance of the 1791 season. The Stamford Mercury of 24 February 1792 stated, "A correspondent from Wisbech informs us, that a very elegant theatre is just fitted up in the compleatest stile [sic], and will be opened on Saturday, March 3d, with the admired comedy of As You Like It, and the Farce of No Song, No Supper." The theatre was built by Miller, who managed it jointly with Thomas Shaftoe Robertson until 2 May 1796, when Robertson purchased Miller's rights in all the properties of the Lincoln theatre circuit. In 1793 The Millers advertised the last benefit of the 1793 season at Wisbech Theatre to be Everyone Has His Fault and Don Juan.

When not in use for performances the theatre regularly held auctions, the most prominent of which was the sale of household furniture, linen and china from Wisbech Castle, belonging to the late Edward Southwell. This was most likely the first auction held at the "New Theatre" in November 1791, because the sale of the mentioned items was not permitted on the castle premises.

Robertson married Frances Maria Ross in 1793.

=== 1800 to 1840 ===
Robertson announced in 1806: "The Theatre has undergone considerable improvement and will be lighted up with new and elegant chandeliers"; these are unlikely to have been supplied by gas as the town council did not negotiate gas supplies until the 1830s. Child actor William Henry West Betty performed at the Wisbech theatre in 1808. Amelia Holman Gilfert and her father Joseph George Holman, appeared in 1812 as Cora and Rolla in Pizarro, Desdemona and Othello in Othello and Lady Macbeth and Macbeth in Macbeth, and she played Lady Contest in the farce The Wedding Day. The use of weapons firing blanks, candles, oil lamps, fireworks and other special effects could cause fires and injuries. For example, Fanny Robertson's half-sister Mary Brown was a member of the Wisbech company until she married an actor of the Stamford company and moved to Stamford, where, in 1816 whilst working on a dress, a candle set her clothes on fire; she died of her burns. William Hilton the elder (father of William Hilton) created scenery for the Robertsons for many years until the 1820s.

Madame Tussaud brought her touring waxwork show to the theatre in November and December 1825. The pit was covered over to enable the display of her works. A military band played. Tickets cost one shilling, and the theatre was crowded each evening.

The 1827 season included Sarah Booth's appearance for five nights in May, playing Juliet in Romeo and Juliet. The theatre was "entirely new Painted", in addition to improvements made in the previous year. The "Infant Roscius" Master Herbert performed in Wisbech in 1829. Edmund Kean appeared in April 1831. The same year, Robertson died, leaving his wife Fanny in charge of the Robertson theatre company. T. W. Robertson, the son of her nephew, William Shaftoe Robertson, performed here, aged five, as Hamish, the son of the title character in Rob Roy.

The banker James Hill (father of Octavia Hill and Miranda Hill) bought the theatre and adjoining land in 1835 and started to invest money in the theatre and in further developing the site. The two Masters Grossmith (William and Benjamin) performed in December 1835. When the theatre opened in February 1836 for a one-month season, it was advertised as the "New Theatre", with the scenic department and every other arrangement on a scale of expensive improvement never before attempted in Wisbech. The improvements did not go unnoticed; in May a Georgina Gooch was charged with stealing the theatre's gas fittings. William Macready performed here in June 1836, and social reformer Robert Owen gave a lecture in January 1837. The five-week 1837 season opened in February with The Stranger followed by the farce Love, Law, and Physics. The theatre was described as having a ceiling "designed from the celebrated Painting by Rubens, in the Louvre; the Fronts of the two tiers of Boxes are formed in compartments of Groups of Figures from the Mythology: the space between each Panel finished by a splendid Drapery of Green and Gold, in imitation of the Ornamental arrangement of the Italian Opera in 1831, the whole forming a coup d'oeil of elegant embellishment never before attempted in Wisbech".

Hill was also the owner of the newspaper The Star in the East, in which he promoted the theatre's productions, such as the four day engagement of vocalist Harriet Waylett. He built a progressive infant school in front of the theatre in 1838. Mr Young performed the titles roles in Virginius and Hamlet and took the part of Quasimodo in Esmerelda in March 1838. Richard Owen returned that year to give three lectures.

The Wisbech Dramatic Society gave their first performances, The Castle Spectre and Hunting a Turtle, in December 1838 and January 1839. They performed The Honeymoon and The Haunted Inn in June. The theatre pit was boarded over to facilitate the 1839 New Year's Eve Ball. In March 1839 the theatre hosted circus acts for three days. Also in 1839, Mrs Robertson engaged Henry Compton to perform at Wisbech and other Lincoln circuit venues. A critic wrote that his performance as Touchstone in As You Like It and as Mawwarm in Isaac Bickerstaff's The Hypocrite "was capital, he kept the audience in one tumult of laughter from beginning to end". On 27 June 1840 James and Thomas Hill went bankrupt, and their estates were sold by auction, including the Wisbech theatre, which Mrs Robertson was then leasing.

=== 1841 to 1899 ===
The theatre opened for the usual five-week season on 5 March 1841 with a new company and extensive internal alterations. The Cambridge Independent Press described the improvements: "[A] floor has been laid along the entire length from the stage to the boxes, and the space hitherto appropriated to the stage, tastefully embellished with variegated drapery; the ensemble forming an elegant saloon, adapted to public assemblies, lectures, &c., but easily convertible, we believe, to its original use." In October a newspaper reported that "Wisbech old workhouse is to be sold on the 30th inst., the building is of immense size, in a good situation, and at small expense might be converted into a theatre. The present theatre is much too small, and in a miserable situation, difficult of access in carriages." A later report gave further details of the interior:

[N]otice the splendid manner in which the spirited proprietor of the theatre has fitted it up, which renders it excellently adapted for a variety of purposes for which a spacious room is much wanted here. The pit has a temporary covering connected with the stage, the sides and back of which are surrounded folds of drapery, alternatively scarlet and green, and from the ceiling two splendid chandeliers are suspended. The whole can be removed when it is wanted for ordinary purposes in a short time.

The Stamford Mercury reported, in 1842: "A Travelling fair known as The Mart arrives in Wisbech each March for 'Mart Week'. ... [B]oth travelling performers and the local theatre sought to benefit from the large crowds attending the fair and race weeks." Other travelling exhibitions used the theatre as a venue; in November 1842 a Grand Moving Panorama was set up at the theatre, claiming to use 20,000 feet of canvas to display scenes such as the "Fire of York Minster" and the whole city of New York. Prices were similar to those for a theatrical performance: Boxes 2s, Pit 1s and Gallery 6d.

In April 1843, The Theatre wrote: "Mrs Robertson had her farewell benefit, having resigned the management [of her theatres] to her nephew, Mr. [William Shaftoe] Robertson. She appeared in the character of Lady Eleanor Irwin, in Elizabeth Inchbald's comedy Everyone has his Fault after which she delivered a very neat and appropriate address. There was a full house, but we are sorry to say the season has been productive of very few even tolerable houses." The recently redecorated theatre was offered for sale by auction at the White Hart Inn in May 1843. The Robertson company continued as a tenant. The Licensing Act 1737 was modified by the Theatres Act 1843 so that spoken drama could be performed in any theatre. In August 1843 the theatre was used for a concert by the Ely Cathedral choir. In November 1843 the Wisbech Theatre was again put up for auction "in an excellent condition". In 1845 Joseph Richardson's Rock Band gave morning and evening concerts with their lithophone. Star appearances at Wisbech and the rest of the Lincoln theatre circuit in spring 1845, for which the theatres charged premium prices, were Charles Kean and his wife Kate Terry; her roles included Miss Halley in The Stranger and a role in The Honey Moon.

By the mid-1840s the situation for suburban theatres was becoming more difficult financially, and the theatre companies sought subscriptions to keep going: "Mr. Robertson has announced his intention of opening the theatre at Wisbech during the month of May, provided the inhabitants will at once engage 30 season tickets, at £1 each the subscription to extend over one year, for which Mr R guarantees twenty separate performances; the arrangement will include the engagement of all 'stars' introduced in the course of the year. ... [A] great many applications have already been made for season tickets." Henry Langdon Childe's chromatrope was exhibited by Mr Blanchard of the Royal Polytechnic Institution in late May. The press reported: "The dissolving views and images of animalculae were seen by numerous visitors".

In July 1846 Robertson's theatrical company performed a play Mind how you Wed! written by Dr Whitsed, a local GP and later mayor. The season finished with another benefit for Mrs Robertson featuring The Beggar on Horseback and the Robber's Wife; a full house was reported. In May 1847 Mr Davenport, manager of several Norfolk theatres, took a season at the Wisbech theatre, which commenced with Richard III. In August the Distin family performed a well attended concert. The following year, the composer Henry Russell gave a concert at the theatre in May. In August Robertson had a portable theatre erected in Pickard's Lane in Wisbech. Whereas the lease of the Wisbech Theatre would be £400, the temporary theatre cost him not more than £50. In December a political lecture at the theatre was given by J. Kingsley of the British Anti-State Church Association. At the beginning of 1849 the theatre yard was being used for auctions; the road was described as Great Church Lane.

In 1850 the building ceased being used as a venue for regular theatrical performances and was then used as a concert room. In August that year Mr & Miss Southgate of Wisbech Castle presented a "drawing-room" entertainment, and Henry Vincent delivered a lecture on the Great Exhibition. The following year, a building (probably the former school) was referred to as "Concert-room, Crescent Passage" when used for a lecture on Bloomerism and for lectures by Mrs Balfour that year and in 1853.

One lessee after that was Mr Saunders, a tent and marquee maker. In 1891, the School of Science and Art leased the theatre property. At that time, the Georgian theatre building still contained the stage and gallery, with the school occupying the former infant school in the front.

=== 20th century ===
The school continued to occupy the property into the beginning of the new century. A poster in the Wisbech & Fenland Museum printed by Poysers records that the building was put up for auction as "The Old Theatre" by Johnson & Easter in July 1921 at the White Lion hotel. At this time it had a pedestrian entrance from Crescent Passage. The stable, coach house and yard were occupied by Dr C. H. Gunson.

In 1978, the theatre building was "rediscovered" by drama enthusiasts looking for a space to rehearse their productions, and they renovated it, together with the former school, under its old name, Angles Theatre. On 25 November 1978 a civic opening of the building was attended by the Mayor of Wisbech and chairman of Fenland District Council and presided over by Anton Rogers. Richard Leacroft, architect and theatre historian, gave a lecture on the development of regional theatre. Another speaker was Gregor MacGregor of the Georgian Theatre Royal in Richmond, North Yorkshire. Four days later the Angles Theatre Company staged She Stoops to Conquer. This was one of the most regularly staged plays in the theatre's heyday. This may be in part because its author, Oliver Goldsmith, stayed with the Lumpkin family at Park House, Leverington, and lampooned his friend Nicholas Lumpkin (1748–1825); Goldsmith may even have written part of the play while at Park House. After spending much of his wealth Lumpkin moved to Wisbech where he died in 1825.

On 23 September 1979 the musical Songbook was performed at the theatre after relocating from the Gielgud Theatre for the single performance. This event was arranged by cast member and president of the Angles Theatre Anton Rodgers. The Wisbech Players' first production at the theatre was Pygmalion in 1979; they then used other venues until their production of The Unexpected Guest in 1988.

The architecture of the building was documented in 1980 by Richard Leacroft, who used the timbers and doorways to deduce the original design of the building. He noted that the size, shape and layout of the auditorium was similar to that of the Georgian Theatre Royal in Richmond, North Yorkshire, but the current design does not reflect the original form. In the 1980s the theatre's director was Rex Mountain. His first production in 1983 was a Ray Cooney Farce, Not Now Darling. The theatre company also toured; in 1987 its performances included David Storey's Home at Wells, Norfolk, and Romeo and Juliet outdoors at Wisbech Castle.

The theatre suffered a fire in 1991.

=== 21st century ===
In 2018 the Angles Theatre celebrated the 40th Anniversary of its reopening with an extensive programme of events including a production of She Stoops to Conquer. The 2019 pantomime production was Cinderella – the Fairy Godmother of pantomimes by Tom Whalley. The entrance to the theatre is on Alexandra Road.

The theatre closed early in 2020 due to the COVID-19 pandemic. It received government funding in 2021 and, after refurbishment, reopened on 23 September 2021, with Willy Russell's Educating Rita, followed by other productions and a Christmas pantomime.
