= List of horror films of 1970 =

A list of horror films released in 1970.

Title	Director(s)	Cast	Country	Notes	Ref.
The Ancines Woods	Pedro Olea	Amparo Soler Leal, Antonio Casas, John Steiner	Spain		
Assignment Terror	Tulio Demicheli, Hugo Fregonese	Michael Rennie, Karin Dor, Patty Shepard	Spain; West Germany; Italy		
The Beast in the Cellar	James Kelly	Beryl Reid, Flora Robson, Tessa Wyatt	United Kingdom		
Beast of Blood	Eddie Romero	John Ashley, Celeste Yarnall, Eddie Garcia	Philippines; United States		
Bigfoot	Robert F. Slatzer	John Carradine	United States		
The Bird with the Crystal Plumage	Dario Argento	Tony Musante, Suzy Kendall	Italy		
Blind Woman's Curse	Teruo Ishii	Toru Abe, Makoto Satô, Hoki Tokuda	Japan		
Blood Mania	Robert Vincent O'Neill	Peter Carpenter, Maria De Aragon, Vicki Peters	United States		
The Blood Rose	Claude Mulot	Anny Duperey, Philippe Lemaire, Howard Vernon	France		
Bloodthirsty Butchers	Andy Milligan	Annabella Wood, Berwick Kaler, Jane Hilary	United States	Filmed in England	
The Bloody Judge	Jesús Franco	Christopher Lee, Maria Schell, Leo Genn	Italy; Spain; West Germany		
The Body Beneath	Andy Milligan	Gavin Reed, Jackie Skarvellis	United States	Filmed in England	
Count Dracula	Jesús Franco	Christopher Lee, Herbert Lom, Klaus Kinski	Spain; West Germany; Italy; Liechtenstein		
Count Yorga, Vampire	Bob Kelljan	Robert Quarry, Roger Perry, Michael Murphy	United States		
Crowhaven Farm	Walter Grauman	Hope Lange, Paul Burke, Lloyd Bochner	United States	Television film	
Cry of the Banshee	Gordon Hessler	Vincent Price, Hilary Dwyer, Carl Rigg	United Kingdom		
Curse of the Vampires	Gerardo de León	Amalia Fuentes, Eddie Garcia, Romeo Vasques	United States; Philippines	aka Creatures of Evil, Blood of the Vampires	
Dream No Evil	John Hayes	Edmond O'Brien, Brooke Mills, Marc Lawrence	United States		
The Dunwich Horror	Daniel Haller	Sandra Dee, Dean Stockwell, Ed Begley	United States		
Equinox	Jack Woods	Edward Connell, Barbara Hewitt, Frank Bonner	United States		
Eugenie… The Story of Her Journey into Perversion	Jesús Franco	Marie Liljedahl, Maria Rohm, Christopher Lee	West Germany	aka De Sade 70	
An Evening of Edgar Allan Poe	Kenneth Johnson	Vincent Price	United States	Television film	
The Evils of Dorian Gray	Massimo Dallamano	Helmut Berger, Richard Todd, Herbert Lom	West Germany; Italy	Alternative title(s): The Secret of Dorian Gray	
Flesh Feast	Brad F. Grinter	Veronica Lake, Phil Philbin, Heather Hughes	United States		
Goodbye Gemini	Alan Gibson	Judy Geeson, Michael Redgrave	United Kingdom		
Guru, the Mad Monk	Andy Milligan	Neil Flanagan, Jaqueline Webb	United States		
The Horror of Frankenstein	Jimmy Sangster	Ralph Bates, Kate O'Mara, Veronica Carlson	United Kingdom		
Horror of the Blood Monsters	Al Adamson	John Carradine, Robert Dix, Vicki Volante	United States		
House of Dark Shadows	Dan Curtis	Grayson Hall, Jerry Lacy, Thayer David	United States		
I Drink Your Blood	David E. Durston	Bhaskar Roy Chowdhury, Jadine Wong, Rhonda Fultz	United States		
Jonathan	Hans Geissendorfer	Jürgen Jung, Hans-Dieter Jendreyko	West Germany		
Lokis	Janusz Majewski	Józef Duriasz, Edmund Fetting, Gustaw Lutkiewicz	Poland		
Love, Vampire Style	Helmut Förnbacher	Patrick Jordan, Herbert Fux, Eva Renzi	West Germany	aka The Amorous Adventures of a Young Postman	
Mark of the Devil	Michael Armstrong	Herbert Lom, Olivera Vuco, Udo Kier	West Germany		
Mumsy, Nanny, Sonny, and Girly	Freddie Francis	Michael Bryant, Ursula Howells, Pat Heywood	United Kingdom	aka Girly (USA)	
The Revenge of Dr. X	Kenneth G. Crane	James Craig, James Yagi	United States; Japan	aka Venus Flytrap	
Ritual of Evil	Robert Day	Louis Jourdan	United States	Television film; Sequel to Fear No Evil	
Scars of Dracula	Roy Ward Baker	Christopher Lee, Dennis Waterman, Jenny Hanley	United Kingdom		
Scream of the Demon Lover	José Luis Merino	Erna Schürer, Carlos Quiney, Agostina Belli	Italy; Spain	aka Ivanna	
Tam-Lin	Roddy McDowall	Ava Gardner, Ian McShane, Richard Wattis	United Kingdom	Alternative title(s): The Devil's Widow	
Taste the Blood of Dracula	Peter Sasdy	Christopher Lee, Linda Hayden, Martin Jarvis	United Kingdom		
Trog	Freddie Francis	Joan Crawford, Michael Gough, Bernard Kay	United Kingdom		
Valerie and Her Week of Wonders	Jaromil Jireš	Jaroslava Schallerová, Helena Anýžová, Karel Engel	Czechoslovakia		
The Vampire Lovers	Roy Ward Baker	Ingrid Pitt, George Cole, Kate O'Mara	United Kingdom; United States		
La Vampire Nue (aka The Nude Vampire)	Jean Rollin	Caroline Cartier, Olivier Rollin, Maurice Lemaitre	France		
El Vampiro de la autopista	José Luis Madrid	Waldemar Wohlfahrt, Patricia Loran, Luis Iduni	Spain		
The Vampire Doll	Michio Yamamoto	Kayo Matsuo, Yukiko Kobayashi, Yoko Minazake	Japan		
The Werewolf Versus Vampire Women	León Klimovsky	Paul Naschy, Gaby Fuchs, Barbara Capell	Spain; West Germany		
Witchhammer (Kladivo na čarodějnice)	Otakar Vávra	Elo Romančík, Vladimír Šmeral	Czechoslovakia		
The Wizard of Gore	Herschell Gordon Lewis	Ray Sager, Judy Cler, Wayne Ratay	United States		
Women and Bloody Terror	Joy N. Houck Jr.	Georgine Darcy, Marcus J. Grapes, Michael Anthony	United States		

== Sources ==
- Albright, Brian (2008). Wild Beyond Belief!: Interviews with Exploitation Filmmakers of the 1960s and 1970s. Jefferson, North Carolina: McFarland. ISBN 978-0-786-43689-7.
- Browning, John Edgar; Picart, Caroline Joan (2010). Dracula in Visual Media: Film, Television, Comic Book and Electronic Game Appearances, 1921–2010. Jefferson, North Carolina: McFarland. ISBN 978-0-7864-3365-0.
- Chibnall, Steve; Petley, Julian, eds. (2002). British Horror Cinema. New York City, New York: Routledge. ISBN 978-0-415-23003-2.
- Deal, David (2007). Television Fright Films of the 1970s. Jefferson, North Carolina: McFarland. ISBN 978-0-786-42929-5.
- Hardy, Phil, ed. (1995). The Overlook Film Encyclopedia. Vol. 3. Overlook Press. ISBN 0-87951-624-0.
- Holte, James Craig (1997). Dracula in the dark: the Dracula film adaptations. Westport, Connecticut: Greenwood Publishing Group. ISBN 0-313-29215-9.
- Horton, Andrew (1998). Play It Again, Sam: Retakes on Remakes. Berkeley, California: University of California Press. ISBN 0-520-20593-6.
- Hutchings, Peter (2009). The A to Z of Horror Cinema. Lanham, Maryland: Scarecrow Press. ISBN 978-0-810-87050-5.
- Muir, John Kenneth (2007). Horror Films of the 1970s. Jefferson, North Carolina: McFarland. ISBN 978-0-786-49156-8.
- Schneider, Steven Jay (2007). 100 European Horror Films. British Film Institute. ISBN 978-1-84457-164-2.
- Shelley, Peter (2009). Grande Dame Guignol Cinema: A History of Hag Horror from Baby Jane to Mother. McFarland. ISBN 978-0-7864-4569-1.
- Stanley, John (2000). Creature Features: The Science Fiction, Fantasy, and Horror Movie Guide. New York: Berkley Boulevard Books. ISBN 978-0-425-17517-0.
- Stine, Scott Aaron (2015). The Gorehound's Guide to Splatter Films of the 1960s and 1970s. Jefferson, North Carolina: McFarland. ISBN 978-0-786-49140-7.
- Young, R. G. (2000). The Encyclopedia of Fantastic Film: Ali Baba to Zombies. Hal Leonard Corporation. ISBN 1-55783-269-2.
