= The Story of Jacob and Joseph =

- Genre: Biblical fiction
- Based on: Book of Genesis
- Written by: Ernest Kinoy
- Directed by: Michael Cacoyannis
- Starring: Keith Michell; Tony Lo Bianco; Colleen Dewhurst; Herschel Bernardi; Harry Andrews; Julian Glover
- Narrated by: Alan Bates
- Theme music composer: Mikis Theodorakis
- Country of origin: United States
- Original languages: English; Greek

Production
- Producers: Mildred Freed Alberg; Rony Yacov
- Cinematography: Ted Moore; Austin Dempster
- Editor: Kevin Connor
- Running time: 110 minutes
- Production companies: Mildred Theatrical Productions; Screen Gems

Original release
- Network: ABC
- Release: April 7, 1974

The Story of Jacob and Joseph is a 1974 American Biblical television film directed by Michael Cacoyannis, based on the Biblical Book of Genesis with a screenplay written by Ernest Kinoy. It stars Keith Michell as Jacob, Tony Lo Bianco as Joseph, Colleen Dewhurst as Rebekah, Herschel Bernardi as Laban, Harry Andrews as Isaac, and Julian Glover as Esau.

Filmed on location in Israel, The Story of Jacob and Joseph originally aired in the United States on the American Broadcasting Company on April 7, 1974. It was the fifth-highest viewed prime time program for the week. The Biblical narrative was continued two years later with The Story of David (1976), also produced for ABC-TV and involving many of the same cast and crew.

== Plot summary ==
This film is the narrative of two Biblical patriarchs: Jacob (Israel) and the favorite among Jacob's 12 sons, Joseph. Part I, The Story of Jacob, details the story of Jacob fleeing his tribe after cheating his brother Esau out of his birthright, getting cheated himself in his exile years, and learning of the need to make amends. Part II, The Story of Joseph and his Brothers, is the story of Jacob's favourite son, Joseph. Betrayed and sold into slavery by his brothers, he meets and overcomes adversity to become the prime minister of Egypt, closest official to the Pharaoh himself.

== Cast ==
- Keith Michell as Jacob
- Tony Lo Bianco as Joseph
- Colleen Dewhurst as Rebekah
- Herschel Bernardi as Laban
- Harry Andrews as Isaac
- Julian Glover as Esau
- Yosef Shiloach as Pharaoh
- Yossi Graber as Butler
- Yona Elian as Rachel
- Rachel Shore as Potiphar's Wife
- Amnon Meskin as Baker
- Bennes Mardenn as Potiphar (credited as Bennes Maarden)
- Zila Carni as Leah (credited as Zila Karney)
- Yehuda Efroni as Reuben
- Shmuel Atzmon as Judah
- Eli Cohen as Gad
- Moti Baharav as Dan
- Ilan Dar as Simeon
- Menahem Einy as Benjamin
- Alan Bates as Narrator
