= James Hirsch =

James Hirsch may refer to:

- James S. Hirsch, American journalist and author
- James G. Hirsch (1922–1987), American physician and biomedical researcher
