= Blood Rites =

Blood Rites may refer to:

- Blood Rites (novel), a 2004 novel by Jim Butcher
- Blood Rites (film), a 1968 American film
- Blood Rites, a 2012 novel by S. J. Rozan

== See also ==
- Blood ritual, any ritual that involves the intentional release of blood
