= Dirk Weiler =

German actor and singer

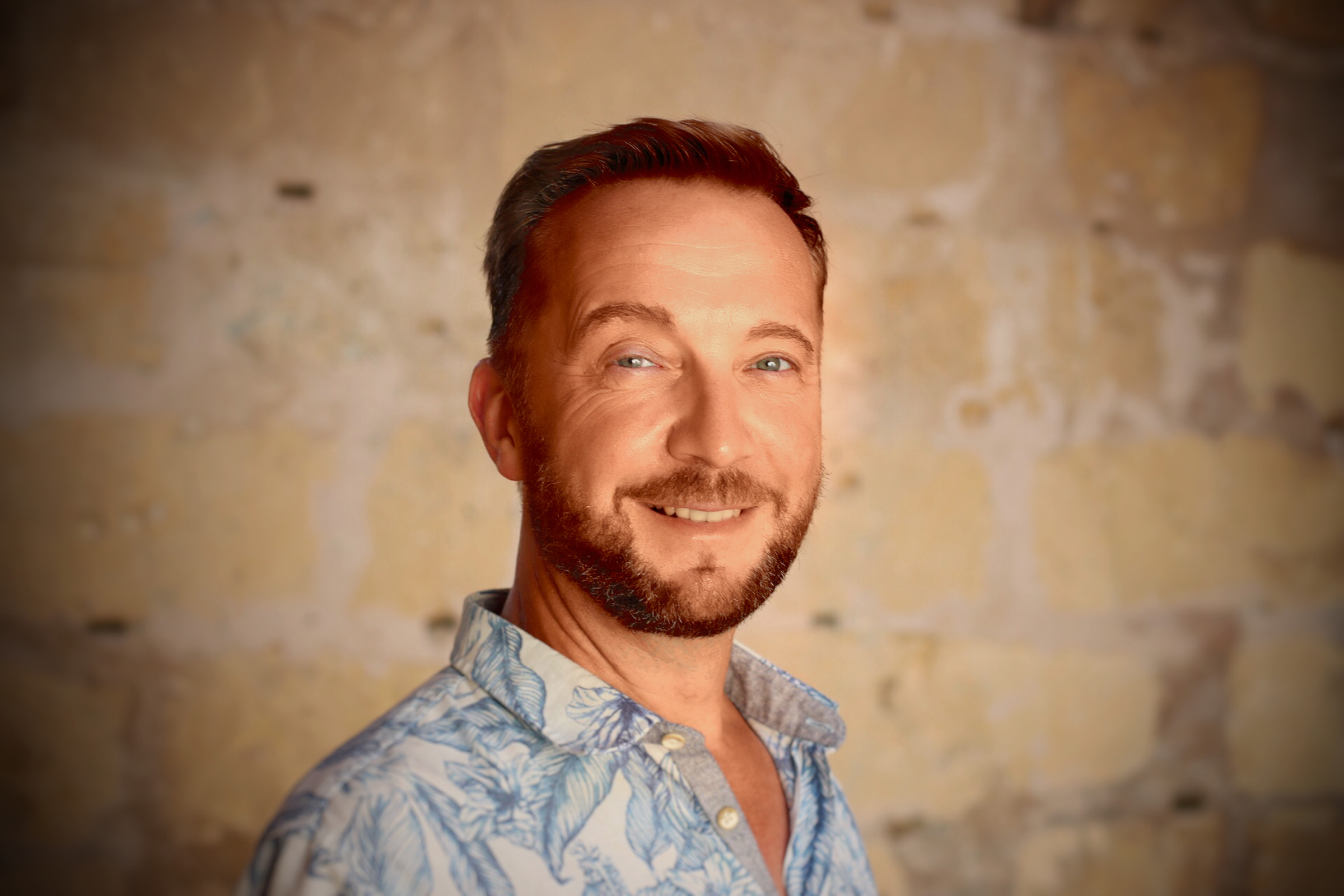
- Dirk Weiler – Actor, Singer
- Education: Folkwang University of the Arts, Manhattan School of Music, City College of New York, Brooklyn College, Acting: Expressions Theatre School (Bernice Loren), Bennes Mardenn
- Occupations: Actor, Singer
- Website: www.dirkweiler.com

Dirk Weiler is a German actor and singer.

== Biography ==
Dirk Weiler is a German-born actor and singer. He showed an interest in the performing arts from an early age. He participated in school and community theatre productions. Dirk's first part in a production at a bigger theatre was the role of the bartender and prisoner Pudritzky in Der Hauptmann von Köpenick at the Saarländisches Staatstheater in Saarbrücken. While enrolled at the Universität des Saarlandes in Saarbrücken in German literature, linguistics and phonetics, he worked as an extra at the Saarländisches Staatstheater. He then studied Acting, Singing and Dancing at the Folkwang Academy in Essen, Germany from 1990 to 1994 and graduated with a Diplom as Bühnendarsteller.

Having already worked for two years as performer with the dance theater group of Claudia Lichtblau (he was one of the lead performers in her pieces: Rothegang/Untergrund; Sequenzen; Chrom-Rauten; Gewoell; Rus-Rums-Ravas), he then enrolled in the dance department of the Folkwang Hochschule where he studied for another year with Jean Cébron. He worked with Claudia Lichtblau until 1999 while teaching tap dance at Musical Theatre Department of the Folkwang Hochschule.

In 1998, he went to New York City where he studied voice at Manhattan School of Music, City College of New York, and finally at the Conservatory of Music at Brooklyn College, where he received his Master of Music in 2001.

He was selected to participate in master classes with Walter Berry and Cord Garben. In New York he also studied acting with Bernice Loren in her "Expressions" Theater School and with Bennes Mardenn, who himself was trained be the famous Group Theatre. In 1999 he won 2nd prize at the Lotte Lenya Competition for Singers in the United States and became known as an excellent Kurt Weill interpreter (Three Penny Opera, Johnny Johnson, Wall to Wall Marathon Kurt Weill at Symphony Space New York) and was a member of the Kabarett Kollektif which won the 2006 Nightlife Award for Most Unique Cabaret Performance.

His teachers include Judy Ann Bassing, Walter Nicks, Noelle Turner, Bennes Mardenn, Bernice Loren, Cornelius Reid, Ira Siff, and Ted Puffer.

He performed musical theater, opera as well as dramatic plays and cabaret shows in Germany, New York City, Australia and London.

He was a founding member of thedramaloft, an entertainment incubator located in New York City, as well as an avid tap dancer and instructor. In New York, he has taught at the Alvin Ailey School (Alvin Ailey American Dance Theater), Steps on Broadway, and at the Bridge for Dance.

He played among many other roles Macheath in the Three Penny Opera, Psychiatrist in Johnny Johnson, Danilo in The Merry Widow, Schaunard in La Bohème, Papageno in Wolfgang Amadeus Mozarts The Magic Flute, Dutch Schultz in theUS Concert Premier of Eric Salzmann's The True Last Words Of Dutch Schultz, als Understudy Dr. Dillamonth and The Wizard of Oz in Wicked, as Understudy Joey and Monsignore O'Hare in Sister Act, King Herod in Jesus Christ Superstar. Having worked between New York and London from 2006 to 2008, he then moved to London and lived there until 2009 from where he then went to Berlin. He is currently performing in theaters in Germany as actor and singer and works as freelance coach for actors and singers.

== Awards and Scholarships ==
- 1999: 2. Prize at the Lotte Lenya Competition for Singers of the Kurt Weill Foundation for Music in New York
- 2006: Night Life Award for Unique Cabaret Performance together with the Kabarett Kollektif in New York
- 2001: International Vocal Arts Institute – Full Scholarship: Summer Course Casalmaggiore, Italy

== Engagements ==
- Comedian Harmonists in Concert (Host); Deutsche Oper am Rhein, 2020
- The Game of Love and Chance – Play (Monsigneur Orgon); Freilichtspiele Schwäbisch Hall, 2020
- Frau Luna - Operetta (Lämmermeier), Staatstheater Darmstadt, 2020
- Catch Me If You Can (Frank Abagnale Senior, Agent Branton), Staatstheater Darmstadt, 2019
- The Producers - Musical (Roger DeBris); Staatstheater Mainz, 2019
- Twelfth Night – Play (Feste, the Fool); Freilichtspiele Schwäbisch Hall, 2019
- Ewig Jung – Play with Music (Mr. Weiler); Freilichtspiele Schwäbisch Hall, 2019
- Catch Me If You Can – Musical (Frank Abagnale Senior, Agent Branton); Staatsoper Nürnberg, 2018
- William Tell – Play (Baumgarten, Reling, Friesshardt); Freilichtspiele Schwäbisch Hall, 2018
- Frau Luna – Operetta (Theophil); Theater Dortmund, 2018
- Moby Dick – Play with Music (Captain Ahab, Peleg a. o.); Musiktheater im Revier, Gelsenkirchen, 2017
- Don Camillo and Peppone – Play (Jesus); Freilichtspiele Schwäbisch Hall, 2017/18
- Die Wahlverwandtschaften – Play based on J.W. Goethe (Otto); Freilichtspiele Schwäbisch Hall, 2017
- Linie 1 – Musical; Musiktheater im Revier, Gelsenkirchen 2017
- The Merry Widow (Franz Lehar) – Operetta (Njegus); Musiktheater im Revier, Gelsenkirchen 2016-2017
- The Cherry Orchard (Anton Chechov) - Play (Petja Trofimow); Gandersheimer Domfestspiele 2016
- Highway to Hellas (Wolff/Schimkat/Doll/Lippmann) World Premiere - Musical (Jörg Geißner); Gandersheimer Domfestspiele 2016
- Crazy for You - Musical (Bobby Child); Theater Magdeburg February 2015 - May 2015
- La Cage aux Folles - Musical (Albin/Zaza); Oper Bonn September 2014 - April 2015
- Sister Act- Musical (Ensemble, u/s Joey, Monsignore O'Hara); Stage Metronom Theater Oberhausen December 2013 - April 2014
- Jesus Christ Superstar – Musical (King Herod/Apostle); Oper Bonn October 2013 – July 2014*Sister Act- Musical (Ensemble, u/s Joey, Monsignore O'Hara); Stage Apollo Theater Stuttgart December 2012 – September 2013
- CHESS – Musical (Anatoly Sergievsky); Domfestspiele Bad Gandersheim 2012 – June–August 2012
- Blond Girl Undercover (Dr. No); Domfestspiele Bad Gandersheim 2012 – June–August 2012
- The Full Monty – Musical (Harold Nichols); Theater Dortmund October 2011 – June 2012
- Wicked The Witches of Oz – Musical (Frex/Oz Official, understudy Dr. Dillamonth, Wizard of Oz); Metronom Theater Oberhausen March 2010 – September 2011
- Gandersheimer Domfestspiele; Und Es War Sommer (Helmut Kaiser)/Im Weissen Rössl (Dr. Siedler); Gandersheimer Domfestspiele, Bad Gandersheim 2009
- Berlin-Hanover-Express; Tap Dance Coach and Choreographer: Dirk Weiler; Hampstead Theatre, London 2009
- The School For Scandal(Moses); Red Handed Theatre Company; Bridewell Theatre, London 2009
- Song Interpretations Workshop; Musical Theatre Department, Folkwang Hochschule Essen, 2008
- Tap Dance Workshop; Bridge for Dance, New York City, 2008
- Film: Evil Eye (The Roommate-Lead); New York City 2008
- Film: I'm Afraid I am Hitler (Officer Mohnke); New York City 2008
- Song-Interpretation Workshop; Musical Theatre Department Folkwang Hochschule Essen 2007
- Tap Dance Workshop; Nomadic College in Europe; Balaton, Hungary, 2007
- Right Key ... Wrong Keyhole; An evening with Songs of Gigolos and Gigolettes; Helen's Hideaway Room, New York City 2007
- THE TRUE LAST WORDS OF DUTCH SCHULTZ (Dutch Schultz); Symphony Space's Wall to Wall Opera, New York City 2007
- QUEER BENT FOR THE TUDOR GENT (Richard); The American Globe Theatre New York City 2007
- The Merry Widow; directed and choreographed by Dirk Weiler; Mason Gross School of the Arts at Rutgers University, New Brunswick, NJ 2007
- THE WAITER; Dirk Weiler & Janie Blackburn with Simon Mulligan, piano; The Jermyn Street Theatre London, 2006
- NOISE & SMOKE: HITS OF WEIMAR BERLIN; Dirk Weiler & Karen Kohler with John Bowen, piano; International Cabaret Festival, Adelaide, Australia, 2006
- RUBIROSA A New Musical by Sandra Hochman and Gary Kupper (Porfirio Rubirosa); Staged Readings, Michael Carson Studios, New York 2006
- NOISE & SMOKE: HITS OF WEIMAR BERLIN; Dirk Weiler & Karen Kohler with John Bowen, piano, German General Consulate New York 2006
- NOISE & SMOKE: HITS OF WEIMAR BERLIN; Dirk Weiler & Karen Kohler with John Bowen, piano, Helen's Hideaway Room. New York 2005
- On the Banks of the Surreal; Five short plays from the early 20th century, The Bank Street Theater in NYC 2005
- The True Last Words of Dutch Schultz (Dutch Schultz); The Center for Contemporary Opera as part of "On The Edge" at Symphony Space's Thalia Theatre 2005
- Tap Dance Instruction Videos; Dirk Weiler as Assistant und Tap Dancer for Judy Ann Bassing; Bodarc Productions in New York 2005
- The Three Penny Opera (Macheath); The Brooklyn College Department of Theater and the Conservatory of Music, Celebration of Brooklyn College’s 75th Birthday, 2005
- Nothing without our Pride; Short Film by Sheila Simmons, New York 2004
- The Kabarett Kollektif; European Cabaretists in New York; Mama Rose's, NYC 2004
- Kabarett Kollektif Salon; featuring Dirk Weiler along with New York's finest European-born cabaret artists; Home of Frank and Mary Skillern, New York 2004
- A World with Snow by Jack Canfora; Dirk Weiler and Jack Canfora co-direct a reading of Jack Canfora's new play "A World with Snow" at the Revelation Theatre in New York City 2004
- Kabarett Kollektif; Duplex Cabaret Theatre, 61 Christopher St (at 7th Ave.), NY 2003
- Dirk Weiler at Café Sabarsky; with Lucy Arner, piano, Neue Galerie 1048 Fifth Avenue, NYC 2003
- After Hours A New Musical Revue (Frank); Lion Theatre at Theatre Row 410 West 42nd Street, NYC 2003
- Place Setting a new play by Jack Canfora (Richard); Equity Showcase at Center Stage New York City 2003
- Place Setting a new play by Jack Canfora (Richard); Reading at Stella Adler Studios in New York 2003
- Audition Workshop; Musical Theatre Department, Folkwang Hochschule Essen 2003
- Blue Monday, George Gershwin; Graduate Center CUNY, New York Dirk Weiler as Tom/Tap Dancer 2003
- The Heart of Biddy Mason (Tap Dancer/Singer); New York City Lesung; Staged reading at Shettler Studios, New York 2003
- Johnny Johnson by Kurt Weill; Bruno Walter Auditorium; Kurt Weill Foundation of Music 2002
- A Tribute to George Gershwin; Hosted by Eli Wallach, The Graduate Center New York 2002
- Benefit Concert for Zonta Club 1; Lieder, American Art Songs and American Popular Songs; Neue Aula of the Folkwang Hochschule 2002
- The Magic Flute, W.A. Mozart (Papageno); Brooklyn, New York 2001
- La Bohème by G. Puccini (Schaunard); Casalmaggiore, Italy – Dirk Weiler IVAI scholarship 2001
- The Merry Widow, Franz Léhar (Danilo); Brooklyn, New York 2001
- Kurt Weill Symposium; Meredith College Raleigh North Carolina 2001
- Die Dreigroschenoper Brecht/Weill (Macheath); Staged Concert Version, Manhattan School of Music in New York City 2001
- Le Nozze di Figaro by W.A. Mozart (Count Almaviva); Brooklyn, New York, 2000
- "Wall to Wall Kurt Weill"; 12 Hour Marathon Hommage to Kurt Weill, Symphony Space Broadway and 95th Street, NYC 2000
- Winners Concert 92nd Street Y- Theatre; 2000
- Tap Dance Teaching Videos; Tap Dance Instruction Videos as Tap Dancer und Assistant of Judy Ann Bassing, Miami und New York 1999
- Claudia Lichtblau Dance Company, Essen, Rothegang/Untergrund, Sequenzen, Rauten, Chrom, Gewöll, Rus-Rums-Ravas 1992–2000
