= No Place to Run (film) =

1972 film by Delbert Mann

- Genre: Drama
- Written by: James G. Hirsch
- Directed by: Delbert Mann
- Starring: Herschel Bernardi; Stefanie Powers; Larry Hagman
- Music by: George Aliceson Tipton
- Country of origin: United States
- Original language: English

Production
- Executive producers: Aaron Spelling; Leonard Goldberg
- Producer: Paul Junger Witt
- Cinematography: Gene Milford
- Editor: Ralph Woolsey
- Running time: 74 minutes
- Production companies: ABC Circle Films; Spelling-Goldberg Productions

Original release
- Network: ABC
- Release: September 19, 1972

No Place to Run is a 1972 American made-for-television drama film directed by Delbert Mann for ABC Movie of the Week and starring Herschel Bernardi, Stefanie Powers and Larry Hagman.

== Plot ==
An adopted boy's parents are killed, and to keep him from returning to the state's custody, he and his grandfather run away.

== Cast ==
- Herschel Bernardi as Hyam Malsh
- Stefanie Powers as Bonnie Howard
- Larry Hagman as Jay Fox
- Neville Brand as Remis
- Tom Bosley as Dr Sam Golinski
- Scott Jacoby as Doug
- Kay Medford as Landlady
- Robert Donner as Car salesman
- Wesley Lau as Bill Ryan
- Woodrow Parfrey as Motel manager
- Will J. White as Highway Patrolman
- Curt Conway as Old man #1
- Peter Brocco as Old man #2
- Larry Watson as Cabbie
- Frank White as Construction worker
- Wesley E. Barry II as Young helper

== See also ==
- List of American films of 1972
