= Berwick Kaler =

British actor and pantomime dame (born 1946)

- Born: Raymond Berwick Kaler; 31 October 1946 (age 79); Sunderland, County Durham, England
- Occupations: Actor, writer, director
- Known for: York Theatre Royal's annual pantomime

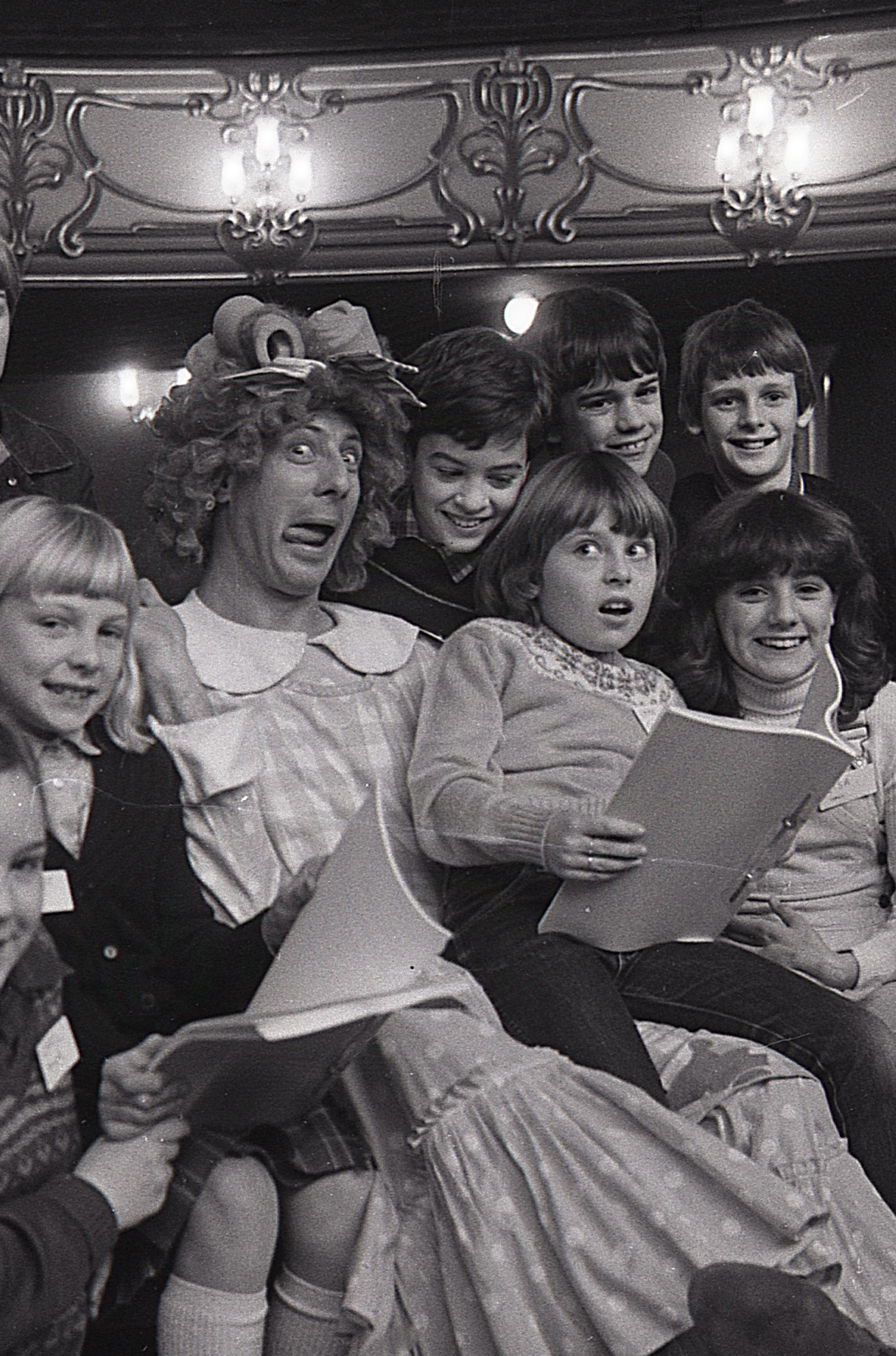
Berwick Kaler, York Theatre Royal 1992

Berwick Kaler (born 31 October 1946) is a British actor most famous for playing the dame in York Theatre Royal's annual pantomime, which he also wrote and directed until 2020. In 2021 he parted ways with York Theatre Royal and took his brand of traditional panto to the York Grand Opera House. He has been awarded the freedom of the city, and in 2002 received an honorary degree from the University of York.

Having grown up in "the slums of Sunderland", Kaler left school at 15 to seek success on the London stage. He got taken on at Dreamland Margate to learn his trade. As a young actor, he also appeared in five low-budget films for cult director Andy Milligan. He has had TV roles in such shows as The New Statesman, Crocodile Shoes, Auf Wiedersehen, Pet and Spender as well as steady theatre work. However, it is his role in the York pantomime that has won him the most acclaim.

Many pantomimes in recent years have relied heavily on celebrity guest stars and risque humour. Kaler's pantos rejected this and harked back to a more traditional form of pantomime. Kaler comments: "I want everyone to laugh at the same joke". Kaler's central role in writing, producing and directing led Dominic Cavendish of The Telegraph to call him the "panto's biggest asset and its biggest liability." Kaler also assembled a cast of actors who regularly returned to the panto, notably Martin Barrass (as the dame's son), David Leonard (villain), Suzy Cooper (principal girl) and AJ Powell (supporting comic).

Towards the end of each pantomime at the York Theatre Royal, Kaler threw Wagon Wheels, as one might a Frisbee, to the audience, as well as handing out a bottle of Newcastle Brown Ale to a father seated in the stalls.

In November 2010 Kaler followed in the footsteps of actress Jean Alexander and TV presenter Harry Gration in switching on the Christmas lights in the village of Burn. In recognition of the village's Victorian market he dressed as Queen Victoria, something he often does in each pantomime. During the event, he was appointed Honorary Dame of Burn.

In 2012, he was featured on the documentary Michael Grade's History of the Pantomime Dame, which also featured clips from the 2011 pantomime The York Family Robinson, a parody of the novel The Swiss Family Robinson by Johann David Wyss. The programme aired in December 2012 on BBC Four.

He officially retired from the pantomime in February 2019 with The Grand Old Dame of York. His 'glitterball' costume from the production was donated to York Castle Museum and went on public display on 1 May 2019. Another of his costumes from The Grand Old Dame of York has been exhibited at the Victoria and Albert Museum. Despite retiring, Kaler was still heavily involved in the 2019 panto Sleeping Beauty, as he wrote the script, co-directed (with Matt Aston) and appeared via films that were screened on stage. The panto was poorly received and led to the Theatre Royal seeking a change of direction for their future pantomimes, citing poor ticket sales as the main reason (something Kaler disputed). This led to an acrimonious split with the Theatre Royal which became known as 'Panto Wars'.

Berwick left retirement in 2021 to reunite with his cast members for Dick Turpin Rides Again at a new venue, The Grand Opera House, York, after changes to the York Theatre Royal creative team. However, he was forced to pull out of the final performances after testing positive for COVID-19 and wrote a letter, read out during the final performance, by fellow cast member David Leonard.

On 26 February 2024, Kaler announced his retirement, following the Grand Opera House's Christmas 2023 production of Robinson Crusoe, saying: "After 47 years getting away with complete nonsense it’s time to bow out gracefully."

In January 2025, he appeared as himself in several episodes of BBC Radio 4's The Archers.

== Selected appearances ==
- Michael Grade's History of the Pantomime Dame (2012, TV) as himself.
- A Knight's Tale (2001) as man in stocks
- The Worst Witch (1998–1999, TV) as Frank Blossom. Left after Series 2.
- Jude (1996)
- Spender (1991–1993, TV) as Detective Sergeant Dan Boyd
- A Very British Coup (1988, TV) as Smith
- Annie Get Your Gun (1986, theatre) as Foster Wilson and Chief Sitting Bull
- The Man With Two Heads (1972)
- The Rats Are Coming! The Werewolves Are Here! (1971)
- Nightbirds (1970)
- Bloodthirsty Butchers (1970)
- The Body Beneath (1970)
