= Arnie (TV series) =

American television sitcom

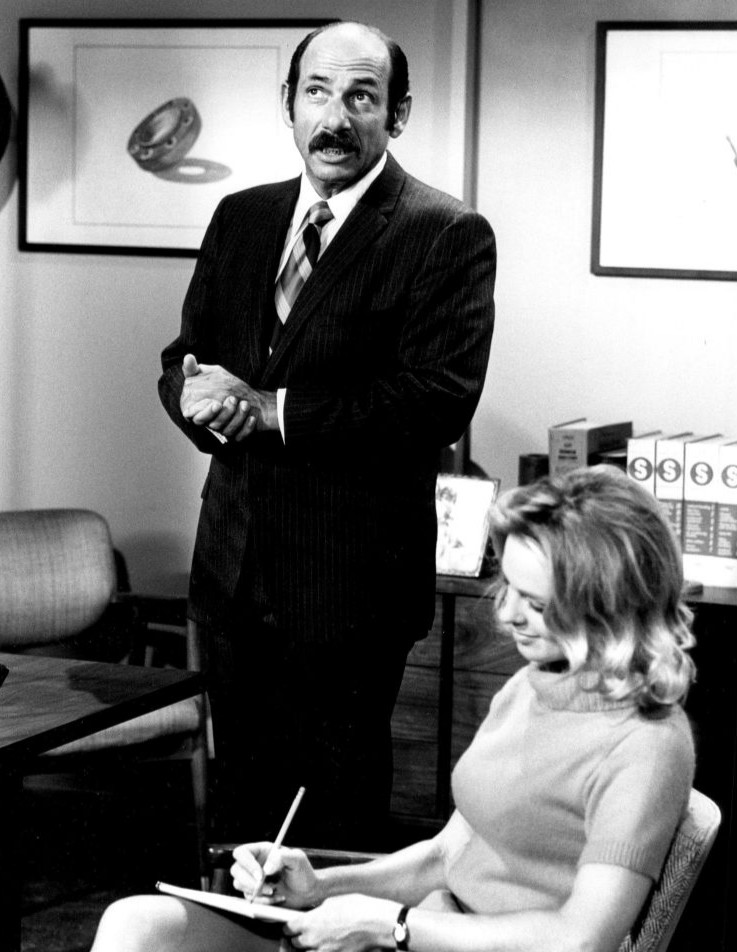
- Herschel Bernardi as Arnie
- Created by: David Swift
- Developed by: E. Duke Vincent
- Starring: Herschel Bernardi; Sue Ane Langdon; Roger Bowen; Herb Voland
- Country of origin: United States
- Original language: English
- No. of seasons: 2
- No. of episodes: 48

Production
- Producer: Rick Mittleman
- Camera setup: Single-camera
- Running time: 25 minutes
- Production company: 20th Century-Fox Television

Original release
- Network: CBS
- Release: September 19, 1970 – March 11, 1972

Arnie is an American television sitcom that ran for two seasons (1970–72) on CBS. It starred Herschel Bernardi, Sue Ane Langdon, and Roger Bowen.

Bernardi played the title character, Arnie Nuvo, a longtime blue-collar employee at the fictitious Continental Flange Company, who is promoted overnight to an executive position. The story lines mainly focused on this fish-out-of-water situation, and on Arnie's sometimes-problematic relationship with his well-meaning but wealthy and eccentric boss, Hamilton Majors Jr. (Bowen). Because he still holds his union card, Arnie can negotiate tricky management/labor situations that no one else can.

In addition to Bernardi, Bowen, and Langdon (as his wife Lilian), cast members included Del Russel and Stephanie Steele as their son and daughter, Richard and Andrea, respectively; Elaine Shore as his secretary, Felicia; Herb Voland as sour-tempered vice president Neil Ogilvie, and Tom Pedi as his loading-dock friend, Julius. Olan Soule appeared occasionally as Fred Springer, another vice president.

In its first season, despite being the lead-in to The Mary Tyler Moore Show on Saturday nights and winning an Emmy nomination as best comedy series, Arnie received only fair Nielsen ratings. For its second season, to increase its viewership, CBS made a major cast change in the show's format. Dick Van Patten was dropped as the Nuvos' next-door neighbor, and Charles Nelson Reilly joined the cast as Randy Robinson, a TV chef who called himself "The Giddyap Gourmet", an obvious reference to The Galloping Gourmet. On an episode of Match Game, Reilly claimed that The Galloping Gourmet sued.

Also, the network decided to move the show to Monday nights at 10:00 pm followed at 10:30 pm by a new sitcom that had debuted in January, 1971, on Tuesday nights to mediocre ratings, All in the Family. At the last minute, a switch was made and My Three Sons left its comfortable Saturday nighttime slot and took over the 10:00 pm slot on Mondays with Arnie slotted at 10:30. Both shows sank in the ratings. All In the Family was moved to Saturday nights at 8:00, where it became the number-one show for five consecutive years. At midseason, My Three Sons was moved to Thursday nights and Arnie returned to the Saturday night primetime schedule. The changes did not help. Both shows were canceled at the end of the 1971–1972 season.

== Cast ==
- Herschel Bernardi as Arnie Nuvo
- Stephanie Steele as Andrea Nuvo
- Del Russel as Richard Nuvo
- Sue Ane Langdon as Lilian Nuvo
- Roger Bowen as Hamilton Majors Jr.

== Episodes ==
=== Season 1 (1970–71) ===
No. overall	No. in season	Title	Directed by	Written by	Original release date	Prod. code
1	1	"Pilot"	David Swift	David Swift	September 19, 1970	E-101
2	2	"An Urge to Splurge"	Allen Baron	Unknown	September 26, 1970	E-106
3	3	"Change of a Lifetime"	Jay Sandrich	Unknown	October 3, 1970	E-107
4	4	"Wife vs. Secretary"	Allen Baron	Unknown	October 10, 1970	E-104
5	5	"The Friendship Gap"	Allen Baron	Unknown	October 17, 1970	E-105
6	6	"Swinging Sixties"	Russ Mayberry	David Swift	October 24, 1970	E-108
7	7	"Trouble in the Air"	Gary Nelson	Betty Bonaduce	October 31, 1970	E-110
8	8	"Hair Today, Gone Tomorrow"	Don Richardson	Rick Mittleman	November 7, 1970	E-102
9	9	"Why Spy?"	Don Richardson	Unknown	November 14, 1970	E-113
10	10	"For Whom the Whistle Blows"	Don Richardson	Unknown	November 21, 1970	E-112
11	11	"One Strike and You're Out"	Gary Nelson	Unknown	November 28, 1970	E-111
12	12	"Sell Mates"	Don Richardson	Unknown	December 5, 1970	E-103
13	13	"Let Them Eat Cookies"	Gary Nelson	Bruce Howard	December 12, 1970	E-109
14	14	"To Buy or Not to Buy?"	Don Richardson	Unknown	December 19, 1970	E-114
15	15	"Second Honeymoon"	Alan Rafkin	Unknown	January 2, 1971	E-115
16	16	"You Can't Lose for Winning"	Coby Ruskin	Unknown	January 9, 1971	E-116
17	17	"Hello, Holly"	Allen Baron	Unknown	January 16, 1971	E-117
18	18	"Father Meets Daughter"	Don Richardson	Richard Baer	January 23, 1971	E-118
19	19	"Stand Up for Julius"	Russ Mayberry	Unknown	January 30, 1971	E-120
20	20	"Citizen Pain"	Bruce Bilson	Unknown	February 6, 1971	E-119
21	21	"Feud for Thought"	Jay Sandrich	Unknown	February 13, 1971	E-122
22	22	"Strangeness in the Night"	Russ Mayberry	Unknown	February 20, 1971	E-121
23	23	"My Sister's Keeper"	John Erman	Unknown	February 27, 1971	E-123
24	24	"No Harmony in Trying"	Richard Kinon	Unknown	March 6, 1971	E-124

=== Season 2 (1971–72) ===
No. overall	No. in season	Title	Directed by	Written by	Original release date	Prod. code
25	1	"Nuvo Riche"	Don Richardson	Art Baer, Ben Joelson	September 13, 1971	F-302
26	2	"Well, There Goes the Neighborhood"	Don Richardson	Unknown	September 20, 1971	F-303
27	3	"Honey, I'm Sorry, But..."	David Swift	Unknown	September 27, 1971	F-301
28	4	"The Maid"	Bruce Bilson	Unknown	October 4, 1971	F-307
29	5	"Welcome to the Club"	Bruce Bilson	Unknown	October 18, 1971	F-309
30	6	"Something Old, Something New, Something Borrowed, Something Blew"	Allen Baron	Unknown	October 25, 1971	F-304
31	7	"A Poem from 'Guess Who'"	Bruce Bilson	Unknown	November 1, 1971	F-308
32	8	"The Return of 'Fingers' Ferguson"	Don Richardson	Unknown	November 8, 1971	F-310
33	9	"Et Tu, Arnie"	Don Richardson	Unknown	November 15, 1971	F-311
34	10	"Pushing Pinky Out of the Treehouse"	Don Richardson	Unknown	November 22, 1971	F-306
35	11	"This Land Is My Land"	Roger Duchowny	Unknown	November 29, 1971	F-312
36	12	"Let Ham Put You in the Driver's Seat"	Roger Duchowny	Unknown	December 6, 1971	F-313
37	13	"The Gift of the Majors"	Don Richardson	Art Baer, Ben Joelson	December 18, 1971	F-314
38	14	"Boom or Bust"	Allen Baron	Unknown	January 1, 1972	F-305
39	15	"The Only Way to Go"	Don Richardson	Unknown	January 8, 1972	F-315
40	16	"Guess Who's Coming to Our House?"	Roger Duchowny	Unknown	January 15, 1972	F-316
41	17	"What's Up, Doc?"	Don Richardson	Unknown	January 22, 1972	F-317
42	18	"The Truth, the Whole Truth, and Nothing But the Truth"	Roger Duchowny	Unknown	January 29, 1972	F-318
43	19	"Room at the Top"	Don Richardson	Unknown	February 5, 1972	F-319
44	20	"Surprise, Surprise"	Roger Duchowny	Unknown	February 12, 1972	F-320
45	21	"Uncle Nikko"	Don Richardson	Unknown	February 19, 1972	F-321
46	22	"Wilson Tastes Good Like a Candidate Should"	Don Appell	Unknown	February 26, 1972	F-322
47	23	"Now You Take Teddy Roosevelt"	Don Richardson	Unknown	March 4, 1972	F-323
48	24	"Star Trekking"	Roger Duchowny	Unknown	March 11, 1972	F-324
