= The Ghastly Ones =

The Ghastly Ones can refer to:

- Blood Rites (film) (AKA The Ghastly Ones), a 1968 horror film directed by Andy Milligan
- Ghastly Ones, a California surf band formed in 1996
