= Bennes Mardenn =

American actor

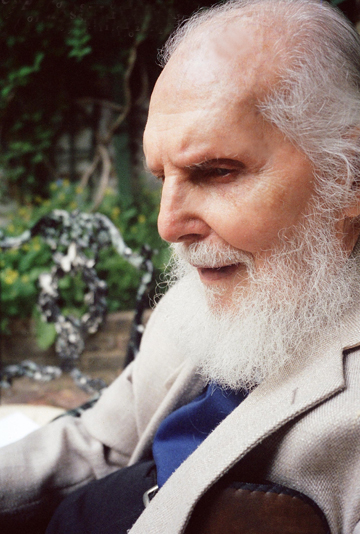
- Bennes Mardenn
- Born: January 19, 1916
- Died: May 13, 2010 (aged 94); New York, New York, U.S.
- Occupations: Actor; teacher; mentor

Bennes Mardenn (January 19, 1916 – May 13, 2010) was an American actor, director, teacher, and mentor.

== Biography ==
Bennes Mardenn was personally trained by the Group Theatre: Stella Adler, Bobby Lewis, Harold Clurman, Lee Strasberg, and his mentor, Morris Carnovsky. He moved from Philadelphia to New York in 1935.

Mardenn studied at the Dramatic Workshop with Erwin Piscator and Michael Chekhov. At The New School, he studied child psychology under Abraham Maslow, focusing on the Psychology of Being, and under Lawrence J. Stone of Vassar College to become a Creative Dramatics Specialist.

He has taught in New York, Hollywood, Rome, Tel Aviv, and Jerusalem.

In New York, Mardenn taught at Carnegie Hall, the 92nd Street YMHA, Educational Alliance, and was the Speech and Drama Director at Henry Le Tang’s Dance School. From 1958 to 1963, he acted and directed the Living Theatre Company and Repertory School.

In Hollywood, Mardenn opened a studio called the Drama Lab where he trained Talia Shire, Herschel Bernardi, Sal Mineo, Gary Crosby, Charlie Brill, Mitzi McCall, Richard Hatch, Danny Michael Mann, James Earl Jones, Diana Sands, and Kim Darby. Later, he went on to train and coach Joe Penny, Fisher Stevens, and Raphael Sparge.

In Rome, Mardenn transformed his villa into an international school of acting called the Drama Lab Europa where Joe Namath, Barbara Bouchet, and Carol Andre came to work and develop their acting. While in Rome, he was featured in Visit to Rome by Marco Ferreri, starring David Warner; also in Brother Sun, Sister Moon by Franco Zeffirelli, starring Valentini Cortese.

In Israel, Mardenn held the position of Director of Dramatic Activities and Events for the American Cultural Center. He directed Bird Bath by Leonard Melfi; Voices of Sylvia Plath at Tzavta Theatre in Tel Aviv and in Jerusalem and co-directed Shalosh at the Kahan Theatre in Jerusalem. He was featured by director, Giorgio Giulani in Moses, the Lawgiver and Sacco and Vanzetti. He also was featured by Michael Caccoyannis in Jacob and Joseph.

As an actor, he has performed with and/or been directed by Montgomery Clift, Morris Carnovsky, David Opatoshu, Bette Davis, Katharine Hepburn, Jason Robards, Colleen Dewhurst, Herschel Bernardi, Harold Gould, John Randolf, Milo O’Shea, Ruby Dee, Ozzie Davis, James Farentino, Canada Lee, Didi Pheiffer, J.D. Cullum, Keanu Reeves, Sal Mineo, Burl Ives, James Earl Jones, Martin Sheen, Judith Malina, Julian Beck, Joe Chaikin, George Bartenieff, Ed Asner, and Zsa Zsa Gabor.

== Famous works ==
=== Stage appearances ===
- 1963 The Connection [Off-Broadway] Jim Dunn
- 1960 In the Jungle of Cities [Off-Broadway] C. Maynes
- 1960 The Theatre of Chance [Off-Broadway] Ancient King II: David (marrying Maiden)

=== Film/TV ===
- 1995 The Golem (short) Grandfather
- 1974 The Story of Jacob and Joseph (TV movie) Potiphar
- 1972 Cool Million (TV series) – Pilot (1972)
- 1970 Blood of the Iron Maiden
- 1969 The Bold Ones: The Lawyers (TV series) Doctor Sloan
- 1969 The Whole World Is Watching Doctor Sloan

== Students ==
- Herschel Bernardi
- Charlie Brill
- G. Beaudin
- Gary Crosby
- Kim Darby
- Richard Hatch
- James Earl Jones
- Danny Michael Mann
- Mitzi McCall
- Sal Mineo
- Joe Penny
- Diana Sands
- Talia Shire
- Raphael Sparge
- Fisher Stevens
- Dirk Weiler
- Tom Wallace
