= Rick Mittleman =

American screenwriter

- Born: April 18, 1930
- Died: July 30, 2014 (aged 84); Los Angeles, California, U.S.
- Occupation: Writer
- Years active: 1955–2014?

Rick Mittleman (April 18, 1930 – July 30, 2014) was an American screenwriter known for Bewitched, The Red Skelton Show, and many other TV series.

== Career ==
Mittleman started out on the TV series You Asked for It. He was nominated for an Emmy Award three times, in 1963 for The Red Skelton Show, in 1971 for Arnie, and in 1976 for Van Dyke and Company.

His other credits include The Dick Van Dyke Show, The Mary Tyler Moore Show, Get Smart, Bewitched, McHale's Navy, The Donna Reed Show, Petticoat Junction, The Doris Day Show, The Courtship of Eddie's Father, That Girl, Welcome Back, Kotter, Sanford and Son, Gomer Pyle, USMC, I Spy, Emergency!, A Touch of Grace, The Practice (1976–1977), CHiPs, Remington Steele, Matlock, MacGyver, Simon & Simon, and Murder, She Wrote. He was also on the board of directors of the Writers Guild of America. He died in 2014, aged 84.
