= Nightbirds (film) =

1970 British film

- Theatrical film poster
- Directed by: Andy Milligan
- Written by: Andy Milligan
- Produced by: Leslie Elliot
- Starring: Berwick Kaler; Julie Shaw; Elaine Shore; Bill Clancy; Bay White
- Cinematography: Andy Milligan
- Edited by: Andy Milligan
- Production company: Cinemedia Films
- Release dates: February 1, 1970 (USA); March 1, 1970 (UK)
- Running time: 107 mins.
- Country: United Kingdom
- Language: English

Nightbirds is a 1970 British black and white experimental film, written and directed by Andy Milligan and starring Berwick Kaler, Julie Shaw, Bill Clancy, Elaine Shore, Bay White, Susan McCormick, Tom Houlden, and Susan Heard.

== Synopsis ==
While living rough on the streets of London's East End, a young man name Dink encounters the mysterious Dee and they begin a relationship. When tenderness gives way to cruelty, they become consumed by darkness.

== Cast ==
- Berwick Kaler as Dink
- Julie Shaw as Dee
- Bill Clancy as Ginger
- Elaine Shore as Mabel
- Bay White as Dee's mother
- Susan McCormick as Rosie
- Tom Houlden as Tom
- Susan Heard as maid

== Reception ==
Kim Newman wrote in Sight and Sound: "In 1968, Milligan relocated for a spell from Staten Island to London. and made five minimally budgeted pictures with an assortment of jobbing actors, Soho pick ups and passers by. Nightbirds, originally entitled Pigeons, was an odd choice to kick off an exploitation package deal, at once ambitious and threadbare and, glimpses of nudity and frank talk notwithstanding, unsaleable as tat. ... Awkwardly played, shot through with longueurs, full of moments of obvious private significance and entirely filmed in daylight to belie the title, Nightbirds is dissociative viewing by anyone's standards but still bizarrely compelling."

In The Guardian, Nicolas Winding Refn wrote: "It's an unjustly forgotten movie that has had a film-maker's heart and soul poured into it."

Will Sloan wrote in Cinema Scope: "The London-shot Nightbirds (1970) [is] one of Milligan's few films that doesn't fit into the sexploitation or horror categories. ... The films ends, as Milligan films so often do, with betrayal and death."

Douglas Buck of Off-Screen commends director Andy Milligan for "managing a more tempered hand, dialing back the usual histrionics".

Graeme Clark of The Spinning Image rates the film 5/10 stars, citing its intentions to make a "serious drama" by putting the central couple's "capricious personalities under the microscope".

The website Nostalgia Central praises the performances of leads Berwick Kaler and Julie Shaw, particularly the latter for her "sociopathic performance".

== Home media ==
The film was released in the BFI Flipside series (Flipside 023, 2012).
