= Del Russel =

American actor (1952–2015)

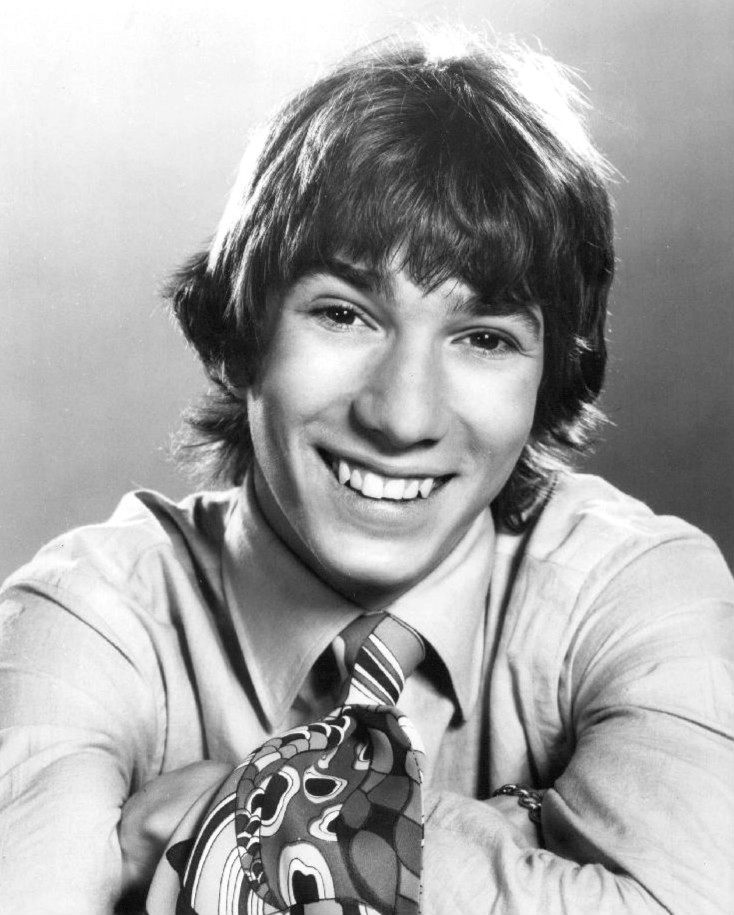
- Del Russel in 1970 TV publicity photo
- Born: Del Gregory Russel; September 27, 1952; Pasadena, California, U.S.
- Died: February 7, 2015 (aged 62); Santa Rosa, California, U.S.
- Occupation: Actor
- Years active: 1959–1991

Del Russel (born Del Gregory Russo; September 27, 1952 – February 7, 2015) was an American actor and the son of actor Tony Russel and Jodean Lawrence.

== Filmography ==
Year	Title	Role	Notes
1959-1960	Men into Space	Johnny McCauley	2 episodes
1961	Tammy Tell Me True	Harold	Uncredited
1963	Cleopatra	Caesarion at Age 7	Uncredited
1970-1972	Arnie	Richard Nuvo	18 episodes
1971	The Hard Ride	Nico	
1972	Owen Marshall: Counselor at Law	Mack Sturdevant	1 episode
1974	Indict and Convict	Frank Rogers	TV movie
1974	The Last Angry Man	Vinnie Parelli	TV movie
1979	The Late Great Planet Earth	Jeremiah	Documentary
1979	CHiPs	Donny Joe King	1 episode
1980	Seizure: The Story of Kathy Morris	Musician #1	TV movie
1983	Thunder Warrior	Frank	English version, Voice, Uncredited
1984	Man Hunt	Prisoner	English version, Voice, Uncredited
1986	From Beyond	Ambulance Driver	
1986	Three Men on Fire		
1987	Rent-a-Cop	Seller	
1988	Zombi 3	Blueheart	English version, Voice, Uncredited
1988	The Last Temptation of Christ	Money Changer	
1990	Robot Jox	2nd Technician	
1991	Miliardi		(final film role)
