= Vapors (film) =

- Directed by: Andy Milligan
- Written by: Hope Stansbury
- Produced by: Andy Milligan
- Starring: See below
- Cinematography: Andy Milligan
- Edited by: Andy Milligan
- Release date: 1965
- Running time: 32 minutes
- Country: United States
- Language: English

Vapors is a 1965 short film directed by Andy Milligan and written by Hope Stansbury. The film portrays the lives and conflicts of a group of gay men set during one evening in a New York bath house for men.

== Plot ==
A young man riding a New York City bus disembarks and goes inside a building which is the St. Marks Baths. He asks for a room and is told by the clerk that the weekend price for admission is $3.50, then the average price of $2 which are on the weekdays only. He is given a white robe, towel, slippers, as well as told to deposit his wallet and valuables with the clerk before entering. He is also told that there is no food or beverages allowed in the baths or any of the rooms. The young man enters a dark room, changes into his robe, and sits on a bed looking at the vapors of the baths as other men, run past the room talking loud and behaving weirdly. Nearby, a clerk named Sam, talks with another employee about the large number of customers for this Friday night.

As the young man sits in his room, a middle-aged man enters asking if he would like some company. The middle-aged man tells the young man that this is his first time at the baths, and the young man brags about coming there three or four times a week. The middle-aged man becomes awkward and asks the younger man if he would like something to drink and offers to sneak up some coffee from the convenience store in the lobby area. After the middle-aged man leaves, two gay couples, a pair of flamboyant out-of-costume drag queens known as Miss Parrish and Mavis, as well as another couple named Thumbelina and Taffy, walk by where Miss Parrish asks the young man if he would like some company for he is all alone. The young man tells them to leave for his friend is returning. A minute or so later, the middle-aged man returns with a pair of soft drinks which he claims to be Coca-Cola and 7 Up where he serves one to the young man. The middle-aged man finally introduces himself as Mr. Jaffee, and the young man introduces himself as Thomas.

While Miss Parrish and Mavis run around talking degrading things about the other attendees to each other, the awkward conversation between Mr. Jaffee and Thomas continues. Mr. Jaffee tells Thomas that he came to the baths because he did not want to return home to his wife whom he claims to have been married to for 19 years. Thomas then confesses to Mr. Jaffee that he lied for it really is his first time at the baths for he just wanted to see what really goes on there. Mr. Jaffee refers to it as "a lunatic asylum for homosexuals".

While Taffy and Thumbelina talk outside of an intruder that walks by them, Mr. Jaffee talks about his unhappy home life to Thomas and talks about a dream he once had about women's feet and how his wife's feet are repulsive to him. Mr. Jaffee even plays with Thomas feet while reciting the nursery rhyme "this little piggy went to market". Mr. Jaffee then talks about dealing with the analysis of women's sanitary pads and Thomas tells Mr. Jaffee how when he worked in a restaurant had to fish them out of a toilet because too many women tried to flush them down which clogged the restroom toilets.

Mr. Jaffee then tells Thomas that one of the reasons he came to the bathhouse is that it is the first anniversary of his 16-year-old son's death. Mr. Jaffee delivers a disturbing monologue about his son who drowned while swimming in an upstate lake which led to the disintegration of his marriage. Mr. Jaffee spooks Thomas even more when he tells him that his appearance reminds him of his young son. Just then, Miss Parrish and Mavis, and Taffy and Thumbelina, burst into the room looking for a party. Thomas angrily tells them to leave, which they do, and Mr. Jaffee then tells Thomas that he wants to give him a gift and tells him not to leave for he will return soon. After Mr. Jaffee leaves the room again, Thomas sits on his bed for seemingly a long time, smoking a cigarette, and staring at the black ceiling, looking at the steam vapors in the room, and staring at the obscene and vulgar graffiti on the walls. Just then, the two couples return to the room with a wrapped package in which Thomas again tells them to leave and asks the whereabouts of Mr. Jaffee. The four men tell Thomas that Mr. Jaffee got dressed and left, but he asked them to deliver the package to him. Thomas opens it up to find a paper sunflower. Thomas tells the guys to leave him alone, and he sits on his bed and cries over his seemingly abandonment.

As Thomas continues to cry, a man walks by his room and peeks in asking if he is all right for he heard him crying. Thomas tells the man that he is all right. Just when the man turns around to leave, Thomas tells the man to come on in. The man enters the room and without saying another word, disrobes and walks towards Thomas to have sexual relations with him.

== Cast ==
- Robert Dahdah as Mr. Jaffee
- Gerald Jacuzzo as Thomas
- Hal Sherwood as Miss Parish
- Hal Borske as Mavis
- Richard Holdberger as Thumbelina
- Larry Ree as Taffy
- Joel Thurm as Clerk
- Ron Keith as Intruder
- Mayron Williams as Attendant
- Matt Baylor as Man

== Production ==
William M. Hoffman, playwright and friend of Andy Milligan, has said that all of the interior shots of Vapors took place in a vacant apartment floor on 199 Prince Street in Manhattan in the same building where both William and Andy lived during that time. Joel Thurm, who played the bathhouse attendant, has said that the shots of the transaction with the clerk took place in a candy store a few streets away either on 6th or 8th avenues. The opening exterior shot of the bathhouse was the only shot filmed outside the actual St. Marks Bathhouse on 6 St. Marks Place in the East Village, a destination famous as a rendezvous for gay sex, which was illegal at the time. The film was shot on 16mm black-and-white film.

== Release ==
Vapors was Andy Milligan's first official film. It was first released as an underground gay film in selected art houses on December 3, 1965. Vapors was released to the general public in New York City in August 1967 at the Cameo Cinema as part of an adults only triple bill, two years after the film was produced. Both Something Weird Video (SWV) and the British Film Institute (BFI) have issued home video versions, but the film is in the public domain.

== See also ==
- List of American films of 1965
