= Bernice Loren =

American actress

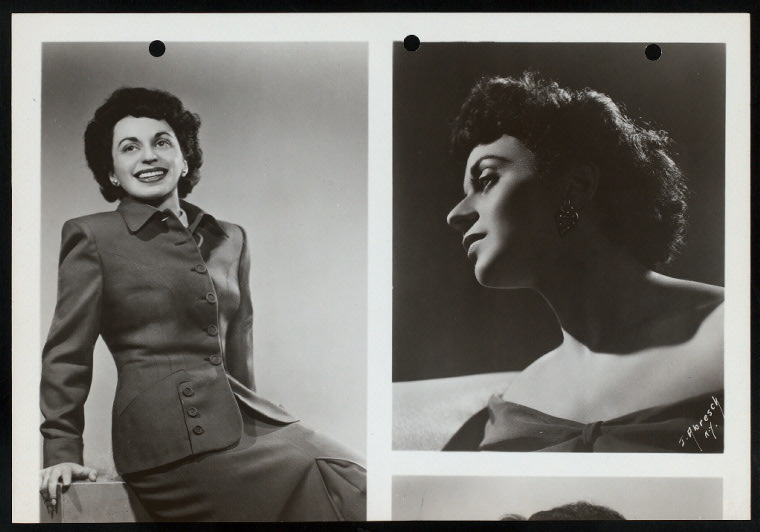
- Born: 1920
- Died: May 4, 2010 (aged 89–90); New York City, U.S.
- Occupations: Actress, Teacher

Bernice Loren (1920 – May 4, 2010) was a well known American actress, director, teacher and mentor to many actors, best known for an inspirational combined performance technique, "emanating from a place of unity,"

== Biography ==
Her initial theatre training was with Erwin Piscator and included studies with Lee Strasberg, Reiken Ben-Ari, Valerie Bettis, Marian Rich, and many others. Throughout her professional career she has continued to study, experiment, and do research for her work. From a throughout background in Stanislavski’s approach she went on to investigate various acting methods and styles, performing under and observing foreign specialists at work, among them Ono’é Baiko VII, George Devine, Yuri Zavadasky, Dimitros Rondiris, Jacques Charon. To modern dance instruction she added ballet, period manners and movement (William Burdick), Mensendieck, Yoga (Acharya and Hatha), and tai chi. Voice and speech training was extended to include dialect studies (Milenko Rado) and singing (Margaret McCulloch).

Miss Loren has played over forty roles Off-Broadway and in stock and resident theatres. She has directed over twenty-five plays Off-Broadway, in stock, and in community theatres. She has taught acting, voice and speech, and movement in resident theatre companies, City College, and community theatres. As co-founder-director-manager with Marilyn Lief of a summer stock theatre in East Jordan, Michigan she was involved in every aspect of theatre work, onstage and backstage, in addition to teaching apprentices. As the director of the Professional Workshop of stage 73 she helped to formulate its experimental program, selected Workshop personnel by auditioning a large body of actors and interviewing numerous directors, and also directed along-run children’s play. She is the author of a text on voice and speech, Effective Speaking, and has written plays, stories, articles, and poems.

== Students of Bernice Loren ==
- Pauline Hahn
- Dirk Weiler
- G. Beaudin
