= Herschel Bernardi =

American actor (1923–1986)

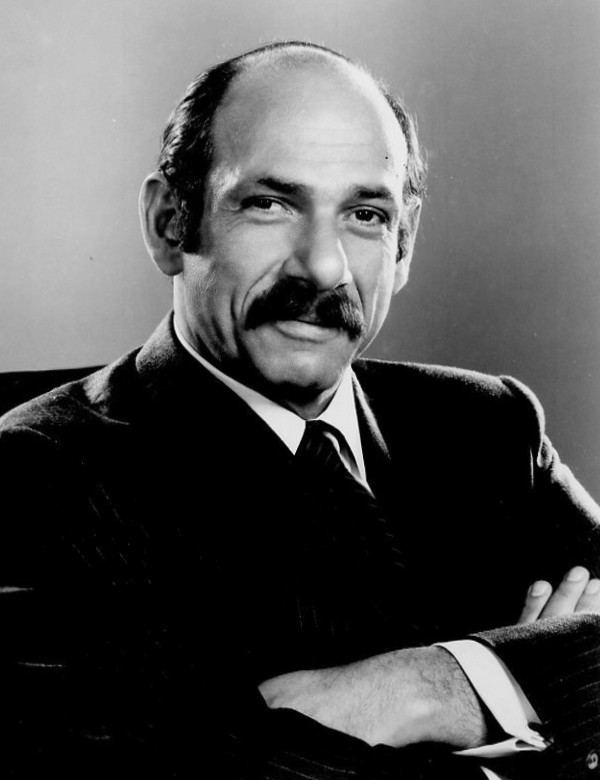
- Bernardi in 1970
- Born: October 30, 1923; New York City, New York, U.S.
- Died: May 9, 1986 (aged 62); Los Angeles, California, U.S.
- Occupations: Actor, singer
- Years active: 1937–1986
- Spouse: Teri Bernardi (19??–1986; his death)
- Children: 4

Herschel Bernardi (October 30, 1923 – May 9, 1986) was an American actor and singer. He is best known for his supporting role in the television detective series Peter Gunn (1958–1961) for which he was nominated for a Primetime Emmy Award and his starring role in the comedy television series Arnie (1970–1972) which earned him two consecutive Golden Globe Award nominations.

On stage, Bernardi appeared in many Broadway musicals. He was nominated for two Tony Awards for his performances in the original production of Zorba and the 1981 revival of Fiddler on the Roof.

== Biography ==
Bernardi is known for his starring roles on Broadway, including Tevye in Fiddler on the Roof, Zorba, and Bajour. He also appeared in many television programs, including Harbor Command and The Eleventh Hour (both with Wendell Corey) and State Trooper with Rod Cameron.

His career as a performer was affected by his being blacklisted for alleged involvement in the Communist Party in the 1950s.

From 1958 to 1961, Bernardi co-starred with Craig Stevens in Blake Edwards's television series Peter Gunn. He received his sole Emmy nomination, for Best Supporting Actor (Continuing Character) in a Dramatic Series - 1959, for his portrayal of somber police Lieutenant Jacoby.

In 1961, Bernardi guest-starred in a Bonanza episode ("The Smiler") as Clarence Bolling, the vengeful brother of a murdered man.

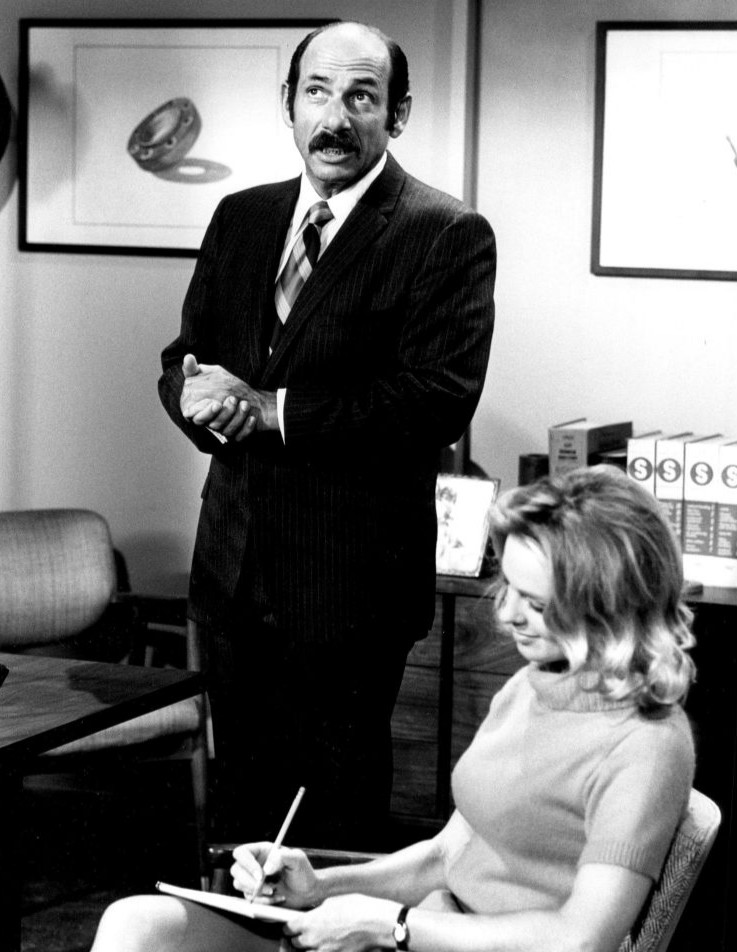
Bernardi and Angel Tompkins in Arnie, in 1970

In 1963, he was cast as Mr. Otis, a teacher who mostly ignores his students, in the episode "I Don't Even Live Here" of the NBC education drama series Mr. Novak starring James Franciscus.

Bernardi starred in the CBS sitcom Arnie (1970-1972). He starred for two years as someone plucked from the loading dock of a flange company to become an executive. He was nominated for Golden Globe Awards for Best Performance by an Actor in a Television Series - Musical or Comedy in 1971 and 1972.

He voiced Woodhead the rocking horse in Filmation's Journey Back to Oz. He also provided the Cowardly Lion's singing voice while Milton Berle provided the character's speaking voice. He also appeared as Joe Vitelli in the 1977 TV miniseries Seventh Avenue.

In Hail to the Chief (1985), a comedy on ABC, Bernardi played Helmut Luger.

Bernardi was in several notable films, including Murder by Contract (1958); A Cold Wind in August (1961); The George Raft Story (1961); Irma La Douce (1963); Love with the Proper Stranger (1963); No Deposit, No Return (1976); and The Front (1976), a film about blacklisting in the entertainment industry. Bernardi was the victim of blacklisting during the 1950s, as were several other performers and the screenwriter and director on that film. Bernardi also narrated and emceed The Golden Age of Second Avenue, a 1969 film documentary about the Yiddish theatre movement on New York's Lower East Side of the early-to-mid 20th century (where Bernardi had launched his acting career).

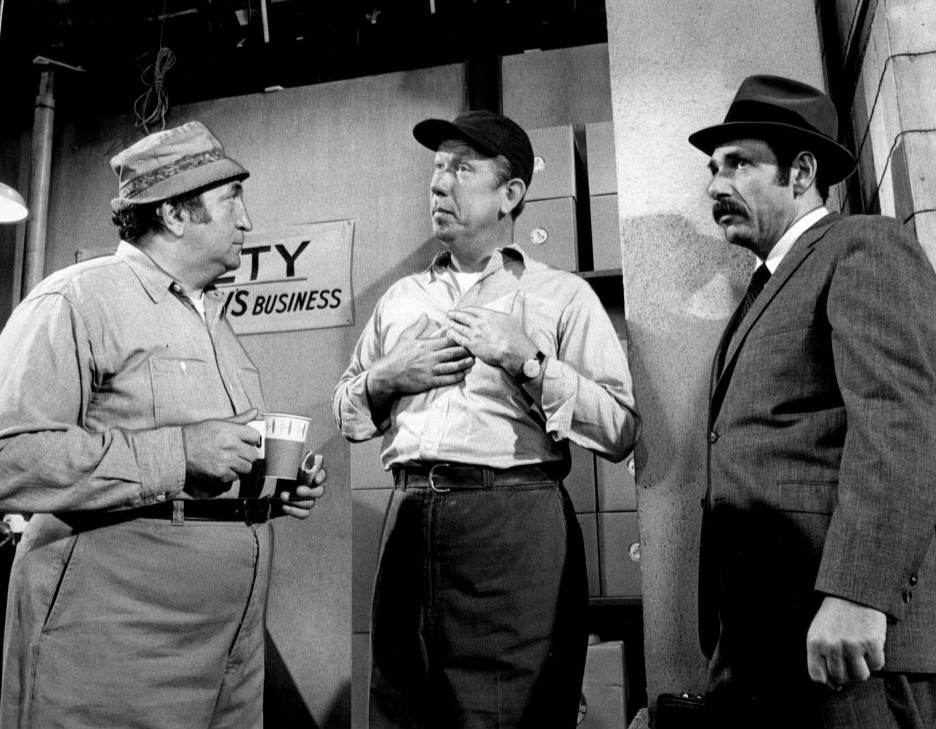
Tom Pedi, Allan Melvin and Bernardi as Arnie Nuvo in Arnie, in 1971

Bernardi was a noted voiceover artist and narrator, contributing to hundreds of films, commercials and cartoons, including as the original voice of StarKist Tuna animated character "Charlie the Tuna" and original voice of the Jolly Green Giant. He was also the narrator of a long-running Tootsie Pop commercial, saying, "How many licks does it take to get to the Tootsie Roll center of a Tootsie Pop? The world may never know."

Herschel Bernardi also had two minor record hits, 1967's "If I Were a Rich Man", reflecting his success as Tevye, and 1971's "Pencil Marks on the Wall".

In 1961, the Vanguard Recording Society issued "Chocolate Covered Matzohs", recorded 'live' in front of an audience at the Valley Cities Jewish Community Center of Los Angeles, California, which was a collection of sentimental and wryly humorous tales in Yiddish and English of Jewish immigration into the U.S. at the turn of the 20th century and also featured some songs.

His album, Fiddler On the Roof peaked at No. 138 on the Billboard Top LPs, during a five-week run on the chart.

== Death ==
Bernardi died in his sleep of a heart attack in Los Angeles on May 9, 1986, at age 62. The New York Times chose his role in the first run of Fiddler on the Roof as his iconic performance:

"Husky and bearded, Mr. Bernardi was a versatile actor with many roles to his credit. But it was as Tevye, the poor milkman in the hamlet of Anatevka, that audiences remembered him most fondly."

"The character had been created on Broadway by Zero Mostel, who was followed on the boards by Luther Adler. As Tevye No. 3, Mr. Bernardi played the role 702 times on Broadway over three years, starting in November 1965."

== Filmography ==
=== Film ===
Year	Title	Role	Notes
1937	Green Fields	Avram-Yankov	Credited as Hershel Bernardi
1938	The Singing Blacksmith	Young Yankel	Credited as Hershel Bernardi
1947	Danger Street	Casino Doorman	Uncredited
1958	Stakeout on Dope Street	Mr. Fennel	
1958	Murder by Contract	George	
1959	The Savage Eye	Kirk	
1959	1001 Arabian Nights	The Jinni of the Lamp (voice)	
1961	A Cold Wind in August	Juley Franz	
1961	The George Raft Story	Sam	
1963	Irma la Douce	Inspector Lefevre	
1963	Love with the Proper Stranger	Dominick Rossini	
1963	The Great Rights	(voice)	Short Film
1964	Send Me No Flowers	TV Announcer (voice)	Uncredited
1964	The Hangman	Narrator	Short Film
1965	The Man from Button Willow	The Captain / Saloon Man #1 (voice)	
1965	Sean O'Casey: The Spirit of Ireland	Narrator (voice)	Short Film
1967	The Honey Pot	Oscar Ludwig	Scenes deleted
1967	Union Carbide: Super Insulation		Short Film
1970	The Ghost Monster	(voice)	Short Film
1970	The Drifter	(voice)	Short Film
1970	The Proton Pulsator	Strong Man / Diaper Man / Tornado Man (voice)	Short Film
1970	The Shocker	(voice)	Short Film
1971	The Big Freeze	Strong Man / Diaper Man / Tornado Man (voice)	Short Film
1972	Journey Back to Oz	Woodenhead Pinto Stallion III (voice)	
1972	The Paper Monster	Strong Man / Diaper Man / Tornado Man (voice)	Short Film
1976	No Deposit, No Return	Sgt. Turner	
1976	The Front	Phil Sussman	

=== Television ===
Year	Title	Role	Notes
1956–1958	NBC Matinee Theatre	Borachio / M. Plevian	4 episodes
1957	Studio 57		Episode: "A Little Care"
1958	The Walter Winchell File		Episode: "Terror"
1958	Suspicion	Father Salvadore	Episode: "Comfort for the Grave"
1958	Harbor Command	Turk Savage	Episode: "Four to Die"
1958	Mike Hammer	Joe Sale	Episode: "A Shot in the Arm"
1958	The Court of Last Resort	Frank Kerlo	Episode: "The Allen Cutler Case"
1958	State Trooper	Jake Carney	Episode: "312 Vertical"
1958	Zorro	Manuel Hernandez	Episode: "The Sergeant Regrets"
1958	Schlitz Playhouse of Stars	Eddie	Episode: "You'll Have to Die Now"
1958	M Squad	Vic Gordon	Episode: "The Executioner"
1958–1961	Peter Gunn	Lieutenant Jacoby	102 episodes
1961	Bonanza	Clarence Bolling	Episode: "The Smiler"
1961	Cain's Hundred	Louis Strode	Episode: "The Penitent: Louis Strode"
1961	Top Cat	Muggsy (voice)	Episode: "The Unscratchables"
1961–1962	Dr. Kildare	Nathan Agurski / Pico	2 episodes
1962	Checkmate	Ned Hazly	Episode: "The Renaissance of Gussie Hill"
1962	The Detectives	Arizon	Episode: "The Con Man"
1962	The Flintstones	Agent / Detective / Doctor #1 / Silky (voice)	4 episodes
1962	Sam Benedict	Insp. Tony Delgano	Episode: "Twenty Aching Years"
1962	Naked City	Gus Slate / Stanley Dorkner	2 episodes
1962	The Untouchables	Benno Fisk / Julius Albert Vernon	2 episodes
1962–1963	The Dick Powell Theatre	Christopher Burton / Major Abrams	2 episodes
1962–1964	Route 66	Gerald Ward / Dr. Arthur Reisman	2 episodes
1962–1964	Insight	Host	2 episodes
1963	Car 54, Where Are You?	Governor's Aide	Episode: "The Biggest Day of the Year"; uncredited
1963	Mr. Novak	Mr. Otis	Episode: "I Don't Even Live Here"
1963	The Eleventh Hour	Bernie Miller / Harry Cizon	2 episodes
1964	Grindl	Joe Bostick	Episode: "The Lucky Piece"
1964	Burke's Law	Kid McCoy	Episode: "Who Killed Marty Kelso?"
1964	Kraft Suspense Theatre	Joe Monti	Episode: "Their Own Executioners"
1964	The Defenders	George Conn / Myron Bellmore	2 episodes
1964	Bob Hope Presents the Chrysler Theatre	McCarthy	Episode: "The Sojourner"
1964	Vacation Playhouse	Jerome P. Baggley	Episode: "Hooray for Hollywood"
1965	Profiles in Courage	Gen. Daniel Sickles	Episode: "Edmund G. Ross"
1965	The Doctors and the Nurses	Carl Garson	Episode: "The Witnesses"
1965	The Trials of O'Brien	Grommet	Episode: "Bargain Day on the Street of Regret"
1965	The Fugitive	Captain Ames	2 episodes
1965	Seaway	Captain Petroff	Episode: "Abraham's Hand"
1966	The Mighty Heroes	Strong Man / Diaper Man / Tornado Man (voice)	2 episodes
1968	The Red Skelton Hour	Muggsy	Episode: "Love Is an Itch You Can't Scratch"
1968	A Hatful of Rain	John Pope, Sr.	TV movie
1970	But I Don't Want to Get Married!	Walter Benjamin	ABC Movie of the Week
1970–1972	Arnie	Arnie Nuvo	Main cast; 48 episodes
1971	Rowan & Martin's Laugh-In	Guest Performer	2 episodes; uncredited
1972	No Place to Run	Hyam Malsh	ABC Movie of the Week
1972	Sandcastles	Alexis	TV movie
1974	Judgement: The Trial of Julius and Ethel Rosenburg		TV movie
1974	The Story of Jacob and Joseph	Laban	TV movie
1975	Lucas Tanner	Bert Nevins	Episode: "Those Who Cannot, Teach"
1976	Good Heavens	Morris Kropotkin	Episode: "The Queen's Rook Club"
1976	Newman's Drugstore	Charles Newman	TV movie
1977	Seventh Avenue	Joe Vitelli	3 episodes
1978	Actor	Nahum Favel Weissenfreund	TV movie
1979	$weepstake$		Episode: "Episode #1.5"
1981	The Million Dollar Face	Nick Ravenna	TV movie
1985	Murder, She Wrote	Det. Lt. Avery Mendelsohn	Episode: "Capitol Offense"
1985	Hail to the Chief	Helmut Luger	Episode: "Pilot"
1985	The Greatest Adventure: Stories from the Bible	Goliath (voice)	Episode: "David and Goliath"
1986	Highway to Heaven	Everett Soloman	Episode: "The Torch"
1986	The Magical World of Disney	Bogosian	Episode: "I-Man"
1986	Taking It Home	Papa Joe Morelli	TV movie

=== Commercials ===
Year	Title	Role	Notes
1969	Tootsie Pop: How Many Licks	Announcer (voice)	
