= The Rats Are Coming! The Werewolves Are Here! =

- Directed by: Andy Milligan
- Written by: Andy Milligan
- Produced by: William Mishkin
- Starring: Hope Stansbury; Jackie Skarvellis; Noel Collins; Joan Ogden; Douglas Phair; Ian Innes
- Cinematography: Gerald Jackson
- Edited by: Raffine
- Production company: Constitution Films
- Distributed by: William Mishkin Motion Pictures
- Release date: May 1972
- Running time: 92 minutes
- Country: United States
- Language: English

The Rats Are Coming! The Werewolves Are Here! is a 1972 American horror film written, shot, edited and directed by Andy Milligan.

== Plot ==
In 1899, lives the eccentric Mooney family who reside in a large house in rural England. The invalid patriarch 'Pa' Mooney is a retired medical doctor who claims to be 180 years old. His eldest daughter, Phoebe, more or less cares for him and is head of the household. His eldest son, Mortimer, is a businessman who conducts the finances and contributes to the income. Younger daughter Monica is a sadist who keeps live rats as pets and frequently mutilates them and other small animals. Youngest son Malcolm is a halfwit with animalistic tendencies; the family keeps him locked in a room with live chickens. The family has a secret: they are all natural born werewolves who transform once a month on the night of the full moon. Pa Mooney has been researching for years to find a way to break the family curse.

Youngest daughter Diana returns home from medical school in Scotland with a new husband, a former classmate named Gerald, of whom Pa heartily disapproves. Pa tells Diana that she is the last hope the family has to overcome the ancient curse, since she is the only member of the family who does not turn into a werewolf on the night of the full moon. Will Diana succeed? Diana is eventually revealed to have other plans, and on top of that, she has her own secret as to why she is "different" from the other werewolves of the Mooney family.

== Cast ==
- Hope Stansbury as Monica Mooney
- Jackie Skarvellis as Diana
- Noel Collins as Mortimer Mooney
- Joan Ogden as Phoebe Mooney
- Douglas Phair as Pa Mooney
- Ian Innes as Gerald
- Berwick Kaler as Malcolm Mooney
- Chris Shore
- Andy Milligan as gunsmith (credited as George Clark)
- Lillian Frit

== Release ==
The film was released theatrically in the United States by William Mishkin Motion Pictures in 1972. It was filmed entirely in England in 1969 back-to-back with other Milligan directed films, including The Body Beneath, Bloodthirsty Butchers, and The Man with Two Heads. Some scenes were filmed nearly two years later in Staten Island at the request of producer Mishkin to pad out the short running time.

Because of the low budget, Milligan actually acted in at least two different roles during the production under two different names which included playing a gunsmith who sells Diana a pistol containing silver bullets, as well as a pawnshop owner named Mr. Micawber in the re-shot scenes involving Monica and the rats (which were added after Willard achieved popularity).

The film was released on VHS by Midnight Video in the 1980s.

== See also ==
- List of American films of 1972
