= Bloodthirsty Butchers (film) =

1970 horror film by Andy Milligan

- Theatrical release poster
- Directed by: Andy Milligan
- Written by: Andy Milligan; John Borske
- Produced by: William Mishkin
- Starring: Michael Cox; Linda Driver; Jane Helay; Bernard Kaler
- Cinematography: Andy Milligan
- Edited by: Andy Milligan
- Production companies: Constitution Films, Inc.
- Distributed by: William Mishkin Motion Pictures, Inc.
- Release date: January 23, 1970
- Running time: 79 minutes
- Country: United States
- Language: English
- Budget: $18,000 (estimated)

Bloodthirsty Butchers is a 1970 horror film directed by Andy Milligan and starring Michael Cox, Linda Driver, Jane Helay, and Bernard Kaler. It is an adaptation of the notorious story of Sweeney Todd. The film was released as a double feature with Torture Dungeon.

== Plot ==
An updated version of the Sweeney Todd legend, this melodrama tells the tale of a murderous barber, Sweeney Todd, who supplies raw meat for his neighbor, Mrs. Lovett, who runs a pie shop. Amid the resulting carnage is a romantic sub-plot, although the film focuses mainly on the gore.

== Cast ==
- Annabella Wood as Johanna Jeffrey
- Berwick Kaler as Tobias Ragg
- Jane Helay as Mrs. Lovett
- John Miranda as Sweeney Todd

== Release ==
Bloodthirsty Butchers premiered on 23 January 1970 and was re-released in a special screening of the Milligan Mania as part of the Cinedelphia Film Festival on 10 April 2015 over Exhumed Films.

=== Home media ===
Bloodthirsty Butchers was first released on VHS in the mid 1980s by the defunct video company Midnight Video. The film was released for the first time on DVD by Films Around The World Inc. on January 1, 2013. The company would re-released the film on August 28, 2018.

== Reception ==
TV Guide rated the film one out of four stars, calling it a "gory and typically cheap retelling of the Sweeney Todd legend".
