= Elaine Shore =

American actress (1929–2007)

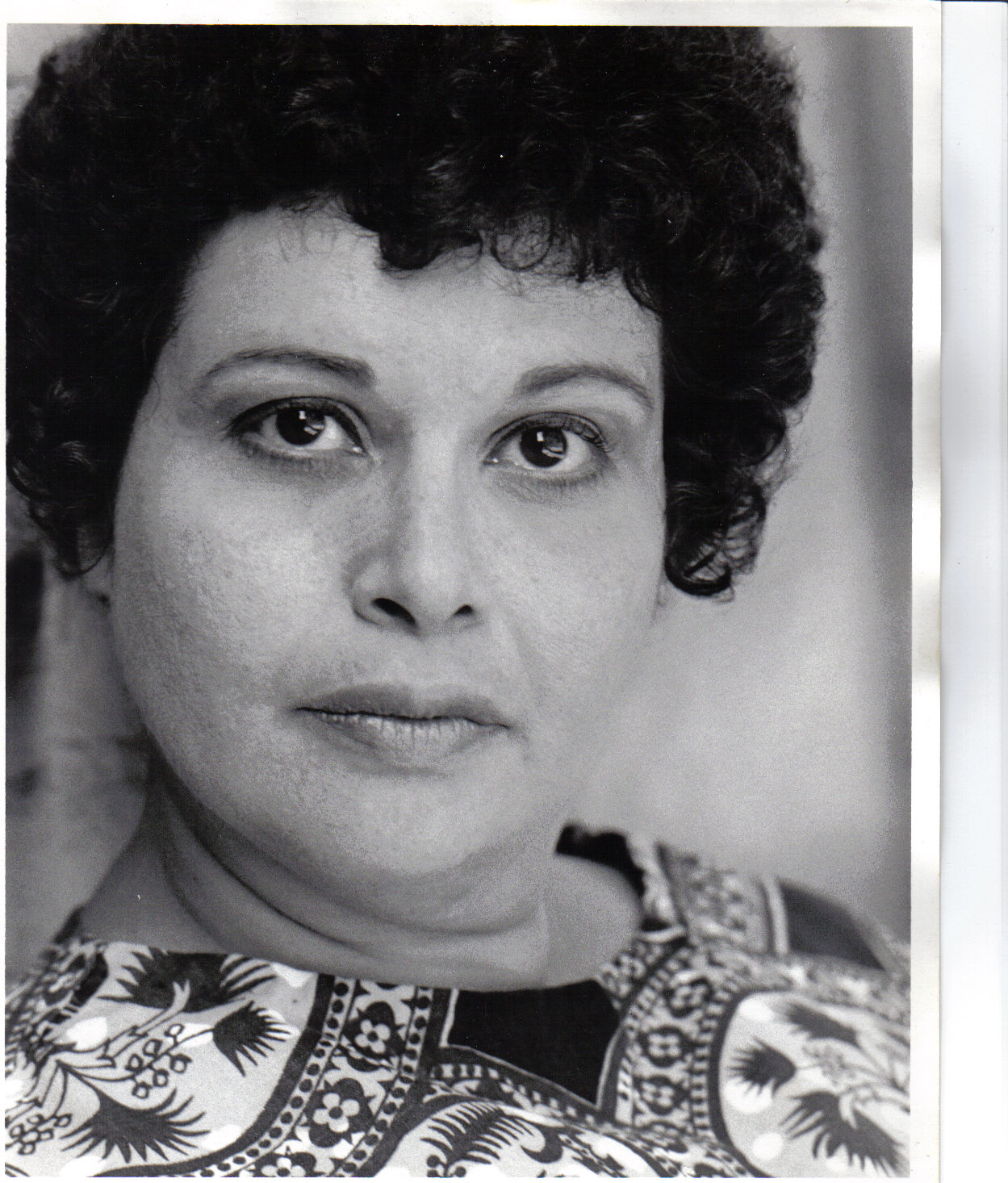
- Born: Elaine Borovay; March 4, 1929; Chicago, Illinois, U.S.
- Died: March 19, 2007 (aged 78); Rockville, Maryland, U.S.
- Occupation: Actress
- Years active: 1966–1989
- Spouse: Alexander Shore
- Children: 1

Elaine Shore (March 4, 1929 – March 19, 2007) was an American actress. Born in Chicago in 1929, she studied at the Goodman Theatre.

== Family ==
Moving to Washington, D.C. in 1950, she and her former husband, Alexander Shore, had a daughter, Wendy.

== Biography ==
Shore became active in community theatre both as an actor and director and created a theatre company in 1964 called "Actor's Company". She became a guest artist at Howard University during their 1965–66 season, starring in James Baldwin's Blues for Mister Charlie and in Weill and Brecht's The Threepenny Opera as Mrs. Peachum.

She moved to New York City in 1966 and began her professional acting career by appearing in Al Carmines' San Francisco's Burning and Ted Shine's Sandcastles and Dreams. She then auditioned for Terrence McNally for his one-act play Next and was cast with James Coco in this off-Broadway hit. After Otto Preminger viewed the play, he cast Coco and Shore to appear in Tell Me That You Love Me, Junie Moon.

Shore was cast as the no-nonsense secretary, Felicia Farfus, on the CBS television sitcom, Arnie, which ran from 1970 to 1972. Other performances on television included Love, American Style. She appeared in such films as The Eiger Sanction (1975) and The Sentinel (1977).

In 1974, she won the Joseph Jefferson Award for Best Actress for her performance in The Sea Horse at the Ivanhoe Theatre in Chicago.

== Death ==
She moved back to Washington, D.C. in 1989 to be close to her daughter and her family. She died of cancer on March 19, 2007, aged 78, at the Hebrew Home of Greater Washington in Rockville, Maryland.

== Filmography ==
Year	Title	Role	Notes
1970	Tell Me That You Love Me, Junie Moon	Mrs. Wyner	
1970	Nightbirds	Mabel	
1975	The Eiger Sanction	Miss Cerberus	
1977	The Sentinel	Emma Clotkin	
