= Gandersheimer Domfestspiele =

Coordinates: 51°52′12″N 10°01′34″E

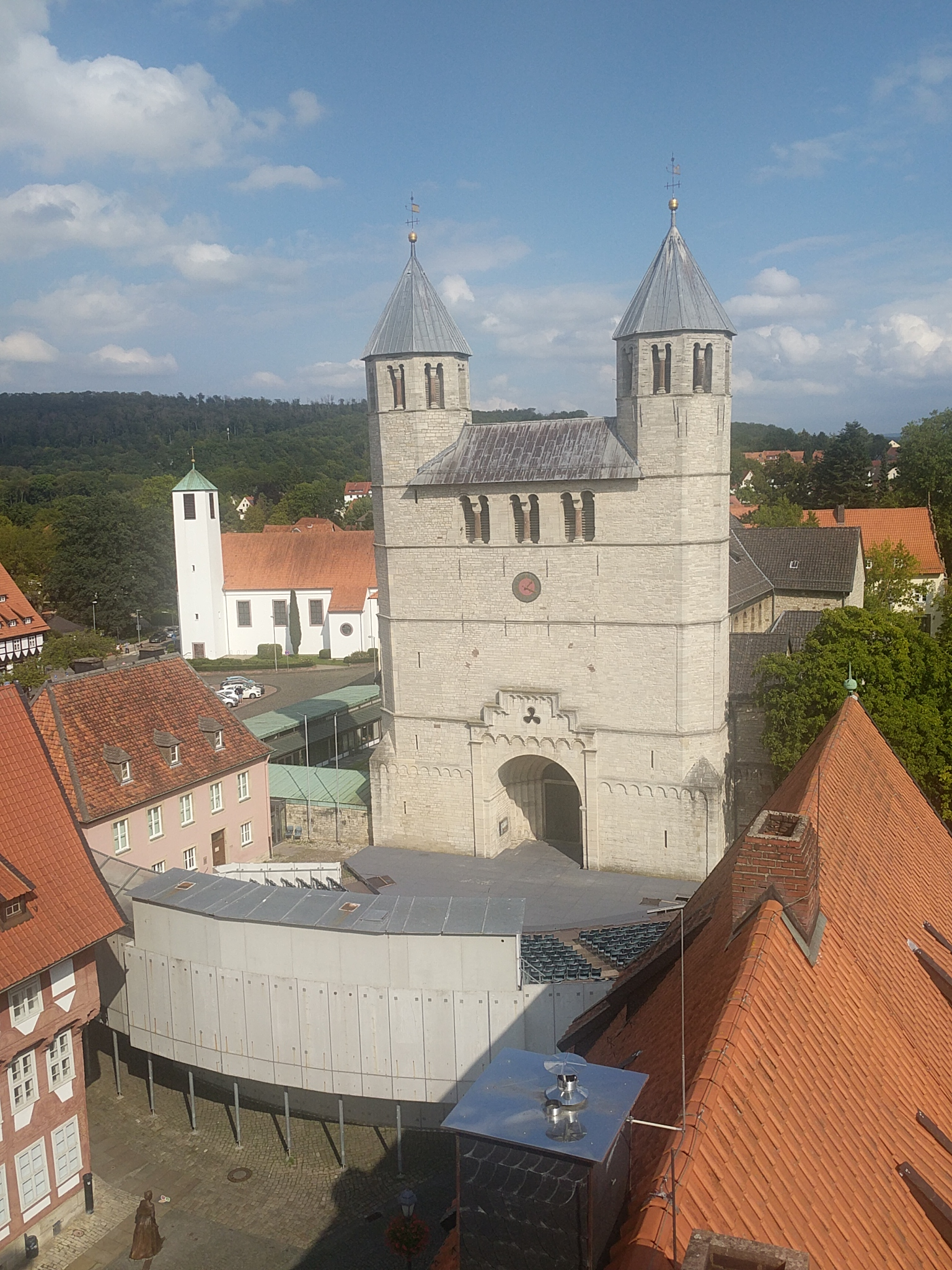
- Performances take place in front of Bad Gandersheim's collegiate church
- Location: Bad Gandersheim, Lower Saxony, Germany
- Founded: 1959
- Artistic director: Achim Lenz (since 2017)
- Website: www.domfestspiele.de

Gandersheimer Domfestspiele is a theatre festival in Germany. Festival takes place every year from mid-June to mid-August in the spa town of Bad Gandersheim in southern Lower Saxony. The largest open-air theater in Lower Saxony is one of the most traditional festivals in Germany. Over 55,000 spectators attend the festival every year.

== History of the Gandersheim Festival ==
The Domfestspiele (Cathedral Festival) traces its origins to the 1100th-anniversary celebrations of Gandersheim Abbey. In 1952, as part of a grand festival week, the historical open-air play Das Lied von Gandersheim, written by Herta Sellschopp and directed by Eberhard Gieseler, premiered on the town’s market square.

The festival in its current form began in the summer of 1959, staged in front of the Romanesque collegiate church under the auspices of the Kulturwerk Bundesweihestätte Greene in collaboration with the city of Bad Gandersheim. Gieseler, serving as the first artistic director, opened with Hugo von Hofmannsthal’s Jedermann. In 1961, the city of Bad Gandersheim assumed official responsibility for the festival, with Gieseler at the helm until 1964.

=== Evolving Repertoire ===
The first decade focused on German classics, while the second introduced comedies. A major milestone came in 1978–79 with The Man of La Mancha, the first musical performed before the cathedral. During the same period, Pafnutius – The Conversion of the Courtesan Thais, written over a thousand years earlier by the Gandersheim canoness Hrotsvit, was revived. In 1982, The Robber Hotzenplotz became the festival’s first production for young audiences.

=== Modern Expansion ===
From 1991 to 2003, Georg Immelmann served as artistic director, introducing initiatives like the Musical Academy Bad Gandersheim (2000) for performer training and winter festival editions (1998–2002) at the Brunshausen Cultural Center. His successor, Johannes Klaus (2004–2011), broadened the repertoire to include opera The Magic Flute and operetta Die Fledermaus. A record-breaking 2006 season featured four in-house productions—The Jungle Book, The Visit, The Rocky Horror Show, and Die Fledermaus—drawing 55,000 attendees at 90% capacity.

==== Recent Developments ====
In 2005, the Friends of the Gandersheim Festival was founded to support the event. Financial challenges led to the festival’s reorganization as a nonprofit GmbH in 2011. Christian Doll (2012–2016) and Achim Lenz (2017–present) later steered the festival through evolving artistic landscapes. The unprecedented cancellation of the 2020 season due to COVID-19 threatened its survival, but donor and sponsor generosity ensured its continuation.
