= James G. Hirsch =

American physician and biomedical researcher

James Gerald Hirsch
- Born: October 31, 1922; St. Louis, Missouri, US
- Died: May 25, 1987 (aged 64); Memorial Sloan-Kettering Cancer Center, New York, US
- Spouse: Beate Kaleschke (second wife)
- Children: 3

James Gerald Hirsch (October 31, 1922 – May 25, 1987) was an American physician and biomedical researcher who specialized in immunology. Hirsch was also notable for his studies of phagocyte.

== Biography ==
Hirsh was born in St. Louis, Missouri on October 31, 1922.

He received his undergraduate degree from Yale University in 1942. Hirsh graduated from Columbia University's College of Physicians and Surgeons in 1946 with an M.D. degree. He became a member of the Rockefeller Institute's faculty in 1950, becoming a full professor in 1960.

In 1957 his research showed that a prolonged rest is not needed for treatment of the tuberculosis, and resulted in international changes to how tuberculosis patients are treated by allowing local hospitals rather than sanatoriums to take care of the sick.

Hirsch died of cancer at the Memorial Sloan-Kettering Cancer Center on May 25, 1987.

== Titles ==
Hirsch was a member of the National Academy of Sciences, president of the Josiah Macy Jr. Foundation, dean of graduate studies at the Rockefeller University, chairman of the Medical Sciences section of the National Academy of Sciences and chairman of the Assembly of Life Sciences of the National Research Council. He was also an editor of the Journal of Experimental Medicine.

== Legacy ==
The New York Times called Hirsch "a leader in blood research". The National Academies Press called him "a pivotal figure in leukocyte biology".
