= Andy Milligan =

American actor and filmmaker (1929–1991)

- Born: Andrew Jackson Milligan, Jr. February 12, 1929; Saint Paul, Minnesota, U.S.
- Died: June 3, 1991 (aged 62); Los Angeles, California, U.S.
- Other names: Richard Fox; Joi Gogan; Gerald Jackson; A. Milligan; Andrew Milligan; George Clark; Charles Richards
- Occupations: Film director; theatre director; screenwriter; actor; cinematographer; film editor; film producer; playwright
- Years active: 1951–1990
- Spouse: Candy Hammond (1968–69) (divorced)

Andrew Jackson Milligan Jr. (February 12, 1929 – June 3, 1991) was an American filmmaker, stage director, actor, and playwright. Following a brief acting career, Milligan worked as a stage director in the off-off-Broadway milieu. He then turned to filmmaking, starting with an arthouse short but quickly moving to exploitation films. His works, all of them low-budget, include a number of horror films and are known for their violence, misanthropy and misogyny.

== Early life ==
Milligan was born on February 12, 1929, in St. Paul, Minnesota. His father, Andrew Milligan Sr. (February 17, 1894 – October 25, 1985) was a career U.S. Army officer. The family frequently moved around the country as a result of this. Milligan's mother, Marie Gladys Hull (June 10, 1900, – November 12, 1953), was an overweight alcoholic with severe physical and mental health problems who served as an inspiration for some of Milligan's movie characters. He was close to his father, who affectionately called him 'Junior', but had a troubled relationship with his mother who, according to family members, was both physically and mentally abusive towards all her children as well as her husband.

He had an older half-brother named Harley LeRoy Hull (July 10, 1924 – February 17, 1998) and a younger sister named Louise Milligan Howe (May 27, 1931 – January 2, 2021).

After finishing high school in 1947, Milligan enlisted in the U.S. Navy, serving for four years. After his honorable discharge in 1951, he moved to New York City, where he acted on stage, and opened a dress shop. He was a self-taught filmmaker and was responsible for much of the creative activity on his movies (including cinematography and costume design).

== Career ==
During the late 1950s, Milligan became involved in the nascent off-off-Broadway theater movement where he mounted productions of plays by Lord Dunsany and Jean Genet at the Caffe Cino, a small Greenwich Village coffeehouse that served as a hothouse for rising theater talent like Lanford Wilson, Tom Eyen and John Guare. Milligan also became involved with directing low-key theater productions at Café La Mama in 1962 (renamed the La MaMa Experimental Theatre Club in 1964). During this period, he operated and designed for a clothing boutique named Ad Lib and used his dressmaking skills to costume many theatrical productions.

In the early 1960s, Milligan began making movies. He met some of the actors for his early movies at Caffe Cino. His first released movie was a 30-minute black-and-white 16 mm short drama titled Vapors (1965). The movie, set on one Friday evening in the St. Mark's Baths, a gay bathhouse for men, portrays an emotionally awkward and unconsummated meeting between two strangers. Milligan was later employed by producers of exploitation films, particularly William Mishkin, to direct softcore sexploitation and horror features, many featuring actors known from the off-off Broadway theater community.

Most of his early exploitation movie fell into the genre of morality play. Milligan's plays and movies explored topics of transgression and punishment, dysfunctional family relationships, repressed sexuality, homosexuality and physical deformity, and include such titles as Depraved! (1967), The Naked Witch (1967), The Promiscuous Sex (1967), The Degenerates (1967), The Filthy Five (1969), Gutter Trash (1969), The Ghastly Ones (1968), Seeds of Sin (1968), Fleshpot on 42nd Street (1973), The Rats Are Coming! The Werewolves Are Here! (1973), and Guru, the Mad Monk (1970). Most of Milligan's early works are currently considered lost films.

In 1966, Milligan set up his residence in a Victorian-era mansion located in St. George, Staten Island, within a mile walking distance of the Staten Island Ferry. The house soon became what he dubbed "Hollywood Central," where he filmed several of his movies. Milligan wrote, directed, built sets and sewed costumes for nearly all of his movies. His usual "stock company" often was supplemented by Staten Island locals.

Milligan's early movies were shot with a single hand-held 16-millimeter Auricon sound-on-film news camera. This technique was inspired by Andy Warhol and allowed Milligan to move the camera around at will, at times punctuating violent scenes with his "swirl camera" technique through which he would spin the camera and point it to the ground. Often working with budgets under $10,000, his movies feature very tight framing that helped cover his very low budgets, particularly in the case of the period pieces that were most of his horror movies. His ability to make movies with such low budgets is why Mishkin often hired him and Mishkin's influence on the 42nd Street grindhouse circuit meant that Milligan's pictures played there often. Milligan filmed all of his movies on short ends; using old and unused leftover film reels of 16 mm and later 35mm film that he acquired through various means from other film sets as a means to keep production costs down.

In 1968, Milligan began to make horror movies featuring gore effects with The Ghastly Ones, a 19th-century period piece and his first color movie, produced by JER and titled by Sam Sherman. In 1969, he made his next horror movie, a medieval period piece titled Torture Dungeon, after which he moved to London, England to make movies there after having made a deal with producer Leslie Elliot. After directing the exploitation drama Nightbirds in London, his partnership with Elliot collapsed as he was working on The Body Beneath. Milligan then teamed with William Mishkin again where Mishkin produced and Milligan directed three more 19th-century period piece British horror pictures: Bloodthirsty Butchers, The Man With Two Heads, and The Rats Are Coming. The Werewolves Are Here (all shot in 1969). Milligan returned to Staten Island in 1970.

On his return to New York, Milligan wrote and directed another medieval period piece titled Guru the Mad Monk, which was shot for the first time with a 35mm Arriflex camera and filmed entirely inside the St. Peter's Episcopal Church in Chelsea, Manhattan. This movie was released in December 1970 on a double feature with The Body Beneath. Through the next years, Mishkin released Milligan's British-made pictures, some with additional scenes shot in New York. The Rats Are Coming! The Werewolves Are Here! was one of Mishkin's movies in which he had Milligan insert new killer rat scenes shot in New York, mostly at his new Staten Island house on Corson Street where Milligan lived during that time and filmed another horror period piece there in 1973, titled Blood.

After directing the 1972 sexploitation drama Fleshpot on 42nd Street, Milligan's output was restricted mostly to gory horror movies as he moved to the southern tip of Staten Island in the Tottenville neighborhood where he lived in and owned and operated a dilapidated hotel located at the corner end of Main Street and Ellis Street right next to the southern end of Staten Island Railway (currently an Italian-themed restaurant named Vincent Angelina's Ristorante). On October 27, 1977, Milligan moved into 335 West 39th Street in Manhattan (a four-story building purchased for $50,000 by Milligan and stockholders), where he founded and ran the Troupe Theatre, an off-off Broadway venue above which he lived in a third-floor loft until he left New York City for good in March 1985. He moved to Los Angeles, where he briefly owned a dress shop on Highland Boulevard from late 1985 to early 1986. Milligan then directed three more independently produced horror movies in 1987 and 1988, which included Monstrosity, The Weirdo, and Surgikill as well as operated another theater and production company, called Troupe West, which ran until early 1990.

In his non-fiction book about the horror genre titled Danse Macabre, Stephen King gives a short assessment of one of Milligan's movies: "The Ghastly Ones is the work of morons with cameras." Milligan developed a reputation as a maker of awful horror movies, featuring Herschell Gordon Lewis-type gore effects, both of which combined to give him a reputation as one of the worst directors of all time. The re-discovery of Fleshpot on 42nd Street—generally regarded to be his best work—in the 1990s by the Seattle-based video company Something Weird Video and the release of his biography in 2001 has made more widely known his theatrical background and the context to his work. Despite his modern-day recognition, most of Milligan's exploitation movies during the 1960s remain unseen because the prints were lost.

== Personal life ==
=== Personality ===
Milligan had a reputation throughout his life of being demanding and bad-tempered, often provoking fights and arguments with actors, movie producers and financiers. It has been alleged that he was physically, emotionally, and sexually abusive to male and female actors on movie sets. Some have speculated that he had exactly the same mental health problems as his mother did (whom he always talked about in a negative light); either bipolar disorder or some type of schizophrenia or possibly Schizoaffective disorder which remained undiagnosed and untreated throughout his life. A non-smoker and non-drinker, Milligan was said to react badly and violently if those around him smoked cigarettes, drank alcoholic beverages or used any type of recreational drug. Milligan also never had a driver's license, relying on public transportation wherever he lived.

=== Sexual orientation ===
Milligan was openly gay, enjoyed S&M and had very few long-term relationships (all of which were with men). In 1968, Milligan married Candy Hammond, a North Carolina stage actress and former "erotic dancer" who starred in several of his movies. The wedding service took place on February 24, 1968, at his Staten Island house located on 7 Phelps Place, which was still decorated for the movie shoot Seeds and attended by most of the crew people working on the movie as well as his father and Japanese stepmother (whom his father married in 1960 while Milligan Sr. was stationed in Japan). The wedding was not viewed seriously by any of the attendees because of Milligan's open homosexuality. According to Milligan's biographer Jimmy McDonough, Milligan decided to get married because he believed this could benefit his professional reputation. Candy divorced him the following year, apparently due to neglect as he was more focused on his film making career, and she shortly thereafter returned to her North Carolina hometown.

Milligan's boyfriend in his later years was B. "Bobby" Wayne Keeton (nicknamed by acquaintances the "human toothpick" for his gaunt physical build) (1960–1989), a Louisiana-born hustler who worked as a slate man and even appeared in a small part in Monstrosity, one of Milligan's later movies, which he filmed in Los Angeles in late 1987. Keeton died from AIDS on June 20, 1989. It is probable that Milligan was infected with HIV by Keeton.

=== Friendships ===
One of Milligan's close friends was a Vietnam veteran and ex-convict named Dennis Malvasi (1950- ), who acted in Milligan's Troupe Theater in the late 1970s-early 1980s and also worked for Milligan as a crew person, transportation driver and even acted in one of Milligan's horror movies, Carnage in 1983. Malvasi was a former U.S. Marine and demolitions expert who was suspected in numerous abortion clinic bombings in New York state during the 1980s. After the Troupe Theater closed in 1985, Malvasi was the person who drove Milligan on a cross-country, four-day road trip during Milligan's move to Los Angeles. Later in 1987, Malvasi was arrested, convicted and served five years in a federal prison for the attempted bombing of another abortion clinic in New York City.

Another one of Milligan's few close friends was character actor John Miranda (1926–2015), who starred as Sweeney Todd in Milligan's 1970 movie Bloodthirsty Butchers. Miranda later financially supported Milligan after his move to Los Angeles and assisted with medical expenses during Milligan's final years.

== Illness and death ==
In poor health from 1989, Milligan was diagnosed with AIDS some months after his lover Keeton died. He initially kept his condition a secret as he tried to continue working on writing stage play scripts and screenplays. Later, unable to find any more financial backers, he eventually closed down his theater and production company, Troupe West, in early 1990 and then completely withdrew from the public light altogether. In June 1990, Milligan confided in only two people the true state of his health; friend and actor John Miranda and writer-biographer Jimmy McDonough, who then became his part-time caregivers for the next 12 months.

Andy Milligan died in the early morning hours of June 3, 1991, from complications to AIDS at the Queen of Angels Hospital in Los Angeles, California, at age 62. He was buried in an unmarked grave somewhere in Los Angeles due to his poor financial situation on death.

== Filmography ==
=== Actor ===
- Armstrong Circle Theatre (three episodes, 1951–52)
- Kraft Television Theatre (one episode, 1953)
- The Rats Are Coming! The Werewolves Are Here! (1972, credited as 'George Clark')
- Legacy of Blood (1978, credited as 'Charles Richards')

=== Director and writer ===
- Vapors (1965, written by Hope Stansbury)
- The Naked Witch (also known as The Naked Temptress, 1967, lost)
- The Gay Life (1967, lost, documentary short film, co-directed by Clifford Solway; credited as Gerald Jackson)
- Compass Rose (1967, released unfinished on the byNWR site)
- The Degenerates (also known as Sex for Kicks, 1967)
- The Promiscuous Sex (also known as Liz, 1967, lost)
- Depraved! (also known as Sin Sisters 2000 AD, 1967, lost)
- Kiss Me, Kiss Me, Kiss Me! (1968)
- The Ghastly Ones (also known as Blood Rites) (1968)
- Tricks of the Trade (1968, lost)
- The Filthy Five (1968, lost)
- Seeds (also known as Seeds of Sin) (1968)
- Gutter Trash (1968, lost)
- The Bitch (also known as The Mongrel, 1968, unfinished, lost)
- The Weirdo (original version, 1969 - unreleased, lost)
- Torture Dungeon (1969)
- Nightbirds (1970, released on DVD and Blu-ray as part of the BFI Flipside series, Milligan's last black-and-white movie, first UK production)
- Bloodthirsty Butchers (1970)
- The Body Beneath (1970)
- Guru, the Mad Monk (1970)
- Dragula (1971, gay pornographic adult movie - uncredited, lost)
- The Rats Are Coming! The Werewolves Are Here! (1972, also known as Curse of the Full Moon - filmed in 1969)
- The Man with Two Heads (1972, filmed in 1969 - last UK production)
- Fleshpot on 42nd Street (1972)
- Supercool (also known as Sharon) (1973, unfinished, unreleased, lost)
- Blood (1974)
- Legacy of Blood (also known as Legacy of Horror) (1978, remake of The Ghastly Ones)
- House of Seven Belles (1979, released unfinished on the byNWR site)
- Carnage (also known as Hell House, 1984)
- Adventures of Red Rooster (1984 - unreleased television sitcom, six half-hour episodes)
- Monstrosity (1987)
- The Weirdo (1988)
- Surgikill (1988, also known as Screwball Hospital Central)

== Home Media Releases ==
Nightbirds was released on DVD and Blu-ray as part of the BFI Flipside series in 2012.

Severin Films released The Dungeon of Andy Milligan, a 9 disc Blu-ray set, featuring 14 surviving films from Milligan’s NYC and London years, 10+ hours of trailers, outtakes, interviews & audio commentaries, a bonus CD and a 128-page book by Stephen Thrower.

In addition, Severin Films and Monocular Films premiered their original documentary, The Degenerate: The Life & Films of Andy Milligan, in June 2025 at New York City's Tribeca Film Festival. During the making of the documentary, two previously lost Milligan films, The Degenerates and Kiss Me, Kiss Me, Kiss Me! were discovered and restored in 2K. A new Severin Films Blu-ray release is planned for 2026 to include the documentary, the two recently recovered films and other unreleased media.
