= Blood Rites (film) =

1968 American horror film directed by Andy Milligan

- Original theatrical poster
- Directed by: Andy Milligan
- Written by: Andy Milligan; Hal Sherwood
- Produced by: Jerome-Fredric
- Starring: Veronica Radburn; Maggie Rogers; Hal Borske; Anne Linden; Fib LaBlaque; Carol Vogel; Richard Romanus; Eileen Hayes; Don Williams; Hal Sherwood; Neil Flanagan; Ada McAllister; Robert Adsit
- Cinematography: Andy Milligan
- Edited by: Andy Milligan
- Distributed by: J.E.R. Pictures
- Release date: June 9, 1968 (Mexico)
- Running time: 72 minutes
- Country: United States
- Language: English

Blood Rites (original title: The Ghastly Ones) is a 1968 American horror film directed by Andy Milligan. The film is about three sisters who arrive at their father's house according to his dying wish and are soon brutally murdered one by one.

== Plot ==
Three sisters, Veronica, Victoria, and Elizabeth, receive letters from their late father's lawyer informing them that their father wishes they spend three nights in his house on an isolated island before his will can be read. They and their husbands, William, Richard, and Donald, are met there by the two maids, Martha and Ruth, and a hunchback named Colin. While helping with the luggage, Colin becomes angry and catches and eats a live rabbit. The rabbit remains are later found in Veronica and William's bed, along with a note reading, "Blessed are the meek for they shall inherit."

Victoria and Robert find that someone has painted a large 'X' in blood on their bedroom door. Robert and Donald go downstairs to investigate, but Donald collapses after being drugged. Robert investigates the cellar and sees someone he recognizes. Shortly afterward, Victoria finds his body hanging by the ankles on the stairs. The next morning, while discussing what happened, Ruth asks Martha if she had tied up Colin that night.

Colin attempts to tell Victoria something, but is interrupted by Martha and sent to chop firewood in the cellar with Donald (who is given a leather strap to use on Colin). Donald finds a plank of wood with a bloody 'X' on it, but is attacked from behind, gagged, and bound to a workbench before being disemboweled and cut in two by a hooded figure.

At dinner, the guests ask about Donald and Elizabeth's whereabouts. Eventually, Elizabeth's severed head is found in the serving dish when dinner is served.

William enters the cellar to investigate and finds a box and a photograph. However, Colin steals the photo from him, and William is then attacked and killed with a pitchfork by the hooded figure. Later, Martha finds Colin with the photograph and realizes what it means, but she is killed with a hatchet. Colin tries to escape from the killer but is set alight.

It is revealed that Ruth is, in fact, Hattie, the fourth and eldest sister, and she had planned to kill the others and blame Colin so that she could claim the inheritance. Colin is still alive, however, and pushes her down the stairs, causing her hatchet to bury itself in her head. The two remaining sisters, Veronica and Victoria, stare in disbelief.

== Cast ==
- Veronica Radburn as Martha
- Maggie Rogers as Hattie
- Hal Borske as Colin Trask
- Anne Linden as Vicky
- Fib LaBlaque as Rich
- Carol Vogel as Liz
- Richard Romanus as Don
- Eileen Hayes as Veronica
- Don Williams as Bill
- Hal Sherwood as Walter
- Neil Flanagan as Lawyer Dobbs
- Ada McAllister as Ada
- Robert Adsit as Robert

== Production ==
Blood Rites was Andy Milligan's first color film. In order to find a setting for the film, Milligan scouted for locations where he could film in Staten Island, in which he found an old country estate that was built in the late 1800s. Because of the film's extremely low budget of around $13,000, Milligan held several different roles during production. On top of being the film's writer and director, Milligan also worked as the film's costume designer and created all the costumes himself. Milligan also saved over $2,000 on production costs by using camera equipment he already owned; additionally, the film was shot on short ends, using old and leftover 16mm film reels from other local film productions.

The film's gory special effects were limited and had to be used effectively under a limited budget. This included using organs from animals and other practical effects.

== Release ==
=== Home media ===
The film was released for the first time on DVD by Image Entertainment on January 13, 2004 as a part of a special edition, which also included Seeds of Sin.

== Reception ==
The Ghastly Ones has received almost universally negative reviews from critics. DVD Verdict wrote "[Blood Rites] is the only horror film where the aspects of the filmmaking are far more frightening than the slayings themselves". It was awarded a score of 0 out of 4 by VideoHound's Golden Movie Retriever, panning the film's budget and perceived lack of talent. TV Guide gave the film no stars out of five, criticizing the film's noticeable no-budget.

Todd Martin from HorrorNews.net liked the film, writing, "It isn't perfect by a long shot but it is watchable and is a lot of fun in its own odd way. Give it a shot if you are a fan of Milligan's or just if you like low budget flicks that are interesting and fun. I dug it and I think if you give it a chance you will too if you don't take it too seriously."

== Remake ==
Director Milligan remade the film in 1978 as Legacy of Blood.

== See also ==
- List of American films of 1968
