= Lord Darcy =

Lord Darcy may refer to:

- Lord Darcy (character), a detective in an alternate history, created by Randall Garrett
- Lord Darcy Investigates, a collection of short stories by Randall Garrett featuring his alternate history detective Lord Darcy
- Lord Darcy (omnibus), a 1983 omnibus collection of two previous fantasy collections and one fantasy novel by Randall Garrett

== See also ==
- Baron Darcy (disambiguation)
