= T. A. Waters =

American novelist

- Born: Thomas Alan Waters; 1938; Columbus, Ohio
- Died: 1998 (aged 59–60)
- Occupations: Professional author and mentalist
- Known for: magic

Thomas Alan Waters (also known as T.A. Waters) (1938–1998) was an American magician, writer about magic, and science fiction author.

== History ==
Born to Thurston Alan Waters and Pauline Ruth (Kunkle) Waters, T. A. Waters was a professional magician and magic author. He wrote several booklets on mentalism and bizarre magic which were later reassembled in his big book Mind, Myth & Magick (1993). At one point, he was the librarian at the Magic Castle, in Los Angeles.

Waters appears as a character in the Lord Darcy fantasy series by Randall Garrett (thinly veiled as "Sir Thomas Leseaux", an expert on theoretical magic), and in Michael Kurland's The Unicorn Girl (1969) (even more thinly veiled as "Tom Waters"). He himself wrote The Probability Pad (1970), a sequel to The Unicorn Girl; these two novels, together with Chester Anderson's earlier The Butterfly Kid (1967), make up the collaborative Greenwich Village Trilogy.

== Published works ==
- The Psychedelic Spy (1967)
- Love that Spy! (1968)
- The Blackwood Cult (1968) (Lancer Books) (Magnum Books 73769)
- The Probability Pad (1970) (the third volume in the Greenwich Village Trilogy)
- Psychologistics (1971)
- Centerforce (1974)
- Deckalogue (1982)
- Cardiact (1984)
- The Encyclopedia of Magic and Magicians (1988)
- Mind, Myth & Magick (1993)
