= The Eyes Have It =

The Eyes Have It may refer to:

- The Eyes Have It (1928 film), a 1928 film featuring Ben Turpin, Georgia O'Dell and Helen Gilmore
- The Eyes Have It (1931 film), a 1931 film featuring Edgar Bergen/Charlie McCarthy
- The Eyes Have It (film), a 1945 Disney animated short starring Donald Duck and Pluto
- "The Eyes Have It", the first of the Lord Darcy stories by Randall Garrett
- "The Eyes Have It", a 1953 short story by Philip K. Dick
- "The Eyes Have It" (Charmed), a 2003 episode of the television series Charmed
- "The Eyes Have It" (Lois & Clark), a 1995 episode of the television series Lois & Clark: The New Adventures of Superman
- "The Eyes Have It", a 1986 episode of the television series Scarecrow and Mrs. King
- The Eyes Have It (Greyhawk Adventures, Vol. 7), a 1989 fantasy novel by Rose Estes
- "The Eyes Have It", a 1980 single by UK artist Karel Fialka
- "The Eyes Have It", the name of a pin the video game The World Ends With You.
- "The Eyes Have It", a 1950s short story by Ruskin Bond.

See also:

- The ayes have it
