= The Glass of Dyskornis =

The Glass of Dyskornis is a 1982 novel written by Randall Garrett and Vicki Ann Heydron.

== Plot summary ==
The Glass of Dyskornis is a novel in which Ricardo Carillo must earn his place among the warrior brotherhood of cat riders, navigating complex political tensions including an assassination attempt using magical illusions, leading him to a mysterious woman and her father, whose jewel holds secrets beyond its surface. Carillo rides a giant telepathic cat while he is on a quest to find a sacred gemstone of great power, and return it back to the leaders where it belongs.

== Reception ==
Frank Catalano reviewed The Glass of Dyskornis in Amazing Science Fiction (September 1983) and called it "a lot of fun. And the writers have included something I find to be a rather neat narrative device; the 'What Has Gone Before'-type sections at the beginning of each book don't just refresh the reader's memory, but also form an integral part of the plot. It's a nice change."

John T. Sapienza, Jr. reviewed The Steel of Raithskar, The Glass of Dyskornis, and The Bronze of Eddarta for Different Worlds magazine and stated that "It is great fun in the tradition of Burrough's Barsoom novels and Prescott's Scorpio series, and using some of the same pulp-fiction techniques."

== Reviews ==
- Review by Larry D. Woods (1982) in Science Fiction & Fantasy Book Review, #8, October 1982
