= The Unicorn Girl =

1969 novel by Michael Kurland

- Author: Michael Kurland
- Language: English, French, Italian, Portuguese
- Series: Greenwich Village Trilogy
- Genre: Science fiction/fantasy
- Publisher: Pyramid Books
- Publication date: 1969, 2002
- ISBN: 978-1-58715-420-1
- Preceded by: The Butterfly Kid
- Followed by: The Probability Pad

The Unicorn Girl is a science fiction novel by Michael Kurland, originally released in 1969, that follows the adventures of two men from San Francisco in the 1960s after they meet a mysterious young woman looking for her missing unicorn. This novel is the second installment of the Greenwich Village Shared World Trilogy, with Chester Anderson writing the first book (The Butterfly Kid) and the third volume (The Probability Pad) written by T.A. Waters. Kurland, Anderson, and Waters wrote themselves as characters in each book.

== Plot summary ==
Michael is watching Chester's band performing in San Francisco in the 1960s, where he meets the girl of his dreams, Sylvia. She tells Michael she needs help finding her unicorn, Adolphus. After Michael and Chester get to know her, Sylvia explains that she lost Adolphus after she had gotten off of the train. Chester and Michael remember that the last train in their area ran six years ago.

Sylvia explains that she is from the circus and her crew is looking for Adolphus. She got separated from them after she took a winding road. Sylvia asks Chester to play "Barkus is Willing" while she calls Adolphus because he is fond of woodwind music.

When Sylvia sees cars, she does not know what they are. Chester and Michael start to wonder if time travel is involved in how Sylvia came to be with them. While searching by a forest, they meet Sylvia's circus friends - Ronald, Arcturian, and Dorothy. The groups decide to split up to search for Adolphus.

Sylvia reveals she is from 1936. While in the forest they see a UFO. As it's beginning to move closer, they run away. The UFO disappears in sections and the whole group goes through a blip.

They leave the woods they were in and appear in another forest, where they discover a yellow brick road. Sylvia starts crying because going through the blip made her sick. Sylvia reveals that she has been through a blip before, when she was on the train in her own time, that's how she ended up in Michael and Chester's time.

Sylvia hears Dorothy signalling her with a whistle, and whistles back to alert Dorothy of where they are. Dorothy reunites with the group after she hears Sylvia's response. They decide to follow the yellow brick road, where Chester notices the deliberate order of the nature around them and realizes that they're in a garden. A horse-drawn carriage approaches them, and a man named Robin gets out of it to speak with the group. Chester assumes they've been transported into Early Victorian Era. Robin's Aunt, who is traveling with him, and Robin offer the group a ride. (This universe was inspired by Randall Garrett's Lord Darcy)

On their journey with Robin, they run across an orgy in the grass alongside the road, but unlike Sylvia, Michael, Dorothy, and Chester, Robin and his aunt cannot see the orgy. They reach a town called West Mutton and Robin and his aunt offer them a place to stay at the suite they reserved. They have dinner and get introduced to many Victorians, and all the maids begin to take off their clothes. None of the guests notice the maids, even when they steal jewelry from them. The Victorians accuse the group of stealing the jewelry, so the group begins to flee. They realize that if they remove their clothes, no one can see them, so they do so. Sylvia ends up kissing Michael, and they run to the train to escape the angry mob.

Another blip happens while they're on the train, jumping them into another time. In this world, they get stuck with an army troop that demands that Michael and Chester leave Sylvia and Dorothy behind, or else they'll kill them. Sylvia jumps on the commander and kills him, urging the others to launch an attack on the rest of the troop - killing all of them. After looking at the troops, they realize that they've been transported again, this time into a Nazi war zone. Chester and Dorothy are killed by a Tiger tank in the fight.

While trying to escape the Nazis, Sylvia and Michael are blipped to a circus, where they run into Tom. After Sylvia and Michael explain what's happened, Tom realizes they blip in moments of crisis. They proceed to crash a circus performance and blip over a lake.

Once they get out of the water, they're summoned by soldiers to meet Lord Gart. The New England government is suspicious of all the travelers coming to their area and want to learn more about it, so the group decides to meet with them so they can trade information. They're asked to record all of their travels and then meet with Lord Gart for dinner. They learn that, in this universe, magic is real.

They are asked to do experiments to recreate the feeling of blipping with Sir Thomas. New England is experiencing an exponential increase of visitors from other worlds and the government is worried that an ending is coming. They finally find Sylvia's unicorn, Adolphus, in this world when he is brought to them. Chester and Dorothy, no longer dead, find Michael. After talking about their experiences, the group concludes that Chester and Dorothy didn't actually die - the Chester and Dorothy of that other world did.

After two weeks, Sir Thomas discovers that all worlds from all universes are merging into one. He tells them they have to destroy a machine to stop the blips and everyone will return to their original world. Michael and Sylvia learn that if they tightly hold hands, they may be able to return to the same world. They blip again to a world filled with dinosaurs, but Chester falls into a beam of light in the process. Reality begins to break apart and Sylvia yells for her and Chester to hold hands, but they don't make it in time. Chester, Tom, and Michael are transported back to their timeline without Sylvia, Dorothy, and Adolphus.

Back in his own time, Michael Kurland asks Sir Thomas to contact him through his website or email.

== Main characters ==
- Michael Kurland—protagonist and author who is helping Sylvia find her missing unicorn
- Chester Anderson (based on the author of The Butterfly Kid, the first book in the Greenwich Village Trilogy)—Michael's friend; travels with Sylvia and Michael to find Sylvia's unicorn
- Tom Waters (based on the author of the third book in the Greenwich Village Trilogy, The Probability Pad)—professional magician, friend of Chester and Michael who had disappeared prior to the events of the book
- Sylvia—the Unicorn Girl, the girl of Michael's dreams who is looking for her lost unicorn
- Dorothy—a tall, beautiful, red-haired girl; a member of the circus

== Minor characters ==
- Ronald—a centaur and member of Sylvia's circus crew
- Arcturian (stage name Giganto)—a cyclops from the circus
- Adolphus—Sylvia's unicorn
- Sir Thomas—a man in New England researching the source of the blips and searching for a means to end them
- Robin—a man who offers them a ride and place to stay in the Victorian era
- Lord Gart—ruler of New England, also searching for the source of the blips

== History ==
This book was published in 1969 after Kurland met Chester Anderson, who wrote The Butterfly Kid, the first novel in the Greenwich Village Trilogy. Anderson was a poet in the Greenwich Village; Kurland had recently returned from traveling with the United States Army in Europe. The pair decided to abandon their previous career goals and become science fiction authors. Kurland was influenced by his group of friends, all of whom bore unusual names, such as Bob "The Pope" Silverberg and Willy "The Professor" Ley.

Together Anderson and Kurland wrote Ten Years to Doomsday, deliberately emulating the style of Poul Anderson. The book was published by Pyramid Books; Ed Emshwiller illustrated the cover.

Anderson subsequently wrote The Butterfly Kid, basing the hero and sidekick on himself and Kurland and telling the story from the perspective of the character Chester. He suggested Kurland write the sequel. Kurland's original idea was to retell the story from the perspective of the character Michael, rather than telling a story that followed that of The Butterfly Kid, but eventually settled on writing a more traditional sequel instead.

== Reception ==
James Nicoll reviewed the book, stating that it was "exactly the cheerful light comedy it set out to be" and noting that "Somewhat atypically for the time, the two women in the group—Sylvia and Dorothy—manage to kick serious ass."
