= Too Many Magicians =

1966 novel by Randall Garrett

- Cover of 1966 first edition (hardcover)
- Author: Randall Garrett
- Cover artist: Karen Eisen
- Language: English
- Series: Lord Darcy series
- Genre: Fantasy, Science fiction, Alternate history, Mystery
- Publisher: Doubleday
- Publication date: 1966
- Publication place: United States
- Media type: Print (Hardcover & Paperback)
- Pages: 260
- Preceded by: Murder and Magic
- Followed by: Lord Darcy Investigates

Too Many Magicians is a novel by Randall Garrett, an American science fiction author. One of several stories starring Lord Darcy, it was first serialized in Analog Science Fiction in 1966 and published in book form the same year by Doubleday. It was later gathered together with Murder and Magic (1979) and Lord Darcy Investigates (1981) into the omnibus collection Lord Darcy (1983, expanded 2002). The novel was nominated for the Hugo Award for Best Novel in 1967.

The Lord Darcy character also appears in several other novellas and short stories by Garrett, but this is his only novel-length Lord Darcy story. Michael Kurland has written two further novels set in the Lord Darcy universe.

== Plot introduction ==
The novel takes place in 1966. However, it occurs in a world with an alternative history. The Plantagenet kings survived and rule a large Anglo-French Empire. In addition, around A.D. 1300 the laws of magic were discovered and magical science developed. The physical sciences were never pursued. The society looks early Victorian, though medical magic is superior to our medicine.

The book uses the conventions of a detective story. The protagonist is Lord Darcy, Chief Investigator for the Duke of Normandy. This Sherlock Holmes-like figure is assisted by Master Sean O’Lochlainn, a forensic sorcerer.

The novel is a locked room mystery, which takes place at a wizards’ convention. Garrett delights in puns. Analogues of Nero Wolfe, Archie Goodwin, James Bond and Gandalf the Grey appear.

== Reception ==
David R. Dunham reviewed Too Many Magicians for Different Worlds magazine and stated that "Too Many Magicians is a novel, and best develops the alternative universe."

== Reviews ==
- Review by P. Schuyler Miller (1968) in Analog Science Fiction/Science Fact, June 1968
- Review by P. Schuyler Miller (1970) in Analog Science Fiction/Science Fact, August 1970
- Review by Baird Searles (1979) in Isaac Asimov's Science Fiction Magazine, May 1979
- Review by Spider Robinson (1980) in Analog Science Fiction/Science Fact, February 1980
- Review by Ian Williams (1980) in Paperback Inferno, Volume 4, Number 1
