= The Steel of Raithskar =

The Steel of Raithskar is a 1981 novel written by Randall Garrett and Vicki Ann Heydron.

== Plot summary ==
The Steel of Raithskar is a novel in which Ricardo Carillo dies on Earth and awakens in the body of a recently slain warrior, stranded in the desert with his giant telepathically linked feline warmount companion, and must convince the creature to work with him, and then deal with the challenges of his new identity as the warrior. Carillo learns that the body belonged to the son of a local leader, who was on the run after being accused of both murder and stealing a sacred gemstone of great power.

== Reception ==
Frank Catalano reviewed The Steel of Raithskar in Amazing Science Fiction (September 1983) and described it as "hard to classify as SF or fantasy in that some very good explanations, or rather rationalizations, are given by the characters to explain what goes on. But the feel of the books is not too different from that of an updated Arabian Nights fantasy, complete with swordplay and a desert world."

John T. Sapienza Jr. reviewed The Steel of Raithskar, The Glass of Dyskornis, and The Bronze of Eddarta for Different Worlds magazine and stated that "It is great fun in the tradition of Burrough's Barsoom novels and Prescott's Scorpio series, and using some of the same pulp-fiction techniques."

== Reviews ==
- Review by J. Grant Thiessen (1981) in The Science Fiction Collector 14
- Review by Theodore Sturgeon (1981) in Rod Serling's The Twilight Zone Magazine, July 1981
- Review by Barry N. Malzberg (1982) in The Magazine of Fantasy & Science Fiction, June 1982
