= Ten Little Wizards =

1988 novel by Michael Kurland

- cover art from first edition
- Author: Michael Kurland
- Cover artist: James Warhola
- Language: English
- Series: Lord Darcy series
- Genre: Fantasy, Science fiction, Alternate history
- Publisher: Ace Books
- Publication date: 1988
- Publication place: United States
- Media type: Print (Paperback)
- Pages: 188 p.
- ISBN: 0-441-80057-2
- OCLC: 17729826
- Preceded by: Lord Darcy Investigates
- Followed by: A Study in Sorcery

Ten Little Wizards is an alternate history mystery novel by Michael Kurland featuring Randall Garrett's fictional detective Lord Darcy. It was first published in paperback by Ace Books in March 1988; a trade paperback edition and ebook edition were issued by the Borgo Press imprint of Wildside Press in 2011. An audio-book version was published by Audible Studios in April 2015. The book has been translated into Italian.

The Lord Darcy stories are set in an alternate world whose history supposedly diverged from our own during the reign of King Richard the Lionheart, in which King John never reigned and most of western Europe and the Americas are united in an Angevin Empire whose continental possessions were never lost by that king. In this world a magic-based technology has developed in place of the science of our own world.

The title is an allusion to Agatha Christie's Ten Little Niggers, also published as Ten Little Indians, a classic of detective literature which is now almost always referred to by its US title, And Then There Were None.

== Plot summary ==
Someone is killing wizards, and doing so apparently without the use of magic. Lord Darcy is sent to investigate. He must uncover the murderer and ascertain whether the whole business is a ploy to kill the king himself.

To complicate matters Darcy must investigate during the preparations for the investiture of Gwiliam, Duke of Lancaster (King John IV's younger son), as Prince of Gaul. To add international tension, the Crown Prince of Poland, His Majesty the King of Courland (Latvia), will attend the ceremony. (In this timeline, Poland is a great empire ruling most of Eastern Europe, and there is an ongoing Cold War between it and Darcy's Anglo-French Empire).

== Reception ==
The book was reviewed by Tom Whitmore in Locus no. 324, January 1988, and Don D'Ammassa in Science Fiction Chronicle no. 104, May 1988.
