= The Bitter End (short story) =

1978 short story by Randall Garrett

"The Bitter End" is a science fantasy short story by American writer Randall Garrett, featuring his alternate history detective Lord Darcy and magician Master Sean. It was first published in Isaac Asimov's Science Fiction Magazine and has been included in the second edition of the collection Lord Darcy.

The Lord Darcy stories are set in an alternate world whose history supposedly diverged from our own during the reign of King Richard the Lionheart, in which King John never reigned. Most of Western Europe and the Americas are united in an Angevin Empire whose continental possessions were never lost by that king. In this world, a magic-based technology has developed in place of the science of our own world.

== Plot summary ==
Master Sean O'Lochlainn, the Irish forensic sorcerer, visits Paris — in this history, a sleepy provincial city which ceased to be a capital many centuries earlier — on a mission to collect evidence for an impending court case. While he takes a break in a hotel bar, a man in a booth is found dead. The police soon arrive, in the shape of bumbling but tenacious Sergeant Cougair Chasseur, for whom Sean casts a preservation spell over the deceased's body until a post mortem can be conducted. But Sean is flabbergasted to be named as a possible murder suspect by Chasseur, who distrusts magic and follows the theory of 'least likely suspect'.

Sean is eventually exonerated and able to investigate the circumstances of the death of the man, identified as a retired officer of the Imperial Legion, formerly stationed in Mechicoe (Mexico). He discovers that the deceased has been poisoned whilst drinking Popacotapetl, a very sweet liqueur made in Mechicoe, which has been laced with a bitter poison made from coyotl weed. However, he had been treated with a spell by a Healer, after which all drugs — including the one he is taking for malaria — taste sweet to him.

Eventually, the victim's wife, a much younger woman of Mechicain descent and who is conducting an illicit affair with a liqueur merchant, is unmasked.
