= Mark Phillips (author) =

American novelist

Brain Twister by Mark Phillips (Pyramid Books, 1962)

Mark Phillips was the joint pseudonym used by science fiction writers Laurence Mark Janifer and Randall Philip Garrett in the early 1960s. Together they authored several humorous short novels in the so-called "Psi-Power" series: Brain Twister (1962), The Impossibles (1963), and Supermind (1963). For Brain Twister they were nominated for the Hugo Award for Best Novel in 1960 (under the novel's original title, "That Sweet Little Old Lady"). They also co-authored the novel Pagan Passions (1959) with Garrett using his own name and Janifer using his Larry M. Harris pseudonym.

== Laurence Janifer and Randall Garrett ==
Laurence Janifer was a prolific science fiction author, with a career spanning over 50 years. Though his first published work was a short story in Cosmos magazine in 1953, his career as a writer can be said to have started in 1959 when he began writing for Astounding and Galaxy Science Fiction. Janifer's best known work is the "Survivor" series, comprising five novels and many short stories.

In the early 1960s Janifer teamed with Randall Garrett, a prolific contributor to Astounding and other science fiction magazines who is today best known for the Lord Darcy books. In hopes of replicating the success of spy stories such as James Bond (which were hugely popular at the time), the pair decided to combine a traditional spy narrative with humor and extra-sensory perception to appeal to readers of science fiction.

== Psi-Power Series ==
The first story they wrote in this so-called "Psi-Power" series was "That Sweet Little Old Lady," published in the Sept./October 1959 edition of Analog Science Fiction and Science Fact. Subsequent stories including "Out Like a Light" (Analog, April/May/June 1960), and "Occasion for Disaster" (Analog, November/December 1960 and January/February 1961). All of the stories were novella length and were subsequently reprinted in 1962 and 1963 by Pyramid Books under different titles ("That Sweet Little Old Lady" as Brain Twister, "Out Like a Light" as The Impossibles, and "Occasion for Disaster" as Supermind).

"That Sweet Little Old Lady" (Brain Twister) was nominated for the Hugo Award for Best Novel in 1960 but lost out to Starship Troopers by Robert A. Heinlein.

Laurence Janifer and Randall Garrett did not work together on any other stories after the completion of the Psi-Power series.

== Texts online ==
- Brain Twister, Pyramid Publications, (1962).
- The Impossibles, Pyramid Publications, 1963, 2nd edition, 1966.
- Supermind, Pyramid Publications, (1963).
