= A Study in Sorcery =

1989 novel by Michael Kurland

- First edition cover art
- Author: Michael Kurland
- Cover artist: James Warhola
- Language: English
- Series: Lord Darcy series
- Genre: Fantasy, Science fiction, Alternate history
- Publisher: Ace Books
- Publication date: 1989
- Publication place: United States
- Media type: Print (Paperback)
- Pages: 184 p.
- ISBN: 0-441-79092-5
- OCLC: 19805536
- LC Class: CPB Box no. 1752 vol. 11
- Preceded by: Ten Little Wizards

A Study in Sorcery is an alternate history mystery novel by Michael Kurland featuring Randall Garrett's fictional detective character Lord Darcy. It was first published in paperback by Ace Books in 1989; a trade paperback edition was issued by the Borgo Press imprint of Wildside Press in May 2011, followed by an ebook edition from the same publisher in July of the same year, reissued in February 2019. An audio-book version was published by Audible Studios in February 2012.

The Lord Darcy stories are set in an alternate world whose history supposedly diverged from our own during the reign of King Richard the Lionheart, in which King John never reigned and most of western Europe and the Americas are united in an Angevin Empire whose continental possessions were never lost by that king. In this world a magic-based technology has developed in place of the science of our own world.

== Plot summary ==
In New England (a term which in this history includes the whole of our North America) an Azteque Prince is found dead on a stone altar.

Lord Darcy and Sean O Lochlainn are sent across the Atlantic to investigate. Darcy must identify the killer and determine whether the Azteques are returning to human sacrifice. Perhaps an attempt is being made by the rival Polish Empire to upset the balance of power between the Angevin Empire and the Azteques?

== Reception ==
The book was reviewed by John C. Bunnell in Dragon Magazine, September 1989.
