= The Bronze of Eddarta =

The Bronze of Eddarta is a 1983 novel written by Randall Garrett and Vicki Ann Heydron.

== Plot summary ==
The Bronze of Eddarta is a novel in which Ricardo Carillo embarks with his reluctant lieutenant and an illusionist on a pursuit of the master magician, who is plotting to use a sacred jewel to gain more power. Carillo is on a quest to find the sacred gemstone, which the man whose body he now inhabits was accused of stealing before he died, so Carillo wants to clear his name and return the gemstone back to its proper caretakers in the government.

== Reception ==
Frank Catalano reviewed The Bronze of Eddarta in Amazing Science Fiction (September 1983) and stated that "Unfortunately, where I was hoping for all the loose ends to be wrapped up in the third book, I was disappointed. It turns out six more volumes are planned in this extended CYCLE. So while the original quest plotline is wrapped up, some larger questions — such as how in the world Carillo got where he is — are left unanswered."

John T. Sapienza Jr. reviewed The Steel of Raithskar, The Glass of Dyskornis, and The Bronze of Eddarta for Different Worlds magazine and stated that "It is great fun in the tradition of Burrough's Barsoom novels and Prescott's Scorpio series, and using some of the same pulp-fiction techniques."
