= The Queen Bee (Garrett story) =

1958 short story by Randall Garrett

"The Queen Bee" is a science fiction short story by Randall Garrett. First published in Astounding Science Fiction in December 1958, it has drawn harsh criticism in the following decades, with Michael Dirda of The Washington Post noting that it is "often regarded as the most sexist short story in the history of science fiction".

== Synopsis ==
When four men and three women are shipwrecked on an alien planet, the men tell the women that they are henceforth legally required to form a colony and immediately begin having as many children as possible (and regularly switch partners, so as to ensure maximum genetic diversity), with the women's lack of consent being considered irrelevant. One woman acquiesces; a second is beaten until she acquiesces; and the third kills the other two so that, as the sole remaining female on the planet, she will be too valuable for the men to mistreat. The men then lobotomize her. The story ends with her giving birth to her first daughter.

== Reception ==
James Nicoll described "The Queen Bee" as "so egregiously wretched that it inspires mockery and disparagement decades after publication", and posited that Poul Anderson's 1960 story "Eve Times Four" — wherein four women in a parallel situation discover that no such legal requirement exists, that the planet on which they landed already had human colonies, and that their male companion had arranged the entire situation as an excuse to commit rape by deception — was written as a direct response. Nicoll similarly identified a section of John Varley's 1976 short story "In the Hall of the Martian Kings" as "yet another reaction to [the] loathsome 'Queen Bee'", adding that he was "pretty sure there are enough SF stories tossing rocks at that particular Garrett [story] to fill an anthology. An angry, angry anthology." Galactic Journey considered that the term 'misogyny' did not "adequately convey the sentiment" in the story, and suggested instead "hatred of women", noting that it begins with the viewpoint character hitting a woman. PZ Myers was far more direct, calling it a "monstrosity".

Gordon van Gelder, introducing the story in his 2017 anthology Go Forth and Multiply: Twelve Tales of Repopulation, noted that it is "justly reviled". Vonda N. McIntyre and Susan Janice Anderson, when introducing their 1976 anthology of feminist science fiction Aurora: Beyond Equality, specifically mentioned "The Queen Bee" as the type of story which should be excluded from the anthology, but stated that it may have "symbolic truth", in that "(w)omen in our society are conditioned to develop their physical attractiveness as a 'weapon' to 'kill off' other female competition. Confinement to a single role is, in a sense, a sort of psychic lobotomy."

In 2009, Darrell Schweitzer explored the story in an essay in The New York Review of Science Fiction. Based on its dissimilarity to the bulk of Garrett's oeuvre, he proposed that its premise may have been a suggestion from Astounding editor John W. Campbell, who was known as a contrarian and provocateur. As well, Schweitzer compared "The Queen Bee" to Tom Godwin's controversial 1954 story "The Cold Equations", as "(b)oth stories are about characters in tight spots making tough choices based on laws of the universe which respect neither persons nor gentler emotions"; however, he emphasized that, "despite [its] numerous contrivances", the theme of Godwin's story — "the physics of mass, thrust, and ballistics cannot be argued with" — remains valid, whereas "The Queen Bee" is, "(to) use an esoteric, quasi-academic, technical term (...) bullshit." In particular, he pointed out that a "legal requirement" is not a physical law but a social convention, and that it is not possible to breed a planetary population from one single human woman, ultimately concluding that the story "does not make sense", and that its "core message" — which he phrased as "all a woman's good for is breeding" — is "appalling".

== Title ==
Vicki Ann Heydron stated that John W. Campbell changed the story's title to "The Queen Bee" without consulting Garrett — a change of which Garrett "approved wholeheartedly", because it was "outstandingly more appropriate" than the original title (which he had forgotten by the time he told her of this).
