= The Eyes Have It (Lord Darcy story) =

1964 short story by Randall Garrett

"The Eyes Have It" is a fantasy short story by Randall Garrett, the first to feature his alternate history detective Lord Darcy. It was first published in Analog Science Fiction and Fact in 1964 and included in the collection Murder and Magic in 1979.

The story is set in an alternate world whose history diverged from our own during the reign of King Richard the Lionheart, in which most of western Europe and the Americas are united in an Angevin Empire and ruled under a feudal system. In this world, a magic-based technology has developed, largely replacing the science of our own world.

== Plot summary ==
Detective Lord Darcy is called upon to investigate the apparent murder of Count D'Evreux, who was found shot in his bedroom. A gun is found hidden nearby, and Darcy's assistant, sorcerer Sean O'Lochlainn, determines by magic that it was used to kill the Count. Further investigation reveals that the late Count had had frequent liaisons with young women of the area, whom he would invite to visit via a hidden entrance, making it difficult to discover who might have visited on the night he died.

Laird and Lady Duncan are visiting the area from Scotland. Lady Duncan has previously had an affair with the Count, and visited him before his death. The gun appears to belong to her. Her husband is found to have been practicing unlicensed sorcery so, although the actual killing did not appear to have involved magic, both are suspected.

Darcy and O'Lochlainn decide to try using optography to extract an image of the killer from the dead Count's eyes. It is explained that such an image can be extracted in certain rare circumstances, but the images are unreliable and cannot be used in court. The process provides a clear image of an unusually beautiful woman in the act of shooting a gun at the Count, but her face is not recognized.

Lord Darcy interviews the Count's sister, who stands to inherit his position. She tries to tell him something about the case but Darcy stops her and lays out the evidence he has collected. On the night of his death, the Count had a heated argument with Lady Duncan in which she pulled out a gun and he threw her out of the room, leaving the gun on a table. Laird Duncan, misunderstanding the situation, tried to kill the Count by sorcery but found he was already dead. The killer was the unknown woman in the picture, who Darcy says will be found.

Privately, Darcy tells his employer, Duke Richard of Normandy, that he has in fact identified the killer. The Count had had an obsessive attraction to his own sister for years, but had kept it secret. After the argument with Lady Duncan he invited his sister to his suite and assaulted her, and she shot him in self-defense with the gun. The picture that had been extracted from the Count's eyes did not match the Countess' appearance because it had been based on his internal, idealized image of her. Such pictures are always affected by the victim's mind, which is why they are inadmissible in court.

These details are kept secret to protect the family's reputation. The Duke comments that the way the Countess defended herself and then hid her involvement shows her judgement and ability to act under pressure, which will aid her in her new role.

== Critical reception ==
Garrett won the Sidewise Award for Alternate History Special Achievement Award in 1999 for the Lord Darcy series, specifically including Murder and Magic.
