= Optography =

Retrieval of an image from the retina of an eye

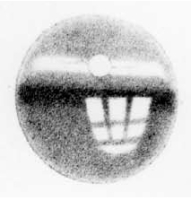
One of Wilhelm Kühne's rabbit optograms from 1878. The window the rabbit was facing appears to be discernible in the image.

Optography is the process of viewing or retrieving an optogram, an image on the retina of the eye. A belief that the eye "recorded" the last image seen before death was widespread in the late 19th and early 20th centuries, and was a frequent plot device in fiction of the time, to the extent that police photographed the victims' eyes in several real-life murder investigations, in case the theory was true. The concept has been repeatedly debunked as a forensic method.

== Scientific basis ==
Much of the scientific work on optography was performed by the German physiologist Wilhelm Kühne. Inspired by Franz Christian Boll's discovery of rhodopsin (or "visual purple")—a photosensitive pigment present in the rods of the retina—Kühne discovered that, under ideal circumstances, the rhodopsin could be "fixed" like a photographic negative.

Kühne experimented on numerous animals to refine the process and determine the chemicals used to fix the image on the retina. His most successful optogram was obtained from an albino rabbit, with its head fastened to face a barred window. The rabbit's head was covered for several minutes to allow rhodopsin to accumulate on the retina. It was then uncovered for three minutes to expose it to the light, then decapitated and its eyeball sliced from top to bottom. The rear half of the eye was placed in an alum solution to enable fixation of the bleached rhodopsin, which resulted in a distinct image of the barred windows.

=== Optography in the human eye ===
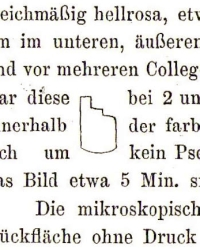
Line drawing by Wilhelm Kühne of the only "human optogram", an image from the retina of executed prisoner Erhard Gustav Reif.

Kühne was eager to demonstrate the technique in a human subject, and in 1880, got the opportunity. On 16 November, Erhard Gustav Reif was executed by guillotine for the murder of his children in the nearby town of Bruchsal. Reif's eyes were extracted and delivered to Kühne's laboratory at the University of Heidelberg, where he set about dissecting them in a darkened room with filtered windows. After ten minutes, Kühne showed his colleagues an image on the left retina, but his sketch of the image did not appear to match any object visible to the subject at the time of his death—although the outline of the image resembled a guillotine blade, Reif was blindfolded at the time of his beheading.

An issue that Kühne encountered when attempting to produce an image from a human eye is that the size of the fovea centralis, the actual focal point of the image on the retina, is very small (about 1.5 millimetres). Kühne had considerably more success producing optograms from animals such as rabbits and frogs, and the Reif image ended up being the only known "human optogram". The original image from Reif's eye no longer exists, apart from a simple line drawing of the shape in Kühne's 1881 paper "Observations for Anatomy and Physiology of the Retina".

== Forensic optography ==
With the theory that the eye retained an image at the moment of death rampant in the Victorian imagination, police investigators in the late 1800s began considering optography as an investigative technique in murder cases. One of the earliest known attempts at forensic optography occurred in 1877, when Berlin police photographed the eyes of murder victim Frau von Sabatzky, on the chance that the image would assist in solving the crime.

In 1888, London police officer Walter Dew—later known for catching the murderer Dr Crippen—recalled optography being attempted on Mary Jane Kelly in what he called a "forlorn hope" of catching her suspected killer, Jack the Ripper. Ripperologist James Stewart-Gordon believed the technique was attempted on Annie Chapman as well.

W.C. Ayres, an American physician who assisted Kühne in his laboratory and translated his papers into English, dismissed the theory that optography on a human eye could yield a usable image for forensic purposes. In an 1881 article in the New York Medical Journal, Ayres stated that his own repeated experiments in the field had produced some optogram images, but they were not distinct enough to be useful, and he declared it "utterly idle to look for the picture of a man's face, or of the surroundings, on the retina of a person who has met with a sudden death, even in the most favorable circumstances".

A rare case of forensic optography being admitted as evidence occurred in late 1924, after German merchant Fritz Angerstein had been charged with killing eight members of his family and household staff. Doehne, a professor at the University of Cologne photographed the retinas of two of the victims, yielding what he claimed were images of Angerstein's face and an axe used to kill the gardener. Angerstein was tried, convicted and executed, with Doehne's optographic images included amongst other evidence in the case. According to the Sunday Express newspaper, when told of the "incriminating" optograms, Angerstein confessed to the murders. The American Mercury magazine called Doehne's testimony "scientific confirmation" of the theory of optography, although in 2011, the German Legal Tribune Online called the use of optographic evidence in the Angerstein case "absurde Kriminalistik" ("absurd forensics").

The most recent serious research into the use of optography in criminology occurred in 1975, when police in Heidelberg asked Evangelos Alexandridis at the University of Heidelberg to reevaluate Kühne's experiments and findings with modern scientific techniques, knowledge and equipment. Like Kühne, Alexandridis successfully produced a number of distinct high-contrast images from the eyes of rabbits, but conclusively negatively assessed the technique as a forensic tool.

== Optography in fiction ==
The first apparent description of optography in fiction was in Auguste Villiers de l'Isle-Adam's 1867 short story "Claire Lenoir", later expanded into the novel Tribulat Bonhomet in 1887. Like the reference in Rudyard Kipling's 1891 short story "At the End of the Passage", Villiers de l'Isle-Adam's story portrays the optogram in a metaphysical sense, rather than scientific.

Jules Verne's 1902 novel, Les Frères Kip (The Brothers Kip), contains a reference to optography as a key plot point. The Kip brothers of the title are arrested and imprisoned for the murder of a ship's captain. When the victim's son examines an enlarged photograph of his late father's head, he discerns in the eyes the faces of the true murderers—two of the captain's shipmates—and the brothers are exonerated. Verne explained the scientific basis of the conclusion in the book's final chapter:

For some time now it has been known—as a result of various interesting ophthalmological experiments done by certain ingenious scientists, authoritative observers that they are—that the image of exterior objects imprinted upon the retina of the eye are conserved there indefinitely. The organ of vision contains a particular substance, retinal purple, on which is imprinted in their exact form these images. They have even been perfectly reconstituted when the eye, after death, is removed and soaked in an alum bath.

In H.P. Lovecraft's short story "Out of the Aeons", the image of the Great Old One Ghatanothoa was kept on priest T'yog's retina after his death.

The 1936 Universal film The Invisible Ray features a scene in which Dr. Felix Benet (Bela Lugosi) uses an ultra-violet camera to photograph the dead eyes of Sir Francis Stevens (Walter Kingsford), who was murdered by Dr. Janos Rukh (Boris Karloff). The image developed by Benet shows Rukh to be the killer, but Benet drops the photographic plate, accidentally destroying the evidence.

Randall Garrett's 1964 fantasy story The Eyes Have It has an image magically developed from the retina of a corpse in a murder investigation. The image is said to be the result of the victim's visual system "backfiring" due to extreme shock, causing the picture in his mind to be returned to the retina.

Jim Morrison mentions Kuhne's experiments on rabbits in his text "Jim Morrison Raps" published in "Eye" magazine, October 1, 1968.

Italian film-maker Dario Argento's 1971 film Four Flies on Grey Velvet has characters use optography in an attempt to catch a murderer, with the description of the resulting image lending the film its title.

In the 1972 film Horror Express, various unearthly murders aboard a trans-Siberian train are investigated with a couple of autopsies, during which it is discovered that images are retained in a liquid found inside the eyeball of the corpse, which reveal a prehistoric Earth and a view of the planet seen from space and it is deduced that the threat is somehow a formless extraterrestrial that inhabited the body of the creature and now resides within a police inspector—the intelligence can "jump" from victim to victim via the eye—leaving the eyeball white and opaque (like that of a boiled fish.)

In the 1975 Doctor Who serial "The Ark in Space", the Fourth Doctor applies the theory with some of the ocular tissue of the alien Wirrn to project not just still images, but moving, video footage of the last moments of life of the Wirrn Queen thousands of years in the past. The Doctor likens it to an old Gypsy belief of the "eye retaining the last image after death", something not "too far from the truth". Thirty-eight years later, the 2013 Doctor Who episode "The Crimson Horror", set in Victorian England, portrays the character of Madame Vastra dismissing the validity of optography, until shown an image of the Eleventh Doctor in a dead man's eye. The image is explained as having registered after the victim was submerged in a chemical substance which caused his eyes to retain a latent image.

In the 1986 Manga Saint Seiya, there's an episode in which Ikki receives a warning from Black Cygnus' eye.

In the 1994 RoboCop: The Series, the first episode "The Future of Law Enforcement" Robocop takes a blurred image from a corpse's retina and then enhances it using a computer.

In Caleb Carr's 1994 book The Alienist optography is attempted, unsuccessfully, to identify a serial killer.

The 1999 film Wild Wild West features a scene where Artemis Gordon obtains a clue by projecting the optograms of a dead scientist on to a wall (much to the disgust of his colleague James West).

In 2007, the visual artist Derek Ogbourne created his 'Museum of Optography', after the trauma of being thumped in the eye a few years earlier. A series of art exhibitions that had at their central core the idea of 'The Last Image' bleached on to the retina at the moment of death. His museum consisted of 300 works, four catalogues and his Encyclopedia of Optography that imperceptibly blended historical fact with fiction.

In the 2008 series Fringe ("The Same Old Story", season 1 episode 2), Walter uses an optographic image taken from the optic nerve of a woman killed whilst under the effect of a paralytic toxin to track down and arrest her murderer.

In the 2018 cyberpunk film Upgrade, the hitman Fisk Brantner uses a cybernetic implant embedded within his index finger to watch a playback of Tolan's (an associate of Fisk) final moments before being killed by Grey, recorded via optical implants within of Tolan's lenses.
