= The Whenabouts of Burr =

1975 novel by Michael Kurland

- Cover from first edition
- Author: Michael Kurland
- Illustrator: Jack Gaughan
- Cover artist: Kelly Freas
- Language: English
- Genre: Science fiction
- Publisher: DAW Books
- Publication date: 1975
- Publication place: United States
- Media type: Print (paperback)
- Pages: 158
- ISBN: 0-87997-182-7
- OCLC: 1620843

The Whenabouts of Burr is a science fiction novel by American writer Michael Kurland. It was first published in paperback by DAW Books in July 1975, with a new edition issued in trade paperback and ebook by Wildside Press in October and December 2015, respectively. The book has also been translated into German.

According to the author in his introduction to the second edition, "[t]he general outline of the book and the first 20 or so pages were written jointly" with Avram Davidson.

== Plot summary ==
In the future America of 1997, the slightly paranoid Victor Gosport is president, and faces a crisis: the original of the U.S. Constitution, carefully preserved in the National Archives, appears to have been stolen and replaced by an apparently equally authentic variant—one on which Alexander Hamilton's signature has been replaced by that of Aaron Burr! Naturally, the mystery must be solved and the true constitution recovered, and equally obviously must be concealed from the public, last there be panic in the streets. But who can be trusted to investigate? Not the traditional intelligence agencies, whom Gosport half suspects of concocting the whole mess to embarrass him! Fortunately, the president has his own confidential agents, Nate Swift of the Bureau of Weights and Measures, and his civilian crony Ves Romero.

They begin by advertising for any unusual information about Burr. Soon other odd artifacts are turning up—old coins and stamps characterizing Burr as having been Emperor of Mexico or President of the United States—neither of which ever happened. More pertinently, their inquiries attract attention from a surprising and unusual source with his own interest in Burr—Alexander Hamilton, seemingly stepped straight out of the early nineteenth century! He and they each try to pump each other on what they know, in each instance unsatisfactorily.

Tailing Hamilton, Nate and Ves find themselves on an odyssey through a seemingly endless number of parallel worlds, notably one in which the U.S. had developed into a repressive aristocratic republic, another in which Hamilton and various other variants of the U.S.'s founding fathers are attempting to establish an ideal government in an America never colonized by Europe, and, most dangerously, an America under occupation and attack by malevolent aliens. They pick up unusual allies along the way—Hamilton, a Russian baroness from a still-Czarist Russia, who aids them partly on account of the historical friendship between their two countries, and ultimately Aaron Burr himself, leading an airship expedition to explore yet more alternate worlds.

The Hamilton and Burr the protagonists encounter turn out to be versions whose famous duel was observed and disrupted by tourists from the prime earth that originally discovered the secret of dimensional and time travel. As a result, both survived to go on to new adventures in the multiverse. Hamilton retains his suspicions of his former antagonist and obsessively tries to keep track of him, while Burr just wants to put it all behind him and live his own life. But between them they point Nate and Ves in the right direction—whoever might have nicked their world's Constitution, it's almost certainly a prime earther, as only someone with access to crosstime technology could have managed the switch.

From there everything falls into place. The culprit is identified, and the Constitutions switched back. The Burr variant turns out to have been the true target of theft, being a rare one, and had been exchanged for the version Nate and Ves are after in order to hide the booty in a place and dimension it would not likely be looked for.

== Reception ==
Lester del Rey, writing in Analog Science Fiction/Science Fact, notes "I've liked some of Kurland's stories very much," but scores the author for getting certain historical dates wrong, as well some from the novel's present, observing that he "can't keep either real history or his future history straight." He calls "[t]he basic idea for the novel ... rather good. ... Some of the novel is amusing, and several of the incidents are interesting." But "[u]nfortunately, the intent here seems to be to be humorous" and "it is the humor best described as funny writing. ... Word play, funny names, distorted character, overstatement--that type of stuff. And naturally, since this is humor, the plotting doesn't have to be too interesting. Things can just happen, provided they are amusing. ... So we have an ending where the solution to everything is achieved by a much too simple means."

The novel was also reviewed by Allan Danzig in The Science Fiction Review (Monthly), July 1975, Frederick Patten in Delap's F & SF Review, September 1975, Lynne Holdom in Science Fiction Review, November 1975, Samuel Mines in Luna Monthly #66, Winter 1976, and Harald Pusch (in German) in Science Fiction Times, Dezember 1983.
