= The Dawning Light =

1959 novel by Robert Silverberg and Randall Garrett

- Dust-jacket of the first edition
- Author: Robert Randall (pseudonym of Robert Silverberg and Randall Garrett)
- Cover artist: W.I. van der Poel
- Language: English
- Genre: Science fiction
- Publisher: Gnome Press
- Publication date: 1959
- Publication place: United States
- Media type: Print (hardcover)
- Pages: 191
- Preceded by: The Shrouded Planet

The Dawning Light is a 1959 science fiction novel published under the name Robert Randall, collaborative pseudonym of American writers Robert Silverberg and Randall Garrett. It depicts the changes, after the events of The Shrouded Planet by the same authors, in the society of the fictional planet Nidor, a world perpetually covered in dense cloud, inhabited by humanoids resembling humans but differing in several respects, notably in being covered from head to foot in short downy fur. The technological level of the society is about that of Renaissance Europe, and has been that way for thousands of years.

In the novel the main characters are struggling to throw off the influence of the Earthmen. These are humans with advanced technology, who came to their planet as benefactors, founding a university and presiding over advances in agriculture, but whose work always seemed to have adverse results. Some of this was depicted in a previous set of shorter stories, collected as The Shrouded Planet two years previously.

== Genesis ==
This is described in detail in forewords by the authors. In the late 1950s the best paying American science fiction magazine was Astounding Science Fiction, edited by John W. Campbell. Campbell was a complex man and a tough editor to please, but he was very much in tune with the times and believed fervently in the triumph of American society and values, specifically those of a white middle class. He was not fond of other cultures or their values, to the point where Isaac Asimov, for one, regarded him as borderline anti-Semitic. However, he spent more of his energy pushing his own values than disparaging others.

Garrett and Silverberg set out to write the ultimate Campbell storyline – one featuring benevolent white men bringing civilization to the backward aliens, founding the Bel-rogas School of Divine Law. The motives of the humans are not fully explained until the end of the novel.

The protagonists of the stories are all Nidorians, specifically the Brajjyd line, beginning with Kiv, followed by his daughter Sindi, her husband Rahn and then their son Norvis, who is one of the protagonists of this novel. Nidorians are culturally homogeneous, although there are some less typical characters from the outlying Bronze Islands, home to miners of copper and zinc.

== Nidorian culture ==
Nidor is a world and, as far as the Nidorians know, a single continent. The rest of the planet is believed to be ocean. Tradition says that a geophysical disaster, the Great Cataclysm, wiped out all previous lands and peoples. The survivors were led to Nidor by Bel-rogas Yorgen, who gave them the Law and Scripture they have lived by for millennia. The culture is patriarchal with a caste system dominated by the High Priests of the Great Light, a form of sun worship, although, due to the perpetual cloud cover, the sun is never visible except as a bright area of the sky.

People belong to one of sixteen clans with intra-clan marriage forbidden, although the taboo is beginning to broken as the novel opens. Names consist of a given name, a patronymic and a clan name. The patronymic for a son is the prefix pe concatenated with the father's given name, while the prefix ge indicates a daughter. Wives add a spousal name consisting of the prefix i with their husband's given name.

At the bottom are the farmers of a single major crop, the peych bean, which supplies all food, textiles and other needs. Peych farming is highly ritualized, with set procedures for planting, dealing with pests, fertilizing with manure, and harvesting. The main pest is an insect called the hugl, which is fought using Edris powder, a plant-derived insecticide similar to permethrin. There are some domestic animals, including the horse-like deest.

== Back story ==
By the time the novel opens, radical changes have already occurred. A new kind of hugl almost wiped out the peych crop, but Kiv peGanz Brajjyd found a new way to use the Edris powder, almost wiping out the hugl. In doing so, he impoverished the manufacturers of Edris powder, causing a minor economic dislocation, not to mention a group of people with a grudge. He entered the priesthood, and is now the Leader of the Council of Elders, the supreme religious and legal authority. His daughter Sindi geKiv married another Brajjyd, breaking the ancient rule against in-clan marriage. Her husband's family was one of those who lost their livelihood making Edris powder. Kiv's grandson, Norvis peRahn Brajjyd, devised a new growth hormone for peych that doubled yields. The credit for the hormone was stolen from him, apparently by the Earthmen, and given to another student, while Norvis was disgraced and had to flee, changing his name to Norvis peKrin Dmorno. The luckless recipient of the Earthmen's largesse was lynched by a mob when the peych market collapsed, due to Norvis's giving the hormone to all the farmers secretly, causing a glut and an economic depression.

Norvis harbors a grudge against the Earthmen, and by extension, the High Priests who he sees as their lackeys. He joins with Del peFenn Vyless, a sea captain who took him on board when he was an outcast. They form the first political party on Nidor, the Merchants Party, dedicated to returning to the Way of the Ancestors. One member is a young firebrand, whose parents were killed in the peych riots. His name is Kris peKym Yorgen.

== Plot summary ==
As the novel opens, Kris peKym and his cronies are doing an unprecedented and revolutionary thing – they are robbing a bank. Although the Nidorians use paper money, it is always backed by reserves of precious metal, in this case cobalt. The gang removes all the cobalt from one of the regional banks, making its scrip worthless. The plan is to use their cash reserves from other banks to buy up the worthless notes at a steep discount, then let the cobalt be re-discovered, multiplying their funds overnight.

The scheme appears to succeed, but in the process Nidorian society becomes ever more fractured. Del peFenn Vyless, the radical leader of Norvis' party, is assassinated. His place is taken by Kris peKym who, as a Yorgen and direct descendant of the Lawgiver, is an ideal figurehead for the movement to restore the old ways.

Kris peKym spreads a rumor that the Earthmen are responsible for the theft of the cobalt, and when the Earthmen refuse to deny this rumor, he foments a riot that results in the sacking of the school. The cobalt is discovered there, where Kris had planted it. The Earthmen do nothing – they stand and watch the destruction, then float up into the sky, surrounded by a blue glow. As far as the Nidorians can tell, they have been driven off Nidor.

Things progressively get worse until mass starvation, food riots and breakdown of the law result in the destruction of the main Temple. Norvis confronts his grandfather, who collapses and dies as his world crumbles around him. Norvis' party appears to have won, but it is a Pyrrhic victory, with new religious sects appearing and more economic problems. Kris peKym is appointed executive officer by the remnants of the High Council, the first autocratic leader in the history of Nidor.

Norvis sets out on a quest – his mother had told him how she happened across an encampment of Earthmen in the mountains, and he wants to know if they are still there. He finds the camp, but it is abandoned. However, he has company – the Earthman he knows as Smith, who caused his downfall. Smith has been waiting for Norvis. Norvis pulls out a weapon to exact revenge, but holds off long enough for Smith to persuade Norvis to come with him to a place where all will be explained.

Rising together, just as the Earthmen did when the school was sacked, they enter a spaceship, which rises above the atmosphere. Norvis is shown what the Great Light really is, and how far away it is. He sees his planet from above, the first Nidorian to do so. Smith explains that when the Earthmen first encountered Nidor, it was the first time they had found a species they had anything in common with, albeit one that had no inkling of other worlds, because they never saw the sun or stars.

Intelligent life is rare, and previous encounters with aliens had been hostile and traumatic. Nidor promised humans something they thought they lacked – stimulating companionship and competition. However, Nidorian society was locked in stasis. It could never provide a challenge to humans, and any significant interactions would destroy it through culture shock. Instead the humans adopted the role of the beneficent Earthmen, with a distinctive appearance, for instance wearing beards, and created institutions like the School of Divine Law, which, over the years, would result in the disruption of the static society. They also created the conditions for intelligent, outward-looking Nidorians to meet and marry, thus breeding a new Nidorian who would lead the new society.

Norvis realizes that he is a result of that breeding program. Smith explains he was kicked out of the school because they knew what problems the peych hormone would cause. Indeed, the tactic proved so successful they have been kicking out other students of Norvis' calibre so they would be just as motivated as Norvis himself.

Smith returns Norvis to the surface of the planet, but not before telling him "see you in a couple of centuries". Humans and Nidorians will not meet again until Nidor lifts itself into space, as it must. When that happens, humans will not look like the hated Earthmen, and the two species will become friends.

Back on the surface, Norvis has an epiphany. He has been trying to get rid of the Earthmen for what they did to Nidor, but everything they did, even partly causing the peych glut, was minor. The person really responsible for ruining Nidor, by killing Del peFenn, by starting heretical religious sects, by creating the Merchants Party itself in opposition to the priests, is Norvis himself. The Earthmen did not need to ruin Nidor. They simply bred a Nidorian to do it for them. Now there is no going back.

Norvis returns to his own kind. He is shocked to find that Kris peKym has been assassinated while he was gone. He nominates a new leader, and prepares to do, behind the scene, what he must, starting with rebuilding the school.
