= The Best Policy =

Science fiction short story

The Best Policy is a science fiction short story by Randall Garrett (under the pseudonym "David Gordon") about honesty. It was first published in Astounding Science Fiction, in 1957.

== Plot ==
When the alien Dal kidnap scientist Edwin Magruder from the colony planet New Hawaii, they intend to interrogate him so that they may use the information he provides to conquer humanity. However, when Magruder realizes that the Dal "lie detector" instead detects objective truth, he uses obfuscation to convince his captors that humans possess supernatural abilities and are vastly more powerful than them.

== Reception ==
Kirkus Reviews considered it "sprightly". The Encyclopedia of Science Fiction noted that Magruder could be considered an "homage to Eric Frank Russell and his glib heroes."
