= But, I Don't Think =

1959 short story by Randall Garrett

But, I Don't Think is a science fiction short story (novelette) by prolific author Randall Garrett. It was first published in Astounding Science Fiction in July 1959 (published December 1959 in the UK, where it had a repainted cover). It asks the question, "Are a society's laws cruel if its inhabitants like them ?"

== Plot ==
A man called "The Guesser" is a Class Three member of a strict, hierarchical space-going society, that is fighting against another civilization they know only as "Misfits". The Guesser has a talent for knowing where an enemy ship will be before even the on-board computers, and aiming a weapon to destroy it. Class One Executives have many privileges but are called on to make hard decisions. Lower classes such as Five and Six do menial work. All Class members must show deference to members of a higher class, and expect it from lower classes. Punishment for transgressing takes the form of induced nerve pain in jolts over several minutes.

The Guesser is waylaid and left for dead during leave on a planet. Stripped of his uniform and insignia, he misses the departure of his ship. He is befriended by a low class woman who wants to escape to a Misfit planet. Because she is only a cleaner, she can do some things without being observed. She has stolen the uniform of an Executive and wants the Guesser to wear it and take a ship to bring them both to a Misfit planet. However the Guesser takes the uniform, abandons her, and uses it to catch up with his original ship. In the process he finds that the responsibilities of an Executive are far more than he wants to handle, or indeed is capable of handling.

Reunited with his ship, he is told that he was waylaid by his subordinate, who wanted his job, but has failed to perform properly and been stripped of all his ranks. For impersonating an Executive, the Guesser is sentenced to more pain punishment. However, he is glad to be back.
