= The Butterfly Kid =

1967 novel by Chester Anderson

- Cover of first edition (paperback)
- Author: Chester Anderson
- Cover artist: Gray Morrow
- Language: English
- Series: Greenwich Village Trilogy
- Genre: Science fiction novel
- Publisher: Pyramid Books
- Publication date: 1967
- Publication place: United States
- Media type: Print (Hardcover & Paperback)
- Pages: 190 pp
- OCLC: 4109267
- Followed by: The Unicorn Girl by Michael Kurland

The Butterfly Kid is a science fiction novel by Chester Anderson originally released in 1967. It was nominated for a Hugo Award for Best Novel in 1968. The novel is the first part of the Greenwich Village Trilogy, with Michael Kurland writing the second book (The Unicorn Girl) and the third volume (The Probability Pad) written by T.A. Waters.

== Plot introduction ==
The novel is primarily set in Greenwich Village, and is thoroughly saturated with psychedelic and 1960s counterculture elements. The time is an undefined near future, indicated by SF elements such as video phones and personal hovercraft; the Bicentennial is also mentioned. The use of psychoactive drugs and their effects are a central element of the story; much of the action revolves around an alien-introduced drug (referred to as "Reality Pills") that cause LSD-like hallucinations to manifest physically, generally causing chaos. The book's protagonist shares a name with the author, and another character shares the name of Michael Kurland, a friend and roommate of the author's at that time.

The book's title refers to a character, Sean, who is able to spontaneously produce butterflies of all shapes, sizes, and colors after taking a "Reality Pill." Although Sean is introduced very early in the story, he is not the novel's central character.

== Literary significance & criticism ==
The book's counterculture subject matter and lighthearted tone have led to it being associated with the New Wave movement in science fiction. Although some reviews state that the novel is "written with wit and elegance," and "an engaging expression of countercultural exuberance," another says it was "already dated" as of 1984.

== Release details ==
- First edition published by Pyramid Books, 1967, 190 pp
- First hardcover edition published by Gregg Press, 1977, ISBN 0-8398-2374-6
- Paperback re-release published by Pocket Books, 1980, 204 pp, ISBN 0-671-83296-4
- Paperback reissue by published by Dover Publications, 2019, 208 pp., ISBN 9780486836676
