= The Shrouded Planet =

1957 novel by Robert Silverberg

- Dust-jacket of the first edition
- Author: Robert Randall (pseudonym of Robert Silverberg and Randall Garrett)
- Cover artist: Wallace Wood
- Language: English
- Genre: Science fiction
- Publisher: Gnome Press
- Publication date: 1957
- Publication place: United States
- Media type: Print (hardcover)
- Pages: 186
- Followed by: The Dawning Light

The Shrouded Planet is a 1957 science fiction novel published under the name "Robert Randall", a collaborative work of American writers Robert Silverberg and Randall Garrett. It consists of three linked stories, each originally published separately in the magazine Astounding Science Fiction. Linking chapters were added for book release. The first book printing, by Gnome Press in New York, was small and did not sell well. This and the sequel novel, The Dawning Light, were reprinted 25 years later.

The original stories were:

- "The Chosen People" (Astounding SF, June 1956)
- "The Promised Land" (Astounding SF, August 1956)
- "False Prophet" (Astounding SF, December 1956; also front cover art)

All the stories relate to the fictional planet Nidor and the effects on its humanoid inhabitants of the coming Earthmen, who are humans with advanced technology and apparently benevolent motives. The common thread is a family, beginning with Kiv peGanz Brajjyd, his daughter Sindi, and her son Norvis. Each contributes to the slow breakdown of Nidorian society, which is apparently what the Earthmen really want.

== Plot summary ==
The original three stories are bracketed by narrative which lays the foundations for them and details the passage of time between them.

=== Introduction ===
Elder Grandfather Kinis peCharnok Yorgen finds himself the subject of alien abduction. Strange beings calling themselves "Earthmen" conduct him to a place above the clouds. They tell him that they have come from the Great Light to improve Nidor. Kinis peCharnok must commence building a new School of Divine Law, where the Earthmen will teach Nidorians the Law and the Scripture, not to mention science and engineering. Only the best and brightest, the fittest and most favored, will be accepted as students.

=== Kiv (The Chosen People) ===
48 years, 3 Cycles of Nidor, pass. Kiv peGanz Brajjyd enrols at the school, on his way to the priesthood. He marries the irreverent Narla geFulda Sesom. He studies biology, especially the insect pest known as the hugl. Then, a new hugl begins appearing, stripping the crops, stripping even dead animals of their flesh. The old Way of dealing with hugl, spreading Edris powder, does not work on these insects. Kiv has the answer - he knows that the hugl breed in ponds. They leave the water to gather food for the next breeding cycle, but out of the water their hard shells resist Edris powder. In water, the pest larvae are vulnerable.

Kiv tries to persuade the authorities, who are also the priesthood, to dictate a new way of using Edris, but he is up against millennia of tradition. The old Way indicates that more Edris must be used, but if it does not work there will be none to protect crops that the new hugl have not yet reached. In the end, more Edris only poisons the crops.

Desperate for a solution, and with the encouragement of the Earthman known as Jones, Kiv looks for support in Scripture, and finds it. "Strike at the root, not at the branch". The larvae is considered the root. Having once failed to persuade a single Elder, Kiv bursts in on the entire High Council with his words. The ploy works, the new Way wipes out the hugl. But tradition has been violated. There is little or no need for Edris powder, so those who made a livelihood from it are impoverished. Kiv is a man to be reckoned with, and when he graduates his path to the Council seems clear. So why does he feel something is wrong?

=== Sindi (The Promised Land) ===
Kiv and Narla's daughter, Sindi geKiv Brajjyd, has an odd independent streak. She does not show proper deference to her elders. She too enrolls at the School, where she meets Rahn peDorvis Brajjyd. She falls in love with him, even though marriage within a clan goes against tradition and the Way of the Ancestors. Rahn's family lost its livelihood thanks to Kiv.

Kiv, now high in the priesthood, tries to arrange a marriage with a member of the Yorgen clan. He is uneducated, fond of wild living, and not particularly enthusiastic about Sindi. She realizes that he is interested in someone else, a Yorgen. This relative may in fact be carrying his child, which would get them both stoned to death in an earlier time.

Depressed, Rahn flees the School, pursued by Sindi. High in the mountains, in the night rains, she finds his transport, a deest, but no sign of Rahn. Then she sees him, a captive of Earthmen, on a patch of strangely flat ground with odd buildings on it. Watching from concealment, she sees the Earthman Jones, who supposedly had gone to the Great Light, never to return, take Rahn inside a building. Rahn then appears, being carried through the air by the Earthmen, who leave him by his deest. Sindi tends to Rahn, finding that he remembers nothing of his encounter with the Earthmen.

They return to the School, to find that Jones' replacement, Smith, has persuaded the Elders to allow the Yorgens to marry, because of the girl's condition, clearing the way for Sindi and Rahn to marry as well. Sindi resolves to keep her secrets to herself, until it is the right time.

=== Norvis (False Prophet) ===
Norvis peRahn Brajjyd grows up and enrols in the School, as his parents and grandparents did before him. Advised by the Earthman Smith, he finds a growth hormone that doubles the yield of the staple crop, the peych-bean. Suddenly he finds himself expelled, the credit for the hormone going to a blockhead, Dran peNiblo Sesom, apparently with the connivance of Smith.

Cast out by his grandfather Kiv, with no source of income, unable to speak his own name, he signs on as a sailor using the name Norvis peKrin Dmorno. His natural abilities mean that he quickly becomes indispensable, being promoted to first mate under the Captain Del peFenn Vyless, with the promise of his own ship, if he re-enlists. Del peFenn is even more irreligious than most sailors. His father used to make a lot of money from Edris powder shipments, before the Elder Kiv peGanz Brajjyd eliminated the need for it. All too aware of what Del peFenn would think of Kiv's grandson, Norvis declines. He goes ashore to find that some of the Elders have been using his hormone to favor their own farms at the expense of others. He organizes a meeting, under his real name, to address impoverished farmers. However, in attacking the Elders he is accused of blasphemy and stoned, barely escaping with his life by swimming a lake. His assailants assume he has drowned. Norvis abandons his old identity as too dangerous.

Returning to Del peFenn, he formulates a plan. He will make hormone more cheaply than the Elders can and sell it to the farmers. The plan backfires when a glut of peych starts an economic depression. In the ensuing troubles, Del's ship is burned and some of his men are killed. The hapless Dran peNiblo Sesom, who had grown rich making and selling the hormone under the protection of the Elders, is lynched by a mob.

Norvis is not finished. He and Del now take on the Elders to stop the use of the hormone and persuade farmers to plough the excess crop into the ground, as fertilizer. To do this, they form the Merchant's Party, the first political party on Nidor. Through agitation and occasional strongarm tactics, they force the Elders to follow their plan, ignoring tradition.

At the end, Norvis is the Secretary of the new party. Del is its charismatic, anti-priesthood leader. Nidorians who have suffered in the troubles flock to them. They have become a new authority on Nidor. Norvis sees a new dawn, and a way to get rid of the Earthmen and all their works. Starting with Smith ...

The saga continues in The Dawning Light.

== Reception ==
Damon Knight wryly dismissed the novel as badly plotted, saying that the planetary ecology "seems to be made up entirely of peych beans, hugl bugs, and simpletons." Galaxy columnist Floyd C. Gale notes that "SF is full of stories of the uplifting of backward cultures by the Good Earth, but few depict her as the sponsor of a heartless program that replaces happiness with its pursuit."

The story has been mentioned as an example of "juvenile escapism" of the 1920s morphing into "thoughtful social science fiction" in early American sci-fi.

== Sources ==
- Chalker, Jack L.; Mark Owings (1998). The Science-Fantasy Publishers: A Bibliographic History, 1923-1998. Westminster, Maryland and Baltimore: Mirage Press, Ltd. p. 305.
