= Baron Darcy =

Baron Darcy may refer to the following baronies:

- Baron Darcy of Nocton, created 1299, abeyant circa 1350
- Baron Darcy de Knayth, created 1332, presently extant
- Baron Darcy de Darcy (also known as Baron Darcy of Temple Hurst), created 1509, extinct in 1635
- Baron Darcy of Chiche, created 1551, extinct in 1640; reversion granted 1613, extinct in 1737
- Baron Darcy de Meinill, created 1641, extinct in 1778
- Baron Darcy of Navan in the Peerage of Ireland, created 1721, extinct in 1733

== See also ==
- Lord Darcy (disambiguation)
