= Wilhelm Kühne =

German physiologist (1837–1900)

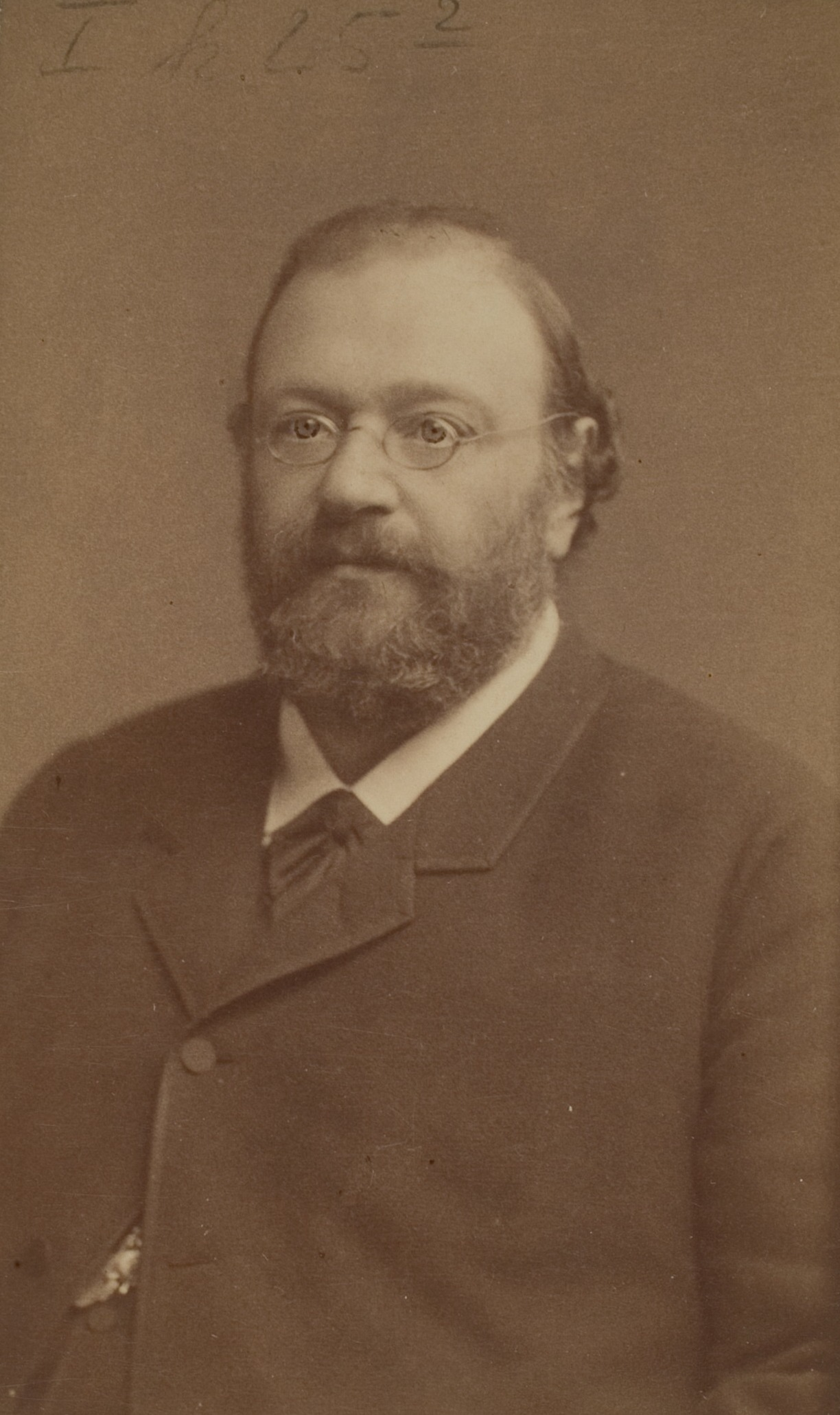
- Born: 28 March 1837; Free City of Hamburg
- Died: 10 June 1900 (aged 63); Heidelberg, German Empire
- Other name: Father of organic chemistry
- Education: University of Göttingen
- Known for: Coining the word "enzyme" Discovery of myosin Discovery of trypsin Optography
- Awards: ForMemRS (1892)
- Scientific career
- Fields: Physiology, physiological chemistry
- Workplaces: University of Berlin; University of Amsterdam; University of Heidelberg
- Doctoral advisor: Rudolph Wagner
- Other academic advisors: Friedrich Wöhler
- Doctoral students: Russell Chittenden

Wilhelm Friedrich Kühne (28 March 1837 – 10 June 1900) was a German physiologist. He coined the word enzyme in 1878.

== Biography ==
Kühne was born at Hamburg on 28 March 1837. After attending the gymnasium in Lüneburg, he went to Göttingen, where his master in chemistry was Friedrich Wöhler and in physiology Rudolph Wagner. Having graduated in 1856, he studied under various famous physiologists, including Emil du Bois-Reymond at Berlin, Claude Bernard in Paris, and KFW Ludwig and EW von Brücke in Vienna.

At the end of 1863 he was put in charge of the chemical department of the pathological laboratory at Berlin, under Rudolf Virchow; in 1868 he was appointed professor of physiology at Amsterdam; and in 1871 he was chosen to succeed Hermann von Helmholtz in the same capacity at Heidelberg, where he died on 10 June 1900.

== Works ==
Kühne's original work falls into two main groups, the physiology of muscle, and nerve, which occupied the earlier years of his life. In 1864 Kühne extracted a viscous protein from skeletal muscle that he held responsible for keeping the tension state in muscle. He called this protein myosin. He began to investigate the chemistry of digestion while at Berlin with Virchow. In 1876, he discovered the protein-digesting enzyme trypsin.

He was also known for his research on vision and the chemical changes occurring in the retina under the influence of light. Using the "visual purple" (or rhodopsin), described by Franz Christian Boll in 1876, he attempted to make the basis of a photochemical theory of vision, but though he was able to establish its importance in connection with vision in light of low intensity, its absence from the retinal area of most distinct vision detracted from the completeness of the theory and precluded its general acceptance. Kühne also pioneered the process of optography, the generation of an image from the retina of a rabbit by applying a chemical process to fix the state of the rhodopsin in the eye. Later, Kühne attempted his technique on the eye of a convicted murderer from Bruchsal, Germany with inconclusive results.

He was elected member of the Royal Swedish Academy of Sciences in 1898.

== Students ==
José Rizal (1861–1896), martyr and national hero of the Philippines, learned physiology under Kühne at the Heidelberg University in 1886.

Ida Henrietta Hyde (1857–1945) wanted to study physiology under Kühne at the University of Heidelberg on the recommendation of Professor Alexander Goette at Strasbourg. The university accepted her, but Willhelm Kühne refused to allow her in lectures and laboratories. He is reported to have said that he would never allow "skirts" in his classes. However, when a colleague asked him whether, if at the end of the course she could pass the examination, he would grant her the degree, he jokingly replied that he would. And so for six semesters, she had to study physiology independent of the classroom and of hands-on laboratory projects, using only his assistants' notes and lab sketches. Finally, a four-hour oral examination by Kühne's academic committee, proved her worthiness. The "summa cum laude" degree, the highest honors, could not go to a woman, so Kühne invented a new phrase: "Multa Cum Laude Superavit" in English meaning "she overcame with much praise."

Hyde completed the PhD at Heidelberg in 1896, the first woman to receive one for this type of work. Kühne recommended her for a position at the Heidelberg-supported research program at the Naples Marine Biological Laboratory in Naples Italy, where she studied the nature and function of salivary glands. She was a life member of this organization, and its secretary from 1897 to 1900.
