= Fritz Angerstein =

German mass murderer (1891–1925)

- Born: Fritz Heinrich Angerstein; January 3, 1891; Dillenburg, German Empire
- Died: November 17, 1925 (aged 34); Central Prison Freiendiez, Diez an der Lahn, Weimar Republic
- Cause of death: Execution by beheading
- Status: Executed
- Conviction: Murder (8 counts)
- Penalty: Death

Details
- Date: December 1, 1924
- Locations: Haiger, Germany
- Killed: 8
- Weapons: Hunting dagger Hand-axe

Fritz Heinrich Angerstein (January 3, 1891 – November 17, 1925) was a German mass murderer who killed eight people at his home in Haiger, on December 1, 1924. The subject of a media spectacle, Angerstein was sentenced to death eight times, and was executed in 1925.

== Biography ==
Fritz Heinrich Angerstein was born on January 3, 1891, in Dillenburg, German Reich, the seventh of ten children. His father, who worked as a carpenter and later as a steelworker, was also the mayor of Dillenburg. Angerstein suffered from health problems during his childhood, including regular tuberculosis infections and having a rib surgically removed, but at age 14 began working as a surveyor, before being employed by the Nassauische Bergbau AG. In 1917, he became procurator of a limestone mine in Haiger, which was taken over by the firm van der Zypen in 1920.

In 1911, Angerstein married Käthe Barth, a devout Methodist, and the marriage was described as happy, with Angerstein giving the impression of a loving and caring husband. Despite this, Käthe was afflicted with severe hysteria and also fell ill with an unknown intestinal disease in 1920. His wife's illnesses mentally and physically exhausted Angerstein, who himself almost constantly suffered from various types of tuberculosis. The couple had no children, though Käthe had miscarried six times. The relationship with his mother-in-law was said to have been strained because they were unable to have any children and because of her poor treatment of his wife. Angerstein related that his mother-in-law often reduced Käthe's diet to soup, due to her ailments, though apparently she often burnt the meal, whereupon his wife would not eat anything at all. According to his own testimony, Angerstein once whipped his mother-in-law with a dog whip out of anger, because Käthe had run away from home due to another burnt meal. In the same instance, Angerstein also had decided to shoot his mother-in-law and himself should his wife not return home.

In 1921, Käthe wrote a letter to her husband, telling him that due to her illnesses she could not be the wife he needed. After Angerstein had talked to her about the matter, they made the mutual decision to drown themselves, since they were both regularly sick at that time. However, when Angerstein was carrying his wife half-way into the water, they heard someone singing a song, which according to Angerstein brought them to their senses again, and they aborted their suicide attempt. The same year, Angerstein, together with his wife, mother-in-law and sister-in-law, moved to Haiger after he received free lodging in a villa belonging to his employer, van der Zypen. The ground floor consisted of five bureaus for Angerstein and his assistants, first floor living quarters for himself and his wife, his sister-in-law and mother-in-law, and the attic for their maidservant. His salary was 390 ℛℳ (Reichsmark) per month, although Angerstein claimed van der Zypen owed him 90,000 ℛℳ. Angerstein got into financial troubles, whereupon he began to embezzle money from his employer, which, according to court records, the total sum was 14,892 ℛℳ. The fraud was discovered by one of Angerstein's colleagues in November 1924. On the Friday before the murders, Angerstein witnessed his wife put away a notebook containing her last wishes, stating she was expecting to die soon. Angerstein, on the night of November 30 and December 1, found and read the notebook.

On the Saturday before the murders, Angerstein met with his manager named Nix for wage accounting and paid salaries, where Nix confronted him with the discrepancies in the accounting. Startled by six shots during the night in front of the house, his wife began suffering from bloody diarrhea, vomiting, fainting and heart problems due to the agitation. Angerstein learned the next day that the shots had been fired during a birthday party, and he began to suffer from severe headaches.

== Murders ==
The villa where the murders took place.

On the night of November 30 to December 1, 1924, Angerstein had damaged a telephone wire and some water pipes. Between 12 and 1 a.m., Angerstein awoke as his wife suffered from severe heart pain. He wanted to call a doctor, but his wife held him back, instead fetching his mother-in-law. After she returned to her bed, Angerstein sat beside his wife, who was lying in bed, where she read him a letter. Angerstein then changed the pillow case, stained by his wife's vomiting. He overheard his wife and mother-in-law talking about another letter written by his brother-in-law, stating that he had syphilis, and that the disease could spread to other family members, agitating him. He then talked with his wife about the letter, and remembered his wife once telling him that she wanted to die the same hour he died. Angerstein then decided to kill his wife and himself, and when his wife fainted, Angerstein fetched his revolver from another room. When he returned to the room, his wife was awake, and she grabbed his hand and took his revolver from him, saying "His own wife, Lord forgive him!" before fainting again. Angerstein then fetched his hunting dagger and fatally stabbed his wife 18 times with it. He then ran downstairs to his study and attempted to shoot himself, but both revolvers failed to fire. He then ran down to the cellar, looking for something with which to kill himself. Finding a hand-axe, he intended to cut off his own hand, but hearing his mother-in-law scream, he ran back upstairs and killed her because, as he later claimed, he was angry about her having treated his sick wife badly.

Angerstein realized that their maidservant, Minna Stoll, was standing in front of him. She ran away and up the stairs to the attic, but just before she reached the door to the attic, Angerstein caught up with her, grabbed her from behind and hit her over the head with the hand-axe, whereupon she collapsed. Angerstein later stated that he killed her because she burned meals, was unclean, and because he and his wife were generally displeased with her. Her body was later found burnt on the first floor. Angerstein then returned to his bedroom and again hacked at the bodies of his mother-in-law and wife, fearing they might get up again. His mother-in-law was still moaning, but Angerstein returned to the kitchen, washed the axe and his hands, sat down and slept for a few hours. When his 18-year-old sister-in-law Ella Barth returned during the night from a train journey, she went upstairs and into the bathroom. Angerstein followed her and killed her with the axe, then covered her up because he could not stand to look at her corpse.

At approximately 7 a.m. on Monday, a bookkeeper, Ditthart, and a clerk, Kiel, arrived at the villa to work. One after the other, Angerstein called them into his study, locked the door, and killed them with the axe. During the course of the day, he also killed the son of the villa gardener, Geist, and another laborer working for him, Darr, with a hatchet, fearing that they both might have seen the dead bodies. Angerstein's German Shepherd was later found in the locked cellar with its head smashed in. A man named Ebert arrived and Angerstein handed him a letter for his brother, before sending him away. Responding to questions about his dishevelled state, Angerstein answered that he was sick.

Afterwards, Angerstein poured out petrol (maybe brought with a truck later found a few kilometres outside of the town) in his study on the ground floor and the rooms on the first floor. He then went shopping in the city, buying two chocolate bars, according to himself for his "dear wife", and a flashlight. After sunset, Angerstein went back home and set the petrol alight, though the ground floor did not catch fire. He then stabbed himself several times, causing severe but not life-threatening wounds, then called for help. When help arrived, Angerstein claimed he had been attacked by bandits, who had killed everyone in the house and left him for dead. Angerstein told his helpers and the police that he was assaulted in his villa after he returned from town, and some people claimed to have seen 15 to 25 bandits. Angerstein was taken to the hospital in Haiger, where he was operated on, while panic over the imaginary bandits spread across Haiger, and extra policemen were sent for from Siegen and Wetzlar for protection, and militias were formed.

Georg Popp helped in the investigation of the murders, and the investigators raised doubts about Angerstein's story. The corpses had rigor mortis already set in, thus contradicting Angerstein's claims regarding when the killings had taken place. Angerstein's fingerprints were found on the dagger and on the dead bodies, and there were no signs of a robbery having taken place. During interrogation by the prosecutor, Angerstein denied having committed the killings himself, but often made contradictory statements regarding the deaths. Angerstein was arrested, though he remained in hospital. After the autopsies, he was accused of having committed the murders, and Angerstein finally confessed to his brother in the presence of a police officer.

=== Victims ===
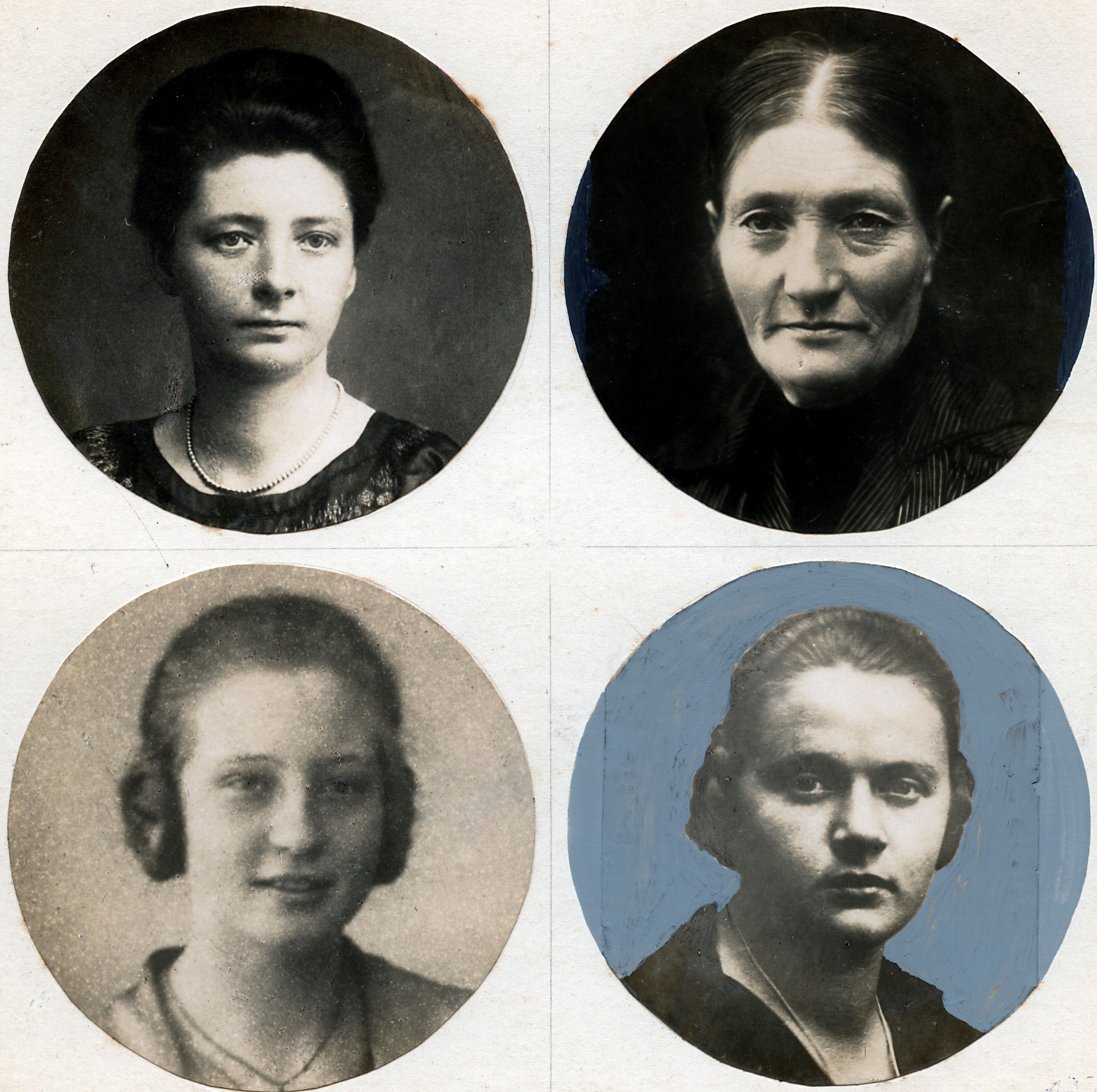
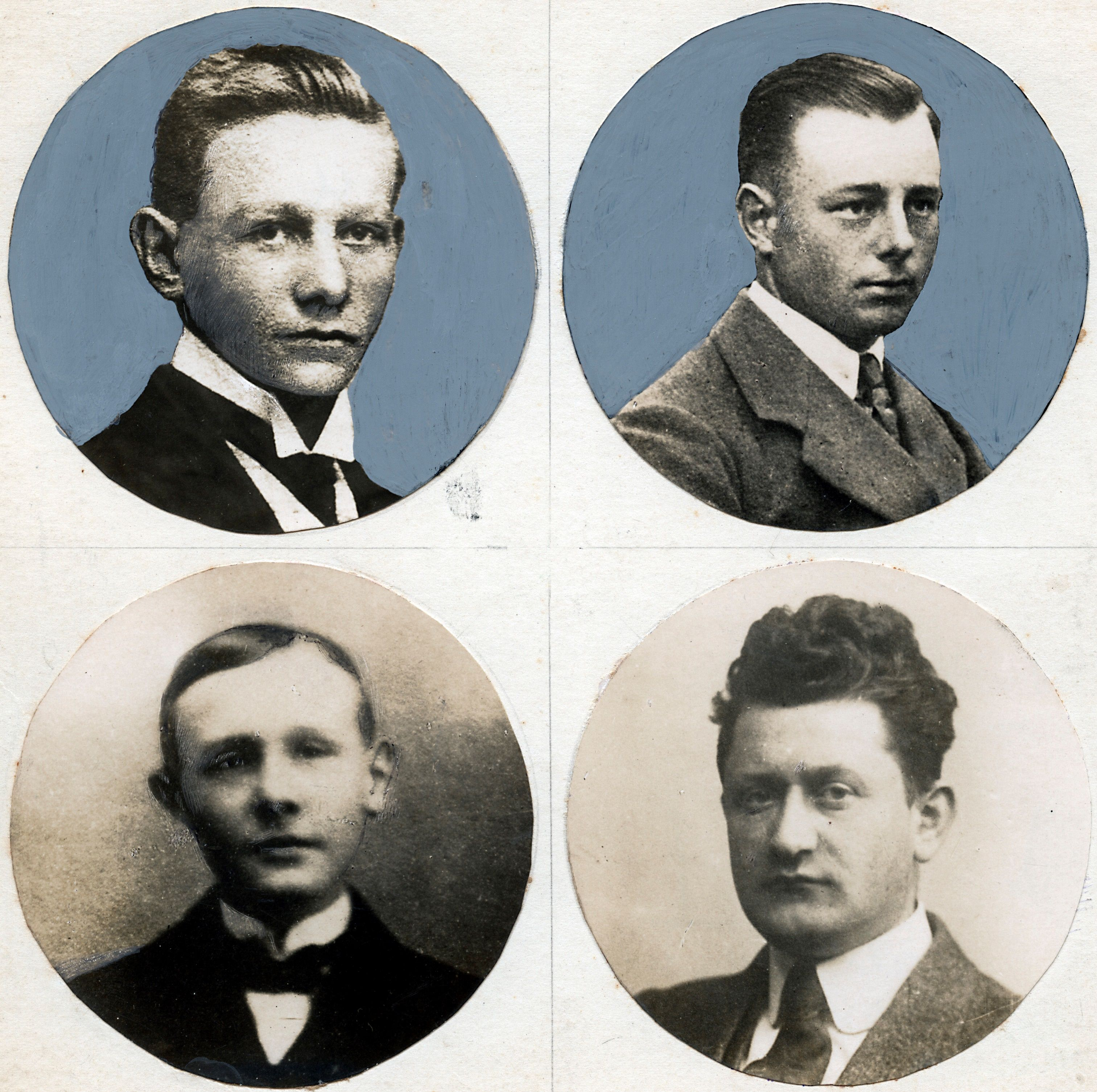

- Käthe Angerstein, née Barth, Angerstein's wife
- Katharina Barth, Angerstein's mother-in-law
- Minna Stoll, Angerstein's maidservant
- Ella Barth, 18, Angerstein's sister-in-law
- Reinhold Diethardt, bookkeeper
- Heinrich Kiehl, clerk
- Alex Geiß, Angerstein's gardener
- Rudi Darr, gardener's assistant

== Conviction and execution ==
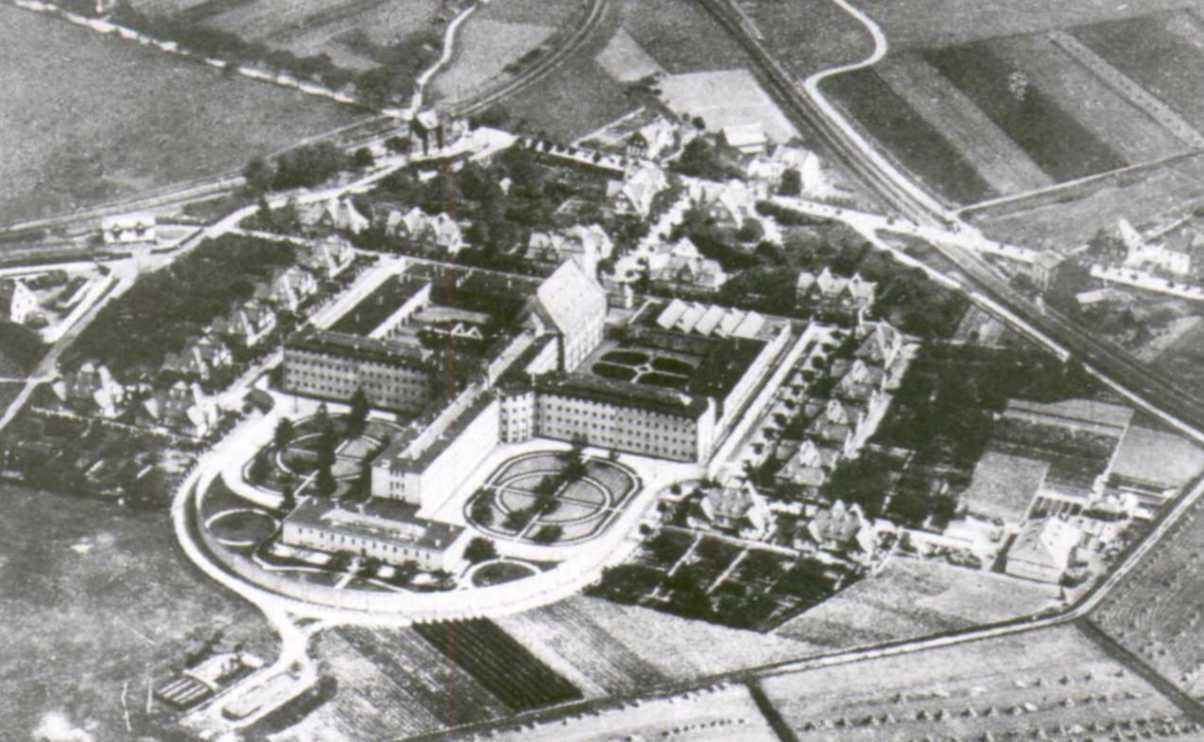
Central Prison Freiendiez in Diez, where Angerstein was executed

Out of fear that the public could turn against Angerstein, he was taken to Limburg an der Lahn only two weeks before the trial started in July 1925. The trial was a media spectacle, garnering much publicity and coverage, and together with the trials of serial killers Fritz Haarmann and Peter Kürten, was considered one of the great mass murderer trials of the Weimar Republic. Angerstein was charged with 13 crimes, among them eight counts of murder, two counts of embezzlement, and one count each of forging documents, arson, and perjury. Angerstein claimed he did not embezzle money, but that van der Zypen had owed him money. A total of 153 witnesses and 27 experts were called. Angerstein admitted to committing bribery and later to embezzlement.

On July 13, after six days of trial, Angerstein was sentenced to death eight times, once for each of the eight murders, and deprived of his civil rights for the rest of his life, while the other charges against him were dismissed. Angerstein accepted the verdict, stating that he did not want mercy and that his deed could only be atoned for with his blood.

On November 17, 1925, at 8 a.m., Angerstein was executed by decapitation with an axe by executioner Carl Gröpler in the courtyard of the Central Prison Freiendiez in Diez an der Lahn.

== Aftermath ==
=== Possible motives ===
There was much speculation surrounding the motive behind the murders. It was assumed that Angerstein had been gripped by paranoia due to his embezzlement, and that he was attempting to get rid of witnesses. Reference to this was made in this context to Angerstein's suicide attempt. Rumours circulated to the effect that Angerstein was inspired by the Sixth and Seventh Books of Moses, which state that by killing nine people a seal may be activated that provides great riches.

=== Optogram ===
The case has gained some notoriety for allegedly being one of the rare instances in which an optogram, a photograph taken from a dead person's retina, played a role in identifying and convicting a murderer. According to reports, one Professor Doehne of Cologne University photographed the retinas of two of Angerstein's victims, yielding one picture showing Angerstein's face, and a second one of Angerstein attacking his gardener with a hatchet. Substantial doubts have been raised about these claims though.

== Bibliography ==
- Bender, Julie: Angerstein?; in Zeitschrift für Sexualwissenschaft, 12, 1925.
- Kracauer, Siegfried: Tat ohne Täter - Zum Fall Angerstein; in Schriften 5.1: p. 318-322.
- Langensscheidt, Paul: Encyklopädie der modernen Kriminalistik, . pp. 417–420
- Popp, G.: Der Fall Angerstein I. Kriminalistische Betrachtungen zur Mordsache Angerstein, in: Deutsche Juristen-Zeitung 1925, Heft 16, pp. 1225–1229.
- Schlesinger, Paul: Richter und Gerichtete - Gerichtsreportagen aus den zwanziger Jahren; Munich, 1977. p. 103-106.

== External links English ==
- Lethen, Helmut: The Case of Angerstein, in Cool Conduct: The Culture of Distance in Weimar Germany, trans. Don Reneau; University of California Press, Berkeley/Los Angeles/London 2002.
- Band of Murderers Slays 8 in German Villa, Including Four Women, and Burn the House, The New York Times (December 3, 1924).
- Angerstein admits killing 8 in villa, The New York Times (December 4, 1924).
- Report man's image in dead victim's eye, The New York Times (December 8, 1924).
- Tells how he killed eight, The New York Times (July 7, 1925).
- Slayer of 8 sentenced, The New York Times (July 14, 1925).
- Slayer of 8 is executed, The New York Times (November 18, 1925).
- Bandits invade German village, Berkeley Daily Gazette (December 2, 1924).
- German confesses murders of eight, The Border Cities Star (December 3, 1924).
- Admits murder of 8, his wife among victims, The Morning Leader (December 4, 1924).
- A ghastly crime, The Age (December 4, 1924).
- Finger-prints trap murderer, Cape Girardeau Southeast Missourian (December 4, 1924).
- Man confesses murdering 8 members of his household, Reading Eagle (December 4, 1924).
- German paralytic admits he killed eight in family, St. Petersburg Times (December 5, 1924).
- German tells how he put 8 to death, Portsmouth Daily Times (July 7, 1925).
- Gives Details of his Crimes, The Calgary Daily Herald (July 7, 1925).
- Berlin Slayer goes on trial, The Crawfordsville Review (July 7, 1925).
- German Admits Slaying Eight Of Household, The Atlanta Constitution (December 4, 1924).
- SLAIN MAN'S EYE SHOWS PICTURE OF MURDERER, Chicago Daily Tribune (December 8, 1924).
- Photos Show Killer's Face In Retina, Says Savant, The Baltimore Sun (December 8, 1924).
- 8 Sentences To Die Given Berlin Slayer, The Atlanta Constitution (July 14, 1925).

== External links German ==
- , Die neue Zeitung (December 3, 1924).
- , Die neue Zeitung (December 4, 1924).
- , Freiburger Zeitung (December 3, 1924).
- , Freiburger Zeitung (December 4, 1924).
- , Coburger Zeitung (December 3, 1924).
- , Coburger Zeitung (December 4, 1924).
- , Coburger Zeitung (July 7, 1925).
- , Coburger Zeitung (July 8, 1925).
- , Coburger Zeitung (July 9, 1925).
- , Coburger Zeitung (July 10, 1925).
- , Coburger Zeitung (July 11, 1925).
- , Coburger Zeitung (July 13, 1925).
- , Flörsheimer Zeitung (December 3, 1924).
- , Flörsheimer Zeitung (July 8, 1925).
- , Flörsheimer Zeitung (July 11, 1925).
- , Flörsheimer Zeitung (July 15, 1925).
- , Hochheimer Stadtanzeiger (December 5, 1924).
- , Hochheimer Stadtanzeiger (July 14, 1925).
- , Hochheimer Stadtanzeiger (July 10, 1925).
- , Hochheimer Stadtanzeiger (July 7, 1925).
- Das Märchen von der Räuberbande, Vossische Zeitung (July 7, 1925) (Abend-Ausgabe).
- Massenmörder Angerstein im Kreuzverhör, Vossische Zeitung (July 7, 1925) (Morgen-Ausgabe).
- Angersteins doppeltes Gesicht, Vossische Zeitung (July 8, 1925) (Abend-Ausgabe).
- Der Mörder und seine Schuld, Vossische Zeitung (July 8, 1925) (Morgen-Ausgabe).
- Gericht über den Massenmörder, Vossische Zeitung (July 6, 1925) (Abend-Ausgabe).
- "Alle die meiner Frau Böses getan...", Vossische Zeitung (July 9, 1925) (Abend-Ausgabe).
- Frau Angersteins Ahnungen, Vossische Zeitung (July 9, 1925) (Morgen-Ausgabe).
- Angersteins Familienleben, Vossische Zeitung (July 10, 1925) (Abend-Ausgabe).
- Der Mörder und die Ärzte, Vossische Zeitung (July 11, 1925) (Morgen-Ausgabe).
- Angerstein zum Tode verurteilt, Vossische Zeitung (July 14, 1925) (Morgen-Ausgabe).
- Todesstrafe für Angerstein beantragt, Vossische Zeitung (July 13, 1925) (Abend-Ausgabe).
- Angerstein als Mörder seiner Familie verhaftet, Vossische Zeitung (December 3, 1924) (Abend-Ausgabe).
- Angerstein geständig, Vossische Zeitung (December 4, 1924) (Morgen-Ausgabe).
- Wie Angerstein seine Familie erschlug, Vossische Zeitung (December 4, 1924) (Abend-Ausgabe).
- Der achtfache Mord, Vossische Zeitung (December 3, 1924) (Morgen-Ausgabe).
- Acht Personen ermordet, Vossische Zeitung (December 2, 1924) (Abend-Ausgabe).
