= Laurence Janifer =

American novelist

- Born: Laurence Mark Harris; March 17, 1933; New York City, U.S.
- Died: July 10, 2002 (aged 69)

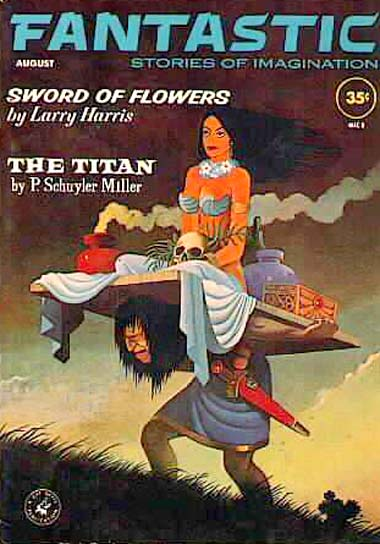
Janifer's novelette "Sword of Flowers" was the cover story on the August 1962 issue of Fantastic

Laurence Mark Janifer (born Laurence Mark Harris; March 17, 1933 – July 10, 2002) was an American science fiction author, with a career spanning over 50 years.

== Biography ==
Janifer was born in Brooklyn, New York with the surname of Harris, but in 1963 took the original surname of his Polish grandfather. Many of his early stories appeared under the "Larry M. Harris" byline.

Though his first published work was a short story in Cosmos magazine in 1953, his career as a writer can be said to have started in 1959 when he began writing for Astounding and Galaxy Science Fiction. He co-wrote the first novel in the "Psi-Power" series: Brain Twister, written with Randall Garrett under the joint pseudonym Mark Phillips. The novel was nominated for the Hugo Award for Best Novel in 1960, and published in book form in 1962. Janifer's best known work is the "Survivor" series, comprising five novels and many short stories. The series follows the career of Gerald Knave as he visits (and survives to tell the tale of) planets on the outskirts of the civilized galaxy.

In addition to his career as a novelist and short story author, Janifer was an editor for Scott Meredith Literary Agency; editor/managing editor of various detective and science fiction publications; film reviewer for several magazines; and a talented pianist.

Janifer died in hospital on 10 July 2002 following admission for congestive heart failure.

== Selected bibliography ==
=== As Laurence Janifer ===
- Slave Planet, Pyramid Publications, 1963.
- The Wonder War, Pyramid Publications, 1964.
- You Sane Men, Lancer Books, 1964, reprinted as Bloodworld, 1969.
- The Woman without a Name, Signet, 1966.
- (Editor) Masters' Choice: The Best Science-Fiction Stories of All Time Chosen by the Masters of Science-Fiction, Simon & Schuster, 1966.
- The Final Fear, Belmont Books, 1967.
- A Piece of Martin Cann, Belmont Books, 1968.
- Impossible?, Belmont Books, 1968.
- Target: Terra (With S. J. Treibich), Ace Books, 1968.
- The High Hex (With S. J. Treibich), Ace Books, 1969.
- The Wagered World (With S. J. Treibich), Ace Books, 1969.
- You Can't Escape, Lancer Books, 1969.
- Power, Dell, 1975.
- Survivor, Ace Books, 1977.
- Knave in Hand, Ace Books, 1979.
- Reel, Doubleday, 1983.
- Knave and the Game: A Collection of Short Stories, Doubleday, 1987.
- The Counterfeit Heinlein, Wildside Press, 2001.
- Alienist, Wildside Press, 2001.
- Two, Borgo Press, 2003.

=== as Larry M. Harris ===
- The Pickled Poodles, Random House, 1959.
- Pagan Passions (With Randall Garrett), Beacon-Galaxy, Galaxy novel No. 34, 1960.
- The Protector, Random House, 1960.

=== as Alfred Blake ===
- The Bed and I!, Intimate Books, 1962.
- Faithful for Eight Hours, Beacon Press, 1963.

=== as Andrew Blake ===
- I Deal in Desire, Boudoir, 1962.
- Sex Swinger, Beacon Press, 1963.
- Love Hostess, Beacon Press, 1963.

=== as Barbara Wilson ===
- The Pleasures We Know, Lancer Books, 1964.
- The Velvet Embrace, Lancer Books, 1965.

=== as Mark Phillips (joint pseudonym with Randall Garrett) ===
- Brain Twister, Pyramid Publications, (1962).
- The Impossibles, Pyramid Publications, 1963, 2nd edition, 1966.
- Supermind, Pyramid Publications, (1963).

=== Ghost Writer ===
- Ken Murray's Giant Joke Book, Ace Books, 1957.
- The Henry Morgan Joke Book, Avon, 1958.
- Jeff Harris, The Foot in My Mouth, Caravan Book, 1958.
