= The Same Old Story =

- Fringe episode
- Episode no.: Season 1 Episode 2
- Directed by: Paul A. Edwards
- Written by: Jeff Pinkner; J. J. Abrams; Alex Kurtzman; Roberto Orci
- Production code: 3T7651
- Original air date: September 16, 2008
- Running time: 50 minutes

Guest appearances
- Derek Cecil as Christopher Penrose; Mark Blum as Dr. Claus Penrose; Betty Gilpin as Loraine "Amber" Daisy Alcott; Bernie McInerney as old Christopher Penrose; Elizabeth Stanley as Stacy; Carmen Goodine as Amy; Ty Jones as Doctor; Danielle Skraastad as Nurse; Jacqueline Beaulieu as Nina's assistant; Elisangela DiAlencar as FBI Agent; Karin Agstam as Scott's sister; Mark Vincent as Nurse; Michael Cerveris as The Observer

Episode chronology
← Previous "Pilot"	Next → "The Ghost Network"
- Fringe season 1

"The Same Old Story" is the second episode of the first season of the American science fiction drama television series Fringe. The episode was written by executive producer Jeff Pinkner and co-creators J. J. Abrams, Alex Kurtzman, and Roberto Orci. When developing the series, they sought to find a medium between serialized drama and the crime procedural. "The Same Old Story" was the first regular episode of Fringe, and journalists viewed it as an example of what they could expect from the series. It was directed by Paul A. Edwards.

After a newborn baby rapidly ages into an 80-year-old man, Fringe division agent Olivia Dunham (Anna Torv) and consultants Peter (Joshua Jackson) and Walter Bishop (John Noble) investigate. They tie the case to the murders of young women, who have all had their pituitary glands removed. It is revealed that Dr. Claus Penrose (Mark Blum), an expert in progeria, is working to help his son Christopher (Derek Cecil) stay alive, as he has rapid aging syndrome.

"The Same Old Story" first aired in the United States on September 16, 2008 on Fox. An estimated 13.272 million viewers watched the episode, a 45 percent increase from the series premiere. The episode received mixed reviews from television critics – reviewers thought it was an improvement from the previous episode but faulted it for containing plot contrivances.

== Plot ==
A prostitute is abandoned by an unknown man at a hospital, dangerously in labor. She dies as the doctors perform a caesarean section, but the child ages rapidly in minutes, soon dead having aged to the likes of a 90-year-old man. Olivia Dunham (Anna Torv), Peter Bishop (Joshua Jackson), and Walter Bishop (John Noble), new members of the Fringe division, are called to investigate by division head Phillip Broyles (Lance Reddick), believing the case to be part of "The Pattern", a string of mysterious incidents. The woman is identified as having recently left a local motel, and Olivia finds evidence that points to a past serial murder case she and her former partner John Scott were not able to solve. Olivia explains to Peter that their murderer would paralyze his victims, young women, then make an incision along their face to extract a piece of brain material, killing the victim in the process. Walter takes both corpses back to his lab and determines that the woman had only been pregnant minutes before giving birth, her child having a preternatural form of accelerated aging disease. Walter is reminded of having previously done work in this field, and remembers where he stashed his car that contains the related files. Once they are retrieved, Olivia makes a connection to the pituitary gland which controls growth in humans, and informs Charlie Francis (Kirk Acevedo) to monitor recent cases where the victims' pituitary gland has been removed.

Olivia and Peter turn to an expert in progeria, Dr. Penrose (Mark Blum), to try to learn more about rapid aging, but Dr. Penrose cannot help them further, though Peter suspects he is hiding something. Unseen by the Fringe division, Dr. Penrose visits an abandoned warehouse and meets the murderer, Christopher (Derek Cecil), his son, who has rapid aging syndrome. Penrose warns Christopher to be careful and that they only need one more woman to complete the process. By this time, Charlie has found a recent murder victim killed in the same fashion as Olivia's serial murderer. At Walter's lab, they identify the pituitary gland has been removed. They rationalize the murderer must extract hormones from the glands to slow down his own aging process. Walter hypothesizes they can discover the location of the crime by looking at the images left in the woman's optical nerves induced by the paralyzing sedative. Borrowing an electronic pulse camera from Massive Dynamic, they discover the image of a suspension bridge near Stoughton and identify the likely location from which it was viewed—the same warehouse that Dr. Penrose visited. The FBI converge on the building, and Olivia and Peter find Penrose about to cut into another victim. Olivia chases off after Christopher, who eventually succumbs to his rapid aging and dies, while Peter, after nicking Penrose with a bullet, confers with Walter to apply a makeshift defibrillator to bring the victim back to life.

As they wrap up the case, Olivia, Peter, and Walter complete forms to finalize their position in the Fringe division. When Peter is out of earshot, Walter learns from Olivia that the FBI medical files on Peter's childhood are void of any details.

== Production ==
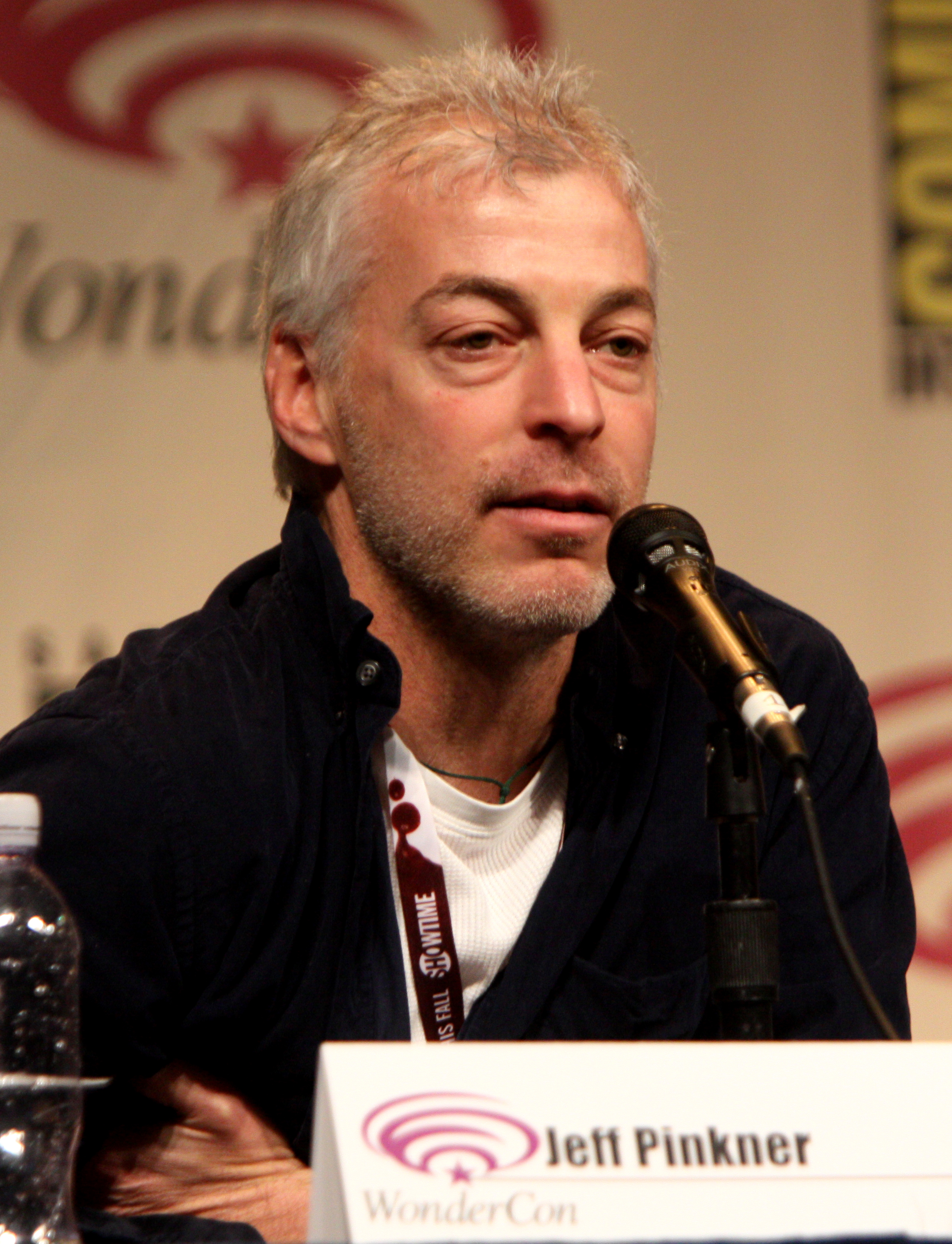
"The Same Old Story" was co written by Jeff Pinkner (pictured), J. J. Abrams, Alex Kurtzman and Roberto Orci.

Co-creators J. J. Abrams, Alex Kurtzman and Roberto Orci, and executive producer Jeff Pinkner wrote the episode. Paul A. Edwards served as the director, his first such credit for the series. In developing Fringe, the co-creators did not want to make the series too serialized, as this was a complaint often directed at Abrams' television series Alias. They wanted to find a balance between standalone stories and serialized content, and studied procedural dramas such as Law and Order and CSI: Crime Scene Investigation for inspiration. Kurztman explained, "While we make sure that our episodes are self-contained – have a beginning, a middle, and an end – the character stories can be serialized. They don't have to resolve themselves over the course of one show." "The Same Old Story" was Fringe's first regular episode, and some journalists viewed it as an example of how the series would be structured.

The episode was based on actual recent research and involved much collaboration among the series' different departments. For the scene in which they remove the victim's eyeball, the special effects crew created a mold based on actress Elizabeth Stanley's head. Using plaster to make a prosthetic, they "drilled out the eyeball and sculpt[ed] it open and [went] through a series of molds." Stanley stated that "it's really cool to see the head because it really does look just like me, even though it's very gruesome because the eyeball's popping out." The prop department rigged a weapon which they called a "photon gun"; according to prop master Peter Gelfman, this gun was based on real devices employed in airport security that look through people's clothing for concealed weapons. VFX Supervisor Christopher Scollard explained that for the eye's last vision, they used "a lot of actual photographic reference on the set and on the location," which they then used to "take that imagery and composite it into the various computer monitors and displays in the lab."

"The Same Old Story" featured guest appearances by actors Derek Cecil as Christopher Penrose and Mark Blum as his father, Dr. Claus Penrose. Other guest actors included Betty Gilpin as Loraine "Amber" Daisy Alcott, Bernie McInerney as old Christopher Penrose, Carmen Goodine as Amy, Ty Jones as a doctor, and Karin Agstam as John Scott's sister.

== Reception ==
=== Ratings ===
"The Same Old Story" was watched by 13.272 million viewers in the United States, a 45 percent increase of four million from the pilot. Fox claimed that this ratings improvement was the best for any new network drama series in over five years. Its high-rated lead-in, House, helped boost Fringe's ratings for the night, as 93 percent of House's total audience and 95 percent of 18- to 49-year-olds stayed to watch Fringe. Fringe was also the highest rated program for male 18- to 54-year-olds that evening.

=== Reviews ===
"The Same Old Story" received mixed reviews from television critics. TV Squad writer Jane Boursaw thought the episode seemed "all over the place", and wasn't sure what to think. She stated the two most interesting parts of the episode were when Walter removed the girl's eye in order to identity her killer, and the cliffhanger at the very end, when Walter states "If you've read my file, then you know the truth about Peter's medical history". Travis Fickett of IGN thought it was better than the pilot; though it was "laden with lots of clunky exposition and clichéd dialogue," Fickett understood that it was needed to acquaint new viewers to the show. Fickett concluded his review by saying Fringe has the potential to be a "great show", and he also praised the production level as "top notch", and Torv's performance as "very good" as she "brings a unique presence to the show". The A.V. Club critic Noel Murray gave the episode a C+, while Television Without Pity graded it with a B.

"The second episode of Fringe falls into the trap so many new series do: it essentially repeats the pilot, with a few new characters and a little more backstory... I'm still on-board, even though I liked this episode less than the premiere. The promise of Fringe is that it'll be a sort of freaky CSI, combining procedural beats with mind-blowing absurdity. That promise is still there. But as of yet... nothing great."

— The A.V. Club reviewer Noel Murray

Josh Jackson of Paste Magazine disliked the "deus ex machina" aspects that "neatly solved the puzzles of the first two episodes", and also criticized perceived "plot contrivances" like how the serial murderer immediately began aging once interrupted from killing his last victim. Despite these flaws, Jackson said he would tune in next week because he would "rather have a show err on the side of unbelievable than unremarkable, and I'm interested to see if Abrams has any more tricks up his sleeve". Erin Fox of TV Guide also liked "The Same Old Story" better than the pilot because she thought that it "had really cool special effects, awesome Walter-isms, and actual chemistry forming between Olivia and Peter", and "we also got to delve more into the connections between Walter, Nina Sharp, Massive Dynamic and the government and the experiments they conducted before Walter was institutionalized".

A UGO Networks columnist was concerned that the expensive pilot would be hard to translate into weekly episodes, but "after sitting down to watch Fringe's second episode, "The Same Old Story", my concerns have vanished. Fringe's second episode represents all that is holy about genre programming without sacrificing any of Fringe's eleven-herbs and spices. In fact, the subtle framework of what makes Fringe not X-Files is even better defined in the first weekly-episode. I'd struggled to find the word to describe it, and the winner is 'condensed'. "The Same Old Story" has all of the sense of mystery, discovery, and humor that the pilot had just in a smaller, more combustible space." Another UGO writer, Alex Zalben, later compared "The Same Old Story" to the similarly-plotted The X-Files episode "Død Kalm". Zalben concluded that "Fringe wins this one, just for having a slightly less stupid explanation."
