= Lord Darcy Investigates =

Book by Randall Garrett

- cover art from first edition
- Author: Randall Garrett
- Language: English
- Series: Lord Darcy series
- Genre: Fantasy, Science fiction, Alternate history, Mystery
- Publisher: Ace Books
- Publication date: 1981
- Publication place: United States
- Media type: Print (Paperback)
- Pages: 229 p.
- ISBN: 0-441-49142-1
- Preceded by: Too Many Magicians
- Followed by: Ten Little Wizards

Lord Darcy Investigates is a collection of short stories by Randall Garrett featuring his alternate history detective Lord Darcy. It was first published in paperback in 1981 by Ace Books, and has been reprinted a number of times since. It was later gathered together with Murder and Magic (1979) and Too Many Magicians into the omnibus collection Lord Darcy (1983, expanded 2002).

The book collects four Lord Darcy short stories originally published in the magazines Analog Science Fact & Fiction in October 1974 and December 1976, and June 1965, Fantastic in May 1976, Isaac Asimov's Science Fiction Magazine in April 1979.

The Lord Darcy stories are set in an alternate world whose history supposedly diverged from our own during the reign of King Richard the Lionheart, in which King John never reigned and most of Western Europe and the Americas are united in an Angevin Empire whose continental possessions were never lost by that king. In this world a magic-based technology has developed in place of the science of our own world.

== Contents ==
- "A Matter of Gravity" (1974)
- "The Ipswich Phial" (1976)
- "The Sixteen Keys" (1976)
- "The Napoli Express" (1979)

== Reception ==
Greg Costikyan reviewed Lord Darcy Investigates in Ares Magazine #12 and commented that "Personally, I find the Darcy series rather drab, but then I have never liked mysteries much. Those who enjoy the genre swear by Garrett, so my low opinion may be discounted."

David R. Dunham reviewed Lord Darcy Investigates for Different Worlds magazine and stated that "Murder and Magic and Lord Darcy Investigates contain four stories each, and in each case, three are good and one is fair."

== Reviews ==
- Review by Baird Searles (1982) in Isaac Asimov's Science Fiction Magazine, February 15, 1982
- Review by C. W. Sullivan, III (1982) in Science Fiction & Fantasy Book Review, #3, April 1982
- Review by Bob Barger (1982) in Science Fiction Review, Summer 1982
