= Michael Kurland =

American author (born 1938)

- Born: Michael Joseph Kurland; 1 March 1938 (age 88)
- Occupation: Author
- Writing career
- Genres: Science fiction, mystery
- Notable work: Professor Moriarty series

Michael Joseph Kurland (born March 1, 1938) is an American author, best known for his works of science fiction and detective fiction. Kurland lives in San Luis Obispo, California.

== Writing career ==
Kurland's early career was devoted to works of science fiction. His first published novel was Ten Years to Doomsday (written with Chester Anderson) in 1964. Other notable works include Tomorrow Knight, Pluribus, Perchance, and The Unicorn Girl. The Unicorn Girl was the middle volume of the Greenwich Village Trilogy by three different authors, the other two being Chester Anderson and T.A. Waters. (Anderson's book, The Butterfly Kid, was nominated for a Hugo Award.) Kurland has also written two novels, Ten Little Wizards and A Study in Sorcery, set in the world of Randall Garrett's Lord Darcy, prefiguring his later success as a mystery writer.

Following the success of The Infernal Device, which was nominated for an Edgar Award (as was his earlier A Plague of Spies), Kurland turned his attention to detective fiction. Several of his subsequent novels have been sequels to The Infernal Device, and feature Sherlock Holmes's nemesis, Professor Moriarty. In this series, Professor Moriarty is an antihero (and sometimes a real hero) who resignedly tolerates Holmes's obsessively exaggerated opinion of his criminal empire, and is often brought into reluctant alliance with his nemesis in order to counter menaces ranging from threats to their associates to threats to the nation.

He has edited three themed anthologies of Sherlock Holmes short stories, My Sherlock Holmes (stories narrated by characters other than Watson or Holmes), Sherlock Holmes: The Hidden Years (stories set during the period in which Holmes was supposed to be dead) and Sherlock Holmes: the American Years (stories set in the time between Holmes' graduation from university and his meeting Dr. Watson).

He is also the author of numerous non-fiction works, including How to Solve a Murder: the Forensic Handbook and How to Try a Murder: the Handbook for Armchair Lawyers.

== Selected works ==
=== Professor Moriarty series ===
- The Infernal Device (1978); reprinted in The Infernal Device and others
- Death by Gaslight (1982); reprinted in The Infernal Device and others
- "The Paradol Paradox" (in The Infernal Device and others, 2001; Victorian Villainy, 2011)
- The Great Game (2001)
- "Years Ago and in a Different Place" (in My Sherlock Holmes, 2003; Victorian Villainy, 2011)
- "Reichenbach" (in Sherlock Holmes: The Hidden Years, 2004; Victorian Villainy, 2011)
- The Empress of India (2006)
- "The Picture of Oscar Wilde" (included in both Victorian Villainy, 2011 and My Love of All that is Bizarre, 2013)
- Who Thinks Evil (2014)

=== Lord Darcy series ===
- Ten Little Wizards (1988)
- A Study in Sorcery (1989)

=== Alexander Brass series ===
- Too Soon Dead (1997)
- The Girls in the High-Heeled Shoes (1998)
- "He Couldn't Fly" (in The Mammoth Book of Roaring Twenties Whodunnits) (2004)

=== War Incorporated series ===
- Mission: Third Force (1967)
- Mission: Tank War (1968)
- A Plague of Spies (1969)

=== Science fiction ===
- Ten Years to Doomsday (with Chester Anderson) (1964)
- The Unicorn Girl (1969)
- Transmission Error (1970)
- Pluribus (1975)
- The Whenabouts of Burr (1975)
- Tomorrow Knight (1976)
- The Princes of Earth (Young Adult) (1978)
- The Last President (S. W. Barton) (1980)
- Psi Hunt (1980)
- First Cycle (posthumous editing and expanding of a manuscript by H. Beam Piper) (1982)
- Star Griffin (1987)
- Perchance (1988)
- Button Bright (1990)

=== Anthologies (as editor) ===
- My Sherlock Holmes: Untold Stories of the Great Detective (2003)
- Sherlock Holmes: The Hidden Years (2004)
- Sherlock Holmes: The American Years (2010)

=== Short stories ===
- "Elementary" (with Laurence M. Janifer) (1964)
- "Bond of Brothers" (1965)
- "Please State My Business" (1965)
- "Fimbulsommer" (with Randall Garrett) (1970)
- "Small World" (1973)
- "Think Only This of Me" (1973)
- "A Brief Dance to the Music of the Spheres" (1983)
- "In the Blood" (1995)
- "The Rite Stuff" (2004)
- "Four Hundred Slaves" (2005)

=== Nonfiction ===
- The Spymaster's Handbook (1988)
- A Gallery of Rogues: Portraits in True Crime (1994)
- How to Solve a Murder: The Forensic Handbook (1995)
- How to Try a Murder: The Handbook for Armchair Lawyers (1997)
- Irrefutable Evidence – Adventures in the History of Forensic Science (2009)
