= Murder and Magic =

Book by Randall Garrett

- cover art from first edition
- Author: Randall Garrett
- Cover artist: Robert Adragna
- Language: English
- Series: Lord Darcy series
- Genre: Fantasy, science fiction, alternate history, Mystery
- Publisher: Ace Books
- Publication date: 1979
- Publication place: United States
- Media type: Print (Paperback)
- Pages: 266
- ISBN: 0-441-54540-8
- OCLC: 4911289
- Followed by: Too Many Magicians

Murder and Magic is a collection of short stories by American writer Randall Garrett, featuring his alternate history detective Lord Darcy. It was first published in paperback in 1979 by Ace Books, and has been reprinted a number of times since. It was later gathered together with Too Many Magicians (1967) and Lord Darcy Investigates (1981) into the omnibus collection Lord Darcy (1983, expanded 2002).

The book collects four Lord Darcy short stories originally published in the magazine Analog Science Fact & Fiction in January 1964, November 1964, and June 1965, and the Dean W. Dickensheet edited anthology Men & Malice, (Doubleday, 1973).

The Lord Darcy stories are set in an alternate world whose history supposedly diverged from our own during the reign of King Richard the Lionheart, in which King John never reigned and most of Western Europe and the Americas are united in an Angevin Empire whose continental possessions were never lost by that king. In this world a magic-based technology has developed in place of the science of our own world.

== Contents ==
- "The Eyes Have It" (1964)
- "A Case of Identity" (1964)
- "The Muddle of the Woad" (1965)
- "A Stretch of the Imagination" (1973)

== Reception ==
David R. Dunham reviewed Murder and Magic for Different Worlds magazine and stated that "Murder and Magic and Lord Darcy Investigates contain four stories each, and in each case, three are good and one is fair."

== Reviews ==
- Review by Spider Robinson (1979) in Destinies, August–September 1979
