= Lord Darcy (character) =

Fictional detective

- First appearance: The Eyes Have It
- Last appearance: A Study in Sorcery (written by Michael Kurland)
- Created by: Randall Garrett

In-universe information
- Gender: Male
- Occupation: Forensic investigator
- Nationality: English

Lord Darcy is a detective in a fantasy alternate history, created by Randall Garrett.

The first stories were asserted to take place in the same year as they were published, but in a world with an alternate history that is different from the real world and that is governed by the rules of magic rather than the rules of physics. Despite the magical trappings, the Lord Darcy stories play fair as whodunnits; magic is never used to "cheat" a solution, and indeed, the mundane explanation is often obscured by the leap to assume a magical cause.

Garrett penned 10 short stories and a novel starring Lord Darcy. After his death, Michael Kurland wrote two more novels featuring the character.

== Title character ==
Lord Darcy is the Chief Forensic Investigator or Chief Criminal Investigator for the Duke of Normandy (Prince Richard, the brother of the king), and sometime Special Investigator for the High Court of Chivalry. An Englishman, he lives in Rouen, but spends very little time there. The audience learns that he speaks Anglo-French with an English accent, and that he speaks several languages and dialects fluently.

His full name is never given; he is always referred to by his title as the Lord of Arcy (i.e., Lord d'Arcy or Lord Darcy), even by his friends. He dresses in the style of an English aristocrat. He thinks of himself as English and yet Arcy seems to be a French place name. How he comes to be addressed as a "Lord" is never explained, though he seems deferential when dealing with other Peers such as Dukes, Counts, and a Marquis. In Too Many Magicians Darcy is said to be a cousin of the Marquis of London.

There are two conflicting reports of Lord Darcy's age. In "The Muddle of the Woad" he's described as a few years older than the King, who's ten years older than the Duke of Normandy, who was 19 years old in "The Eyes Have It", which is set in 1963. This places Lord Darcy's date of birth around 1931. However, he's described in "The Spell of War" as an 18-year-old lieutenant in the autumn of the War of '39, which would make him about ten years older.

His assistant is Master Sean O'Lochlainn, a sorcerer who undertakes magical forensic work. Master Sean is highly proud of Irish magic and its superiority to those of other countries (especially to Polish magic).

== Works ==
Too Many Magicians is the only Lord Darcy novel written by Randall Garrett: it first appeared in Analog magazine from August to November 1966 and was issued in book form by Doubleday in 1967. This was followed by two short story collections: Murder and Magic (1979), and Lord Darcy Investigates (1981), containing stories that had appeared in Analog, Fantastic and other magazines. Garrett's extended illness and death prevented him from writing more Lord Darcy tales as he had intended.

Two more Lord Darcy novels, Ten Little Wizards (1988), and A Study in Sorcery (1989), were written by Garrett's friend Michael Kurland after Garrett's death. The two titles were manifestly modeled on those of famous detective novels by, respectively, Agatha Christie and Arthur Conan Doyle. This is similar to the way that Too Many Magicians was modeled on a famous novel by Rex Stout (whose Nero Wolfe and Archie Goodwin have counterparts in the novel's universe in the Marquis de London and his Special Investigator, Lord Bontriomphe). In the eleventh chapter of Ten Little Wizards, Kurland sets Lord Darcy's rank in the peerage as a Baron.

=== Short stories ===
1. "The Eyes Have It" (1964)
2. "A Case of Identity" (1964)
3. "The Muddle of the Woad" (1965)
4. "A Stretch of the Imagination" (1973)
5. "Matter of Gravity" (1974)
6. "The Ipswich Phial" (1976)
7. "The Sixteen Keys" (1976)
8. "The Bitter End" (1978)
9. "The Napoli Express" (1979)
10. "The Spell of War" (1979)

=== Novel ===
- Too Many Magicians (1967, ISBN 0-441-81698-3)

=== Novels by Michael Kurland ===
- Ten Little Wizards (1988, ISBN 0-441-80057-2)
- A Study in Sorcery (1989, ISBN 0-441-79092-5)

Also: Michael Kurland's 1969 novel The Unicorn Girl features protagonists who jump into a series of alternate timelines – and one of the timelines they land in is Lord Darcy's. However, while several minor characters from the Lord Darcy series appear in The Unicorn Girl, neither Lord Darcy nor Master Sean are featured.

=== Collections ===
- Murder and Magic (1979, ISBN 0-441-54541-6) contains short stories 1, 2, 3, and 4
- Lord Darcy Investigates (1981, ISBN 0-441-49142-1) contains short stories 5, 6, 7, and 9
- Lord Darcy (1983) omnibus edition containing:
  - Murder and Magic (see above)
  - Too Many Magicians (see above)
  - Lord Darcy Investigates (see above)
- Lord Darcy 2002 edition (ISBN 0-7434-7184-9)
  - Includes all ten short stories, and Too Many Magicians.

=== Reception ===
In 1999, Randall Garrett was posthumously awarded the Sidewise Award for Alternate History Special Achievement Award for the Lord Darcy series.

The Lord Darcy series is described in The Encyclopedia of Science Fiction as Garrett's "most impressive solo work".

== Darcy's world ==
=== Magic ===
Magic is a scientific discipline, codified in the fourteenth century by Saint Hilary Robert, much involved with higher mathematics and possessed of theoretical and experimental underpinnings as sophisticated as those of real world physics and chemistry. Licensed Sorcerers, possessed of the Talent and properly trained, achieve a wide range of effects. Healing by the laying on of hands is effective and a commonplace treatment for disease and injury; thanks to the efficacy of the Healers, it is common for people to live to the age of 100 and not rare for people to live to 125.

Black magic is not a categorically different type of magic, but a matter of symbolism and intent, at least in the Anglo-French sphere, as the Kingdom of Italy requests extradition of a woman for black magic when her actual offense was no more than unlicensed magic. However, the effect of symbolism and intent can be substantial; one character, a Witch-Smeller, is capable of detecting its effects on the black magician and his victims.

Although magic is a central part of all the stories, none of the murders Lord Darcy investigates are directly caused by magic. All the homicides are committed by mundane means.

=== Social structure ===
France and the British Isles are combined into a single state as the Anglo-French Empire, and Russia, Italy, and Germany continue as loose collections of small states. Society is stratified, with the most important government positions held by nobles, who dispense justice and still maintain private soldiers. The Church is powerful and a central component of everyone's life (there had never been a Reformation, or it took a very different form, as some of the worst abuses of the late-Medieval/Renaissance Catholic Church seem to have been eliminated or minimized). However, serfdom is as dead as in the real world, and the rights of the common people appear to be somewhat well protected.

Anglo-French regard themselves as fortunate in comparison to the subjects of the Polish King, who are reported to be living under a terrible tyranny. The characters all live in the Anglo-French domain, but include a Polish refugee, who was accused by the Italian government of black magic and is compelled to spy for Poland by a threat to her uncle.

=== Education ===
Little is mentioned of education, although Oxford continues. Lord Darcy is mentioned as being a graduate of the fictional Magog College (1954). A fictional St. Thomas' Academy is also mentioned.

=== Technology ===
Technology and physical sciences have suffered somewhat with the emphasis on magic. Physics has not been codified as a science; the one example of an investigator into the discipline is an eccentric on a par with the members of the real world Flat Earth Society. Most mechanical devices are approximately those of the Victorian era. Characters travel by horse-drawn carriage and steam train and employ revolving pistols and bolt-action rifles; buildings are illuminated with gas lights. An electric torch, with magical parts, is "a fantastic device, a secret of His Majesty's Government." Messages can be sent by an electrical device called the "teleson", but the principles by which it operates are not well understood, and the technology to lay teleson lines underwater or over water has not yet been developed and so it is impossible to communicate across the Channel.

Food is sometimes preserved in iceboxes; a magical "food preservator" has been invented, but preservators are expensive and rare because the stasis spell used is expensive to maintain, requiring the services of a specialist Journeyman or Master-grade magician. Sorcery is commonly employed in murder investigations, in much the same fashion as forensic science in the real world. Medical technology is not as advanced as in the real world, because Healers are so effective, indeed the use of drugs with a genuine but non-magical benefit ("may cover a wound with moldy bread... or give a patient with heart trouble a tea brewed of foxglove") is regarded as little more than superstition.

=== International situation ===
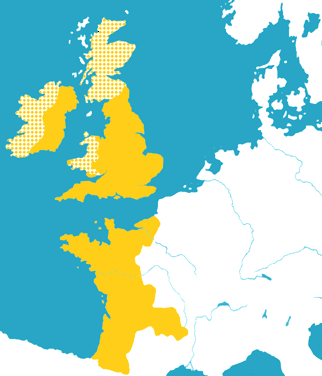
The Angevin Empire in 1172, before the point of divergence of Randall Garrett's Lord Darcy series

The Anglo-French Empire was established by the Plantagenets, whose dynasty has continued to rule and continues to use the Palace of Westminster as a royal residence, with Parliament far weaker than in the real world timeline. Richard I returned to England after he was wounded at the siege of Chaluz, but he later recovered and ruled well, meaning that John Lackland never held the throne and died in exile. Richard then went on to a decisive victory in the Anglo-French War, which, in real world history, King John lost. Richard dethroned the Capetian Dynasty and made himself and his successors Kings of France as well as of England, both kingdoms being ruled from London, while Paris was left into the 20th century a provincial town that broods over its lost glory.

The Duchy of Normandy remained attached to the English crown and never separated from it. Richard died in 1219 and was succeeded by his nephew Arthur, whose reign was remembered as a Golden Age and sometimes confused in the popular imagination with that of King Arthur. The present king, 750 years later, is "John IV, by the Grace of God, King and Emperor of England, France, Scotland, Ireland [all the Anglo-French Empire], New England [North America], and New France [South America]; Defender of the Faith, et cetera".

To judge by the Irishman who has a central role in the stories, the Irish in this timeline do not feel particularly oppressed under the Anglo-French throne and have no inclination to become independent. Ireland seems to have been spared traumatic periods of foreign colonisation and dispossession, and since everybody is Catholic, it has no problems of rival religious-ethnic communities. Moreover, the Irish are considered especially skilled in Magic, a source of upwards social mobility and prestige.

The king is also Holy Roman Emperor, exercising loose sovereignty over the many small German and Italian states. However, his actual exercise of sovereignty is limited by the ability of German states to call upon the Poles for help. The chronologically-first but not the first-written Lord Darcy story takes place during a military confrontation between Anglo-French and Polish forces on the soil of Bavaria.

In Italy, the King-Emperor is more of a constitutional monarch, with an Italian Parliament seemingly holding much more power than the one in London (in a story set in Italy, a local policeman emphasizes that his oath of office is to the Parliament, rather than to the King). There is no mention, however, of whether the Parliament is appointed or elected or by whom. Italy being united implies that the Catholic Church was, like in real world history, deprived at some time of its Temporal power over the city of Rome and its environs, but there is no mention of when and how that happened.

Poland is a major power and the chief rival of the Anglo-French, and both exist in a situation of Cold War; some of the stories are spy thrillers in which Lord Darcy is pitted against Polish agents and takes on some of the attributes of James Bond (with some magic ingredients added, such as a spell used to make him fall madly in love with a beautiful female Polish agent).

Hungary is part of the Polish Empire (the University of Buda-Pest is mentioned as one of Poland's major institutes of learning), which seems to extend southwards into the Balkans. It is stated that Kiev is part of the Polish Empire, as well as most of the Ukrainian steppe. The Russias are no more than a set of fractious statelets, which might unify in the face of Polish aggression but as yet have failed to do so (it had been close to that situation in some periods of real world history, as during the Polish-Muscovite War (1605–1618)).

The main strategy of the Anglo-French is to bottle up the Poles and deny them access to the world's oceans. There is mention of a war in the 1940s (roughly equivalent to World War II but of a much more limited extent) in which the Polish Navy was decisively beaten. Since then, an alliance with the Scandinaviams at the exit from the Baltic and with the Roumelians (Byzantines) at the exit from the Black Sea denies passage to Polish warships, but they try to circumvent this blockade and build an ocean-going navy with the help of some African states.

As noted, the Byzantine Empire continues to exist and is, at least at times, an Anglo-French ally, but it is a minor power corresponding to real world Greece, with its main importance being the control of the strategic Dardanelles. The Osmanlis rule a realm beyond it that has apparently never spread beyond Anatolia. The Kingdoms of Castile and Aragon never united into a single Spanish realm and were never of much account, and Southern Spain is still predominantly Muslim (one story features a suave Muslim from Granada residing in London).

Since the Point of Departure, which set the alternate history off is the survival of Richard the Lion Heart until 1219 and his success in eliminating the Capetians and making himself King of France, the Fourth Crusade of 1204, which fatally crippled the Byzantine Empire in real world history, presumably never took place in this history. Also, with John Lackland never taking the throne, he never had a chance to behave tyrannically as a king and so there was no rebellion culminating in the Magna Carta, which may very partially explain the lack of any democratic institutions in this 20th century. (Garrett may have thus meant to imply that the villains of history sometimes have their uses.)

Mexico (Mechicoe in Anglo-French) is still ruled by Aztecs, who are headed by the Christianised descendants of Montezuma after they have been taken into the empire's high nobility and possess considerable autonomy. North America, the whole of which is called "New England", is in the process of being settled by Europeans, but the process is far less advanced than in real world history, with Native American tribes in the 1960s still able to offer significant resistance to whites encroaching on their land. However, there is also mention of thriving tobacco plantations, which seems to indicate that the equivalent of the American South is more thickly settled than the American North. Mention is made of the first European ships reaching the shores of new England in 1569.

Little is mentioned of "New France" (South America) beyond a single mention of its jungles being a punitive posting to unruly soldiers from which it is clear that Native inhabitants are far from completely subdued there either.

There are only few references to Africa. Lord Darcy's father, who was an army "coronel" (colonel), is mentioned as having fought in a war at Sudan, which might be not exactly the same as the real world timeline's state of that name. In West Africa, black states are mentioned as maintaining their independence, keeping a balance between the Anglo-French and the Poles and possessing enough technology to equip modern warships. The impression given is that Africa was not as heavily touched by colonialism as in the real world timeline. (Presumably, that is because the Anglo-French have a whole continent at their disposal on the other side of the Atlantic and do their best to bar Polish access.)
