= Vicki Ann Heydron =

American writer

Vicki Ann Heydron (born 21 October 1945) is an American writer of speculative fiction and poetry.

Born in Sacramento, she wrote most of her work in collaboration with her husband Randall Garrett. Her principal work is the Gandalara Cycle (1981–1986), a seven-volume fantasy series. Although both Garrett and Heydron are credited as authors, she is believed to be the principal author given that Garrett was incapacitated for most of the series' publication history.

== Bibliography ==
Gandalara Cycle (with Randall Garrett)

Published by Bantam Books. Republished as two omnibus volumes, The Gandalara Cycle I and II (1986)

1. The Steel of Raithskar (1981)
2. The Glass of Dyskornis (1982)
3. The Bronze of Eddarta (1983)
4. The Well of Darkness (1983)
5. The Search for Kä (1984)
6. Return to Eddarta (1985)
7. The River Wall (1986)
