= Anticomp Folkilation =

Compilation album by various artists
- Released: February 11, 2007
- Genre: Anti-folk
- Label: Crafty Records
- Producers: Dan Treiber; Dan Costello; Brook Pridemore

Professional ratings
Review scores
Source	Rating
Time Out New York	3/5 stars

Anticomp Folkilation is a 2-CD compilation album featuring a variety of artists from New York's anti-folk scene.

== Sounds and themes ==
This album itself has been described as incongruous yet in line with traditional Folk and Punk sensibilities.

== Track listing ==
=== CD 1 ===
1. Major Matt Mason USA – Tripping Yourself
2. Brook Pridemore – Sugar Coma (Snakes on My Brain)
3. Soft Black – The Earth is Black
4. The Wowz – You're Lovely
5. Toby Goodshank – Black Eye
6. A Brief View of the Hudson – She Will Never Speak
7. Jeffrey Lewis and Diane Cluck – The River
8. Jason Trachtenburg – Anyone Can Tell (In the Rain)
9. Kimya Dawson – Will You Be Me
10. Masheen Gun Kelly – Don't Bug Me I'm On My First Cup
11. Lowry – Boone's Farm
12. Elastic No-No Band – Sally's Strut
13. ThREe DrinKs tO LizZie – splash'o'gin
14. Beau Johnson – Gypsy
15. The Real Urban Barnyard – Pooper Scooper
16. Dan Penta – Joyless Now
17. Lach – Baby
18. Dan Costello – M&M's (I Love You More)

=== CD 2 ===
1. Eric Wolfson – Sleeping is a Sucker's Game
2. Griffin and the True Believers – Beautiful Weather
3. Ivan Sandomire – Drunk Faeries
4. Matt Singer – VHS
5. Erin Regan – Your Mom's Car
6. Paleface – I Don't Think I Like You (As Much As I Used To)
7. David LK Murphy – Peace of Mind
8. Dead Blonde Girlfriend – Velvet Coffin
9. The Festival – The Ink Festival
10. Ben Godwin – Terminus
11. The Sewing Circle – Sewer Gators NYC
12. Creaky Boards – I'm So Serious This Time
13. The Bowmans – The Slumber
14. Dan Fishback – Faggotssaywhat?
15. Frank Hoier – I Can't Love You Anymore
16. Debe Dalton – Ed's Song
17. Urban Barnyard – Johnny's Kitchen
