= Quick Frozen Small Yellow Cracker =

Studio album by Schwervon!
- Released: 2000
- Genre: Antifolk, Lo-fi, Indie rock
- Label: Olive Juice Music (US), Shoeshine Records (UK)
- Producer: Major Matt Mason USA, Tom Nishioka

Schwervon! chronology
Quick Frozen Small Yellow Cracker (2000)	Poseur (2004)

Professional ratings
Review scores
Source	Rating
Allmusic	3/5 stars

Quick Frozen Small Yellow Cracker is the debut album by Schwervon!, a band consisting of Major Matt Mason USA and Nan Turner, the latter formerly of the band Bionic Finger.

The album was released on CD in the US by Major Matt's own label Olive Juice Music in 2000. It was later issued in the UK by Teenage Fanclub drummer Francis MacDonald's Shoeshine Records with 3 additional tracks.

== Track listing ==
1. "American Girl"
2. "Dinner"
3. "Eyesore"
4. "Breaking In"
5. "Springtime"
6. "Holy Cat"
7. "Twin Donut"
8. "Schwervon!"
9. "Something Else" (UK bonus track)
10. "Boat Song" (UK bonus track)
11. "Surfin' Bird" (UK bonus track)
