= The Beekman School =

Location
- 220 E 50th St, New York, NY 10022; Manhattan; U.S. 40°45′19″N 73°58′12″W

Information
- Established: 1925
- Headmaster: Maren Holmen
- Faculty: 10
- Grades: 9-12
- Enrollment: 75
- Color: Blue/White
- Website: http://www.beekmanschool.org/

The Beekman School (originally The Tutoring School of New York) is a private high school in New York City. It primarily serves grades 9-12 .

== History ==
Founded in 1925, and incorporated in 1927, The Tutoring School of New York offers high school diploma requirements to students one-on-one. Located in a Manhattan townhouse, teachers are hired based on specific student needs.

In 1990, the school changed its name to The Beekman School, with The Tutoring School becoming a program within The Beekman School. The Beekman program features classes with an average 7:1 student-to-teacher ratio, a rolling admissions policy, as well as flexible scheduling and course options.

== Academics ==
The Beekman School is a college preparatory program. Course curricula is designed to meet or exceed the requirements set by the New York State Board of Regents and prepare students for colleges and universities worldwide. All students must write a research paper during the fourth quarter in their English class.

== International Students ==
The Beekman School accepts international students and for the 2012 school year had four Chinese students who roomed with local families.

== Notable alumni ==
- Zachary Cole Smith, singer and frontman of DIIV (did not graduate)

== See also ==
- Education in New York City
