= Major Matt Mason USA =

American singer

- Born: Matt Roth; Shawnee, Kansas, U.S.
- Genres: Anti-folk, DIY

Major Matt Mason USA is the recording project of Matt Roth, an American musician and record producer active in the anti-folk and DIY music scene of New York's East Village.

== Life and career ==
A native of Shawnee, Kansas, Roth moved to New York in the early 1990s, where Antifolk founder Lach gave him his new name, based on the action figure Major Matt Mason. He established Olive Juice Music, a recording studio, independent record label, and online record shop based in his apartment on the Lower East Side.

Roth has collaborated with Jeffrey Lewis, The Moldy Peaches, Toby Goodshank, Kimya Dawson, LD Beghtol, Rachel Trachtenburg, Adam Green, The Baby Skins, Prewar Yardsale, The Leader, Dan Fishback, Dave End, Elastic No-No Band, and Peter Dizozza. In addition to his work as a solo performer, he is also a member of the bands Schwervon! and Kansas State Flower.

Roth has toured extensively throughout the United States and Europe with Schwervon! and as a solo performer, often supporting members of the anti-folk movement, such as Jeffrey Lewis. He has been the headline act for anti-folk tours throughout the United Kingdom. In 2017, Roth formed a side project, Broken Heart Syndrome, featuring Pat Tomek of The Rainmakers on drums. In 2019, as well as continuing to perform as a solo acoustic artist, Major Matt Mason USA has more recently appeared as a trio featuring electric guitar, bass, and drums.

In 2012, Roth relocated to Shawnee, Kansas.

== Discography ==
=== As solo performer ===
- The Lobster Song/Mr. & Mrs. Something (7-inch single, 1994. HC Records) (as Major Matt Mason)
- Me Me Me (1998)
- Rivington '94 and the Tower Days (2001)
- Honey Are You Ready for the Ballet? (2002)
- Bad People Rule the World (2004)
- Senile Pie Strive Pip Melancholy (2007)

=== Compilation appearances ===
- Call It What You Want: This Is Antifolk (2002) - "Animal Shelter"
- Antifolk, Vol. 1 (2002) - "Rockstar"
- I Killed the Monster: 21 Artists Performing the Songs of Daniel Johnston (2006) - "Mind Contorted"
- Anticomp Folkilation (2007) - "Tripping Yourself"
- Rachel Trachtenburg's Homemade World (2009) - "The Dog Song"
