= Me Me Me (album) =

Studio album by Major Matt Mason USA
- Released: 1998
- Recorded: Kakumodani Studios
- Genre: Antifolk
- Length: 60:28
- Label: Olive Juice Music (US), Shoeshine Records (UK)
- Producer: Major Matt Mason USA, Tom Nishioka

Major Matt Mason USA chronology
The Lobster Song/Mr. & Mrs. Something single (1994)	Me Me Me (1998)	Rivington '94 and the Tower Days (2001)

Professional ratings
Review scores
Source	Rating
Allmusic	4/5 stars

Me Me Me was the first album by antifolk singer/songwriter Matt Roth using the performing name Major Matt Mason USA.The album is a completely solo effort, consisting mostly of Roth singing and playing an acoustic guitar, with occasional overdubs and reverse tape effects.

The album was released in 1998 on Roth's label Olive Juice Music in the US, and on Francis MacDonald's label Shoeshine Records in the UK.

== Track listing ==
1. "Mr. Softie" - 3:56
2. "Budapest" - 3:05
3. "Rockstar" - 3:36
4. "The Ballad of Danny Scheer" - 3:27
5. "Inside of You" - 2:42
6. "Black Hole" - 3:29
7. "I Know You Know" - 4:11
8. "Rose Paned Glasses" - 1:50
9. "Price Is Right'" - 4:35
10. "Apple Sauce" - 4:44
11. "I'm Sorry" - 3:57
12. "Goodbye Southern Death Swing" - 4:11
13. "Kicker" - 0:58
14. "Krooklyn" - 4:13
15. "Waitress Song" - 5:19
16. "Plutonium" - 6:25
