= Elastic No-No Band =

- Origin: New York City, USA
- Genres: Anti-folk, indie rock
- Years active: 2004–2011
- Label: Weemayk Music
- Members: Justin Remer; Herb Scher; Preston Spurlock; Doug Johnson; John Mulcahy
- Past members: Clint Scheibner
- Website: elasticnonoband.com

Elastic No-No Band was a musical group based in New York City's anti-folk scene. Started in the mid-2000s, the band's name was initially just a pseudonym for its leader and main songwriter, Justin Remer. After 2005, Elastic No-No Band's line-up also included pianist Herb Scher and multi-instrumentalist Preston Spurlock. In 2005 and 2006, the band would perform sporadically with Clint Scheibner, who would play a bass drum attached to his chest, as though he were in a marching band. In 2007, the band added drummer Doug Johnson (who plays a standard drum kit) as a regular member. During the recording sessions for the band's 2010 album, Fustercluck!!!, electric guitarist John Mulcahy was also added.

Remer did a solo US tour as Elastic No-No Band during spring of 2008.

== Film Music ==
Remer initially used the name Elastic No-No Band as a personal pseudonym when he wrote and performed songs and film scores for some of his short films. These films include In Defense of Lemmings (2004) and Loved and/or Laid (2006). Remer also contributed songs to the Troma films Tales from the Crapper (2004) and Poultrygeist: Night of the Chicken Dead (2007) as Elastic No-No Band.

== Lo-fi/home recordings ==
While he was studying film at New York University, Remer used the facilities intended for recording voice-over for film projects to create four lo-fi solo albums. These albums were Songs from a Poorly-Soundproofed Room (2004) (the title is a parody of Leonard Cohen's Songs from a Room), More Songs About Cowboys and Moisture (2004) (the title is a parody of Talking Heads' More Songs About Buildings and Food), an album of Elvis Costello covers called Every Elvis Has His Army: ENB Does EC (2005), and (Previously Otherwise) Uncollected Songs (2005). These albums were initially distributed using the CD-R format, then were made available as a free music download from Elastic No-No Band's website. When the website was shut down at the end of 2011, Remer compiled the website tracks into a two-volume compilation, collectively titled Not Like Most Folkies.

Remer began performing at the Anti-hootenanny open mic run by Lach at the Sidewalk Cafe (the center of New York's East Village anti-folk scene). This is where he met Scher, Spurlock, and Scheibner. The men performed shows together and made home recordings of some of their rehearsals. Five of these rehearsal recordings, featuring the trio of Remer, Scher, and Spurlock are featured on Elastic No-No Band's first official CD release, The Very Best of Elastic No-No Band So Far (2006). Scheibner is credited on the release with "silent drumming." The remainder of the CD consists of songs from the four CD-R albums Remer recorded alone and a newer solo recording titled "Run-DMC."

In 2007, the band issued No-No's (Leftovers and Live Songs), which consists of previously unreleased material, live performances, and previously issued one-off recordings from compilations. According to Remer, the songs are called "leftovers" instead of "B-sides" or "rarities" because they're no rarer than any of the band's other songs. This CD includes the first recorded live performances with the band's second drummer, Doug Johnson.

== My 3 Addictions ==
This new quartet line-up created Elastic No-No Band's first studio album, titled My 3 Addictions. It was produced by Major Matt Mason USA. It was released on October 16, 2007.

Justin Remer set up a blog in advance of the album's release called "My 3 Addictions: An interactive album". Starting September 3, 2007, Remer posted a new entry every other day, including an audio stream of one of the album's songs. Since September 23, 2007, all eleven songs have been available for listening from the blog.

== Fustercluck!!! ==
Elastic No-No Band released their second studio album, a double album called Fustercluck!!! in January 2010. It featured numerous guest appearances from other antifolk acts, like Toby Goodshank of The Moldy Peaches, Nan Turner of Schwervon!, and Brook Pridemore. The album also marked the addition of electric guitarist John Mulcahy to the band. It would turn out to be their last proper studio album, as the band dissolved in late 2011. A final "leftovers" compilation, Black No-No's was scheduled to be released in May 2012.

== Pop culture references ==
Many of Elastic No-No Band's songs feature humorous lyrics based on pop culture references.

"Run-DMC" mentions the titular hip-hop group, as well as fellow hip-hoppers Eric B. & Rakim, R&B singer Bobby "Blue" Bland, and actor Mr. T.

"I Am Klaus Kinski (And This Is My Song)" is told from the point of view of the famed German actor and mentions his squabbles with his frequent collaborator, the German film director Werner Herzog.

"A Modest Proposal (For Laura Cantrell)" has Remer proposing marriage to the country music singer Laura Cantrell and mentioning past romantic crushes on female musicians like Liz Phair, Juliana Hatfield, and Meg White.

"Woody Allen Surrogate (Kenneth Branagh's Blues)" is from the point of view of British actor and director Kenneth Branagh, who starred in Woody Allen's film Celebrity. The song discusses actors who have played the "Woody Allen part" in movies that Allen has directed but not starred in, such as John Cusack (in Bullets Over Broadway) and Jason Biggs (in Anything Else). Sean Penn is noted in the song for "avoiding it" in his performance in Sweet and Lowdown.

== Discography ==
=== Albums ===
- Songs from a Poorly-Soundproofed Room (2004) (CD-R)
- More Songs About Cowboys and Moisture (2004) (CD-R)
- Every Elvis Has His Army: ENB Does EC (2005) (CD-R)
- (Previously Otherwise) Uncollected Songs (2005) (CD-R)
- The Very Best of Elastic No-No Band So Far (2006)
- No-No's (Leftovers and Live Songs) (2007)
- My 3 Addictions (2007)
- Fustercluck!!! (2010)
- Charmingly Shambolic and Mostly Live (2011)
- Not Like Most Folkies - Part 1: The First Two Albums & Other Early Originals (2012) [Compilation taken from the CD-R albums and the first 2 official CD releases]
- Not Like Most Folkies - Part 2: Early Covers (2012) [Compilation taken from the CD-R albums]
- Black No-No's (2012)
- Anthology: Cheese Fries, Klaus Kinski, and Manboobs (2014) [10th anniversary career-spanning compilation]
- Decayed: A Re-Fuster-Dux Deluxe (2020)
- Fuster No-No's: Sessions, Demos, Ephemera 2008-2011 (2020)

=== EPs & Singles ===
- The Meow Bits (2008)
- Every Elvis Has His Impersonators: 7 Homemade Remade Elvis Costello Songs (2008)
- "Paradise by the Dashboard Light" (2011) [4-way split 7-inch single/Meat Loaf cover with Huggabroomstik, Schwervon!, and The Leader]
- "It's the Most Wonderful Time of the Year" (2013) [Justin Remer solo digital single, using the Elastic No-No Band name]
- Phoning It In on Valentine's Day, 2008 (2020)

=== Compilation Appearances ===
- Poultrygeist: Night of the Chicken Dead soundtrack album (2006) - "Lone Gay Man's Last Words"
- Anticomp Folkilation (2007) - "Sally's Strut"
