= Brook Pridemore =

Brook Pridemore (born in 1979 in Detroit, Michigan, United States) is a New York City–based songwriter, performer, and lead vocalist. Their early work is affiliated with the antifolk movement. They've released five albums on the Bronx-based record label Crafty Records, and was responsible for co-producing the much acclaimed Anticomp Folkilation album which has since become an underground cult hit.

== Biography ==
A regular contributor to numerous other compilations, Brook Pridemore shared a split 7-inch with Ghost Mice for Plan-It-X Records. According to the music review blog Earbuddy.net, their highly anticipated fifth album, Gory Details, was released in late 2014. It includes the singles “Listening to TPM”, featuring Joseph Michelini of New Jersey indie/folk rock act River City Extension, and "Celestial Heaven". "Celestial Heaven" was picked up by Reug Vision, Inc / World Live Music & Distribution and debuted on VEVO in June 2013. Following the release of the record, Pridemore began touring consistently as well as playing in and around New York City near monthly.

Having lived in Kalamazoo, Michigan, for years doing backyard shows and working dead-end jobs to pay for musical endeavors, Brook was known to sing about the things friends did, or that they saw while hanging out downtown, just for something to do.

Pridemore has toured the United States numerous times, then embarked on their first European tour in the fall of 2009. Due to experience playing many house shows on tour, Pridemore and their roommates were inspired to turn their own apartment into a performing venue for local antifolk acts and touring bands; they called it the Brooklyn Tea Party. January 2010 saw the commencement of the Multinational Perspiration Tour, an undertaking on which Pridemore with tandem partners including The Hit and Miss Engines, Doug Cote, Liv Carrow, Crazy and the Brains and Father, Son and Holy Smokes, performed across the US, Canada, and various European countries before the tour ended in New York on June 19, 2010.

From 2010–14, Pridemore laid low in their adopted hometown of Brooklyn, New York. A fifth album, Gory Details, the self-described "album about sex", was recorded in summer 2011. The album remained unreleased until July 2015. On November 11, 2011, Pridemore played a ninety-minute solo set at New York's Sidewalk Cafe. The set included songs from all Brook Pridemore albums, and was released on cassette under the title My Name Is Brook Pridemore, And I Live In Brooklyn, NY. This live album also marked the incorporation of Pridemore's own record label, Brook Pridemore Industries.

Pridemore took a community-centric approach to their 2026 album Only I Can Prevent Forest Fires, which features performances from local Brooklyn musicians and Pat Schneeweis.

Pridemore is non-binary and uses singular they pronouns.

== Discography ==
=== Albums ===
- Metal and Wood Crafty Records (2003)
- First Name, Last Name Crafty Records (2004)
- The Reflecting Skin Crafty Records (2006)
- Brook Pridemore Sings Greatest Antifolk Hits Crafty Records (2007)
- A Brighter Light Crafty Records (2009)
- 'My Name Is Brook Pridemore, And I Live In Brooklyn, NY Brook Pridemore Industries (2014)
- Gory Details Brook Pridemore Industries (2015)
- Breakup Songs, With Horns Brook Pridemore Industries (2017)
- Metal Is My Only Friend Brook Pridemore Industries (2018)
- The Book of Pridemore Brook Pridemore Industries (2020)
- Glad to be Alive Brook Pridemore Industries (2022)
- Only I Can Prevent Forest Fires Brook Pridemore Industries (2026)

=== EPs ===
- Trve Grind Brook Pridemore Industries (2021)

=== Compilations ===
- After Hours: A Tribute To The Music Of Lou Reed (2003) – "After Hours"
- Hurry Home Early: The Songs of Warren Zevon (2005) – "Life'll Kill Ya"
- Art Star Sounds Compilation (2005) – "Figure 8"
- The Three-Dollar Gallon Compilation (2006) – "Chocolate Cake City", "Hurricane Ivan (Live)", "The Stevie B. Challenge"
- Anticomp Folkilation (2007) – "Sugar Coma (Snakes on My Brain)"
- Thanks for the Floor (2008) – "The Baptist Crutch"
- Acoustic A.D.-An Acoustic Tribute to the Misfits (2008) – "Last Caress"
- Ghost Mice/Brook Pridemore split 7-inch (2008) – "Fake Brains", "A Palm Tree On The Beach At Coney Island"
- The State I'm In (2009) – "Inauguration Day"
- Chevaliers de la Table Basse : la compile #4 (2010) – "Disappearing Reappearing Ink"
- The Bushwick Book Club Volume I (2010) – "Gave Us Barrabas"
- BTP Vol. 1 Live at the Brooklyn Tea Party – "Celestial Heaven or Leap of Faith"
- Ain't I Folk? Weemayk Music Covers Antifolk Classics (2021) – "Low and Wet"
