= Frog in Boiling Water =

Studio album by DIIV
- Released: May 24, 2024
- Genre: Shoegaze
- Length: 43:08
- Label: Fantasy
- Producer: Chris Coady

DIIV chronology
Deceiver (2019)	Frog in Boiling Water (2024)	Zirp! (2026)

Singles from Frog in Boiling Water
- 1. "Brown Paper Bag" Released: February 15, 2024; 2. "Soul-net" Released: March 4, 2024; 3. "Everyone Out" Released: March 26, 2024; 4. "Frog in Boiling Water" Released: April 23, 2024; 5. "Raining on Your Pillow" Released: May 20, 2024

Frog in Boiling Water is the fourth studio album by American indie rock band DIIV, released on May 24, 2024, through Fantasy Records. It was produced by Chris Coady and preceded by the release of five singles: lead single "Brown Paper Bag", "Soul-net", "Everyone Out", "Frog in Boiling Water", and the final single, "Raining on Your Pillow". The album received positive reviews from critics.

== Background ==
The band described Frog in Boiling Water as "more or less a collection of snapshots from various angles of our modern condition which we think highlights what this collapse looks like and, more particularly, what it feels like". The title is taken from Daniel Quinn's 1996 novel The Story of B.

== Critical reception ==
Professional ratings
Aggregate scores
Source	Rating
Metacritic	79/100
Review scores
Source	Rating
Clash	9/10
DIY	4.5/5 stars
Exclaim!	7/10
Pitchfork	7.5/10
Spin	B+
Uncut	8/10

Frog in Boiling Water received a score of 79 out of 100 on review aggregator Metacritic based on 14 reviews, which the website categorized as "Generally favorable reviews". Stereogum named it album of the week, with the site's Michael Tedder calling it "their most mature and best album, a sign that this is a band in it for the long haul", as well as the band's "most effortlessly beautiful record yet". Uncut called it "a beautiful-sounding record with tracks like 'Somber the Drums' and 'Everyone Out' providing moments of tender poppy beauty amid the general sense of decay".

Joe Goggins of DIY called the album "a highly conceptual and quietly furious piece that sifts through the wreckage of post-truth politics with disarming incision as well as "thrilling and thoughtful". Clash's Matthew Mclister found it to be "gloomier, even moodier and even more beautiful than their last" and that it "makes for a fascinating listen". Reviewing the album for Pitchfork, Ashley Bardhan described it as a "sour new album coping with capitalism. Its chiffon layers of reverb wrap around the guitars like a burial cloth, and Smith accepts the boat ride down to purgatory in distant vocals".

Spin's Eli Enis wrote that "DIIV have once again shrewdly adapted, pivoting away from the chonky riffs of Deceiver and delivering the most tense, subtle, and cerebral music of their whole career". Marko Djurdjic of Exclaim! felt that although Frog in Boiling Water contains some of the band's "most sincere, affecting writing, it's also somewhat inert: almost all of the songs have a similar mid-tempo drive that causes much of the first half to blend, which makes for a consistent yet somewhat monotonous listen".

== Track listing ==
All tracks are written by Andrew Bailey, Benjamin Newman, Colin Caulfield, and Zachary Cole Smith.

Frog in Boiling Water track listing
No.	Title	Length
1.	"In Amber"	4:08
2.	"Brown Paper Bag"	4:25
3.	"Raining on Your Pillow"	3:53
4.	"Frog in Boiling Water"	3:57
5.	"Everyone Out"	4:52
6.	"Reflected"	3:36
7.	"Somber the Drums"	3:58
8.	"Little Birds"	4:21
9.	"Soul-net"	4:24
10.	"Fender on the Freeway"	5:34
Total length:		43:08

== Personnel ==
DIIV

- Andrew Bailey – guitar, programming
- Ben Newman – drums, programming, synthesizer
- Colin Caulfield – vocals, bass guitar, programming, synthesizer
- Zachary Cole Smith – vocals, guitar, programming, synthesizer

Technical

- Chris Coady – production, mixing
- Howie Weinberg – mastering
- David Tolomei – engineering
- Chaz Sexton – engineering assistance

== Charts ==
Chart performance for Frog in Boiling Water
Chart (2024)	Peak position
Belgian Albums (Ultratop Flanders)	105
Scottish Albums (Official Charts)	51
UK Album Downloads (Official Charts)	46
