= Zachary Cole Smith =

American singer

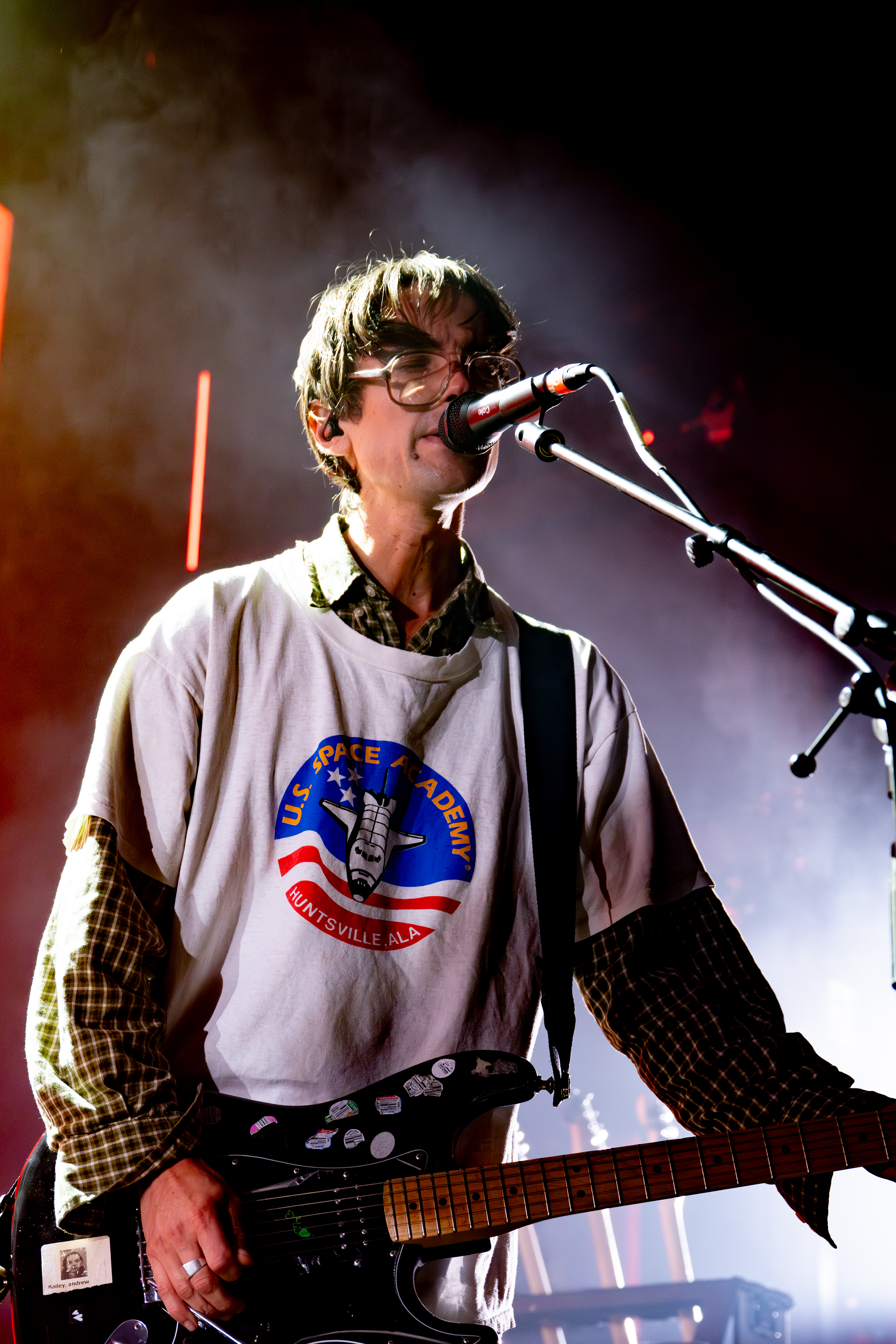
- Smith performing with DIIV, London, September 2025

Background information
- Born: November 7, 1984 (age 41); New York City, U.S.
- Genres: Shoegaze; indie rock; post-punk; dream pop
- Occupations: Musician; singer-songwriter; model; music video director
- Instruments: Vocals; guitar; bass; drums
- Years active: 2009–present
- Label: Captured Tracks
- Member of: DIIV
- Formerly of: Soft Black; Beach Fossils; Darwin Deez
- Website: diivnyc.tumblr.com

Zachary Cole Smith (born November 7, 1984) is an American musician best known for being the founder, frontman, and principal songwriter of the indie rock band DIIV. Previously, he played in the bands Soft Black and Beach Fossils. Initially called Dive, the band started as Smith's solo recording project. Smith released his debut studio album with DIIV, Oshin, in 2012, which combined elements of krautrock, post-punk and shoegaze. He has directed music videos for DIIV and Sky Ferreira. Outside of his work in the music industry, Smith has modeled for Saint Laurent on multiple occasions. DIIV's second studio album, Is the Is Are, was released on February 5, 2016. On October 4, 2019, DIIV's third album, Deceiver, was released on Captured Tracks. On May 24, 2024, DIIV released their fourth album, "Frog in Boiling Water", to critical acclaim.

== Early life and education ==
Smith was born in New York City on November 7, 1984. His father Zack Smith is a musician, songwriter, and founder of the band Scandal. His mother, Deborah E. MacIntyre, was a fashion editor for Vogue magazine.

Smith has played guitar since he was a small child. He started a short-lived band with future DIIV bandmate Andrew Bailey in high school. At the time, he considered music more of a hobby than a calling.

Smith had disciplinary problems as a teenager and was often suspended during middle school. As a freshman in high school, he and his friend threw rocks at truck windows in a Wal-Mart parking lot in the pursuit of cigarettes. Both boys were arrested, and Smith was expelled from school. He attended six different schools in five years, including St. Luke's School and The Beekman School. Smith graduated from Wooster School in Danbury, Connecticut. In 2004, he enrolled at Hampshire College to study music and film. He did not graduate.

== Career ==
After leaving Hampshire College, Smith worked construction and landscaping jobs in Northampton. In New York City, he worked at Angelica Kitchen, an East Village vegan restaurant established in the 1970s. He became involved with New York's underground music scene through the artists and musicians that frequented the restaurant. In an interview with The Fader, he said “It was just something I knew how to do.” He began playing guitar in Soft Black around 2009, and after meeting Dustin Payseur he played drums for Beach Fossils in several gigs. He left Beach Fossils to travel for a year and rejoined in 2010 as a guitar player for the band's tour. Smith also played guitar on tour with the indie band Darwin Deez.

Smith started focusing on writing music in 2010. In the summer of 2011, he booked a show for a new band he called Dive and asked Andrew Bailey, Devin Ruben Perez and Colby Hewitt to join. The group renamed themselves DIIV, were signed by Captured Tracks, and released several singles. DIIV released their debut album Oshin in 2012. Smith co-directed the music video for "Doused", which was released in September 2012.

Smith directed the music video for Sky Ferreira's song "Omanko", which was released in December 2014. In May 2015, Smith was featured in an episode of Noisey's "Under the Influence" series detailing the influence of krautrock on contemporary music. DIIV released their second studio album, Is the Is Are, on February 5, 2016. DIIV's third album, Deceiver, was released October 4, 2019.

=== Modeling ===
Smith was signed by Re:Quest Model Management in the summer of 2013, and along with Cara Delevingne, was photographed by Hedi Slimane for Saint Laurent's Fall 2013 campaign. In June, he walked in Saint Laurent's spring 2014 menswear fashion show during Paris Fashion Week. Smith walked in Saint Laurent's Spring 2016 menswear runway show in June 2015.

== Musical style and influences ==
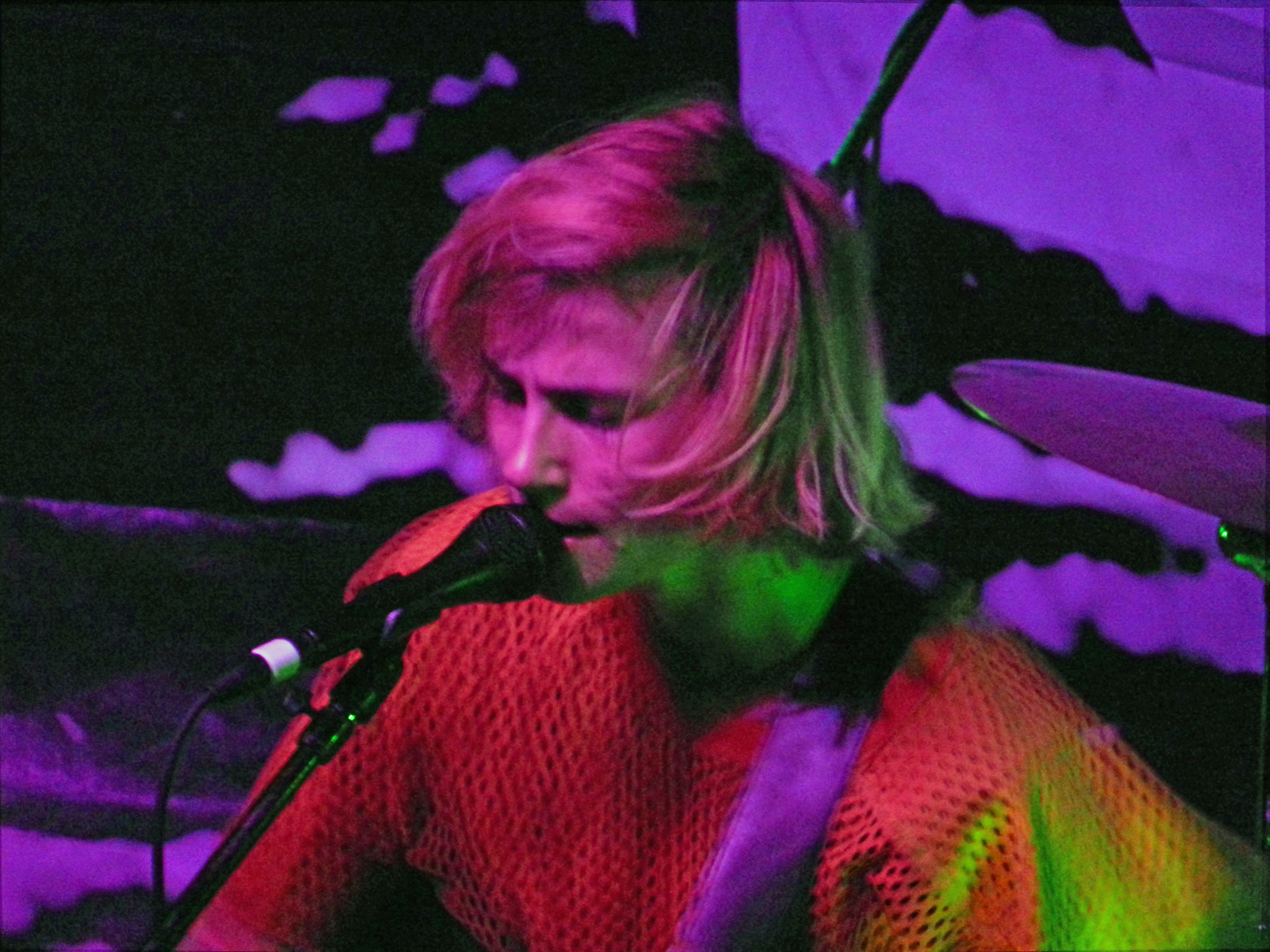
Smith performing with DIIV in San Francisco in 2013

Smith's work with DIIV has been described as krautrock, post-punk and shoegaze.

Smith's favorite albums include Arthur Russell's Love Is Overtaking Me (2008), Red Krayola's The Parable of Arable Land (1967) and Faust's The Faust Tapes (1973). The songs on Oshin were influenced by German psychedelic bands such as Kluster, La Düsseldorf, Neu! and Can. Additionally, Smith cited Nirvana and world music as sources of inspiration. According to Smith, Is the Is Are was influenced by Elliott Smith and Royal Trux.

== Personal life ==
Smith was in a relationship with singer and model Sky Ferreira. On September 13, 2013, the night before DIIV was scheduled to perform at the music festival Basilica Soundscape in Hudson, New York, Smith’s unregistered Ford pickup truck was pulled over in the nearby town of Saugerties and police found "42 decks" of heroin on him as well as ecstasy on Ferreira. Smith was charged with "two counts of criminal possession of a controlled substance, one count of possession of stolen property and one count of aggravated unlicensed driving, all misdemeanors". Additionally, he was charged with "violations of unregistered motor vehicle, driving without insurance, unlicensed driver, and having an inadequate exhaust system". He was ordered to go to rehab for 11 days in January 2014.

Smith is a vegan. He lived in Catskill, New York before returning to New York City in 2015.

On February 3, 2017, Smith announced he was checking in for "long-haul" inpatient treatment.

On February 9, 2020, Smith married his girlfriend Dani Nelson. The ceremony was held at the Bob Baker Marionette Theater in Highland Park, CA. The ceremony was attended by their families and close friends, including members of DIIV, Beach Fossils, Deafheaven, Mac Demarco, and Launder. Andrew Bailey, current guitarist for DIIV and whom Smith has been best friends with since they were 13, served as Smith's best man.

In January 2025 Smith lost his Altadena house to the 2025 Eaton Fire.

== Bands ==
- Soft Black (guitarist 2009)
- Beach Fossils (drummer 2010, guitarist 2011–2012)
- Darwin Deez (guitarist 2010)
- DIIV (guitarist, vocals 2011–present)
- Launder (live guitarist 2019)

== Discography ==
with DIIV

- Oshin (2012)
- Is the Is Are (2016)
- Deceiver (2019)
- Frog in Boiling Water (2024)
- ZIRP! (2026)

with Launder

- Pink Cloud EP (2018)
- Powder/Chew single (2019)
