= Is the Is Are =

Studio album by DIIV
- Released: February 5, 2016
- Recorded: 2015
- Studios: Strange Weather Recording Studio; The Bunker Studio (Williamsburg, Brooklyn)
- Genres: Indie rock; shoegaze; dream pop; krautrock; post-punk revival; alternative rock
- Length: 63:20
- Label: Captured Tracks
- Producer: Zachary Cole Smith

DIIV chronology
Oshin (2012)	Is the Is Are (2016)	Deceiver (2019)

Singles from Is the Is Are
- 1. "Dopamine" Released: September 16, 2015; 2. "Bent (Roi's Song)" Released: November 4, 2015; 3. "Under the Sun" Released: December 14, 2015; 4. "Is the Is Are" Released: January 21, 2016

Is the Is Are is the second studio album by American indie rock band DIIV, released on February 5, 2016 on Captured Tracks. Self-produced by vocalist and guitarist Zachary Cole Smith, the album was recorded at Strange Weather Recording Studio and The Bunker, in Williamsburg, Brooklyn. It was preceded by the singles, "Dopamine", "Bent (Roi's Song)", "Under the Sun" and "Is the Is Are".

Work on Is the Is Are began in 2013, a year following the release of the band's debut album, Oshin (2012). Its recording, however, was plagued by various factors, including, failed recording sessions with Girls' Chet "JR" White; Smith's drug addiction and eventual arrest; controversy surrounding online remarks made by bass guitarist Devin Ruben Perez; and the eventual departure of drummer Colby Hewitt, due to his own drug addiction.

== Background ==
"I know I have to stay alive at least until the album's done. This is one shot at immortality, if I ever have one. I know it's by far the most important thing I'll ever do. That's very empowering, no matter what fucked-up shit is going on. Every day is a struggle, but I have to be the best I can, stay sober and finish this record."

— Smith in June 2015

In 2013, while touring in support of the band's debut studio album, Oshin (2012), vocalist, guitarist and primary songwriter Smith canceled the band's planned European tour, citing exhaustion and a desire to work on new DIIV material: "As an artist, the biggest, most important reason for me to do this is to write and create. That then becomes the thing that falls by the wayside because you have to keep all this other stuff going." Initially writing and recording with former Girls bassist Chet "JR" White, in San Francisco, Smith noted: "I've been writing a ton of stuff, in bizarre different circumstances. It feels like the last year has been the most insane of my life so far, moving around, being on tour and doing a lot of writing in different scenarios. The music coming out of it has been pretty bizarre."

The sessions with White, however, proved unsuccessful, with Smith stating: "I had these glorified ideas about San Francisco and its drug culture. I thought inspiration would just hit me and I would get these San Francisco drugs in my system and all of a sudden an amazing record would come out. But that's not really what happened at all. We sat down in a studio and, instead of picking up a guitar and having some beautiful thing come out, I just had no idea what the fuck I was doing there and gave up before I even started."

Shortly after, on September 13, 2013, Smith and his girlfriend Sky Ferreira were arrested "on misdemeanor charges of criminal possession of a controlled substance," following an incident in which their car was pulled over by the police, en route to the Basilica Music Festival. Smith stated that the incident greatly influenced the writing and recording of Is the Is Are: "What happened to us was really shitty and traumatic, and it wasn’t something I did to get attention — it was the worst possible thing that could have happened at that moment. I knew it was going to take a really good album to save me. That’s what made it so hard to write, and why it took so long. If I didn’t make a great record, then I’m done. That’s it. I’m fucked." Following the arrest, Smith attended rehab, writing the song "Dopamine" in January 2014, after his release.

DIIV used a 14-date concert and festival tour throughout the United States in July 2014 as an opportunity to craft new songs. One of the new songs they performed, "Dust", was previously premiered in June 2013, in a video of the band practicing the song. At the time, DIIV's second album was set to be released between late 2014 and early 2015. Smith says he wrote around 300 songs for the album. The band rented a warehouse in Los Angeles for January and February 2015 and worked on the songs there.

== Recording ==
The bulk of Is the Is Are was recorded in March 2015 at Strange Weather Recording Studio and The Bunker Studio in Williamsburg, Brooklyn. Regarding the recording process, Smith noted: "I didn’t want it to sound slick or over produced. I wanted it to sound human and homemade. And that’s the key to this album, I wanted it to show humanity, imperfect and flawed – the album title, the way it was recorded, I wanted every element to sound human, then hopefully people can empathise with me rather than judging me."

Drummer Hewitt left the band in the spring due to his own drug addiction. Mastering of the record was completed in early July. Smith worked with three visual artists on the album art. He asked one of them to write "50 poems of nonsense words that sound profound." "Is the is are" was the last line of Smith's favorite of the poems.

The song "Is the Is Are" was written and recorded after Smith appeared in an episode of Noisey's Under the Influence series in May 2015, where he played a cover of Neu!'s song "Hallogallo". Recording the Neu! cover inspired Smith to write and record the song "Is the Is Are" and directly influenced the song.

Following the album's aborted recording sessions with White, Smith revealed his desire to continue producing the band's material himself: "We've had every modern-day producer flying at me like, 'Oh, this guy produced this band,' and it's some fucking band that I read about on Pitchfork two years ago. It's cool to get attention but, in the end, I'm a control freak and I have a very clear vision. I'm the only person who I can trust to produce this record."

== Composition ==
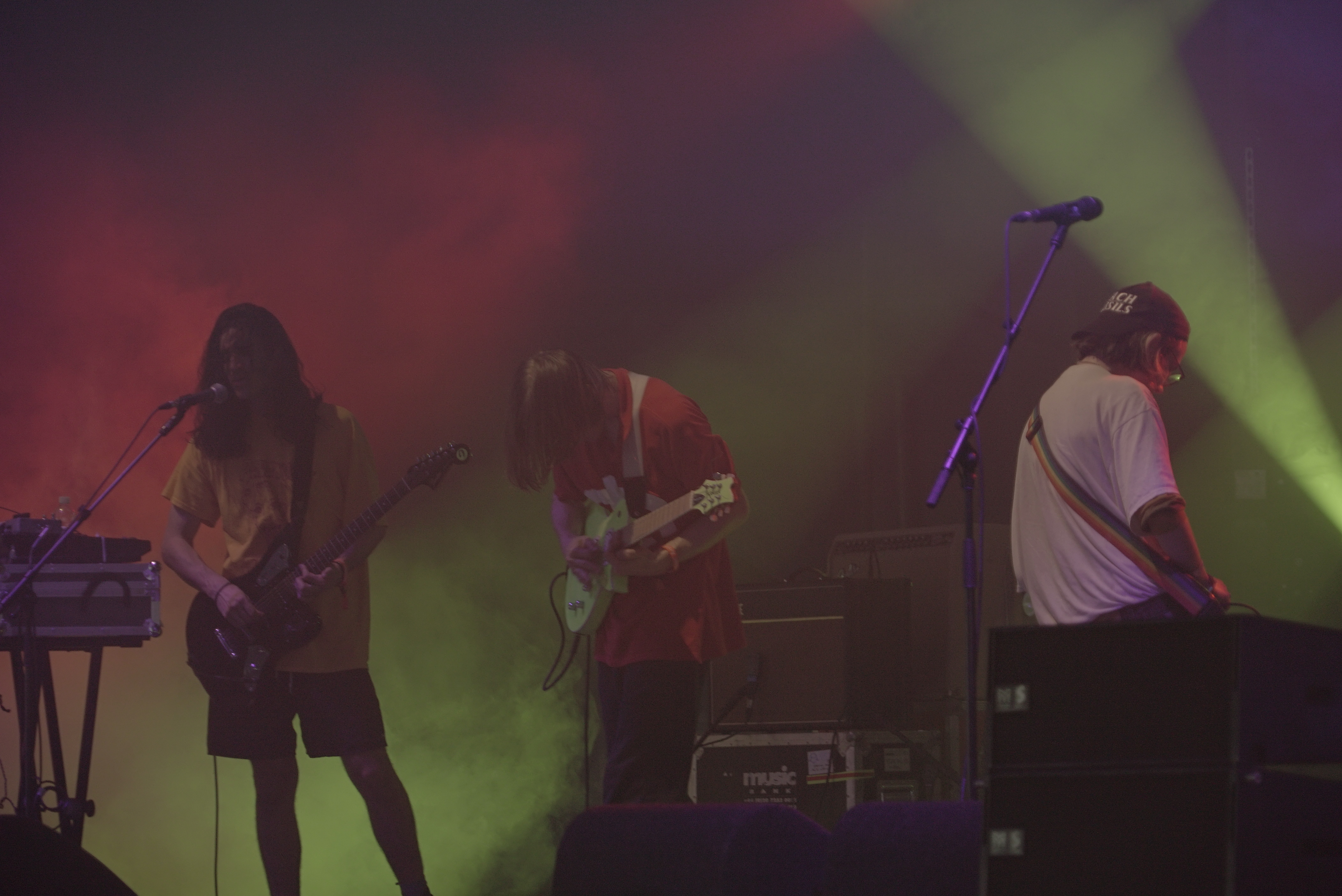
DIIV performing at Field Day 2016.

According to Smith, the album was inspired by his experiences since the release of Oshin, including his arrest for drug possession as well as the following media scrutiny he and Ferreira endured. DIIV intended to explore rock music in new ways, with Smith saying: "We're making non-traditional choices when it comes to rock music. Rock is so thoroughly explored in every way; I still think there's room to make it interesting. That guitar-based DIIV sound is still there, but we've expanded its parameters."

In 2013, during the early stages of writing Is the Is Are, Smith identified Elliott Smith and Royal Trux as his then-primary influences: "There's a huge influence that I really wanna establish on the record: Elliott Smith. On the first record, we kind of eschewed pop structure – it was much more influenced by German psychedelic bands like Kluster, La Düsseldorf, Neu! or Can. But listening to Elliott has brought me into pop structure – verses and choruses and pre-choruses – stuff that I never really found interesting before. Also, I'm inspired by Royal Trux's Accelerator and their self-titled record – there's something so chaotic about it."

== Release and promotion ==
DIIV announced they would play a large portion of the album at an April 28, 2015 show at Baby's All Right in New York City, and continued to perform mostly new material in North America and Europe during the summer of 2015. A total of 23 further North American tour dates were planned for October and November, supported by Sunflower Bean and No Joy.

The first single from the album, "Dopamine", was released on September 16. On November 4, they shared the track "Bent (Roi's Song)". They also announced the album's final release date of February 5, 2016, and shared the track listing as well as the album art. The album was given an exclusive pre-release stream via The Guardian on January 29, 2016.

== Critical reception ==
Professional ratings
Aggregate scores
Source	Rating
Metacritic	72/100
Review scores
Source	Rating
Drowned in Sound	7/10
The Guardian	4/5 stars
NME	4/5 stars
Pitchfork	8.1/10
Spin	8/10

Is the Is Are received mostly positive reviews from contemporary music critics. At Metacritic, which assigns a normalized rating out of 100 to reviews from mainstream critics, the album received an average score of 72, based on 24 reviews, which indicates "generally favorable reviews".

Writing for Pitchfork, Ian Cohen gave the album a positive review, praising its scope and lyrical content: "Is the Is Are doesn’t engage in fantasy or open up new worlds — it builds a nearly impenetrable wall around the self. Call it Requiem for a Dream-pop, dedicated to a gorgeous yet unglamorous portrayal of addiction." In another positive review for The Guardian, Tim Jonze praised the album's length and style, writing: "At first it can seem too reliant on one style and, like many a double album, in need of an edit. Then you realise that overindulgence is half the point here. DIIV are demanding complete sonic immersion, and providing the listener with ample opportunities to lose themselves."

In another highly positive review, NME's Ben Homewood wrote: "[The album] ends after 64 minutes with "Waste of Breath", which kicks from slow rumble into shoegaze wig out, steered expertly by Cole’s hammering guitar. Its final note lingers, leaving the impression Is The Is Are could be DIIV's definitive statement. Forget all the baggage, this is just a band in a room, and the noise they make is thrilling." Drowned in Sound's Dom Gourlay praised the album despite its difficult gestation period: "Is The Is Are is a far better record than anyone could have expected it to be. A welcome return, and one that hopefully signals a healthier and less troublesome existence in the future."

=== Accolades ===
Publication	Accolade	Year	Rank
NME	NME's Albums of the Year 2016	2016	7
Pitchfork	Readers' Top 50 Albums 2016	2016	41

== Track listing ==
All tracks are written by Zachary Cole Smith.

No.	Title	Length
1.	"Out of Mind"	3:08
2.	"Under the Sun"	3:47
3.	"Bent (Roi's Song)"	5:40
4.	"Dopamine"	3:55
5.	"Blue Boredom (Sky's Song)" (featuring Sky Ferreira)	2:33
6.	"Valentine"	3:17
7.	"Yr Not Far"	3:19
8.	"Take Your Time"	4:58
9.	"Is the Is Are"	3:08
10.	"Mire (Grant's Song)"	5:34
11.	"Incarnate Devil"	4:42
12.	"(Fuck)"	0:16
13.	"Healthy Moon"	4:11
14.	"Loose Ends"	3:12
15.	"(Napa)"	1:44
16.	"Dust"	4:34
17.	"Waste of Breath"	5:22
Total length:		63:20

== Personnel ==
=== DIIV ===
- Zachary Cole Smith – vocals, guitars, bass guitar, drums (12 and 15)
- Devin Ruben Perez – bass guitar (4, 14 and 16)
- Ben Wolf – drums
- Colby Hewitt – drums (4, 14, 16 and 17)
- Colin Caulfield – drums (3), harmony arrangements (4, 9 and 11)

=== Additional musicians ===
- Sky Ferreira – vocals (5)

=== Recording personnel ===
- Zachary Cole Smith – producer, mixing
- Daniel Schlett – recording, additional mixing
- Kurt Feldman – additional mixing, additional recording (10), mixing (10)
- Jacob Portrait – mixing (15)
- Alex DeTurk – mastering

=== Artwork ===
- Joji Nakamura – artwork
- Bizaroïds (Frederick Deming) – artwork
- Hayato Kiyuna – artwork
- Hidemasa Miyake – photography
- Zachary Cole Smith – art arrangements
- Ryan McCardle – art arrangements
- Pam – art arrangements
- Will – art arrangements

== Charts ==
Chart (2016)	Peak position
Belgian Albums (Ultratop Flanders)	86
Belgian Albums (Ultratop Wallonia)	184
Dutch Albums (Album Top 100)	92
Swiss Albums (Schweizer Hitparade)	83
US Billboard 200	81
