= Oshin (album) =

Studio album by DIIV
- Released: June 26, 2012
- Recorded: 2011–2012
- Genre: Dream pop
- Length: 40:16
- Label: Captured Tracks
- Producer: Zachary Cole Smith

DIIV chronology
Oshin (2012)	Is the Is Are (2016)

Oshin is the debut studio album by American rock band DIIV, released on June 26, 2012, by Captured Tracks. The album was produced by frontman Zachary Cole Smith.

== Composition ==
Regarding the album's aesthetic and lyrical content, in comparison to its follow-up, Is the Is Are (2016), frontman Zachary Cole Smith reflected: "[Oshin] was hiding a bit behind an image, behind a sound – the vocals being really textural, and a sort of ambient thing. I didn't want it to be about me as a person. The lyrics were almost like universal truths, not personal."

== Release ==
In 2014, Oshin was briefly out of print due to legal issues regarding the original cover art. It was reissued in June 2015 with new artwork.

== Reception ==
Professional ratings
Aggregate scores
Source	Rating
AnyDecentMusic?	7.5/10
Metacritic	80/100
Review scores
Source	Rating
AllMusic	3.5/5 stars
The A.V. Club	B+
The Boston Phoenix	4/4 stars
Entertainment Weekly	B+
The Guardian	3/5 stars
NME	9/10
The Observer	3/5 stars
Pitchfork	8.3/10
Spin	7/10
Uncut	8/10

Critic Ian Cohen of Pitchfork said, "Oshin isn't just a gorgeous and unusually melodic dream pop record; it's an interesting experiment in whether a band based on voice/guitar/bass/drums can rely on the guitar to carry the song's meaning".

On lists of the top 50 albums of 2012, Oshin was listed 22nd by Stereogum and 40th by Pitchfork. In 2018, Pitchfork listed Oshin at number 26 on its list of the 30 best dream pop albums.

== Track listing ==
All tracks written and produced by Zachary Cole Smith.

No.	Title	Length
1.	"(Druun)"	2:07
2.	"Past Lives"	2:21
3.	"Human"	2:57
4.	"Air Conditioning"	4:30
5.	"How Long Have You Known?"	3:33
6.	"Wait"	3:15
7.	"Earthboy"	3:14
8.	"(Druun Pt. II)"	2:46
9.	"Follow"	2:45
10.	"Sometime"	3:05
11.	"Oshin (Subsume)"	3:32
12.	"Doused"	3:42
13.	"Home"	2:29
Total length:		40:16

iTunes Store bonus tracks
No.	Title	Length
14.	"Geist"	4:45
15.	"Bambi Slaughter"	2:50
Total length:		47:51

== Personnel ==
Credits adapted from the liner notes of Oshin.

=== DIIV ===
- Devin Ruben Perez
- Andrew Bailey
- Zachary Cole Smith
- Colby Hewitt III

=== Additional musicians ===
- Ben Wolf (Ben Newman) – drums (tracks 1, 8, 11, 12)

=== Technical ===
- Daniel James Schlett – recording, mixing
- Nico Testa – engineering assistance
- Zachary Cole Smith – production

=== Artwork ===
- Kiakshuk – cover illustration
- Kopapik Qaqyuarqyuk – back cover illustration
- Simeonie Kopapik – liner illustration
- Sandy Kim – band photo

== Charts ==
Chart performance for Oshin
Chart (2012)	Peak position
UK Record Store Albums (OCC)	27
US Top Current Albums (Billboard)	158
US Heatseekers Albums (Billboard)	5
US Independent Albums (Billboard)	33
