= Deceiver (DIIV album) =

Studio album by DIIV
- Released: October 4, 2019
- Recorded: March 2019
- Studios: 64 Sound (Los Angeles, California)
- Genres: Shoegaze; grunge; slowcore
- Length: 44:28
- Label: Captured Tracks
- Producers: DIIV; Sonny Diperri

DIIV chronology
Is the Is Are (2016)	Deceiver (2019)	Frog in Boiling Water (2024)

Singles from Deceiver
- 1. "Skin Game" Released: July 24, 2019; 2. "Taker" Released: August 22, 2019; 3. "Blankenship" Released: September 18, 2019

Deceiver is the third studio album by American indie rock band DIIV. It was released on October 4, 2019 by Captured Tracks. Produced primarily by the band themselves along with producer Sonny Diperri (My Bloody Valentine, Nine Inch Nails), the album was recorded in Los Angeles in March 2019.

This album is the follow-up to 2016's critically acclaimed Is the Is Are. It is also DIIV's first project since frontman Zachary Cole Smith checked himself into "long-haul inpatient treatment" for substance abuse in 2017. Smith's treatment and recovery period are said to have played an important part in the making of Deceiver. The band has described Deceiver as "the soundtrack to personal resurrection under the heavy weight of metallic catharsis".

Upon release, Deceiver reached number 177 on the US Billboard 200 and received critical acclaim as a drastic departure from DIIV's earlier work.

== Background ==
Amidst turmoil and controversy, DIIV released the critical and fan favorite Is the Is Are in 2016 following 2012's Oshin. Praise came from The Guardian, Spin, and more. NME ranked it in the top ten of their Albums of the Year. Pitchfork's audience voted Is the Is Are one of the Top 50 Albums of 2016 as the outlet dubbed it, "gorgeous".

The release was followed by a February tour in Australia as part of St Jerome's Laneway Festival. However, just two days prior to the release, on February 3, Smith announced he was checking in for "long-haul" inpatient treatment. On March 26, 2016, the Liverpool venue Arts Club, which DIIV was scheduled to perform at on March 27, announced that the remainder of DIIV's European tour was canceled "due to an urgent health issue", which was later confirmed by DIIV's representatives. In an interview with NME in October 2019, bassist Colin Caulfield commented on this period in the band's career, "It definitely felt like an end point... I had tried really hard to be as supportive as possible for a long time. It was a hands up moment, it was the type of realization Cole had to come to himself. And he did, which is great."

This period also saw the band take part in very occasional interviews with the media, with the band remaining relatively out of the public eye more than ever. Throughout 2016-2018 DIIV released a vast selection of cover songs, with the group performing songs by Elliott Smith, Cat Power, Sparklehorse and (Sandy) Alex G and My Bloody Valentine. Later in 2017, DIIV also parted ways with bassist Devin Ruben Perez after earlier controversy arose from the revelation that Perez had posted anti-Semitic, racist, homophobic, and sexist comments on 4chan.

In the aftermath of Cole’s personal struggles, he "finally accepted what it means to go through treatment and committed," emerging with a renewed focus and perspective. Getting back together with the band in Los Angeles would result in a series of firsts. This would be the first time DIIV wrote and recorded a record as a band with bassist Colin Caulfield bringing in demos, writing alongside Cole, and the entire band contributing to the songwriting process of every song. In an interview, Colin explained the writing process, "Cole and I approached writing vocal melodies the same way the band approached the instrumentals," says Colin. "We threw ideas at the wall for months on end, slowly making sense of everything. It was a constant conversation about the parts we liked best versus which of them served the album best."

== Composition ==
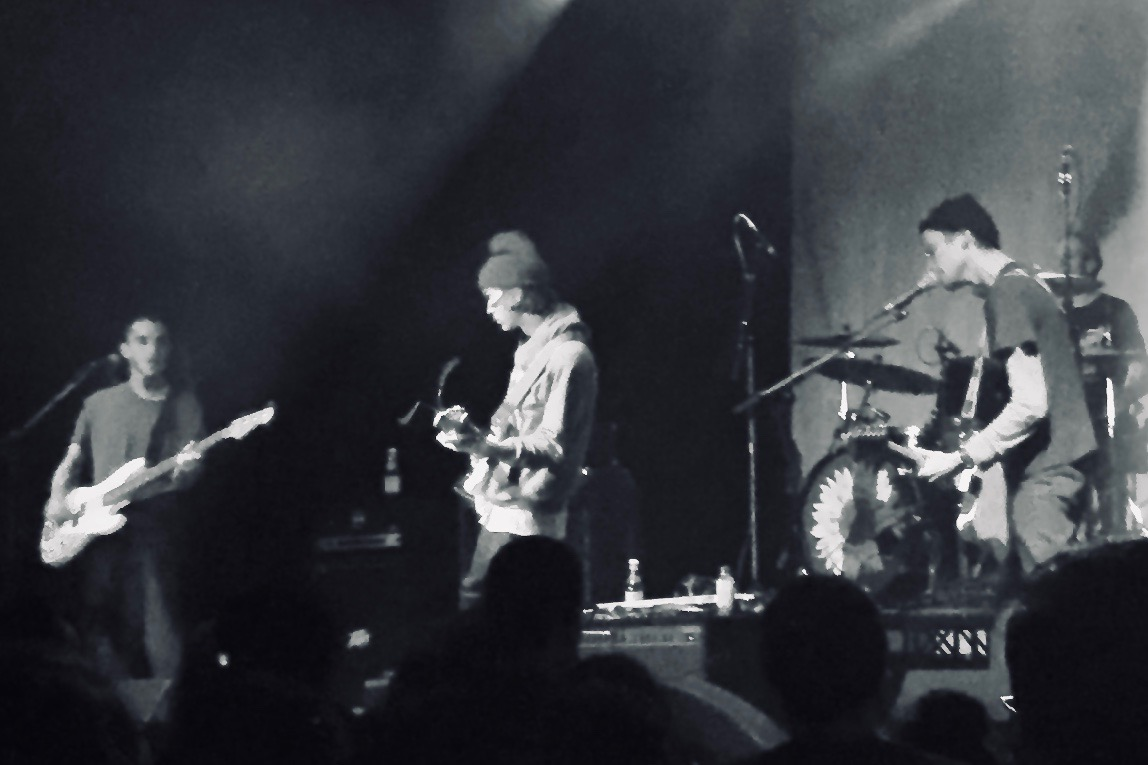
DIIV at Fete Music Hall in Providence, RI November 2018 while on tour with Deafheaven

Speaking on the inspiration behind the concept, recording, and direction of their third album, Smith has said "I've known everyone in the band for ten years plus separately and together as DIIV for at least the past five years... On Deceiver, I'm talking about working for the relationships in my life, repairing them, and accepting responsibility for the places I’ve failed them. I had to re-approach the band. It wasn't restarting from a clean slate, but it was a new beginning. It took time—as it did with everybody else in my life—but we all grew together and learned how to communicate and collaborate."

DIIV also arranged and refined many of the songs while on tour. During a 2018 tour with Deafheaven, they performed eight untitled brand-new compositions as the bulk of the set. "We went from playing these songs in the rehearsal space to performing them live at shows, figuring them out in real-time in front of hundreds of people, and approaching them from a broader range of reference points", said Colin. "We'd never done that before. We got to internalize how everything worked on stage. We did all of the trimming before we went to the studio. It was an exercise in simplifying what makes a song. We really learned how to listen, write, and work as a band." The band also enlisted producer Sonny Diperri, whose presence marks a step-forward for the band and has dramatically expanded the band's sonic palette, making it richer and fuller than ever before. "He brought a lot of common sense and discipline to our process," said Cole. "We'd been touring these songs and playing them for a while, so he was able to encourage us to make decisions and own them."

=== Sound and style ===
Deceiver marked a musical departure from DIIV's classic dream-pop sound heard on their first two albums, and instead consists of a noticeably heavier and darker approach both musically and lyrically. In an interview with Ben Homewood for NME, the band were asked about the shift from lighter guitars to heavier and dirtier arrangements. Zachary Cole Smith acknowledged the change in sound and songwriting mirrored the changes within the band and their own personal lives. "With a lot of the stuff we wanted to talk about [on Deceiver], themes of catharsis, deception, brutal honesty... the music had to kind of fit that. A lot of the more heavy songs, and songs that have a journey, it conveys that better, and match with that [style] a lot more." Commenting on their guitar playing and musical style from their earlier albums, Smith went on to say, "It's just not really who we are as a band anymore. I think we got pigeonholed... I just didn't want to hear anyone say the word 'beachy' anymore."

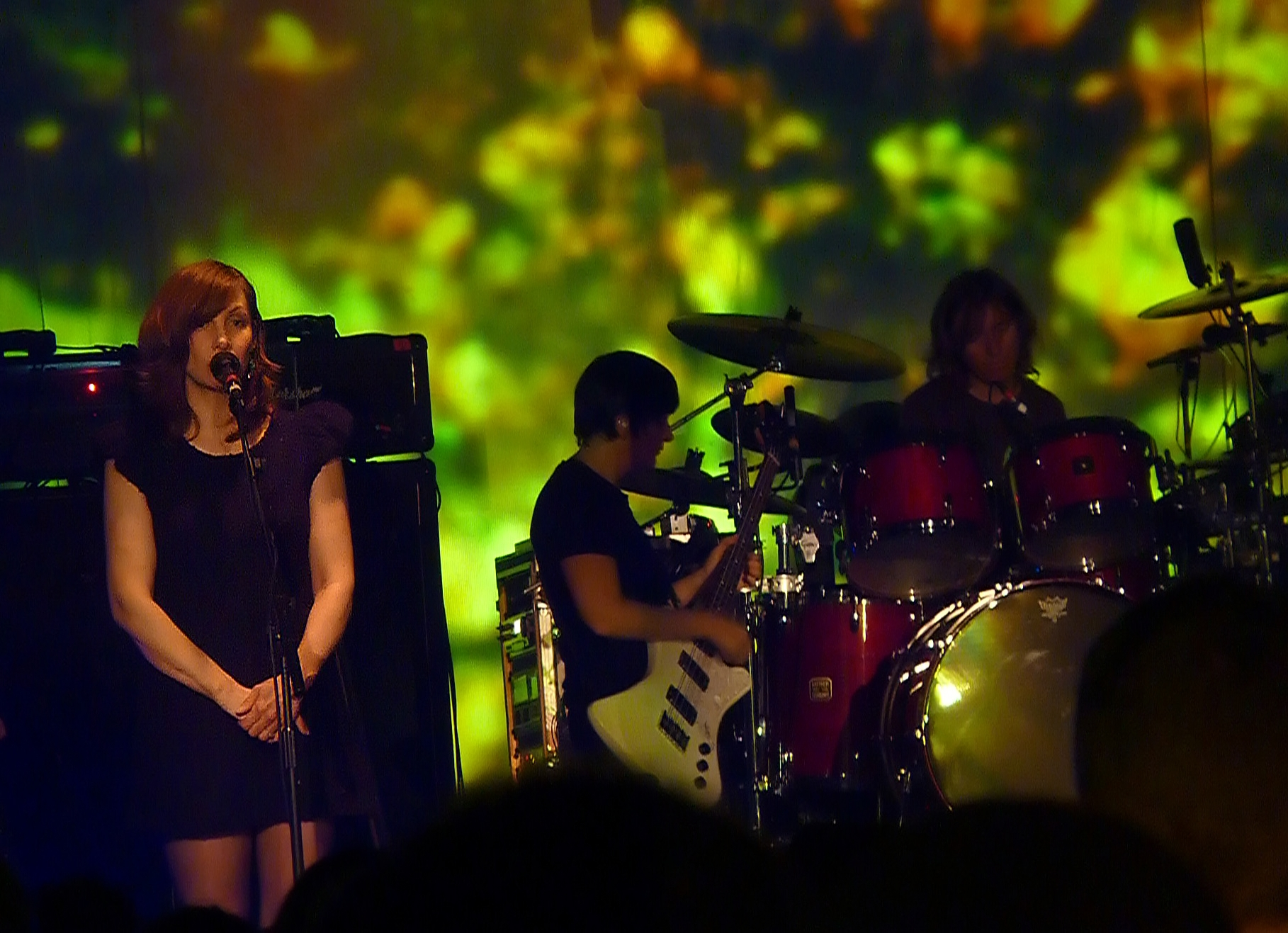
Critics compared the sound of Deceiver to the work of My Bloody Valentine (pictured here in 2009).

Many critics also pointed out the significant shoegaze influences heard on this album compared to DIIV's past releases, with some critics even citing bands such as My Bloody Valentine as having influenced the album's sound. While DIIV has occasionally been categorized as a shoegaze band, Cole Smith hasn't always agreed with such a categorization. In an interview with Ryan Reed of Relix Magazine in the spring of 2020, Smith said:

"We’ve been called a ‘shoegaze band’ ever since the beginning, and I don’t ever feel like it fit us. The more we worked on the songs [on Deceiver], the more we got feelings and textures from certain shoegaze bands that we loved. And we wanted to bring those [ideas] in for emphasis on parts. In the middle of working on the record, Sonny [Diperri] got the call to go out to Ireland and work with My Bloody Valentine. So he had a pretty intimate knowledge of how the album they were working on was made and how their previous records were made. He taught us a couple things that MBV does for some of their textures. It’s a small part of the record— we didn’t lean on it too hard. We just tried to use it where it made sense."

The lyrics, which arrived during the final writing stage, focus on deception and “personal responsibility”— raging against climate change deniers (the apocalyptic postpunk surge of “Blankenship”) and reflecting on “youthful sins” (the feedback-laced crawl of “Lorelei”).

== Release and promotion ==
After a few days of teasing via Instagram posts, the group finally announced their third album, Deceiver. It was produced by Sonny Diperri, who’s worked with acts like My Bloody Valentine, Nine Inch Nails, and Protomartyr.

The first single, titled "Skin Game", was released on July 24, 2019 through Captured Tracks. It has been well-received by critics, with Drew Novak from Paste Magazine describing the track as "An excellent first taste before the album's Oct. 4 release via Captured Tracks, mixing weighty guitar riffs and a hook of slick vocals for a cathartic peek at personal pain." Zachary Cole Smith, the band’s lead vocalist and guitarist, discussed "Skin Game" in a statement:

"It's an imaginary dialogue between two characters, which could either be myself or people I know. I spent six months in several different rehab facilities at the beginning of 2017. I was living with other addicts. Being a recovering addict myself, there are a lot of questions like, "Who are we? What is this disease?" Our last record was about recovery in general, but I truthfully didn't buy in. I decided to live in my disease instead. "Skin Game" looks at where the pain comes from. I'm looking at the personal, physical, emotional, and broader political experiences feeding into the cycle of addiction for millions of us."

— Zachary Cole Smith

The second single for Deceiver, titled "Taker", was released on August 22, 2019. Jon Blistein of Rolling Stone positively reviewed the track, writing that it "recalls classic grunge-era ballads, moving at a brooding, down-tempo pace as the drums thud and the guitars shift between a crackle and a roar. Frontman Zachary Cole Smith delivers an airy vocal performance over the heavy stomp, slipping in some deft harmonies as well as he confesses, 'Who were you to believe?/Your lying eyes or me?/I won’t let them tie to you/The shit I put you through.'" Lake Schatz for Consequence of Sound described the song as "...foggy, more shoegaze-leaning atmosphere. The mix of guitars and vocals is thick and pulsing, providing listeners a dose of disorienting comfort."

On September 18, 2019, DIIV released their first video in six years for the LP's third single, "Blankenship", directed by Sean Stout. "For a problem as global and looming as climate change, we wanted to make something very simple and claustrophobic," Stout said of the clip, via Revolver. "To me, the nightmare scenario of being trapped alone in a vast arid desert devoid of life is terrifying and hopefully captures that feeling well — as beautiful as that landscape may be." The video was filmed in various locations around California, including Trona Pinnacles and Sequoia National Park. "Blankenship" was well received by critics, with many noting its hard rock approach in contrast to their past material, which was often labeled as shoegaze or dream pop.

Deceiver was officially released on October 4, 2019 through Captured Tracks on CD, vinyl LP, and online streaming.

== Critical reception ==
Professional ratings
Aggregate scores
Source	Rating
Metacritic	81/100
Review scores
Source	Rating
DIY	4/5 stars
Exclaim!	8/10
NME	4/5 stars
Paste	8.4/10
Pitchfork	7.7/10
Q	4/5 stars

Upon its release Deceiver received acclaim from critics, with many commenting on its darker and heavier sound and lyrical themes. In his review for Q, Dave Everley praised the album, calling it "a success as both an artistic statement and a mea culpa." In a positive review, Jordan Bassett of NME wrote, "Where its predecessor was airy and spaced-out, Deceiver packs some seriously heavy riffs, sliding between monster rockers and moon-eyed grunge ballads that wouldn't sound too out of place on an early Smashing Pumpkins record."

Evan Rytlewski of Pitchfork gave the album a positive review, pointing out the album's darker and heavier themes and its various influences. Comparing it to 2016's Is The Is Are and that record's optimistic tones, Rytlewski wrote "Like its predecessor, Deceiver is a portrait of addiction and recovery, but this time it’s not quite as tidy... It plays like the last record’s darker shadow." He went one to suggest a possible influence toward the album's heavier sounds came from DIIV touring with San Francisco blackgaze band Deafheaven. "Smith spends the entire album flirting with self-hatred, dwelling on lies, guilt, and burned bridges... The lyrics wallow, but the music soars."

Hayden Goodridge of Paste magazine acknowledged frontman Zachary Cole Smith's experiences in rehab and personal demons as direct inspiration for the album's overall tone. "Cole’s experiences in rehab became the inspiration for the group's latest record, Deceiver, and while the album displays the group’s darkest sound yet, it also ends up being their most earnest." He went on to write, "Instead of another blissful smattering of lo-fi shoegaze, the songs on this record are immense—both sonically and thematically. The record's opener, "Horsehead," immediately thrusts the listener into a swirl of strumming, overdriven guitars revolving around Cole's ghostly vocals... The wider, dynamic sound texture across Deceiver is one of the most apparent improvements from past records with a clear, crisp approach that avoids sterility." Joe Goggins wrote for DIY magazine: "'Deceiver' is Cole’s first truly clear-eyed artistic statement - it's also his most mature".

Alex Hudson of Exclaim! commented on the album's grunge-inspired sound and aesthetic, comparing it positively to Nirvana's album In Utero. He wrote "Zachary Cole Smith has always cited Nirvana as a key influence: he talks about them in interviews, threw an In Utero tape in a blender in DIIV's very first video, and even looks a little bit like Kurt Cobain (at least when he grows his hair long)... All that being said, DIIV have never particularly sounded like Nirvana — until now. The band's third album incorporates the crunchy palette of grunge into their usual reverb-hazed shoegaze soundscapes." He went on to write "It's dark subject matter — which makes grunge's famously gloomy sonic palette a particularly good fit for a record that's as beautiful as it is bleak."

== Track listing ==
All tracks are written by DIIV.

Deceiver track listing
No.	Title	Length
1.	"Horsehead"	5:08
2.	"Like Before You Were Born"	3:04
3.	"Skin Game"	4:25
4.	"Between Tides"	4:43
5.	"Taker"	4:28
6.	"For the Guilty"	3:38
7.	"The Spark"	4:00
8.	"Lorelei"	3:58
9.	"Blankenship"	3:56
10.	"Acheron"	7:08
Total length:		44:28

== Personnel ==
DIIV

- Zachary Cole Smith – vocals, guitar
- Andrew Bailey – guitar
- Colin Caulfield – bass guitar, vocals
- Ben Newman – drums

Production

- Sonny Diperri – producer, mixer, engineer
- DIIV – producers, mixing, cover packaging
- Tyler Karmen – engineer
- Dave Cooley – mastering
- Davin Givhan & Larry Goetz – slide guitar on Track 8
- Rhys Lee – cover painting
- Brodie Kaman – cover packaging
- Ben Newman – back cover and label paintings
- Coley Brown – band photographer

== Charts ==
Chart performance for Deceiver
Chart (2019)	Peak position
Scottish Albums (Official Charts)	60
UK Independent Albums (Official Charts)	17
US Billboard 200	177
US Independent Albums (Billboard)	6
US Top Alternative Albums (Billboard)	19
US Top Rock Albums (Billboard)	35
