= Poultrygeist (soundtrack) =

Poultrygeist! Music From and Inspired by the Motion Picture

Soundtrack album
- Released: October 3, 2006
- Genres: Musical, hardcore punk, pop punk, ska punk
- Length: 68:51
- Labels: Troma Entertainment; Micro, Inc. Recordings
- Producer: Jeremy Howell

Poultrygeist! Music From and Inspired By the Motion Picture is the soundtrack album to the 2008 musical-comedy horror film Poultrygeist: Night of the Chicken Dead, released independently through the movie's production company Troma Entertainment on October 3, 2006.

In addition to the film's musical numbers composed by Duggie Banas, Poultrygeist's soundtrack features songs from numerous punk rock bands as well as snippets of dialogue from the film.

The CD soundtrack for Poultrygeist was released with a bonus DVD which included several behind-the-scenes featurettes, trailers, two music videos for Calimari Safari's "Poultrygeist" and the first five minutes of the film.

== Track listing ==
No.	Title	Writer(s)	Artist	Length
1.	"Poultrygeist"		Calimari Safari	3:08
2.	"You Fools, This Restaurant is Built on an Ancient Tromahawk Indian Burial Ground!" (dialogue)		Ron Jeremy	0:27
3.	"Clear"		Potshot	2:39
4.	"Bumpin' Tacos" (dialogue)		Jason Yachanin	0:10
5.	"Revenge is a Dish Best Served Fried"	Gabe Friedman, Lloyd Kaufman, Duggie Banas	Jason Yachanin	2:32
6.	"Last Words"		The Peacocks	1:54
7.	"Sensitive"		Scatterbox	1:32
8.	"Goddamn Honkies" (dialogue)		Joshua Olatunde	0:46
9.	"Slow Fast Food Love"	Gabe Friedman, Lloyd Kaufman, Duggie Banas	Jason Yachanin and Kate Graham	5:10
10.	"Red Planet"		Zombina and the Skeletones	2:39
11.	"Eat My Meat, You Vegan Whores" (dialogue)		Jason Yachanin, Allyson Sereboff and Kate Graham	0:20
12.	"Milk Milk Lemonade"		Dingleberry Dynasty	2:21
13.	"I've Set Sail"		Dan Potthast	2:29
14.	"Longing to Live / Waiting to Die"	Gabe Friedman, Duggie Banas, Jason "Shack" Kozun	Lloyd Kaufman and Jason Yachanin	2:44
15.	"Lone Gay Man's Last Words"		Elastic No-No Band	2:18
16.	"My Ass!" (dialogue)		Robin Watkins	0:28
17.	"Generous General"	Duggie Banas, Jason "Shack" Kozun	Robin Watkins, Kate Graham and Allyson Sereboff	4:56
18.	"Green Eggs and Pam"		Purple Pam	3:42
19.	"Poultrygeist"		Count Smokula	2:19
20.	"S-U-I-C-I-D-E"	Gabe Friedman, Duggie Banas	Rose Ghavami	1:42
21.	"This Isn't a Terrorist Thing!" (dialogue)		Jason Yachanin	0:17
22.	"Zombie Chickens from Tromaville"		The Nihilistics	2:21
23.	"Ghost of Chicken Past"	Robert Aldape, Shane Swenson	Thee Obscene	2:42
24.	"We Need Action!" (dialogue)		Jason Yachanin, Allyson Sereboff and Kate Graham	0:21
25.	"Drop the Bucket"		Covered in Bees	2:52
26.	"Dead as a Doornail"		Impaler	3:35
27.	"Massacre"		The Dwarves	3:07
28.	"The Chickens Have Declared Jihad on Us All" (dialogue)		Rose Ghavami	0:10
29.	"Murderous General"	Gabe Friedman, Jason "Shack" Kozun, Duggie Banas	Robin Watkins, Jason Yachanin and Kate Graham	1:25
30.	"Slow Fast Food Love (reprise)"	Gabe Friedman, Lloyd Kaufman	Baxendale	4:47
31.	"Bleed On"		The Dwarves	2:43
Total length:				68:51

=== Other songs featured in the film ===
The following is a list of songs featured in Poultrygeist but not included on the soundtrack album:

- Zombina and the Skeletones - "Staci Stasis"
- Mike Black - "Go/No-Go"
- The Faint - "Dropkick the Punks"
- Sorry About Dresden - "Sick and Sore"
- New Duncan Imperials - "Southern Comfort on the Skids"
- Amateur Death Photos - "Rock Hard Caulk"
