= Major Matt Mason =

Action figure created by Mattel

- Some figures of the series, fltr: Calisto, Sgt. Storm, Matt Mason, Jeff Long, and Doug Davis
- Product type: Action figures of astronauts, aliens, spacecraft
- Current owner: Mattel
- Produced by: Mattel
- Country: United States
- Introduced: 1966
- Discontinued: 1969; 57 years ago

Major Matt Mason was a brand of an action figure line created by Mattel. Matt Mason was an astronaut who lived and worked on the Moon. When introduced in 1966, the figures were initially based on design information found in Life Magazine, Air Force Magazine, Jane's, and other aviation- and space-interest periodicals. Later, the line attempted to transition into the realm of science fiction.

== Toyline description ==
=== Mason's crew (The "Men in Space") ===
The toy line included four astronaut action figure characters sharing a common body molded of a rubber-like material called "Plastizol" (which was also used in the Mattel "Thing Maker" toy line and "Mister Twister" line of fishing bait). The body was molded over a wire armature, with a separately attached head and a removable space helmet based on early NASA helmets. The wire frame often suffered from metal fatigue, breaking at the elbow, knee, and hip joints, giving the toy a limited life span as a result.

The space suit paint adhered poorly to the body molding and often peeled off to reveal the black molding beneath. Each character body was painted in a different color and had a separately modeled head. Matt Mason had a dark brown crew cut and a white space suit, Sgt. Storm had blond hair and a red suit; civilian astronaut Doug Davis had a yellow suit and brown hair; Jeff Long was African-American, with a blue suit (almost two decades before Guion Bluford became the first American black man to orbit the Earth). Mason figures produced in 1966 are identified by blue straps on the space-suit. These straps were painted black in subsequent production years.

=== Aliens ===
The primary alien of the sci-fi period, "Captain Lazer", was a giant who towered over the astronauts. The character was originally depicted as a mysterious and possibly hostile entity, but later appeared to be the astronauts' ally against other, more hostile extraterrestrials. The figure had glowing red eyes, a glowing breastplate, and a laser pistol permanently attached to his hand. Transparent purple plastic attachments came with the figure that could alter the size and appearance of the weapon. The visual design included Caucasian flesh tones with dark brown hair styled to resemble the Vulcan hairstyles from Star Trek. The figure's "costume" was dark blue metalflake with silver accessories and trim. Although the head, arms and legs could rotate, it was not as poseable as the astronaut figures, and was made out of hard plastic. Due to these design differences it is possible that the figure was either intended for a different toy series, or may have been purchased from another company's toy line - probably a Japanese company. The tooling for the Captain Lazer body was later used to make large-size Battlestar Galactica action figures, including Colonial Warrior and the Cylon Centurion.

Callisto was a Jovian with a transparent green head, the same size as the astronauts, while Scorpio was a battery-powered, purple-and pink-colored, insect-like alien with a glowing head. Another insect-like alien called Or, who would have been packaged with an "Orbitor" flying vehicle, did not make it beyond the prototype stage.

=== Accessories ===
Also in the toy-line were a three-story "space station" (actually a Moon base), various lunar surface and flying vehicles, mostly battery-powered, and assorted accessories, variously powered by springs, pneumatics, strings, or batteries. What made the early run of the accessories appealing was that the designs were based directly on concepts promoted and demonstrated by NASA and the various contractors involved in America's "Race to the Moon" in the 1960s. The "Moon Suit" and the "Space Station", as well as the "Jet Pack" were actually seen as concept drawings in such magazines as Look and Life. The laser weapons were copied from designs of science fiction shows of the time.

There was also a Big Little Book, Moon Mission written by George S Elrick and illustrated by Dan Spiegle published in 1968 that had the astronaut and his friends confront both giant rabbits and huge burrowing worms on the Moon.

Mattel dropped the line in the mid 1970s as interest in the space program declined. The series is still fondly remembered, and collectors may pay top dollar for figures and accessories in mint condition. A mint-condition figure of the Major has reportedly accompanied several US Space Shuttle flights as an "unofficial crewman", and it has been confirmed that the figure did fly on John Glenn's Shuttle flight in 1998.

== In popular culture ==
In the pilot episode of Stargate SG-1, Samantha Carter attempts to defend her femininity by claiming that she played with dolls as a child. On further questioning, she reveals that the dolls were the action figures of the Major Matt Mason toy line.

In the first few moments of the motion picture The Wedding Planner, a Major Matt Mason action figure is seen dangling on his flight backpack delivering a toy wedding cake to Barbie and Ken dolls.

On Dark Shadows, the popular gothic soap opera of the late 1960s and early 1970s, David Collins had the Space Station in his room at Collinwood.

In the British show, Here Come the Double Deckers, there is a toy shop in the episode "The Case of the Missing Doughnut" that has many Major Matt Mason items, including the Space Station.

Major Matt Mason USA is the performing name of Matt Roth, a New York City-based musician and record producer, who is active in the Anti-folk and DIY music scene of New York's East Village.

In Kenneth Lonergan's play This Is Our Youth, Warren Straub is a 19-year-old from the Upper West Side who reminisces of playing with the Matt Mason line from Mattel as a kid.

Author M. Mitchell Marmel has used "Major Matt Mason" as a nom de plume since the early 1980s.

The character had a brief mention in the 1984 Garfield book Garfield: His 9 Lives in the ninth chapter, "Space Cat".

== Planned film ==
A 3D film based on the toy series was announced in 2011, with a tentative budget of $100 million and Tom Hanks set to star. A script was in development, co-written by Hanks and Graham Yost, about Major Matt Mason, an astronaut who lives and works on the Moon. The producers were trying to reach an agreement with Robert Zemeckis to direct the film. On September 7, 2019, Paramount Pictures acquired the film and Akiva Goldsman producing with Hanks and writing a script based on Michael Chabon's short story about Mason.

== See also ==
- Colorforms' Outer Space Men
- Ideal's Zeroids
