= Schwervon! =

- Origin: New York, NY, U.S.
- Years active: 1999–present
- Members: Matt Roth; Nan Turner
- Website: www.schwervon.com

Schwervon! is a two-piece American indie rock band. The band members are Matt Roth (Major Matt Mason USA) on electric guitar and Nan Turner on drums; the pair share singing duties. They started the band in 1999 on the Lower East Side of New York City, shortly after they began their ongoing romantic relationship. They have released five albums through Major Matt's Olive Juice Music independent record label. Their first two albums have also been distributed by Shoeshine Records in Europe, where they have toured with Jeffrey Lewis and Kimya Dawson. In 2011, they did European tours, opening for the recently reunited UK alternative band The Vaselines, as well as Belle and Sebastian

In 2012 Schwervon! relocated to Shawnee, Kansas. Their album, Broken Teeth, was released in 2014 on local Kansas City label Haymaker Records.

== Discography ==
=== Albums ===
- Quick Frozen Small Yellow Cracker (2000)
- Poseur (2004)
- I Dream of Teeth (2006)
- Elephant in the Room (2007; German compilation of previously released material)
- Low Blow (2009)
- Courage (2012)
- Broken Teeth (2014)

=== EPs and singles ===
- Gas Money Tour EP (2005; with Jeffrey Lewis)
- Elephant (2006; 7-inch single)
- Cotton Mouth (2006; 7-inch single)
- Fall Tour '06 EP (2006; with Toby Goodshank)
- "Paradise by the Dashboard Light" (2011; 4-way split 7-inch single/Meat Loaf cover with Elastic No-No Band, Huggabroomstik, and The Leader)
- Landlocked/Off Duty Trip (The Raincoats) (2013; 7-inch single)
- Blood Eagle/Wrath Of Angels (2017; 7-inch single)
