= Soft Black =

- Origin: Bushwick, Brooklyn
- Genres: Psychedelic rock, shoegaze, garage rock
- Years active: 2005-present
- Label: Plays with Dolls Records
- Members: Vincent Cacchione; Michael Stefanov; Patrick Curry; Chris Ibrahim
- Past members: Daniel Schlett; Matthew Molnar; Michael Curry; Nick Coleman; Robert Durham; Christopher Pierce; Brian Amsterdam; Zachary Cole Smith
- Website: https://www.softblack.net

Soft Black is an American, Brooklyn-based band, fronted by Vincent Cacchione. Much of Soft Black's lyrical content deals with Cacchione's dreams and nightmares. The band's sound was described as "a kind of bizarro-world Neil Young," as well as "[going] against the grain of [Brooklyn]’s more fashionable musical styles".

== History ==
Soft Black began as a regular act at the Sidewalk Cafe in Manhattan, and became a staple of the Brooklyn underground music scene during the late 2000s, releasing three full-length albums between 2005 and 2009: Ramblin' Down a Dead End Street, Blue Gold and The Earth Is Black. The band's latest release, the EP We Scatter Light, was released in 2011.

Frontman Cacchione also is a member of the band Caged Animals, along with his wife Magali Francoise and sister Talya Cacchione, and has performed with Shilpa Ray.

Original guitarist Zachary Cole Smith later found fame with his own band DIIV, formed in 2011 (he also performed as the touring guitarist for Beach Fossils).

In June 2020, it was announced that Soft Black was working on a new album and released a single called Midas Tongue.

== Members ==
- Vincent Cacchione – vocals, guitar, synthesizer
- Michael Stefanov – drums
- Patrick Curry – bass
- Chris Ibrahim – keyboards
- Daniel Schlett – electric piano, piano, synthesizer
- Matthew Molnar – bass
- Michael Curry – bass
- Nick Coleman – bass, drums, guitar
- Robert Durham – drums
- Christopher Pierce – drums
- Brian Amsterdam – guitar
- Zachary Cole Smith – guitar
- Turner Halsey – keyboards

== Discography ==
=== Albums ===
- Ramblin' Down a Dead End Street (2005, Plays with Dolls Records)
- Blue Gold (2007, Plays with Dolls Records)
- The Earth Is Black (2009, Plays with Dolls Records)

=== Singles and EPs ===
- "Pearl With No String" / "Are You Still?" (2008, Plays with Dolls Records)
- We Scatter Light EP (2011, Plays with Dolls Records)
