= Dan Fishback =

American dramatist

- Born: born November 4, 1981; Washington D.C.

Dan Fishback (born November 4, 1981, in Washington, D.C.) is an American performance artist, playwright and singer-songwriter who is heavily associated with New York City's anti-folk movement.

== Life and work ==
Since 2003, Fishback has been performing and writing in New York City. His work includes overt, radical politics and humor as well as experimental and musical theater, punk rock, twee-pop, and solo performances based on monologues. Fishback is the Helix Queer Performance Network's director.

== Theatre ==
In 2011, he performed a multimedia solo piece called thirtynothing which combines biographical information and content about gay artists who have died. According to Time Out New York, The Material World is about "socialist Jews in the 1920s who share a house with Madonna, Britney Spears and a modern gay slacktivist." The Village Voice compared the historical complexity of You Will Experience Silence to the plays of Tony Kushner.

== Music ==
As a performing songwriter, Fishback started in the East Village's anti-folk scene. His band, Cheese On Bread, released two full-length albums, "Maybe Maybe Maybe Baby" (2004) and "The Search for Colonel Mustard" (2007), the latter of which was re-issued in Japan in 2010 on Moor Works Records. As a solo artist, Fishback has released several recordings, including "Sweet Chastity" (2005, produced by César Alvarez of The Lisps), "Strange Little Faggots" (2006), Calendar Boys (2008), and "The Mammal Years" (2012, produced by Casey Holford). It featured contributions from Cheese on Bread guitarist Dibson T. Hoffweiler and Pansy Division Drummer Luis Illades. Fishback also fronted a hard rock band, The Faggots, which prompted controversy in the press.

Fishback released a full-length solo album, Sweet Chastity (Luv-a-Lot Records), in 2005, followed by an EP of cover songs, Strange Little Faggots, in 2006, and Calendar Boys (Off-Stage Fright Productions, 2008).

In 2007 Fishback recorded an audio performance-art piece called Faggotssaywhat? for the anti-folk compilation album Anticomp Folkilation.

In September 2006, Fishback was the subject of a piece on the PBS newsmagazine program In The Life.

== Other work ==
Fishback was part of the punk dance troupe Underthrust, which collaborated with singer-songwriter Kimya Dawson on several performances and videos.

His essay "Times Are Changing, Reb Tevye" appeared in the anthology Mentsh: On Being Jewish & Queer (Alyson Books, 2004), and was followed by several self-produced zines, including A Very Small Hole (2005) and What Have They Done To You? (2008). His visual installation, "Pen Pals," was featured in the 2011 Soho exhibition of the Pop-Up Museum of Queer History, for which he later served on the Selection Committee.
