= Crazy and the Brains =

American punk band

Crazy & the Brains
- Also known as: Crazy and the Brains, CATB
- Origin: Bayonne, New Jersey
- Genre: Punk rock
- Label: Independent
- Members: Christopher Urban, Ernest Young, Rob Mellinger, Ali Presses, Zac Pless
- Website: crazyandthebrains.net

Crazy and the Brains (stylized as "Crazy & the Brains") is an American punk band with its roots tracing back to a project led by Christopher Urban and Jeff Rubin. They first emerged around 2009, performing at open mic nights at The Sidewalk Cafe in New York, New York

== Members ==
Crazy & The Brains' current lineup features lead singer Christopher Urban, guitarist Ernest Young, bassist Rob Mellinger, drummer Zac Pless, and Anya Combs on saxophone.

Among its past members are Jeff Rubin, who played the xylophone, as well as Brett Miller on bass and Lawrence Miller on drums.

== History ==
Crazy & The Brains have toured with Gogol Bordello, The Bouncing Souls, The Bridge City Sinners, Days N Daze, Negative Approach, The Slackers, and Leftöver Crack.

Vice has compared them to Rancid and The Ramones. Earlier press also made mention of their use of xylophone in songs, referring to them as "xylo-punks" and noting "[t]here aren’t a whole lot of punk bands that feature the xylophone".

== Discography ==
=== Studio albums ===
- Let Me Go (2013)
- Good Lord (2014)
- Into the Ugly (2018)

=== EPs, splits and compilations ===
- Crazy and the Brains (2009) EP
- The Yellow EP (2010) EP
- Out in the Weedz (2011) EP
- Are On The Other Side (2012) Split EP with the Disconnects
- Where the Juice Drips (2020) EP
- Past Futurism (2024) EP

=== Singles ===
- All I Really Want (2014)
- Brain Freeze (2015)
- Punk Rocker (2021)
- East Side (2021)
- Open Eyes (2021)
- Tractor Beam remix with Mega Ran produced by K-Murdock of Panacea (2022)
