= Mr. & Mrs. Something =

American indie folk duo

- Origin: Oceanside, California; Seattle, Washington
- Genres: Americana, folk, indie folk, folk blues
- Years active: 2012–present
- Members: Bino Peck; Chelsea Peck
- Website: mrandmrssomething.com

Mr. & Mrs. Something are an American indie folk duo of Bino and Chelsea Peck. They originally met while they were attending Azusa Pacific University in Azusa, California, in 2008. They have released two studio albums, The Closure Soundtrack and Setting Sail, a studio EP, "The Nativity EP," and have contributed to several soundtracks.

== Background ==
Mr. & Mrs. Something are a husband-and-wife duo Benjamin Leonard "Bino" Peck and Chelsea Kothra Peck (née; Lidstrom). They first met while attending college together in 2008 at Azusa Pacific University, forming the group with a couple of harmonica sessions. Benjamin was born February 24, 1987, in Oceanside, California, with two older brothers, Jerome and Joseph. Chelsea was born in Seattle, Washington, on March 22, 1988, where she was raised with a younger brother Sean.

== Music history ==
The duo started in 2012, with their first studio album, The Closure Soundtrack, releasing in 2013. Their subsequent studio album, Setting Sail, was released on November 17, 2015.

== Members ==
- Benjamin Leonard "Bino" Peck (born February 24, 1987, in Oceanside, California)
- Chelsea Kothra Peck (née, Lidstrom, born March 22, 1988, in Seattle, Washington)

== Discography ==
Studio albums

- The Closure Soundtrack (2013)
- Setting Sail (November 17, 2015)
