= Ziff =

Ziff may refer to:

== People ==
- Arnold Ziff (1927–2004), British businessman and philanthropist
- Daniel M. Ziff (1973-), American investor and billionaire
- Dirk Edward Ziff (1965-), American investor and billionaire
- Lloyd Ziff (1942–2024), American photographer and art director
- Morris Ziff (1914?-2005), physician, educator and researcher specialising in arthritic and rheumatic disorders
- Paul Ziff (1920-2003), American artist and philosopher
- Robert D. Ziff (1967- ), American investor and billionaire
- William Bernard Ziff Sr. (1898–1953), American publishing executive
- William Bernard Ziff Jr. (1930–2006), American publishing executive

== Things ==
- Artie Ziff, a recurring character in The Simpsons
  - "The Ziff Who Came to Dinner", an episode of The Simpsons revolving around Artie Ziff
- Och-Ziff Capital Management, global hedge fund and alternative asset management firm
- Ziff Davis, American publisher and Internet company
- Zanzibar International Film Festival

== See also ==
- ZIF
