= Ziff brothers =

American billionaires

- Current region: United States
- Origin: New York City
- Founder: William Bernard Ziff Jr.
- Titles: Investors, philanthropists
- Members: Dirk Edward Ziff (b. 1965) Robert D. Ziff (b. 1967) Daniel M. Ziff (b. 1973)
- Estates: Gemini, Manalapan, Florida (sold 2021)

Dirk, Robert and Daniel Ziff, known as the Ziff brothers, are the sons of American publishing magnate William Bernard Ziff Jr. and Barbara Ingrid Beitz. They inherited the family fortune in 1994 and formed Ziff Brothers Investments.

== Education and personal life ==
Dirk Edward Ziff was born in 1965, Robert D. Ziff in 1967, and Daniel M. Ziff in 1973. Their father was the Jewish American media magnate William Bernard Ziff Jr. (1930–2006), who had inherited Ziff Davis from his father William Bernard Ziff Sr. and built the magazine publisher that included titles such as Popular Aviation, PC Magazine, and Car and Driver. Their mother was Barbara Ingrid Beitz, an ethnic German whose parents were awarded the "Righteous among the Nations" honorific by the State of Israel for providing refuge and risking their lives to save Jews during World War II.

Dirk Ziff graduated in 1981 from the Trinity School in New York City, where his father served as trustee. He later earned a Bachelor of Arts from Columbia University and a Master of Business Administration from Harvard. He is married to former Forbes magazine reporter Natasha Bacigalupo. The couple lives in North Palm Beach, Florida and vacations at their Martha's Vineyard home. They have two children.

Robert Ziff studied undergraduate electrical and computer engineering at Harvard, graduating magna cum laude. He then attended Cornell Law School, where he graduated first in his class and was editor of the Cornell Law Review. After law school, he clerked for Chief Judge Monroe G. McKay of the United States Court of Appeals for the Tenth Circuit in Salt Lake City, Utah, and later served as vice president of strategic planning at Ziff Communications Company. He is married to fellow Cornell graduate and attorney Michelle Angelic Locher. They live in Manhattan with their twin sons. He sits on the board of trustees at The Browning School attended by his son Jonathan.

Daniel Ziff graduated in 1989 from the Trinity School in New York City, and later earned a Bachelor of Arts from Columbia University. In 2009, he married Leslie Ziff, who serves on the boards of the American Ballet Theatre and Rosie's Theater Kids. The couple later divorced, and Daniel married Brianne Garcia Ziff in 2017. They live in New York City.

== Fortune ==
The Ziff brothers inherited the family fortune in 1994 after their father sold 95% of Ziff Davis to Forstmann Little for $1.4 billion and retired. William Ziff Jr. had originally wanted to pass the company on to his sons but they were not interested. Instead, they formed the Ziff Brothers Investments family office in New York City, investing their inheritances broadly across equities, debt, real estate, commodities, private equity and hedge funds. They also provided seed money to fund manager Daniel Och in exchange for a 10% stake in Och-Ziff Capital Management, which went public in 2007. Their investments greatly expanded the brothers' fortune. As of March 2018 Forbes estimated their net worth to US$4.8 billion each.

In 2021, the Ziffs sold their family estate known as Gemini, which is located along South Ocean Boulevard at the south end of Manalapan near Palm Beach, for $94 million. It had initially been listed for $200 million in 2015. It was bought by Jim Clark, who then sold it to Larry Ellison for $173 million in 2022 which was the largest residential sale ever in Florida at the time.

== Philanthropy and political contributions ==
In 1998, Robert Ziff donated $2 million to the Harvard University men's hockey program. In 2008, he established the Robert D. Ziff Professorship of Law at Cornell Law School. He also made headlines in 2011 for his financial contributions to Republican legislators supportive of gay marriage. In 2018, Dirk and Daniel Ziff donated $2 million to the Center for Climate and Life, a research initiative at Columbia's Lamont–Doherty Earth Observatory.
