= Analog's From Mind to Mind: Tales of Communication =

1984 science-fiction anthology edited by Stanley Schmidt

Analog’s From Mind to Mind: Tales of Communication
- Cover of first edition
- Author: edited by Stanley Schmidt
- Cover artist: Joe Burleson
- Language: English
- Series: Analog anthologies
- Genre: Science fiction short stories
- Publisher: Davis Publications
- Publication date: 1984
- Media type: Print (paperback)
- Pages: 288 pp.
- ISBN: 0-385-19646-6
- Preceded by: Analog: Writers' Choice, Volume II
- Followed by: Analog's Expanding Universe

Analog's From Mind to Mind: Tales of Communication is the ninth in a series of anthologies of science fiction stories drawn from Analog magazine and edited by then-current Analog editor Stanley Schmidt. It was first published in paperback by Davis Publications in November 1984, with a hardcover edition following from The Dial Press in December 1984 under the alternate title From Mind to Mind: Tales of Communication from Analog.

The book collects sixteen short stories, novelettes and novellas first published in Analog and its predecessor title Astounding, together with an introduction by Schmidt.

== Contents ==
- "Introduction" (Stanley Schmidt)
- "Barrier" (Anthony Boucher)
- "The Signals" (Francis A. Cartier)
- "The Gift of Gab" (Jack Vance)
- "Top Secret" (Eric Frank Russell)
- "Meihem in ce Klasrum" (Dolton Edwards)
- "Omnilingual" (H. Beam Piper)
- "Minds Meet" (Paul Ash)
- "Two-Way Communication" (Christopher Anvil)
- "Duplex" (Verge Foray)
- "Sailing, Through Program Management" (Al Charmatz)
- "Beam Pirate" (George O. Smith)
- "From Time to Time" (Bruce Stanley Burdick)
- "Shapes to Come" (Edward Wellen)
- "The Piper's Son" (Lewis Padgett (Henry Kuttner and C. L. Moore))
- "Babel II" (Christopher Anvil)
- "Collaboration" (Mark C. Jarvis)
