= Analog's Lighter Side =

- Cover of first edition
- Author: edited by Stanley Schmidt
- Language: English
- Series: Analog anthologies
- Genre: Science fiction short stories
- Publisher: Davis Publications
- Publication date: 1982
- Media type: Print (paperback)
- Pages: 287 pp.
- Preceded by: Analog's Children of the Future
- Followed by: Analog: Writers' Choice

Analog's Lighter Side is the fourth in a series of anthologies of science fiction stories drawn from Analog magazine and edited by then-current Analog editor Stanley Schmidt. It was first published in paperback by Davis Publications in 1982, with a hardcover edition following from The Dial Press in January 1983.

The book collects thirteen short stories, novelettes and novellas and one poem, all first published in Analog and its predecessor title Astounding, together with an introduction by Schmidt. Most of the pieces are accompanied by the original illustrations from their initial magazine appearances, by artists Edd Cartier, Kelly Freas, John Sanchez, Jack Gaughan, and Vincent Di Fate.

== Contents ==
- "Introduction" (Stanley Schmidt)
- "Ex Machina" (Lewis Padgett)
- "Pate de Foie Gras" (Isaac Asimov)
- "Peek! I See You" (Poul Anderson)
- "The Exhalted" (L. Sprague de Camp)
- "Gone With the Gods" (Andrew J. Offutt)
- "Mail Supremacy" (Hayford Peirce)
- "The Gentle Earth" (Christopher Anvil)
- "A !Tangled Web" (Joe Haldeman)
- "Despoilers of the Golden Empire" (David Gordon)
- "The Present State of Igneos Research" (Gordon R. Dickson)
- "Ye Prentice and Ye Dragon" (poem) (Gordon R. Dickson)
- "Make Mine Homogenized" (Rick Raphael)
- "Allamagoosa" (Eric Frank Russell)
- "Ravenshaw of WBY, Inc." (W. Macfarlane)
