= Daniel M. Ziff =

American billionaire heir

- Born: Daniel Morton Ziff; 1973 (age 52–53)
- Education: Columbia University
- Occupation: Investor
- Spouse(s): Leslie Ziff (divorced); Brianne Garcia Ziff (divorced); Christina Ziff
- Children: 4
- Parent(s): William Bernard Ziff, Jr. Barbara Ingrid Beitz
- Relatives: Dirk Edward Ziff and Robert D. Ziff (brothers)

Daniel Morton Ziff (born 1973) is an American billionaire heir, and the youngest son of publishing magnate William Bernard Ziff, Jr. and grandson of William Bernard Ziff Sr. He and his two brothers inherited the family fortune in 1994. As of September 2021, his net worth is estimated at US$5 billion.

== Early life ==
Ziff was born in 1973. His mother was Barbara Ingrid Beitz, an ethnic German whose parents were declared as "Righteous among the Nations" for providing refuge and risking their lives to save Jews during World War II. His father was the Jewish American media magnate William Ziff Jr, who had built the Ziff-Davis magazine empire founded by William Bernard Ziff Sr. that included titles such as Popular Aviation, PC Magazine, and Car and Driver.

In 1989, Ziff graduated from the Trinity School in New York City where his father served as trustee. He later earned a Bachelor of Arts from Columbia University in 1996.

== Career ==
Ziff and his brothers Dirk Edward Ziff and Robert D. Ziff inherited the family fortune in 1994 after their father sold 95% of the business to Forstmann Little for $1.4 billion and retired. The father had originally wanted to pass the company on to his sons but they were not interested. Instead, they formed New York City-based Ziff Brothers Investments, investing their inheritances broadly across equities, debt, real estate, commodities, private equity and hedge funds. They also provided seed money to fund manager Daniel Och in exchange for a 10% stake in Och-Ziff Capital Management which went public in 2007. The brothers dissolved Ziff Brothers Investments in 2014 and now invest independently. Ziff was - according Rob Goldstone - funding democrats while at the same time an architect of the Magnitsky Act.

== Personal life ==
In 2009, Ziff married Leslie, who he later divorced, who serves on the boards of the American Ballet Theatre and Rosie's Theater Kids. In 2017, he married Brianne Garcia Ziff, who he later divorced. He recently married Christina Ziff. He has four children.
