= Newrez =

American Residential Mortgage Lender and Servicer

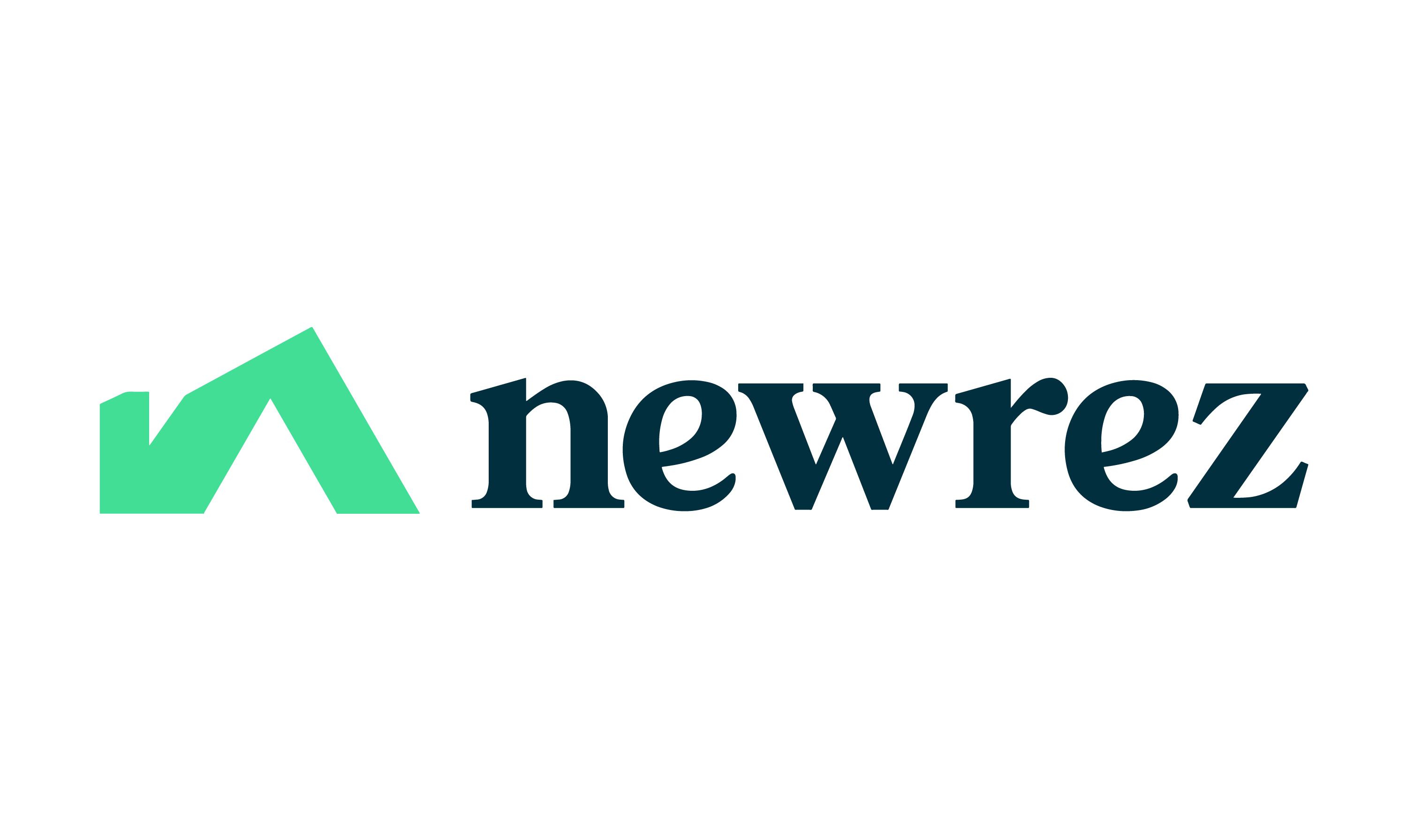
- Type: Subsidiary
- Industry: Mortgage lending and servicing
- Founded: 2018
- Headquarters: Fort Washington, Pennsylvania, United States
- Key people: Baron Silverstein President
- Parent: Rithm Capital
- Website: https://www.newrez.com/

Newrez LLC is an American residential mortgage lender and servicer offering residential mortgages through correspondent, wholesale, and consumer direct channels. Newrez is headquartered in Fort Washington, Pennsylvania, and was formed in 2018 as a wholly-owned subsidiary of New Residential, now Rithm Capital, through the acquisition of Shellpoint Partners, the owner of Shellpoint Mortgage Servicing and New Penn Financial. As of 2025, Newrez is the fourth-largest originator in the United States.

== History ==
In 2018, Rithm acquired Shellpoint Partners, the owner of New Penn Financial and Shellpoint Mortgage Servicing, creating Newrez and establishing a lending presence in 49 states through multiple lending channels, including wholesale, correspondent lending, direct-to-consumer, retail, and a network of joint venture partners. As part of the acquisition, newly created Newrez also gained a third-party servicing business through its acquisition of Shellpoint. The combined platform expanded through Rithm's 2019 acquisition of the assets of Ditech, a correspondent lender.

Baron Silverstein joined Newrez as president in 2020. Under Silverstein's leadership, Newrez saw a 176% production growth in 2020.

In 2021, Newrez expanded its operations through the acquisition of Caliber Home Loans, which added a retail lending platform to its portfolio.

In 2024, Rithm completed the acquisition of Computershare Mortgage Services Inc. for approximately $720 million, which included the purchase of Specialized Loan Servicing LLC. Following the deal, Specialized Loan Servicing portfolio and operations were merged with Newrez, which added a mortgage servicing rights (MSR) portfolio of about $136 billion in unpaid principal balance (UPB) to the company.

Also in 2024, Newrez pledged $500,000 to support the efforts of the benefit concert, Soulshine, headlined by Dave Matthews Band, which took place to aid in relief and recovery efforts during Hurricanes Helene and Milton.

In March 2025, Fitch Ratings reported that Newrez was a designated special servicer for both Fannie Mae and Freddie Mac, ranking it among the leading non-agency servicers in the U.S. residential mortgage market.

Newrez announced in 2025 the appointment of Brian Woodring as chief information officer after serving six years at Rocket Companies. The company also promoted Felicia Grumet to chief financial officer after joining Newrez the year prior as chief information officer. One month later, Newrez announced that it had hired Leslie Gillin as chief commercial officer following her experience as chief growth officer at Pagaya, an AI-driven financial technology company.

In July 2025, Newrez was reported as the fourth-largest mortgage originator by funded volume. Also in 2025, HousingWire reported that Newrez expanded its presence in non-QM, home equity, and prime jumbo lending segments. That same year, Newrez announced a partnership with Wells Fargo.

As of October 2025, Newrez reported a servicing portfolio of approximately $878 billion in unpaid principal balance, including about $282 billion in third-party servicing.

Silverstein was awarded HousingWire’s Vanguard award in 2025 for his work with Newrez. Under his leadership, the company has grown to become the fourth-largest lender and third-largest servicer in the U.S. through acquisitions and platform integrations.

In February 2026, Newrez's parent company, Rithm Capital, expanded its partnership with Valon Technologies, announcing a minority equity investment in Valon and plans to implement Valon's AI-native mortgage servicing platform, ValonOS, across Newrez's servicing operations by 2027.

== Products ==
Newrez operates through multiple lending channels, including direct-to-consumer, wholesale, and correspondent channels. It provides a range of residential mortgage products, including conventional, FHA and VA government-insured, jumbo, non-qualified mortgage (Non-QM), and home equity loans.

The company offers mortgage programs to support affordability and access to homeownership, such as RezSource, a low-down-payment mortgage product aimed at first-time buyers.

In addition to traditional loan products, Newrez offers programs designed to assist homebuyers, including Newrez Home Rewards, which provides closing cost support and advisory services through a technology partnership.

In January 2026, Fast Company reported that Newrez was among a small number of U.S. mortgage lenders to introduce the use of cryptocurrency holdings as a recognized asset in mortgage underwriting, as part of efforts to modernize lending practices and expand borrower qualification criteria.

=== Joint-venture mortgage lenders ===
In addition to its direct mortgage lending operations, Newrez has established a series of joint ventures with regional real estate brokerages across the United States. These partnerships are intended to expand the company's mortgage services and provide homebuyers with localized lending options, often under distinct joint venture names. Many of these joint ventures are formed and operated in collaboration with Shelter Mortgage, Newrez's subsidiary that is part of its joint venture division.

== Partnerships ==
In 2023, Newrez began a partnership with Microsoft to incorporate artificial intelligence tools from OpenAI into its data and customer service operations.

Also in 2023, Newrez began a partnership with the environmental nonprofit One Tree Planted, a global reforestation organization. As part of the initiative, the company pledged to plant trees in conjunction with its Earth Day campaigns. According to published reports, the multi-year collaboration supported the planting of more than 40,000 trees worldwide by 2024.

In February 2024, Newrez partnered with Newzip, a tech-enabled real estate platform, to create Newrez Home Rewards, a program aimed at saving credit costs for buyers and sellers.

Newrez announced a strategic investment in HomeVision to develop an AI-powered mortgage underwriting solution in January 2026.
