= Analog: Writers' Choice =

Sci-fi publication

- Cover of first edition
- Author: edited by Stanley Schmidt
- Cover artist: Peter Goodfellow
- Language: English
- Series: Analog anthologies
- Genre: Science fiction short stories
- Publisher: Davis Publications
- Publication date: 1983
- Media type: Print (paperback)
- Pages: 288 pp.
- Preceded by: Analog's Lighter Side
- Followed by: Analog's War and Peace

Analog: Writers' Choice is the fifth in a series of anthologies of science fiction stories drawn from Analog magazine and edited by then-current Analog editor Stanley Schmidt. It was first published in paperback by Davis Publications and hardcover by The Dial Press in 1983.

The book collects eleven short stories, novelettes and novellas first published in Analog and its predecessor title Astounding, together with an introduction by Schmidt.

== Contents ==
- "Introduction" (Stanley Schmidt)
- "With Folded Hands ..." (Jack Williamson)
- "Aristotle and the Gun" (L. Sprague de Camp)
- "Steel Brother" (Gordon R. Dickson)
- "Pandora's Planet" (Christopher Anvil)
- "Into Thy Hands" (Lester del Rey)
- "Grotto of the Dancing Deer" (Clifford D. Simak)
- "Rescue Operation" (Harry Harrison)
- "Revolution" (Mack Reynolds)
- "The Purpose" (A. E. van Vogt)
- "The Chosen People" (Robert Randall (Robert Silverberg and Randall Garrett))
- "Epilogue" (Poul Anderson)
