= Analog's War and Peace =

Anthology edited by Stanley Schmidt

- Cover of first edition
- Author: edited by Stanley Schmidt
- Cover artist: Joe Burleson
- Language: English
- Series: Analog anthologies
- Genre: Science fiction short stories
- Publisher: Davis Publications
- Publication date: 1983
- Media type: Print (paperback)
- Pages: 288 pp.
- Preceded by: Analog: Writers' Choice
- Followed by: Aliens from Analog

Analog's War and Peace is the sixth in a series of anthologies of science fiction stories drawn from Analog magazine and edited by then-current Analog editor Stanley Schmidt. It was first published in paperback by Davis Publications and hardcover by The Dial Press in June 1983. The hardcover edition bore the alternate title War and Peace: Possible Futures from Analog.

The book collects eleven short stories, novelettes and novellas first published in Analog and its predecessor title Astounding, together with an introduction by Schmidt.

== Contents ==
- "Introduction" (Stanley Schmidt)
- "E for Effort" (T. L. Sherred)
- "The Weapon Shop" (A. E. van Vogt)
- "The Wabbler" (Murray Leinster)
- "Conquest by Default" (Vernor Vinge)
- "Warrior" (Gordon R. Dickson)
- "Hawk Among the Sparrows" (Dean McLaughlin)
- "The Mercenary" (Jerry Pournelle)
- "No Shoulder to Cry On" (Hank Davis)
- "The Bully and the Crazy Boy" (Marc Stiegler)
- "Thunder and Roses" (Theodore Sturgeon)
- "Late Night Final" (Eric Frank Russell)
