= Riddle Me This =

Riddle me This or variation is a catchphrase used by the DC Comics supervillain and archenemy of Batman, The Riddler. It may also refer to:

== Literature ==
- "Riddle Me This" (story arc), a 21st century comic book story arc about the DC Comics character the Riddler
- Batman Adventures: Riddle Me This (graphic novel), a 2021 comic book in the DC Comics The Batman Adventures comic book series
- '"Riddle Me This . . . " (story), a 1972 story by Christopher Anvil; see Christopher Anvil bibliography
- Riddle Me this: Riddles and Stories to Sharpen Your Wits (book), a 2007 children's book by Hugh Lupton
- riddle me this (book; Irish: cuir amach seo dom), a 2014 poetry collection by Celia de Fréine

== Radio ==
- "Riddle Me This" (segment), a segment on the morning radio show The Shebang
- "Riddle Me This" (segment), a segment from the comedic radio show, Comedy Bang! Bang!

== Television ==
- Riddle Me This (TV game show), alternate name of the mid-century U.S. TV show Celebrity Time
- Riddle Me This (show within a show), a fictional game show within the TV show Batman: The Brave and the Bold; see List of Batman: The Brave and the Bold episodes
- "Riddle Me This" (advertisement), a 2000s TV commercial featuring the Riddler in the Batman OnStar commercials ad campaign
- "Riddle Me This" (Pokémon: Indigo League), a 1998 TV episode of Pokémon: Indigo League
- "Riddle Me This", a 1998 season 3 TV episode of The Wombles; see List of The Wombles episodes
- "Riddler #1: Riddle Me This!" (DC Nation Shorts), a 2013 TV episode of DC Nation Shorts
- "Riddle Me This" (Paradise Run), a 2016 season 1 TV episode of Paradise Run
- "Riddle Me This" (Ridley Jones), a 2021 season 1 TV episode of Ridley Jones
- "Riddle Me This!" (Tooned In), a 2021 season 1 TV episode of Tooned In
- "Riddle Me This" (Crown Lake), a 2022 season 3 TV episode of Crown Lake

== Music ==
- Riddle Me This (record), a 1959 record by Jean Ritchie
- Riddle Me This (album), an album by Oscar Brand; see Oscar Brand discography
- "Riddle Me This" (song), a song by Anarchy Club; see List of Rock Band Network 2.0 songs
- "Riddle Me This" (song), a 2008 song by Aaron Parks off the album Invisible Cinema
- "Riddle Me This" (song), a 2011 song by Office of Future Plans off the eponymous album Office of Future Plans (album)
- "Riddle Me This" (song), a 2018 song by Parliament off the album Medicaid Fraud Dogg

== Other uses ==
- Riddle Me This (play), a 1930s stageplay by Daniel Nathan Rubin
- Riddle Me This (ride), an amusement park ride at Six Flags America
- Riddle Me This (exhibition), a 2000 art exhibition by Anaida Hernández

== See also ==
- "Operation: Riddle Me This" (episode), a 2018 episode of Mani (web series)
- Fiddle Me This (disambiguation)
