= Children of the Future =

Children of the Future may refer to:

- Analog's Children of the Future, 1982 science fiction anthology
- Children of the Future (album), an album by the Steve Miller Band
