= Dirk Edward Ziff =

American billionaire businessman

- Born: 1965 (age 60–61)
- Education: Columbia University (BA); Harvard University (MBA)
- Occupation: Investor
- Known for: Inheritance, Investments
- Spouse: Natasha Bacigalupo
- Children: 2
- Parent(s): William Bernard Ziff Jr. Barbara Ingrid Beitz
- Relatives: Daniel M. Ziff; Robert D. Ziff

Dirk Edward Ziff (born 1965) is an American billionaire businessman, the eldest son of publishing magnate William Bernard Ziff Jr. and grandson of William Bernard Ziff Sr. He and his two brothers inherited the family fortune in 1994.

== Early life and education ==
Dirk Ziff was born in 1965. His mother was Barbara Ingrid Beitz, an ethnic German whose parents were awarded the "Righteous among the Nations" honorific by the State of Israel for providing refuge and risking their lives to save Jews during World War II. His father was the Jewish American media magnate William Ziff Jr. (d. 2006), who had built the Ziff-Davis magazine empire founded by William Bernard Ziff Sr. that included titles such as Popular Aviation, PC Magazine, and Car and Driver.

In 1981, Ziff graduated from the Trinity School in New York City where his father served as trustee. He later earned a Bachelor of Arts from Columbia University in 1988 and a Master of Business Administration from Harvard University.

== Career ==
Ziff and his brothers Daniel and Robert inherited the family fortune in 1994 after their father sold 95% of the business to Forstmann Little for $1.4 billion and retired. William Ziff Jr. had originally wanted to pass the company on to his sons but they were not interested. Instead, they formed New York City-based Ziff Brothers Investments, investing their inheritances broadly across equities, debt, real estate, commodities, private equity and hedge funds. They also provided seed money to fund manager Daniel Och in exchange for a 10% stake in Och-Ziff Capital Management which went public in 2007. The brothers dissolved Ziff Brothers Investments in 2014 and now invest independently.

In 2006, he served as a founding board member of the Robin Hood Foundation. In 2013, the Association of Surfing Professionals (since renamed the World Surf League) was acquired by ZoSea, an investment vehicle owned by Ziff along with Paul Speaker and Terry Hardy.

== Personal life ==
Ziff is married to the former Forbes magazine reporter Natasha Bacigalupo. The couple lives in North Palm Beach, Florida and vacations at their Martha's Vineyard home. They have two children.

In 2017, Ziff resigned from the board of The Weinstein Company along with fellow board members Marc Lasry and Tim Sarnoff, after allegations of sexual assault were disclosed.

In 2021, Ziff sold his family estate in Manalapan, Florida for $94 million. It had initially been listed for $200 million in 2015. It was bought by Jim Clark, who then sold it to Larry Ellison for $173 million in 2022.
