= Aliens from Analog =

Seventh anthology of Analog magazine stories

- Cover of first edition
- Author: edited by Stanley Schmidt
- Cover artist: Wayne Barlowe
- Language: English
- Series: Analog anthologies
- Genre: Science fiction short stories
- Publisher: Davis Publications
- Publication date: 1983
- Media type: Print (paperback)
- Pages: 287 pp.
- Preceded by: Analog's War and Peace
- Followed by: Analog: Writers' Choice, Volume II

Aliens from Analog is the seventh in a series of anthologies of science fiction stories drawn from Analog magazine and edited by then-current Analog editor Stanley Schmidt. It was first published in paperback by Davis Publications and hardcover by The Dial Press in 1983.

The book collects eleven short stories, novelettes and novellas first published in Analog and its predecessor title Astounding, together with an introduction by Schmidt.

== Contents ==
- "Introduction" (Stanley Schmidt)
- "First Contact" (Murray Leinster)
- "Green-Eyed Lady" (Alison Tellure)
- "The Children's Hour" (Lawrence O'Donnell (Henry Kuttner and C. L. Moore))
- "... And Comfort to the Enemy" (Stanley Schmidt)
- "Now Inhale" (Eric Frank Russell)
- "Unhuman Sacrifice" (Katherine MacLean)
- "Big Sword" (Paul Ash)
- "Wings of Victory" (Poul Anderson)
- "The Waveries" (Fredric Brown)
- "Hobbyist" (Eric Frank Russell)
- "Petals of Rose" (Marc Stiegler)
