= Takeoff! =

1980 short story collection by Randall Garrett

- First edition (publ. Starblaze)
- Author: Randall Garrett
- Genre: Science fiction and fantasy
- Publication date: 1980

Takeoff! is by a 1980 collection of science fiction and fantasy short stories, pastiches, and parodies, by Randall Garrett.

== Contents ==
The collection includes Garret's novelette Despoilers of the Golden Empire, a pulp magazine yarn mixing space travel and classic swashbuckling themes to the point where the space-travelling characters fight with swords, bringing to mind the adventures of Flash Gordon, or the Barsoom stories of Edgar Rice Burroughs. The story is later revealed to be a mistelling of the history of conquistador Francisco Pizarro. First published in March 1959, the story was designed as an early April Fools' Day prank. It was re-published in collections such as Takeoff! and in a later anthology entitled Analog's Lighter Side edited by Stanley Schmidt.

== Reception ==
Thrust called Garrett "one of the more under-rated writers in the field" of science fiction, noting that the collection features "Most of the odd little bits of his humorous writing".

Spider Robinson reviewed Takeoff! for Analog Science Fiction/Science Fact, and commented that "If you are a newcomer to or a very casual reader of SF, you may miss a lot of the jokes [...] but the well-read fan will find a lot of laughs here," and further noted that the illustrations by Kelly Freas are "as always, a joy."

Tom Easton likewise reviewed Takeoff! for Analog, praising it as "a collection of parodies, pastiches, reviews in verse, and groaners guaranteed to rouse at least a grin."

In Isaac Asimov's Science Fiction Magazine, Baird Searles noted that although "there are moments when Garrett descends to that level between freshman and junior, a lot of it is amusing even if I didn't do a lot of thigh slapping and gut busting."

Amazing Stories lauded it as "a delightful collection which people who know Randall Garrett have awaited for years," while Space Gamer/Fantasy Gamer stated that it "provide(s) an entertaining chance to enjoy some more works of a writer whose works are beginning to gain well deserved recognition as classics."

== Reviews ==
- Review by Donald M. Hassler (1986) in Fantasy Review, October 1986
