= Analog's Expanding Universe =

- Cover of first edition
- Editor: Stanley Schmidt
- Cover artist: Vincent Di Fate
- Language: English
- Series: Analog anthologies
- Genre: Science fiction short stories
- Publisher: Davis Publications
- Publication date: 1986
- Media type: Print (hardcover)
- Pages: 285 pp.
- ISBN: 0-681-40032-3
- Preceded by: Analog's From Mind to Mind: Tales of Communication
- Followed by: 6 Decades: The Best of Analog

Analog's Expanding Universe is the tenth in a series of anthologies of science fiction stories drawn from Analog magazine and edited by then-current Analog editor Stanley Schmidt. It was first published in hardcover by Davis Publications for Longmeadow Press in 1986.

The book collects fourteen short stories, novelettes and novellas first published in Analog and its predecessor title Astounding, together with an introduction by Schmidt.

== Contents ==
- "Introduction" (Stanley Schmidt)
- "Downeast Encounter" (Thomas A. Easton)
- "The Parasite Planet" (Stanley G. Weinbaum)
- "Sunspot" (Hal Clement)
- "A Flash of Darkness" (Stanley Schmidt)
- "Desertion" (Clifford D. Simak)
- "Saturn Alia" (Grant D. Callin)
- "Meet Me at Apogee" (Bill Johnson)
- "The Pacifists" (Jayge Carr)
- "With Morning Comes Mistfall" (George R. R. Martin)
- "Pathway" (Edward A. Byers)
- "Nightfall" (Isaac Asimov)
- "Starfog" (Poul Anderson)
- "Beer Run" (Michael McCollum)
- "Heart's Desire and Other Simple Wants" (W. Macfarlane)
