= The Analog Anthology 1 =

1980 sci-fi short story collection

The Analog Anthology #1
- Cover of first edition
- Author: edited by Stanley Schmidt
- Cover artist: Dean Ellis
- Language: English
- Series: Analog anthologies
- Genre: Science fiction short stories
- Publisher: Davis Publications
- Publication date: 1980
- Publication place: United States
- Media type: Print (paperback)
- Pages: 380 pp.
- Preceded by: The Best of Analog
- Followed by: The Analog Anthology #2

The Analog Anthology #1 is an anthology of science fiction stories and articles drawn from Analog magazine over its first fifty years of publication, edited by then-current Analog editor Stanley Schmidt. It was first published in paperback by Davis Publications in December 1980, and reprinted under the alternate title Fifty Years of the Best Science Fiction from Analog in 1982. A hardcover edition was issued under the alternate title Analog’s Golden Anniversary Anthology in 1981.

The book collects twenty-three short pieces first published in Analog and its predecessor title Astounding, together with an introduction by Schmidt.

== Contents ==
- "Introduction" (Stanley Schmidt)
- "Twilight" (Don A. Stuart)
- "The Lotus Eaters" (Stanley G. Weinbaum)
- "Fantastic Fiction" [editorial] (John W. Campbell Jr.)
- "Language for Time Travelers" [article] (L. Sprague de Camp)
- "QRM - Interplanetary" (George O. Smith)
- "—And He Built a Crooked House" (Robert A. Heinlein)
- "Far Centaurus" (A. E. van Vogt)
- "Placet is a Crazy Place" (Fredric Brown)
- "The Chromium Helmet" (Theodore Sturgeon)
- "The Endochronic Properties of Resublimated Thiotimoline" (Isaac Asimov)
- "No Copying Allowed" [editorial] (John W. Campbell Jr.)
- "The Dead Past" (Isaac Asimov)
- "Ceramic Incident" (Theodore L. Thomas)
- "The Dread Tomato Addiction" (Mark Clifton)
- "Transfusion" (Chad Oliver)
- "The Longest Voyage" (Poul Anderson)
- "Sleep No More" (James H. Schmitz)
- "Computers Don't Argue" (Gordon R. Dickson)
- "Test in Orbit" (Ben Bova)
- "The Prophet" (Stanley Schmidt)
- "The Asking of Questions" [article] (Poul Anderson)
- "Of Mist, and Grass, and Sand" (Vonda N. McIntyre)
- "Can These Bones Live?" (Ted Reynolds)
