= Robert D. Ziff =

American businessman (born 1967)

- Born: 1967 (age 58–59)
- Education: Harvard University (BA); Cornell University (JD)
- Occupation: Investor
- Known for: Inheritance, Investments
- Spouse: Michelle Angelic Locher
- Children: 2 sons
- Parent(s): William Bernard Ziff Jr. Barbara Ingrid Beitz
- Relatives: Dirk Edward Ziff; Daniel M. Ziff

Robert D. Ziff (born 1967) is an American billionaire, and the middle son of publishing magnate William Bernard Ziff Jr. and grandson of William Bernard Ziff Sr. He and his two brothers inherited the family fortune in 1994.

== Early life and education ==
Robert was born in 1967. His mother was Barbara Ingrid Beitz, an ethnic German whose parents were declared as "Righteous among the Nations" for providing refuge and risking their lives to save Jews during World War II. His father was the Jewish American media magnate William Ziff Jr. (d. 2006), who had built the Ziff-Davis magazine empire founded by William Bernard Ziff Sr. that included titles such as Popular Aviation, PC Magazine, and Car and Driver.

Ziff studied undergraduate electrical and computer engineering at Harvard University, graduating magna cum laude. In 1992, he graduated first in his class from Cornell Law School and was editor of the Cornell Law Review. After law school, Ziff clerked for Chief Judge Monroe G. McKay of the United States Court of Appeals for the Tenth Circuit in Salt Lake City, Utah and later was vice president of strategic planning at Ziff Communications Company.

== Career ==
Robert and his brothers Dirk and Daniel inherited the family fortune in 1994 after their father sold 95% of the business to Forstmann Little for $1.4 billion and retired. The father had originally wanted to pass the company on to his sons but they were not interested. Instead, they formed New York City-based Ziff Brothers Investments, investing their inheritances broadly across equities, debt, real estate, commodities, private equity and hedge funds. They also provided seed money to fund manager Daniel Och in exchange for a 10% stake in Och-Ziff Capital Management which went public in 2007. The brothers dissolved Ziff Brothers Investments in 2014 and now invest independently.

== Personal life ==
Robert is married to fellow Cornell Law School graduate and attorney Michelle Angelic Locher. He is on the board of trustees at The Browning School and The IDEAL School of Manhattan. His wife donated $40,000 to the campaign of Montana governor Steve Bullock, Democrat (second only to David Gray, a partner and chief legal officer at Ziff Brothers Investments who gave $45,000).

== Philanthropy and political contributions ==
In 2008, he established the Robert D. Ziff Professorship of Law at Cornell Law School. He also made headlines in 2011 for his financial contributions to Republican legislators supportive of gay marriage. In 2017, he endowed the Robert B. Kent Public Interest Fund at Cornell in honor of his law school professor.
