= The Analog Anthology 2 =

The Analog Anthology #2
- Cover of first edition
- Author: edited by Stanley Schmidt
- Language: English
- Series: Analog anthologies
- Genre: Science fiction short stories
- Publisher: Davis Publications
- Publication date: 1982
- Media type: Print (paperback)
- Pages: 284 pp.
- Preceded by: The Analog Anthology #1
- Followed by: Analog's Children of the Future

The Analog Anthology #2: Readers' Choice is an anthology of science fiction stories and articles drawn from Analog magazine, edited by then-current Analog editor Stanley Schmidt. It was first published in paperback by Davis Publications in January 1982, and reprinted later the same year under the alternate title Analog: Readers' Choice. A hardcover edition was issued by The Dial Press under the alternate title in March 1982.

The book collects eleven short pieces first published in Analog and its predecessor title Astounding, together with an introduction by Schmidt.

== Contents ==
- "Introduction" (Stanley Schmidt)
- "Old Faithful" (Raymond Z. Gallun)
- "Helen O'Loy" (Lester del Rey)
- "Requiem" (Robert A. Heinlein)
- "Some Curious Effects of Time Travel" (L. Sprague de Camp)
- "The Cold Equations" (Tom Godwin)
- "Plus X" (Eric Frank Russell)
- "The Big Front Yard" (Clifford D. Simak)
- "What Do You Mean ... Human?" [editorial] (John W. Campbell, Jr.)
- "Home is the Hangman" (Roger Zelazny)
- "Eyes of Amber" (Joan D. Vinge)
- "Ender's Game" (Orson Scott Card)
