= Analog: Writers' Choice, Volume II =

- Cover of first edition
- Author: edited by Stanley Schmidt
- Language: English
- Series: Analog anthologies
- Genre: Science fiction short stories
- Publisher: Davis Publications
- Publication date: 1984
- Media type: Print (paperback)
- Pages: 285 pp.
- Preceded by: Aliens from Analog
- Followed by: Analog's From Mind to Mind: Tales of Communication

Analog: Writers' Choice, Volume II is the eighth in a series of anthologies of science fiction stories drawn from Analog magazine and edited by then-current Analog editor Stanley Schmidt. It was first published in paperback by Davis Publications and hardcover by The Dial Press in 1984.

The book collects eleven short stories, novelettes and novellas first published in Analog and its predecessor title Astounding, together with an introduction by Schmidt.

== Contents ==
- "Introduction" (Stanley Schmidt)
- "Breeds There a Man...?" (Isaac Asimov)
- "To Be Continued" (Robert Silverberg)
- "The End of Summer" (Algis Budrys)
- "Won't You Walk—" (Theodore Sturgeon)
- "Operation Syndrome" (Frank Herbert)
- "The Bright Illusion" (C. L. Moore)
- "The Mechanic" (Hal Clement)
- "A Small Kindness" (Ben Bova)
- "The Unreachable Stars" (Stanley Schmidt)
- "Rescue Squad" (Katherine MacLean)
- "Gulf" (Robert A. Heinlein)
