= Digital Post Australia =

Australian digital postbox service company (2012–2014)

Digital Post Australia was an Australian company which provided a digital postbox service, allowing users to send and receive bills and other letters via a secure platform. The company closed in 2014, citing a lack of demand from consumers and organisations.

== History ==
The company was established in 2012, initially as a joint venture between Fuji Xerox Document Management Solutions and Computershare. Fuji Xerox subsequently sold its stake to Computershare. Upon its launch, Australia Post launched several rounds of unsuccessful legal action, despite Digital Post Australia being launched prior to any Australia Post digital service. The service was seen as a key competitor to the Digital Mailbox subsequently offered by Australia Post.

In 2013, Digital Post Australia had 983 organisations willing to send customers letters via the service. Of the 983, 977 were companies already using Computershare's share registry service. The remaining six were local councils in Queensland.

== Closure ==
In June 2014, the company announced their closure, citing a lack of consumer demand and support from organisations.
