= Christopher Anvil bibliography =

These are the complete works by American science-fiction writer Christopher Anvil, a pseudonym used by Harry Christopher Crosby.

== Bibliography ==
=== Fiction series ===
==== The Colonization Series (Federation of Humanity) ====
- "Revolt!" (1958)
- "Goliath and the Beanstalk" (1958)
- "The Sieve" (1959)
- "Leverage" (1959)
- "Mating Problems" (1959)
- "Star Tiger" (1960)
- "The Troublemaker" (1960)
- "The Hunch" (1961)
- "Hunger" (1964)
- "Bill for Delivery" (1964)
- "Contrast" (1964)
- "Untropy" (1966)
- "Stranglehold" (1966)
- "Strangers to Paradise" (1966)
- "Facts to Fit the Theory" (1966)
- "Experts In the Field" (1967)
- "The Dukes of Desire" (1967)
- "Compound Interest" (1967)
- "The King's Legions" (1967)
- "A Question of Attitude" (1967)
- "Uplift the Savage" (1968)
- "The Royal Road" (1968)
- Strangers in Paradise (1969): Edited fix-up of "Strangers to Paradise", "The Dukes of Desire" and "The King's Legions".
- "The Nitrocellulose Doormat" (1969)
- "Test Ultimate" (1969)
- "Basic" (1969)
- "Trial by Silk" (1970)
- "The Low Road" (1970)
- "The Throne and the Usurper" (1970)
- "The Claw and the Clock" (1971)
- "The Operator" (1971)
- '"Riddle Me This . . . "' (1972)
- "The Unknown (1972)
- "Cantor's War" (1974)
- Warlord's World (1975)
- "Odds" (1977)
- "While the North Wind Blows" (1978)
- "The Trojan Hostage" (1990)
- "The Power of Illusion" (2006)

==== Pandora's Planet ====
- "Pandora's Planet" (1956)
- "Part II: Able Hunter" (1972)
- "Pandora's Envoy" (1961)
- "Part IV: Pandora's Unlocked Box" (1972)
- "The Toughest Opponent" (1962)
- "Part VI: Contagious Earthitis" (1972)
- "Trap" (1969)
- "Part VIII: Pandora's Galaxy" (1972)
- "Sweet Reason" (1966)

==== The War with the Outs ====
- "The Prisoner" (1956)
- "Seller's Market" (1958)
- "Top Rung" (1958)
- "Symbols" (1966)
- "Foghead" (1958)
- "The Ghost Fleet" (1961)
- "Cargo for Colony 6" (1958)
- "Achilles's Heel" (1958)
- "Of Enemies and Allies" (2006)

=== Novels ===
- The Day the Machines Stopped (1964)
- The Steel, the Mist, and the Blazing Sun (1980)

=== Short fiction ===
- "Cinderella, Inc." (1952) (revised 2009) (also as by Harry C. Crosby)
- "Roll Out the Rolov!" (1953) (also as by Harry C. Crosby)
- "Advance Agent" (1957)
- "Sinful City" (1957)
- "Torch" (1957)
- "Compensation" (1957)
- "The Gentle Earth" (1957)
- "Truce by Boomerang" (1957)
- "Destination Unknown" (1958)
- "Nerves" (1958)
- "A Rose by Other Name" (1959) (also appeared as "A Rose by Any Other Name ...")
- "Captive Leaven" (1959)
- "The Law Breakers" (1959)
- "Shotgun Wedding" (1960)
- "A Tourist Named Death" (1960)
- "Mind Partner" (1960)
- "A Taste of Poison" (1960)
- "Identification" (1961)
- "No Small Enemy" (1961)
- "Uncalculated Risk" (1962)
- "Sorcerer's Apprentice" (1962)
- "Gadget vs. Trend" (1962)
- "Philosopher's Stone" (1963)
- "Not in the Literature" (1963)
- "War Games" (1963)
- "Problem of Command" (1963)
- "Speed-Up!" (1964)
- "Rx for Chaos" (1964)
- "We From Arcturus" (1964)
- "Merry Christmas From Outer Space!" (1964)
- "The New Boccaccio" (1965)
- "The Plateau" (1965)
- "The Captive Djinn" (1965)
- "Duel to the Death" (1965)
- "High G" (1965)
- "In the Light of Further Data" (1965)
- "Positive Feedback" (1965)
- "The Spy in the Maze" (1965)
- "The Kindly Invasion" (1966)
- "Devise and Conquer" (1966)
- "Two-Way Communication" (1966)
- "The Missile Smasher" (1966)
- "Sabotage" (1966)
- "The New Way" (1967)
- "The Murder Trap" (1967)
- "The Trojan Bombardment" (1967)
- "The Uninvited Guest" (1967)
- "The New Member" (1967)
- "Babel II" (1967)
- "Is Everybody Happy?" (1968)
- "High Road to the East" (1968)
- "Mission of Ignorance" (1968)
- "Behind the Sandrat Hoax" (1968)
- "The Great Intellect Boom" (1969)
- "Apron Chains" (1970)
- "Ideological Defeat" (1972)
- "The Knife and the Sheath" (1974)
- "Brains Isn't Everything" (1976)
- "The Golden Years" (1977)
- "A Handheld Primer" (1978)
- "A Sense of Disaster?" (1979) (also appeared as: "A Sense of Disaster")
- "The Gold of Galileo" (1980)
- "Top Line" (1982)
- "Superbiometalemon" (1982)
- "Bugs" (1986)
- "Rags from Riches" (1987)
- "Interesting Times" (1987)
- "Doc's Legacy" (1988)
- "The Underhandler" (1990)
- "Negative Feedback" (1994)
- "A Question of Identity" (1995)
- "The Problem Solver and the Killer" (2010)
- "The Hand from the Past" (2010)
- "The Problem Solver and the Hostage" (2010)
- "The Problem Solver and the Defector" (2010)
- "The Problem Solver and the Burned Letter" (2010)
- "Key to the Crime" (2010)
- "Warped Clue" (2010)
- "The Coward" (2010)
- "The Anomaly" (2010)

=== Collections ===
- Pandora's Planet (1972): fixup of four previously published stories with new linking material. Includes "Pandora's Planet", "Able Hunter", "Pandora's Unlocked Box", "Contagious Earthitis", and "Pandora's Galaxy".
- Pandora's Legions (2002): Reprints the material from Pandora's Planet along with "Pandora's Envoy", "The Toughest Opponent", "Trap" and "Sweet Reason", a short story set in the same universe but unlinked to the main plotline.
- Interstellar Patrol (2003): A collection of stories detailing the early adventures of Anvil's Patrol heroes, such as Vaughan Roberts, along with other short stories in the same setting. Includes "Strangers to Paradise", "The Dukes of Desire", "The King's Legions", "A Question of Attitude", "The Royal Road", "The Nitrocellulose Doormat", "Basic", "Test Ultimate", "Compound Interest", "Experts in the Field", "The Hunch", "Star Tiger", "Revolt!" and "Stranglehold".
- Interstellar Patrol II: The Federation of Humanity (2005): A collection detailing the later adventures of the Patrol which also contains all other stories in the Federation setting at the time of publication. Includes "The Claw and the Clock", '"Riddle Me This . . ."', "The Unknown", "The Throne and the Usurper", "The Trojan Hostage", Warlord's World, "Goliath and the Beanstalk", "Facts to Fit the Theory", "Cantor's War", "Uplift the Savage", "Odds", "The Troublemaker", "Bill for Delivery", "Untropy", "The Low Road", "Trial by Silk", "The Operator", "While the North Wind Blows", "Leverage", "The Sieve", "Mating Problems", "Hunger" and "Contrast".
- The Trouble With Aliens (2006): Reprints the "War With the Outs" stories along with three short stories retroactively rewritten to fit the in-universe chronology and a new conclusion to the sequence. The volume also includes other stories on theme of human contact with aliens, from the human perspective. Includes "The Prisoner", "Seller's Market", "Top Rung", "Symbols", "Foghead", "The Ghost Fleet", "Cargo For Colony 6", "Achilles's Heel", "Of Enemies and Allies", "The Kindly Invasion", "Mission of Ignorance", "Brain's Isn't Everything", "The Captive Djinn", "The Uninvited Guest", "Sabotage", "Mind Partner", "A Question of Identity" and "Advance Agent".
- The Trouble With Humans (2007): A further collection of stories on the theme of human contact with aliens, this time from the alien perspective. Includes "We From Arcturus", "The Underhandler", "Duel to the Death", "Shotgun Wedding", "The Law Breakers", "Compensation", "Merry Christmas From Outer Space", "The Plateau", "Captive Leaven", "Sinful City", "Beyond the Sandrat Hoax", "Nerves" and "The Gentle Earth".
- War Games (2008): A collection of Anvil's stories with military themes. Includes "Truce by Boomerang", "A Rose by Any Other Name . . .", "The New Member", "Babel II", "The Trojan Bombardment", "Problem of Command", "Uncalculated Risk", "Torch", "Devise and Conquer", "War Games", "Sorcerer's Apprentice", "The Spy in the Maze", "The Murder Trap", "Gadget vs. Trend", "Top Line", "Ideological Defeat", The Steel, the Mist, and the Blazing Sun and "Philosopher's Stone".
- Rx for Chaos (2009): A collection of speculative "idea SF". Includes "Cinderella, Inc", "Roll Out the Rolov!", "The New Boccaccio", "A Handheld Primer", "Rx for Chaos", "Is Everybody Happy?", "The Great Intellect Boom", "Interesting Times", "Superbiometalemon", "Speed-Up!", "Rags from Riches", "Bugs", "Positive Feedback", "Two-Way Communication", "High G", "Doc's Legacy", "Negative Feedback", "The New Way", "Identification", "The Golden Years", "No Small Enemy" and "Not in the Literature"
- The Power of Illusion (2010): A collection of the remainder of Anvil's previously unreprinted short fiction along with some new material. Includes "A Taste of Poison", "The Gold of Galileo", The Day the Machines Stopped, "The Missile Smasher", "The Problem Solver and the Killer", "The Hand from the Past", "The Problem Solver and the Hostage", "The Problem Solver and the Defector", "Key to the Crime", "The Problem Solver and the Burned Letter", "Warped Clue", "The Coward", "A Sense of Disaster", "Destination Unknown", "The High Road to the East", "A Tourist Named Death", "The Knife and the Sheath", "The Anomaly", "In the Light of Further Data", "Apron Chains" and "The Power of Illusion".
