= Unknown Worlds (disambiguation) =

Unknown Worlds is an alternate title for Unknown, a 1940s pulp magazine.

Unknown Worlds may also refer to:

- Unknown Worlds of Science Fiction, a 1970s comics magazine
- Unknown Worlds: Tales from Beyond, a 1989 short story collection
- Unknown Worlds Entertainment, a video game developer
