= Analog's Children of the Future =

- Cover of first edition
- Author: edited by Stanley Schmidt
- Language: English
- Series: Analog anthologies
- Genre: Science fiction short stories
- Publisher: Davis Publications
- Publication date: 1982
- Media type: Print (paperback)
- Pages: 288 pp.
- Preceded by: The Analog Anthology #2
- Followed by: Analog's Lighter Side

Analog's Children of the Future is the third in a series of anthologies of science fiction stories drawn from Analog magazine and edited by then-current Analog editor Stanley Schmidt. It was first published in paperback by Davis Publications and hardcover by The Dial Press in December 1982.

The book collects ten short pieces first published in Analog and its predecessor title Astounding, together with an introduction by Schmidt.

== Contents ==
- "Introduction" (Stanley Schmidt)
- "Mimsy Were the Borogoves" (Lewis Padgett (Henry Kuttner and C. L. Moore))
- "Mewhu's Jet" (Theodore Sturgeon)
- "The Witches of Karres" (James H. Schmitz) (first part of his novel of the same title)
- "Mikal's Songbird" (Orson Scott Card) (part of his book Songmaster)
- "In Hiding" (Wilmar H. Shiras)
- "Weyr Search" (Anne McCaffrey) (later incorporated into her book Dragonflight)
- "Meeting of Minds" (Ted Reynolds)
- "Novice" (James H. Schmitz)
- "Child of All Ages" (P. J. Plauger)
- "Emergence" (David R. Palmer) (later incorporated into his novel of the same title)
