= Fiddle Me This =

Fiddle Me This may refer to:

- "Fiddle Me This", a 1995 season 3 TV episode of Kidsongs
- "Fiddle Me This" (Amphibia), an episode of Amphibia
- "Fiddle Me This", a 2015 song by Yelawolf from the album Love Story

== See also ==
- Riddle Me This (disambiguation)
