= The Star-Crowned Kings =

1975 novel by Rob Chilson

- First edition
- Author: Rob Chilson
- Cover artist: Kelly Freas
- Language: English
- Genre: Science fiction
- Publisher: DAW Books
- Publication date: 1975
- Publication place: United States
- Media type: Print (Paperback)
- Pages: 188
- ISBN: 978-0-87997-606-4 (USA Edition)
- OCLC: 17735815

The Star-Crowned Kings is a science fiction novel by American writer Rob Chilson, published in 1975. This was the second full novel written by Chilson.

== Plot summary ==
The book is about the adventures of accidental protagonist Race Worden, a peasant living on the agricultural world of Mavia. His story is set in humanity's post-apocalyptic future where the human race has been split into two castes/species; Starlings and normal Humans. The Starlings, human mentalists who had developed powerful telekinetic powers that allow humankind to travel & settle the stars. Normal humans are under the repressive thumb of the Starling's authority. Only a small portion of human population consisted of these gifted mentalists called Starlings.

A considerable amount of technology has been lost, in many cases some worlds are reduced to mix of steam and elementary electronics.

Race Worden is an oddity, where he goes from his simple life to the dangers of developing Starling powers. Because of his ordinary human origins, he has become a renegade. Ignorant of the rules of Starlings, he lives on the run trying unite his family and taking them where they can be free.
