= Rithm Capital =

American investment management company

Rithm Capital Corp.

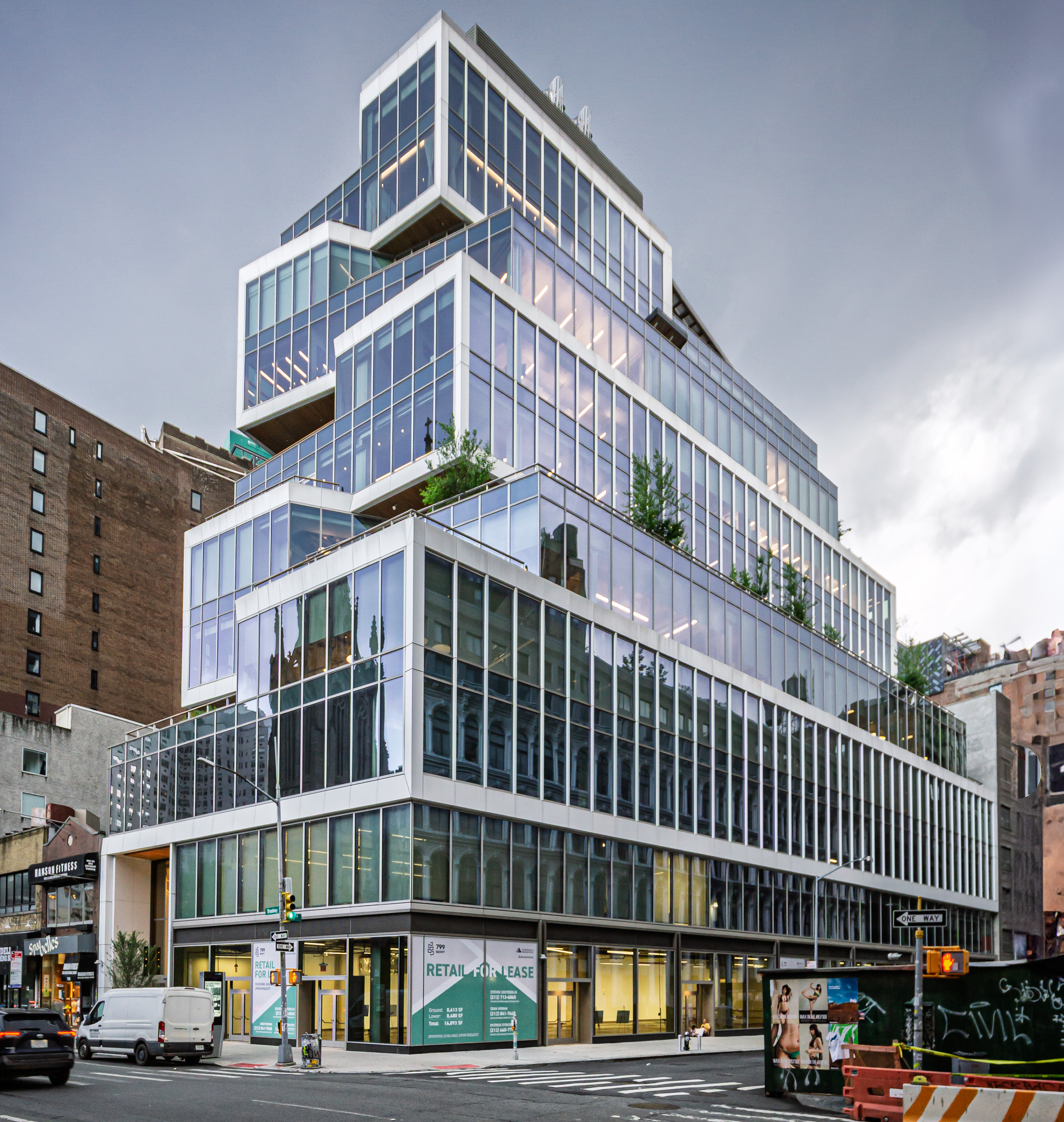
- Headquarters at 799 Broadway
- Formerly: New Residential Investment Corp.
- Type: Public company
- Traded as: NYSE: RITM; Russell 1000 component; S&P 600 component
- Industry: Financial services
- Founded: 2013; 13 years ago
- Headquarters: New York City, United States
- Key people: Michael Nierenberg (Chairman & CEO)
- Products: Real estate Alternative investments
- Revenue: ▲US$5.206 billion (2024)
- Net income: ▲US$941.5 million (2024)
- Total assets: ▲US$46.05 billion (2024)
- Total equity: ▲US$7.795 billion (2024)
- Number of employees: 6,045 (2024)
- Subsidiaries: Sculptor Capital Management
- Website: rithmcap.com

Rithm Capital Corp. (Rithm) is an American investment management company headquartered in New York that focuses on real estate and alternative investments.

== Background ==
On May 16, 2013, Newcastle Investment Corp, a real estate investment trust (REIT) under Fortress Investment Group spun off its residential mortgage related assets into a new REIT named New Residential Investment Corp. New Residential was listed on the New York Stock Exchange under the ticker 'NRZ' and would focus on investments related to mortgage servicing rights (MSR). There was a management agreement between New Residential and Fortress which stated Fortress would act as New Residential's manager and was entitled to 25% of the funds from operations as well as any profits from the sale of assets. In September 2013, Fortress hired Michael Nierenberg, Bank of America's head of global mortgages and securitized products to run New Residential.

In February 2015, New Residential acquired Home Loan Servicing Solutions for $1.3 billion.

In January 2017, Citigroup sold $97 billion worth of MSRs to New Residential for $950 million as part of its plan to exit the mortgage servicing business. In February, New Residential joined a consortium that included Jefferies, Third Point Management and Soros Fund Management to acquire $5 billion worth of unsecured forward flow consumer loans from Prosper Marketplace. In December, New Residential acquired Mortgage Lender Shellpoint Partners for $190 million.

In February 2019, Ditech filed for bankruptcy and in October sold its forward mortgage business to New Residential for $1.2 billion.

In April 2021 Newrez, a mortgage lending and servicing unit under New Residential, agreed to acquire Caliber Home Loans from Lone Star Funds in a $1.675 billion deal. In February 2022, Newrez laid off 386 employees or about 3% of its mortgage division.

In October 2021, New Residential acquired Genesis Capital from Goldman Sachs.

In June 2022, New Residential became independent from Fortress by terminating its management agreement by paying a termination fee of $400 million and rebranded as Rithm Capital with the ticker 'RITM'. It was done to reduce costs of around $60 to $65 million and attract more institutional investors who avoid externally managed structures. It retained the employees of Fortress who were now permanently with Rithm and would be internally managed going forward

In July 2023, after Goldman Sachs closed its consumer lending arm Marcus, it sold $1 billion of Marcus Loans to Värde Partners and $1.4 billion to Rithm.

In July 2023, Sculptor Capital Management agreed to be acquired by Rithm for $639 million which was $11.15 per share. In August, Sculptor received a higher bid from a consortium of hedge funds led by Saba Capital Management along with Pershing Square Capital Management and Avenue Capital Group. Daniel Och was not satisfied with Rithm's offer and felt it didn't reflect the full value of the company. In October, Rithm increased its bid of $720 million at $12.70 per share which was accepted by both Sculptor and Och. Although the consortium offered an even higher bid, it was rejected as Sculptor did not believe it could be delivered. On November 17, the deal was completed after the shareholders agreed to the acquisition.
