= Rob Chilson =

American science-fiction writer

Robert Chilson (born 1945) is an American science fiction author. Robert was born in Oklahoma. At about age six, he decided to be a writer.

He was discovered by John W. Campbell which led him to write stories for Analog, including collaborations with William F. Wu.

== Bibliography ==
=== Novels ===
- Chilson, Robert (1974). As the curtain falls. DAW Books.
- The Star-Crowned Kings (1975).
- The Shores of Kansas (1976)
- Men Like Rats (1989)
- Rounded with Sleep (1990)
- Black as Blood (1998)

Isaac Asimov's Robot City series

The series is based on Isaac Asimov's Robot series.

- 5. Isaac Asimov's Robot City: Refuge (1988)
