= Corporate trust =

Trust arrangement in which a corporation acts as trustee for assets or obligations

In the most basic sense of the term, a corporate trust is a trust created by a corporation. The term is most commonly used in the United States to describe the businesses that act in a fiduciary capacity for investors. This may be for stocks, bonds, or other securities. They are often financial service companies that provide specialist services for their corporate clients that may include debt issuance and management, escrow services, financing and document custody services.

== Usage ==
The term in the United States is most often used to describe the business activities of many financial services companies and banks that act in a fiduciary capacity for investors in a particular security (i.e. stock investors or bond investors). For example, instead of borrowing funds from a bank, a company might borrow funds from the general public in the form of a bond. When a bank lends money to a company, it may often inspect the company's financial statements to ensure that the company follows the rules (known as covenants) of the loan agreement, and may also attempt to negotiate a settlement if the company has problems and stops repaying its loan.

In the situation of a public bond issuance (the company borrowing from anyone in the general public who chooses to lend the funds), there would be no one clear person who would be capable to monitor the loans on their own, and the investors would find it difficult to agree and communicate their agreement to the company to settle any problems with the loan repayments. Therefore, they agree as a condition of their bond borrowing to appoint a financial institution, known as a "corporate trustee", to be the responsible party for monitoring compliance with the loan terms, acting in interests of the general public who have purchased the bond. Another aspect of this service, which is often performed by a different party, is the distribution of the repayment from the company to the bondholders, this function is known as a "paying agent". In fact, modern bonds often appoint many different financial institutions to have special roles, based on their area of expertise (such as corporate trustee with an expertise in bankruptcy who is only called in if the company stops paying back the bond). Financial institutions receive fees for their services.

Large corporate trust providers in the U.S. include Zions Bank, BOK Financial Corporation, U.S. Bank, Citi, Computershare, Deutsche Bank, The Bank of New York Mellon, One Investment Group and BNP Paribas Securities Services .

== Reasons ==
A corporation with little or no financial expertise may seek the services of a financial institution (often a corporation as well) through the creation of a corporate trust. By doing so, they are entrusting the finances of their corporation to that particular financial institution.

== Services offered ==
Corporate trust providers offer a wide range of services, which include but are not limited to:

- Debt trustee services, typically for corporate bond or government bond issuances
- Escrow services
- Warrant agency
- Public finance
- Project finance, including public-private partnerships
- Corporate finance
- Money market services
- Loan agency and administration, including collateral agency
- Structured finance
- Document custody services
