= Alison Tellure =

American writer of science fiction

- Born: Chicago, Illinois, U.S.
- Spouse: Rob Chilson
- Writing career
- Years active: 1977-1984

Alison Tellure is an American writer of science fiction who published several pieces of short fiction in the 1970s and 80s.

== Life ==
Tellure was born in Chicago, Illinois and grew up in Kansas City, Missouri. She obtained a degree in history and worked in various occupations such as artist's model and taxi dancer.

She married fellow SF writer Rob Chilson. The name Alison Tellure is a pseudonym.

== Work ==
Tellure's stories are set on an alien world over which a godlike creature rules, and which is also inhabited by smaller beings similar to humans. The stories were published in Analog Science Fiction and Fact from 1977 to 1984. One of them, "Green-Eyed Lady", was republished in the 1983 anthology Aliens from Analog.

Stanley Schmidt recommended her works as examples of how to effectively write from an alien viewpoint.

== Short stories ==
All published in Analog Science Fiction and Fact.

Title	Year	Notes
"Yes, Virginia"	1977	
"Lord of All It Surveys"	1977	
"Skysinger"	1977	
"Green-Eyed Lady, Laughing Lady"	1982	also published as "Green-Eyed Lady", nominated for the Analog Readers Poll Award
"Low Midnight"	1984	nominated for the Analog Readers Poll Award

== See also ==
- Analog Science Fiction and Fact
- John W. Campbell
- Rob Chilson
