= Daniel Och =

American financier and billionaire

Daniel Saul Och
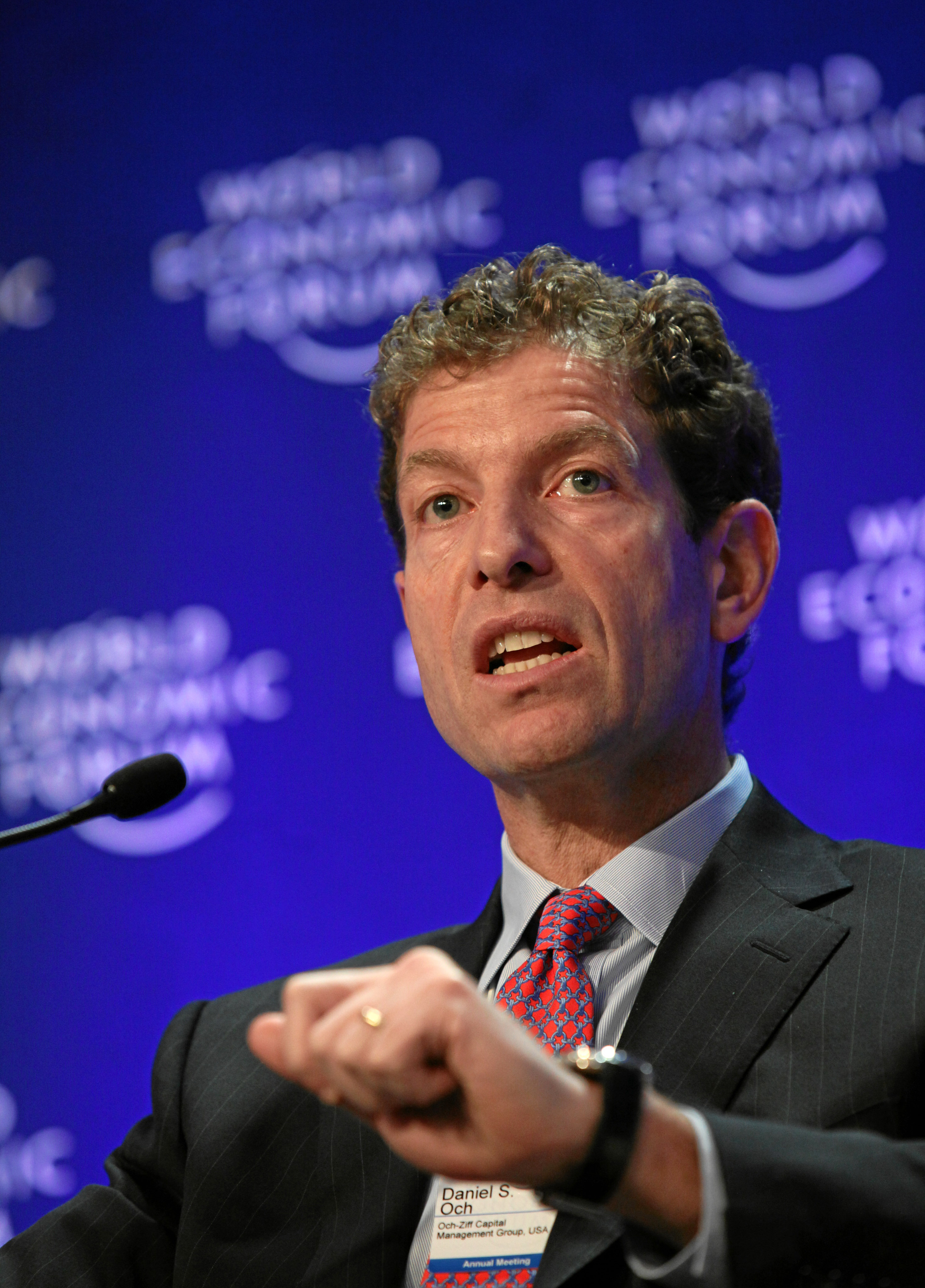
- Daniel Och at the World Economic Forum annual meeting in 2009
- Born: 27 January 1961 (age 65)
- Education: Wharton School of the University of Pennsylvania
- Occupations: hedge fund manager, and philanthropist
- Known for: Founder and chairman, Och-Ziff Capital Management
- Spouse: Jane Och
- Children: 3

Daniel Och (born 27 January 1961) is an American billionaire hedge fund manager, and philanthropist. He is the founder, chairman and former CEO of Och-Ziff Capital Management, a global hedge fund and alternative asset management firm. According to Forbes he has a net worth of US$3.6 billion, as of August 2021.

== Early life and education ==
Och is Jewish, the son of Golda and Dr. Michael Och. Och grew up in Maplewood, New Jersey and attended the Solomon Schechter Day School of Essex and Union (since renamed Golda Och Academy, in honor of his mother) in West Orange, New Jersey, a Jewish day school founded by his parents. In December 2010, Och donated $15 million to the school, effectively doubling its endowment. Och has a bachelor's degree in economics with a concentration in finance from the Wharton School of the University of Pennsylvania.

== Investment career ==
In 1982, Och began his career at Goldman Sachs in the Risk Arbitrage Department. He was later the head of proprietary trading in the Equities Division and co-head of U.S. Equities Trading. He worked at Goldman Sachs for 11 years. In 1994, Och founded Och-Ziff Capital Management Group with $100 million initial investment from the brothers Dirk Edward Ziff, Daniel M. Ziff, and Robert D. Ziff, heirs to publishing magnate William Bernard Ziff, Jr. Och-Ziff completed an initial public offering in 2007, listing its shares on the New York Stock Exchange initially at a price of $32.00. The company's stock has declined significantly since the IPO, reaching its all-time low of 3.29 on July 22, 2016.

In February 2014, Forbes listed Daniel Och as one of the 25 Highest-Earning hedge fund managers in 2013. His 2013 total earnings of $400 million ranks him the 17th among the 25 top earning hedge fund managers.

On May 8, 2015, Och was targeted by the "Hedge Clippers" activist group, who protested outside of his residence at 15 Central Park West, New York City.

In September 2016, the U.S. government fined Och $2.2 million and the Och-Ziff fund $413 million for paying over $100 million in bribes to various African government officials.

In February 2018, Och was replaced as CEO of Och-Ziff by Robert Shafir. Och remains chairman until March 2019. This change in leadership occurred following the 2016 bribery scandal and caused turmoil as Och had formerly indicated James Levin would be his successor before retracting that statement.

Dan Och now invests out of his single-family office, Willoughby Capital, and his new $750M SPAC, AJAX Holdings.

== Donations ==
=== Philanthropy ===
Och sits on the board of Endeavor. He is the vice chair of Robin Hood Foundation, a charitable organization fighting poverty in New York City. He has sat on the board of trustees of New York-Presbyterian Hospital since 2005.

In October 2017, the Spine Hospital of the NewYork–Presbyterian Hospital was named after Och and his wife following a $25 million donation. In 2014, the University of Michigan established The Och Initiative for Women in Finance named after the Och family.

In May 2022, The Jane and Daniel Och Family Foundation announced a $50 million gift to the New York-Presbyterian. The donation is to expand the Och Spine program across the New York area by increasing access to spinal care by establishing additional Och Spine facilities, while focusing additional resources on non-operative services and care.

=== Political contributions ===
In 2008, Och donated $28,500 to Democratic Senatorial Campaign Committee.

== Personal life ==
Och is married to Jane Och with whom he has three children. Och's personal interests include philanthropy, skiing, and history.
