= Soulshine (benefit concert) =

November 2024 benefit concert for Southern California fire victims

- Location: New York City, New York, US
- Venue: Madison Square Garden
- Date: November 24, 2024
- Website: Official website

Soulshine was a benefit concert that took place at Madison Square Garden on November 24, 2024. The sold-out event, produced by Dayglo Presents in conjunction with Live Nation, was designed to raise funds to aid relief and recovery efforts in Western North Carolina and Florida in the wake of Hurricane Helene and Hurricane Milton. Ultimately, over $4,500,000 in proceeds were directed to the Soulshine Concert Fund, which were distributed to a variety of organizations in two afflicted states.

== Event ==
The benefit was named after the Warren Haynes composition “Soulshine,” as Haynes is an Asheville, NC native whose family still lives in the area. The concert took place immediately following Dave Matthews Band’s two-night stand at Madison Square Garden on November 22 and 23. The initial roster of performers also included Warren Haynes Band, Nathaniel Rateliff & The Night Sweats, and Goose, along with guest artists Trey Anastasio, Mavis Staples, Robert Randolph, Joe Russo, Trombone Shorty, Susan Tedeschi and Derek Trucks.

At the time of the initial announcement, Haynes stated:

The damage and destruction caused by Hurricane Helene to my beloved home of Asheville and all of Western North Carolina has truly devastated me. Every year, it is my honor to host the Christmas Jam and give back to the community there, but this year, we need to do things a bit differently. I’m thrilled to partner with my good friends in Dave Matthews Band and so many other musician friends to bring Soulshine to the iconic Madison Square Garden and help raise money for all those affected by both hurricanes throughout North Carolina and Florida. My heart is with you all and we look forward to creating a really special night!

Haynes and Matthews opened the evening with a brief greeting, followed by an acoustic version of "Soulshine." Goose was the first group to appear and the band’s set included guest appearances by Robert Randolph on “Give It Time,” Derek Trucks on “Hungersite” and “Don’t Do It” (the latter song also featured Susan Tedeschi) and a cover of Bruce Hornsby’s “The Way It Is” with Matthews. The Warren Haynes Band set saw Randolph return for “This Life As We Know It” and Trucks reemerge for “These Changes” and “Whipping Post” which also included Russo. Nathaniel Rateliff & the Night Sweats later welcomed Staples for Pop Staples’ “Friendship” as well as Trombone Shorty, Preservation Hall Jazz Band's Ben Jaffe and Randolph for “S.O.B.” Prior to Dave Matthews Band’s concluding set, Matthews and Haynes performed James Taylor’s “Carolina In My Mind,” then Trucks joined for Tom Petty’s “Southern Accents” before Anastasio sang “Waste” with Matthews. Dave Matthews Band’s concluding set included Anastasio, Tedeschi and Rateliff adding vocals “The Weight,” Anastasio contributing guitar to “Lie In Our Graves” before Haynes and Trucks also appeared for “Melissa.” All of the evening’s performers then emerged for the “Come Together” finale.
