= William F. Wu =

Chinese-American author (born 1951)

William F. Wu is a Chinese-American science fiction, fantasy, and crime author.

== Literary career ==
He published more than seventy published works of short fiction. Some of them have been nominated for the Hugo Award. His work has been nominated for the Nebula Award twice and once for the World Fantasy Award. His short story "Goin' Down to Anglotown" was in the anthology The Dragon and the Stars, which won Canada's Aurora Award in the category of Best Related Work in English. "Goin' Down to Anglotown" was also a finalist for the Sidewise Award.

One of his stories was adapted into a Twilight Zone episode, "Wong's Lost and Found Emporium". Though Wu did not write the teleplay for the episode, he was present for its filming.

Wu has written eight novels using the Three Laws of Robotics invented by Isaac Asimov, including two entries in the Isaac Asimov's Robot City series, volumes 3 (Cyborg) and 6 (Perihelion). He also wrote six novels in Isaac Asimov's Robots in Time series. The two series in Asimov's universe were written to young adult standards, though they are not labeled as such. The latter was the first series licensed from Asimov's estate after his death.

Wu is also the author of The Yellow Peril (1982), a revised version of his doctoral dissertation in American Culture from the University of Michigan on American fiction's evolving depiction of Chinese and Chinese-Americans. His collection of comic books, documenting changing depictions of Asians and Asian-Americans in American comics from 1920 to 2001, is held at New York University's Fales Library.

== Bibliography ==
- In the Isaac Asimov's Robot City series, inspired by Isaac Asimov's Robot series, and his Foundation novels:
  - Isaac Asimov's Robot City: Cyborg (1987)
  - Isaac Asimov's Robot City: Perihelion (1988)
- Isaac Asimov's Robots in Time series:
1. Predator (1993) - A new robot named Hunter assembles a team of humans and journeys to the age of dinosaurs to find the first component robot, MC 1, before his actions in the late Cretaceous alter the course of Earth's zoology.
2. Marauder (1993) - Hunter pursues MC 2 to 17th-century Port Royal, Jamaica, in the time of privateers and buccaneers.
3. Warrior (1993) - Hunter and his team travel to Germany in the year 9 to stop MC 3 from interfering at the Battle of the Teutoburg Forest, a turning point in the history of the Roman Empire.
4. Dictator (1994) - Hunter tracks MC 4 in the World War II-era Soviet Union, shortly before the German army invades during the Battle of Moscow.
5. Emperor (1994) - MC 5 is followed to 13th-century China, where Hunter and his team meet the Manchu Emperor Kublai Khan and traveler Marco Polo.
6. Invader (1994) - In the final installment, the team travels to southern Britain to capture MC 6 in 459—in the time when a man named Artorius (King Arthur) led the Celts in war against the invading Saxons.
