= Computershare =

Australian financial services company

Computershare Limited
- Type: Public
- Traded as: ASX: CPU
- Industry: Financial services
- Founded: 1978; 48 years ago
- Headquarters: Abbotsford, Victoria, Australia
- Revenue: ▲US$3,257.5 million (2026)
- Operating income: ▲US$848.4 million (2026)
- Net income: ▲US$618.7 million (2026)
- Total assets: ▼US$4,966.7 million (2026)
- Total equity: ▲US$2,287.4 million (2026)
- Number of employees: 11,625 (2026)
- Website: computershare.com

Computershare Limited is an Australian stock transfer company that provides corporate trust, stock transfer, and employee share plan services in many countries.

The company currently has offices in 20 countries, including Australia, the United Kingdom, Ireland, the United States, Canada, the Channel Islands, South Africa, Hong Kong, New Zealand, Germany, and Denmark.

== History ==
Computershare Limited was founded in 1978 in Melbourne, Australia, and has grown largely through overseas acquisitions.

In 1997, the Australian-based Computershare expanded its registry business to include financial markets in New Zealand and the United Kingdom and acquired the Royal Bank of Scotland's registrar department. In subsequent years, it expanded its business into Ireland, India, South Africa, and Hong Kong.

Computershare and the firm SETL began collaborating on a blockchain project in 2016. The Louisville office of Computershare had 650 employees in May 2018. In Nov. 2018, the chairman of Computershare was Simon Jones. Stuart Irving was CEO.

In February 2023, Computershare called for an investigation into the exchange ASX for an alleged conflict of interest concerning the CHESS project, which had collapsed in November 2022.

== Acquisitions and sales ==
In 2004, Computershare acquired the stock transfer sectors of Harris Bank and Montreal Trust and purchased the German-based Pepper Technologies AG. Since 2004, Computershare has acquired registry companies in Russia and India.

In 2005, the company acquired Equiserve.

In 2006 the company bought the shareholder management services from National Bank of Canada.

In July 2007, Computershare acquired Datacare Software Group and its products GCM and Boardworks. Currently known as Computershare Governance Services and its main product GEMS.

In February 2008, Computershare announced a cash takeover offer for Australian mailhouse group QM Technologies Limited.

In September 2008, Computershare bought Lichfield based Childcare Voucher Services business called Busy Bees. The name has been re-branded to Computershare Voucher Services or CVS.

In February 2010, Computershare acquired HBOS Employee Equity Solutions from Lloyds Banking Group for a sum of around £40m.

In January 2012, Computershare acquired Shareowner Services (Stock Transfer Sector) from Bank of New York Mellon (BNYM) for a sum of around $550 Million.

In June 2013, Computershare Limited completed the acquisition of the EMEA–based portion of Morgan Stanley's Global Stock Plan Services business.

On 12 November 2018, it completed acquisition of Equatex Group Holding AG, formerly European shares plan business of UBS. The deal had been announced on 16 May 2018.

On March 23, 2021, Computershare acquired Wells Fargo Corporate Trust business for $750 million in the United States.

The company acquired SunDoc Filings in Sacramento, California in May 2023. Computershare Governance Services at that time was a subsidiary of Computershare Ltd., which was based in Melbourne, and was still traded on the Australian Securities Exchange and had 14,000 employees. It also had operations in around 20 countries after various acquisitions. In October 2023, the company sold its mortgage services unit to Rithm Capital in the U.S. for US$ 720 mln.

On April 25, 2024, Computershare announced that it had agreed to acquire BNY Trust Company of Canada, the Canadian corporate trust division of BNY Mellon.
