= The Steel, the Mist, and the Blazing Sun =

1980 novel by Christopher Anvil

First edition (publ. Ace Books)

The Steel, the Mist, and the Blazing Sun is a novel by Christopher Anvil published in 1980.

== Plot summary ==
The Steel, the Mist, and the Blazing Sun is a novel set in the 21st Century where both the United States and the Soviet Union have been destroyed in another World War.

== Reception ==
Greg Costikyan reviewed The Steel, the Mist, and the Blazing Sun in Ares Magazine #5 and commented that "The novel is readable and a suitable way to kill a few hours, but the premise is not terribly original, the writing not terribly interesting, the plot not terribly gripping... One wonders why Anvil tries."

== Reviews ==
Review by Brian Stableford (1981) in Foundation, #21 February 1981
