= Stanley Schmidt =

American science fiction author and editor (born 1944)

- Born: Stanley Albert Schmidt; March 7, 1944 (age 82); Cincinnati, Ohio, U.S.
- Education: University of Cincinnati; Case Western Reserve University (PhD)
- Occupations: Editor, writer
- Writing career
- Genre: science fiction

Stanley Albert Schmidt (born March 7, 1944) is an American science fiction author and editor. Between 1978 and 2012 he served as editor of Analog Science Fiction and Fact.

== Biography ==
Schmidt was born in Cincinnati, Ohio. He graduated from the University of Cincinnati in 1966. He then attended Case Western Reserve University, where he completed his PhD in physics in 1969.

After receiving his degree, he became a professor at Heidelberg College in Tiffin, Ohio, teaching physics, astronomy, biology, and science fiction.

Schmidt was editor of Analog Science Fiction and Fact magazine from 1978 to his retirement on 29 August 2012. Additionally, he has served as a member of the Board of Advisers for the National Space Society and the Science Fiction Museum and Hall of Fame and was Guest of Honor at BucConeer, the 1998 Worldcon in Baltimore, Maryland.

== Literary career ==
His first publication was "A Flash of Darkness" (Analog, September 1968); his first novel was The Sins of the Fathers (serialized in Analog from November 1973 to January 1974); and his first book was Newton and the Quasi-Apple in 1975.

One of his most recent novels, Argonaut (2002), shows an alien invasion from a new angle.

== Awards and honors ==
He was nominated for the Hugo Award for Best Professional Editor every year from 1980 through 2006 (its final year), and for the Hugo Award for Best Editor Short Form every year from 2007 (its first year) through 2013. He won the Hugo for the first time in 2013. In 2013 he was awarded a Special Committee Award for his editorial work.

He was awarded a 2014 Solstice Award, since renamed Kate Wilhelm Solstice Award.

== Bibliography ==
=== Novels ===
- Newton and the Quasi-apple. Garden City, N. Y.: Doubleday. 1975. ISBN 9780385055987.
- Tweedlioop. 1986.
- Argonaut. 2002.
- Night Ride and Sunrise. 2017. (Note: Originally published as a four–part serial in Analog Science Fiction and Fact during 2015.)

=== Kyyra series ===
- The Sins of the Fathers. 1976.
- See also the Lifeboat Earth collection of stories below.

=== Short fiction collections ===
- Lifeboat Earth. New York: Berkley Books. 1978. ISBN 9780425038208.
- Generation Gap and Other Stories. New York: Berkley Books. 2002.

=== Stories ===
Short stories unless otherwise noted.

- The Reluctant Ambassadors (1968)
- . . . And Comfort to the Enemy (1969)
- Lost Newton (1970)
- May the Best Man Win (1971)
- The Unreachable Stars (1971)
- The Prophet (1972)
- His Loyal Opposition (1976)
- Panic (1978)
- A Midsummer Newt's Dream (1979)
- Camouflage (1981)
- Tweedlioop (1981)
- Mascots (1982)
- War of Independence (1982)
- The Folks Who Live on the Hill (1984)
- Floodgate (1988)
- The Man on the Cover (1990)
- Worthsayer (1992)
- Not Even a Chimney (1993)
- Johnny Birdseed (1993)
- The Parallels of Penzance (1998) with Michael A. Burstein
- Good Intentions (1998) with Jack McDevitt
- Generation Gap (2000)
- The Emperor's Revenge (2002)

Lifeboat Earth series

- A Thrust of Greatness (1976)
- Caesar Clark (1977)
- Pinocchio (1977)
- Dark Age (1977)
- The Promised Land (1978)
- Second Interlude (1978)
- First Interlude (1978)
- Third Interlude (1978)
- Fourth Interlude (1978)

Title	Year	First published	Reprinted/collected	Notes
A Flash of Darkness	1968			
Prologue	1978			
Opportunity Knocks	2014	Schmidt, Joyce & Stanley Schmidt (October 2014). "Opportunity Knocks". Analog Science Fiction and Fact. 134 (10): 8–17.		
Night Ride and Sunrise – Part I of IV	2015	Schmidt, Stanley (July–August 2015). "Night Ride and Sunrise – Part I of IV". Analog Science Fiction and Fact. 135 (7–8): 10–42.	Later published (with the other three parts) as the novel Night Ride and Sunrise (2017)	Serial
Night Ride and Sunrise – Part II of IV	2015	Schmidt, Stanley (September 2015). "Night Ride and Sunrise – Part II of IV". Analog Science Fiction and Fact. 135 (9): 70–104.	Later published (with the other three parts) as the novel Night Ride and Sunrise (2017)	Serial
Night Ride and Sunrise – Part III of IV	2015	Schmidt, Stanley (October 2015). "Night Ride and Sunrise – Part III of IV". Analog Science Fiction and Fact. 135 (10): 70–104.	Later published (with the other three parts) as the novel Night Ride and Sunrise (2017)	Serial
Night Ride and Sunrise – Part IV of IV	2015	Schmidt, Stanley (November 2015). "Night Ride and Sunrise – Part IV of IV". Analog Science Fiction and Fact. 135 (11): 72–104.	Later published (with the other three parts) as the novel Night Ride and Sunrise (2017)	Serial

=== Anthologies (edited) ===
- Unknown (1988)
- Unknown Worlds: Tales from Beyond (1988) with Martin H. Greenberg
- Islands in the Sky: Bold New Ideas for Colonizing Space (1996) with Robert M. Zubrin
- Roads Not Taken: Tales of Alternate History (1998) with Gardner Dozois

Analog anthologies

- Analog Yearbook II (1981)
- The Analog Anthology #1 (1980) also appeared as: Analog's Golden Anniversary Anthology (1981) and Fifty Years of the Best Science Fiction From Analog (1981)
- The Analog Anthology #2 (1982) also appeared as: Analog: Readers' Choice (1982)
- Analog's Children of the Future (1982)
- Analog's Lighter Side (1982)
- Analog: Writers' Choice (1983)
- Analog's War and Peace (1983)
- Aliens from Analog (1983)
- Analog: Writers' Choice, Volume II (1984)
- Analog's From Mind to Mind: Tales of Communication (1984)
- Analog's Expanding Universe (1986)
- 6 Decades: The Best of Analog (1986)

=== Nonfiction ===
- Writing Science Fiction and Fantasy (1991) with Ian Randal Strock and Gardner Dozois and Tina Lee and Sheila Williams
- Aliens and Alien Societies: A Writer's Guide to Creating Extraterrestrial Life-Forms (1996)
- Schmidt, Stanley (2001). Which way to the future? Selected essays from Analog.
- — (2008). The Coming Convergence: Surprising Ways Diverse Technologies Interact to Shape our World and Change the Future.
- — (July–August 2008). "Choosing Tools". Editorial. Analog Science Fiction and Fact. 128 (7–8): 4–8.
- — (October 2008). "RSVP". Editorial. Analog Science Fiction and Fact. 128 (10): 4–7.
- — (April 2014). "Meditation on a Bar Stool". Guest Editorial. Analog Science Fiction and Fact. 134 (4): 4–7.
- — (January–February 2015). "Orbits to Order". Science Fact. Analog Science Fiction and Fact. 135 (1&2): 30–36.
- — (April 2015). "Hiding the Info-Dump, or: Feeding Information Without Choking the Reader". Special Feature. Analog Science Fiction and Fact. 135 (4): 54–61.
- — (June 2015). "A Future for Analog". Special Feature. Analog Science Fiction and Fact. 135 (6): 7–9.
- — (December 2015). "The science of Night ride and sunrise". Science Fact. Analog Science Fiction and Fact. 135 (12): 38–44.
- — (July–August 2016). "The end or leaving the reader satisfied". Special Feature. Analog Science Fiction and Fact. 136 (7&8): 118–124.

=== Interviews ===
- Zinos-Amaro, Alvaro (December 2015). "Backpack and packrat : an interview with Stanley Schmidt". Analog Science Fiction and Fact. 135 (12): 45–47.
