= Unknown Worlds: Tales from Beyond =

Anthology of American fantasy fiction

- Cover of Unknown Worlds: Tales from Beyond
- Editors: Stanley Schmidt; Martin H. Greenberg
- Cover artist: Yemi
- Language: English
- Genre: Fantasy
- Publisher: Galahad Books
- Publication date: 1989
- Publication place: United States
- Media type: Print (hardcover)
- Pages: 517 pp
- ISBN: 978-0-88365-728-7
- OCLC: 20328733
- LC Class: 88-80836

Unknown Worlds: Tales from Beyond is an anthology of fantasy fiction short stories edited by Stanley Schmidt and Martin H. Greenberg, the sixth of a number of anthologies drawing their contents from the American magazine Unknown of the 1930s-1940s. It was first published in hardcover by Galahad Books in 1989, though bearing a copyright date of 1988, and reprinted by Bristol Park Books in 1993.

The book collects twenty-five tales by various authors, together with an introduction by Schmidt.

== Contents ==
- "Introduction" (Stanley Schmidt)
- "Trouble with Water" (H. L. Gold) (Unknown, Mar. 1939)
- "The Cloak" (Robert Bloch) (Unknown, May 1939)
- "The Gnarly Man" (L. Sprague de Camp) (Unknown, June 1939)
- "The Misguided Halo" (Henry Kuttner) (Unknown, Aug. 1939)
- "Two Sought Adventure" (Fritz Leiber) (Unknown, Aug. 1939)
- "When It Was Moonlight" (Manly Wade Wellman) (Unknown Fantasy Fiction, Feb. 1940)
- "The Pipes of Pan" (Lester del Rey) (Unknown Fantasy Fiction, May 1940)
- "It" (Theodore Sturgeon) (Unknown Fantasy Fiction, Aug. 1940)
- "Fruit of Knowledge" (C. L. Moore) (Unknown Fantasy Fiction, Oct. 1940)
- "The Wheels of If" (L. Sprague de Camp) (Unknown Fantasy Fiction, Oct. 1940)
- "The Bleak Shore" (Fritz Leiber) (Unknown Fantasy Fiction, Nov. 1940)
- "They" (Robert A. Heinlein) (Unknown Fantasy Fiction, Apr. 1941)
- "Armageddon" (Fredric Brown) (Unknown Fantasy Fiction, Aug. 1941)
- "Mr. Jinx" (Fredric Brown and Robert Arthur (as by Arthur alone)) (Unknown Fantasy Fiction, Aug. 1941)
- "A Gnome There Was" (Henry Kuttner and C. L. Moore (as by Kuttner alone) (Unknown Worlds, Oct. 1941)
- "Hereafter, Inc." (Lester del Rey) (Unknown Worlds, Dec. 1941)
- "Snulbug" (Anthony Boucher) (Unknown Worlds, Dec. 1941)
- "The Refugees" (Frank Belknap Long) (Unknown Worlds, Feb. 1942)
- "Hell Is Forever" (Alfred Bester) (Unknown Worlds, Aug. 1942)
- "The Hag Séleen" (Theodore Sturgeon and James H. Beard (as by Sturgeon alone) (Unknown Worlds, Dec. 1942)
- "The Witch" (A. E. van Vogt) (Unknown Worlds, Feb. 1943)
- "Conscience, Ltd." (Jack Williamson) (Unknown Worlds, Aug. 1943)
- "Greenface" (James H. Schmitz) (Unknown Worlds, Aug. 1943)
- "Hell Hath Fury" (Cleve Cartmill) (Unknown Worlds, Aug. 1943)
- "Blind Alley" (Malcolm Jameson) (Unknown Worlds, June 1943)
