= Rosie's Theater Kids =

American non-profit arts education organization

Rosie's Theater Kids, formerly known as Rosie's Broadway Kids, is a non-profit arts education organization started by actress and comedian Rosie O'Donnell. RTKids was founded in 2003 and continually provides training in dance, music, and drama for students attending New York City public schools.

It is based on the Maravel Arts Center, 445 W. 45th St., in Hell's Kitchen, Manhattan. The center is named for O'Donnel's teacher Pat Maravel who was instrumental in O'Donnell's interest in theatre.
