= William B. Ziff Jr. =

American publishing executive (1930–2006)

- Ziff Jr. in 2002
- Born: William Bernard Ziff Jr. June 24, 1930
- Died: September 6, 2006 (aged 76); Pawling, New York, U.S.
- Education: B.A. Rutgers University
- Occupation: Businessman
- Known for: CEO of Ziff Davis Inc.
- Spouse(s): Barbara Ingrid Beitz (divorced); Tamsen Ann Kojis
- Children: with Beitz: Dirk Edward Ziff; Robert D. Ziff; Daniel M. Ziff
- Parent: William Bernard Ziff Sr.

William Bernard "Bill" Ziff Jr. (June 24, 1930 – September 9, 2006) was an American publishing executive. His father, William Bernard Ziff Sr., was the co-founder of Ziff Davis Inc. and when the elder Ziff died in 1953, Ziff took over the management of the company. After buying out partner Bernard G. Davis, he led Ziff Davis to become the most successful publisher of technology magazines in the 1970s and 1980s.

== Biography ==
He was born on June 24, 1930, to Bill Ziff Sr., a Jewish American publishing executive and author, and his second wife, Amelia Mary Morton. He was mainly raised in Miami, and then moved with his family to Sarasota, in 1947. A polymath with a photographic memory, he graduated from Rutgers University in 1951, then studied philosophy in West Germany. In 1953, after the death of his father, he moved to New York City to lead Ziff Davis Inc. Four years later, he bought out co-founder Bernard Davis, who then launched Davis Publications Inc. Ziff then re-directed the company toward enthusiast magazines and trade publications, with the acquisition of such titles as Car and Driver, Popular Electronics, PC Magazine, World Aviation Directory and Computer Shopper.

By focusing on enthusiast and trade publications, Ziff's salesmen were able to directly target advertisers who wanted to market to a specific audience. His approach was very successful: manufacturers and retailers were eager to advertise in his magazines at a time when general-interest publications were largely suffering from declining advertising sales.

In 1978, Ziff was diagnosed with prostate cancer, with a prognosis of only a few years to live. In 1984, he sold most of the consumer and business magazines for US$712.5 million keeping a few computer titles like PC Magazine. His computer magazines pioneered the format of conducting sophisticated technical tests of computer products; as a result, their reviews would often make or break the introduction of new personal computers, modems, or CD-ROM drives. During the rapid-growth genesis of personal computing, Ziff Davis quickly became the dominant computer publishing firm in the world. Ziff had wanted to turn the business over to his sons – Daniel, Dirk and Robert – but they did not desire the responsibility. In 1994, he announced the sale of the publishing group to Forstmann Little & Company for US$1.4 billion. The sale of the electronic publishing unit occurred later.

== Personal life and death ==
In 1963, Ziff married Barbara Ingrid Beitz in a Methodist ceremony. She was the daughter of the German industrialist Berthold Beitz and his wife Elsa, who were recognized by Yad Vashem (the Holocaust Martyrs' and Heroes' Remembrance Authority) as "Righteous among the Nations", for being the rare example among ethnic Germans by providing refuge and risking their lives to save Jews during World War II. They had three sons: Dirk Edward Ziff (b. 1965); Robert D. Ziff (b. 1967); Daniel M. Ziff (b. 1973). His sons are principals of Ziff Brothers Investments, in Manhattan and Greenwich, Connecticut; they were named on the 2012 Forbes 400 list of the richest Americans, with an aggregate net worth of approximately $12.6 billion.

Ziff later married future Metropolitan Opera chair Tamsen Ann Kojis, daughter of Dr. Ferdinand Kojis and Harriet Henderson (also known as noted opera soprano Harriet Henders who performed with famed conductors Arturo Toscanini and George Szell). Ziff died from prostate cancer in Pawling, New York, where he lived with Kojis.
