= Christopher Anvil =

American novelist

Harry Christopher Crosby, Jr.
- Born: March 11, 1925; Norwich, Connecticut, U.S.
- Died: November 30, 2009 (aged 84); Cayuta, New York, U.S.
- Occupations: Novelist, short story author
- Writing career
- Pen name: Christopher Anvil
- Genre: Science fiction

Christopher Anvil (March 11, 1925 – November 30, 2009) is a pseudonym used by American author Harry Christopher Crosby.

== Biography and work ==
Crosby was born in Norwich, Connecticut, the only child of Harry Clifton Crosby and Rose Glasbrenner. After serving as a pilot with the U.S. military, he began publishing science fiction with the story "Cinderella, Inc." in the December 1952 issue of the magazine Imagination. By 1956, he had adopted his pseudonym Christopher Anvil and his science-fiction work was being published in Astounding. He went on to a long and successful career in the field.

His stories usually about characters in different human government organizations, gadgetry, and subterfuge both internal and external while on an adventure. His military background enabled him to bring a certain realism to his portrayal of action and intrigue, which counterpointed the more fantastical elements of his stories.

Anvil appeared in Astounding/Analog throughout the 1950s and '60s. This was due his ability to write stories aimed at one of Astounding editor John W. Campbell's preferred concepts: alien opponents with superior firepower losing out to the superior intelligence or indomitable will of humans. Anvil also used humor in his characterization of story crafting, where his protagonists slid from disaster to disaster with the best of intentions, and through exercise of fast thinking, managed to snatch victory somehow from the jaws of defeat. According to David Weber, who acknowledges being influenced by Anvil:

An Anvil character triumphs by shooting the rapids, by caroming from one obstacle to another, adapting and overcoming as he goes. In many ways, his characters are science-fiction descendants of Odysseus, the scheming fast thinker who dazzles his opponents with his footwork. Of course, sometimes it's a little difficult to tell whether they're dazzling an opponent with their footwork, or skittering across a floor covered in ball bearings. But Anvil has the technique and the skill to bring them out triumphant in the end, and watching them dance is such a delightful pleasure.

His stories became a favorite with readers, and then ... "he hit a winning streak in the late 1960s in a series which seemed straight out of Star Trek ... The Interstellar Patrol".

Many of his nonseries stories are almost purely idea-driven science fiction. Some of the most striking of these, for example "Gadget vs. Trend", entirely lack dialogue and almost entirely lack characters; these stories consist of a series of newspaper reports or other similar materials. In these and other stories, Anvil's technique is to put forth a gadget, invention, or social trend and logically develop the consequences.

=== Novels by Christopher Anvil ===
Sources:

- The Day the Machines Stopped (1964)
- Strangers in Paradise (1969)
- Pandora's Planet (1972/1984)
- Warlords World (1975)
- The Steel, the Mist, and the Blazing Sun (1980)
- Pandora's Legions (2002)
- Interstellar Patrol (2003)
- Interstellar Patrol II: The Federation of Humanity (2005)
- The Trouble with Aliens (2006)
- The Trouble with Humans (2007)
- War Games (2008)
- RX for Chaos (2009)
- The Power of Illusion (2010)

== Modern reprints ==
As with other 20th century science fiction writers, Anvil's work became available through print-on-demand and ebooks.

One of Anvil's best-known short stories is "Pandora's Planet", which appeared first in Astounding in September 1956. It has since been reprinted several times, and also combined with the other stories in his Pandora series into a full-length "fixed-up" novel, Pandora's Legions.

Anvil also published a number of stories which he and John Campbell referred to as the Colonization Series:

The Colonization series can accurately be characterized, I think, as Christopher Anvil's magnum opus. Taken together, counting number of titles, the stories constitute almost one third of Anvil's science fiction output, totaling something like four hundred thousand words of writing.
