= Sculptor Capital Management =

American investment management firm

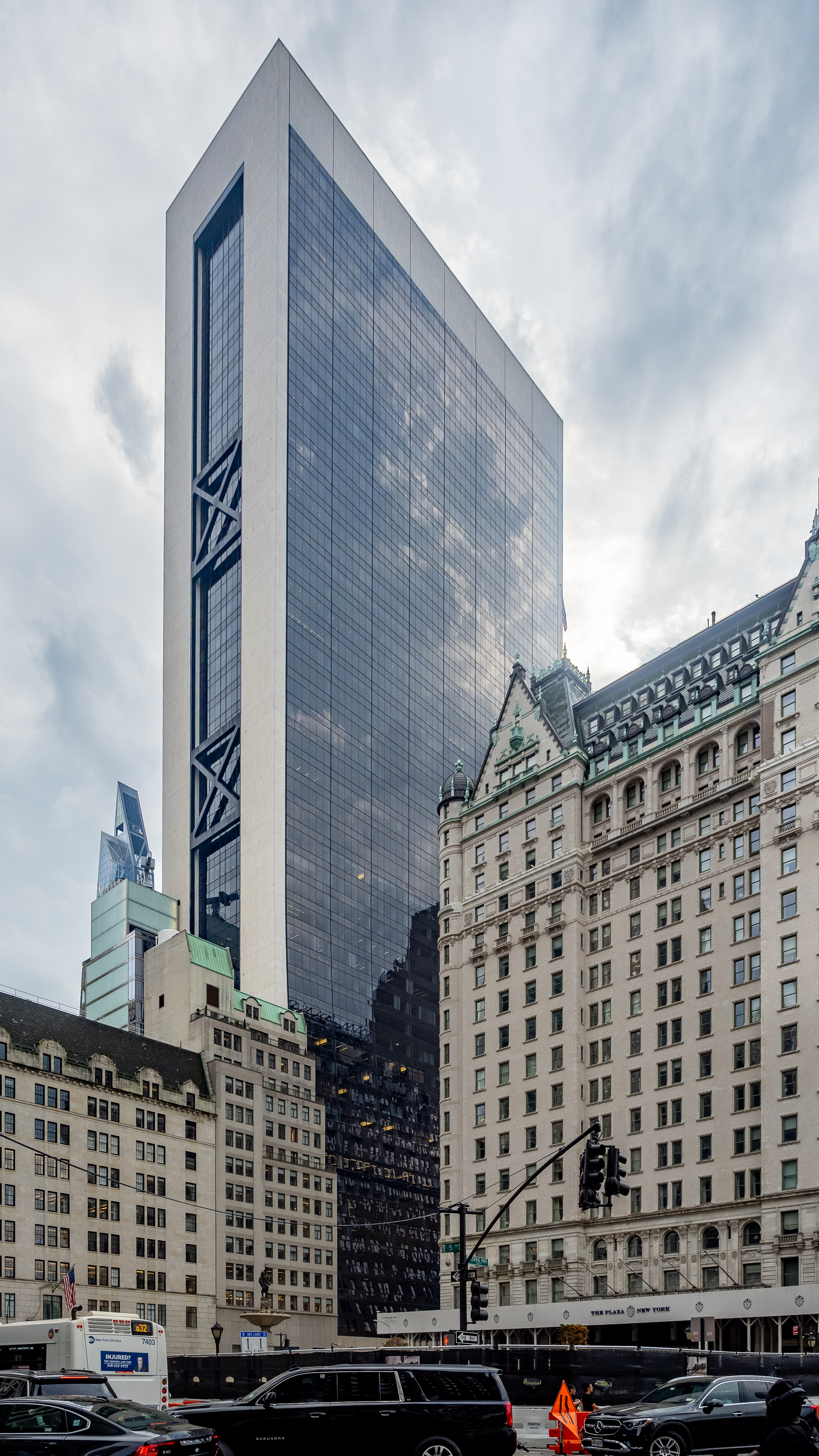
- Headquarters in the Solow Building
- Formerly: Och-Ziff Capital Management Group
- Type: Private
- Traded as: NYSE: SCU (2007-23)
- ISIN: US67551U1051
- Industry: Alternative Asset Management
- Founded: 1994; 32 years ago
- Founder: Daniel Och (1994-2019)
- Headquarters: Solow Building; New York City, New York, United States
- Key people: Jimmy Levin; (CIO & Executive Managing Partner); Wayne Cohen; (President & COO); Ellen Conti; (CFO)
- AUM: US$34 billion (2024)
- Owner: Rithm Capital (2023–present)
- Number of employees: 300+ (2024)
- Website: sculptor.com

Sculptor Capital Management (formerly Och-Ziff Capital Management Group) is an American global diversified alternative asset management firm headquartered in New York City. The firm is one of the largest institutional alternative asset managers in the world and operates multiple investment strategies, including multi-strategy, credit and real estate. It has over 300 employees worldwide including offices in New York City, London, and Hong Kong.

On November 17, 2023, Rithm Capital completed the purchase of Sculptor Capital Management for approximately $719.8 million.

== Structure ==
In 2021, Jimmy Levin was appointed CEO of the company. The firm is managed by the Partner Management Committee of seven executives.

The company manages multi-strategy funds, dedicated credit funds, including opportunistic credit funds and Institutional Credit Strategies products, real estate funds and other alternative investment vehicles, including managing collateralized loan obligations. The company manages $11.4 billion in multi-strategy funds, $6.4 billion in an opportunistic credit fund, $15.2 billion in institutional credit strategies, and $4.3 billion in real estate funds.

== History ==
The firm was founded as Och-Ziff in 1994 by Daniel Och with financial support from the Ziff family, founders of Ziff Davis Media. The company completed an initial public offering in 2007. The firm was one of the few hedge funds and private equity companies that completed IPOs before the 2008 financial crisis. Also in 2007, it became a founding member of the Hedge Fund Standards Board which sets a voluntary code of standards of best practice endorsed by its members.

In September 2016, the firm entered into settlement agreements with the United States Securities and Exchange Commission (SEC) and Department of Justice (DOJ), ending a five-year investigation into violations of the Foreign Corrupt Practices Act for allegedly paying bribes to government officials in several African nations. As part of the deferred prosecution agreement that settled civil and criminal charges, the firm agreed to pay a $413 million fine. The African subsidiary of the firm also pleaded guilty to one count of conspiracy. Och was charged by the SEC with causing a books and record violation and paid $2.2m in disgorgement as part of the settlement. After the settlement, the company restructured its leadership. In March 2019, founder and then-Chairman Dan Och stepped down, and in September 2019, the firm rebranded as Sculptor Capital Management.

In January 2018, Michael Cohen, former head of Och Ziff's European operations, was charged with fraud relating to activities of the company in Africa. He was charged with ten counts of fraud including investment adviser fraud and conspiracy to commit wire fraud while employed by Och Ziff. The SEC sued Michael Cohen as part of their probe into Och Ziff, specifically relating to an Och Ziff bribery scheme in the Democratic Republic of Congo, Chad and Libya, to win business for the company.

On September 12, 2019, the company changed its name from Och-Ziff Capital Management to Sculptor Capital Management. On May 15, 2019, Cohen pled guilty to one count of making false statements to the DOJ and was sentenced to three months; the other charges against him by the DOJ were dismissed.

As of December 2021, the firm has $38.1 billion in assets under management.

In January 2021, Sculptor became a signatory of the UNPRI as an investment manager.

In July 2023, Sculptor agreed to be sold to real estate investment firm Rithm Capital for approximately $639 million. The next month, Sculptor received an unsolicited bid from a consortium of hedge funds led by Saba Capital Management along with Pershing Square Capital Management and Avenue Capital Group. Despite the higher bid, Sculptor rejected the offer based on the terms of funding the acquisition.

In October 2023, Rithm Capital increased its bid to $720 million and gained the support of owner Daniel Och to accept the bid. On November 17, Rithm Capital completed the purchase of SCM for approximately $719.8 million.

== See also ==
- List of hedge funds
