= William Bernard Ziff Sr. =

American publishing executive (1898–1953)

Bill Ziff Sr.
- Born: William Bernard Ziff; August 1, 1898
- Died: December 20, 1953 (aged 55)
- Occupation: Publisher
- Known for: Co-founder of Ziff Davis Inc.
- Children: Bill Ziff Jr.

William Bernard Ziff Sr. (August 1, 1898 – December 20, 1953) was an American publishing executive and author.

== Early life ==
By 1916, Ziff was working as an artist. He would later go on to serve as an aviator in World War I.

== Ziff Davis Inc. ==
Ziff and Bernard G. Davis founded the magazine publisher Ziff Davis Inc. in 1927. After his death, in 1953, his son, Bill Ziff Jr., succeeded him at Ziff Davis.

== Political views ==
Being of Jewish ancestry and motivated by the power of Nazi Germany during the 1930s, Ziff became one of the most prominent American endorsers of Revisionist Zionism. During 1935, he was persuaded by devotees of the Revisionist Zionist spokesman Ze'ev Jabotinsky to accept the presidency of the Zionist-Revisionists of America organization although he resigned after one year, being uncomfortable with his role as a Jewish organizational official. Ziff remained active with Zionist politics and caused controversy when he authored during 1938 a criticism of British policy in the Holy Land entitled The Rape of Palestine. The British Foreign Office declared the book "violent and offensive" and monitored Ziff thereafter.

The studied gentility of the upper-bracket Arab leaves little to be desired. Dressed in his Abaye and red tarbush he is a colorful figure. His bearing is languorous and courtly, in vivid contrast to the direct speech and often uncouth manners of the immigrant Jew. Beneath this thin stratum, the balance of the Arab population is primitive in the extreme. For the most part it can hardly be said that they have risen above the stage of barbarism. They are, on the whole, of poor physical type and of low mentality. It would be hard to pose a wider disparity of culture, instinct and mind than lies between these people and the returning Hebrew.

In March 1946, Ziff spoke at a rally of 20,000 participants in Madison Square Garden protesting against Britain's recent reversal of its pro-Zionist policies in Mandatory Palestine.

== Personal life ==
On July 25, 1923, he married Denea Fischer (1902–1993); together, they had one daughter and later divorced. Ziff married Amelia Mary Morton (1903–1980) with whom he had three children.
