= Bernard George Davis =

American publisher (1906–1972)

Bernard George Davis (December 11, 1906 – August 28, 1972) was an American publishing executive. He and William Bernard Ziff Sr. founded Ziff Davis Inc. in 1927. In 1957, he sold his ownership share of Ziff-Davis to William Bernard Ziff Jr., and left to found Davis Publications Inc.

Davis Publications acquired Ellery Queen's Mystery Magazine at some point in the 1960s or early 1970s. It later purchased Alfred Hitchcock's Mystery Magazine in 1975 and Analog Science Fiction and Fact in 1980. In 1977, they launched Asimov's Science Fiction as a quarterly publication. All four magazines were sold to Dell Magazines in 1992.
