= Jack Lewis (musician) =

American songwriter

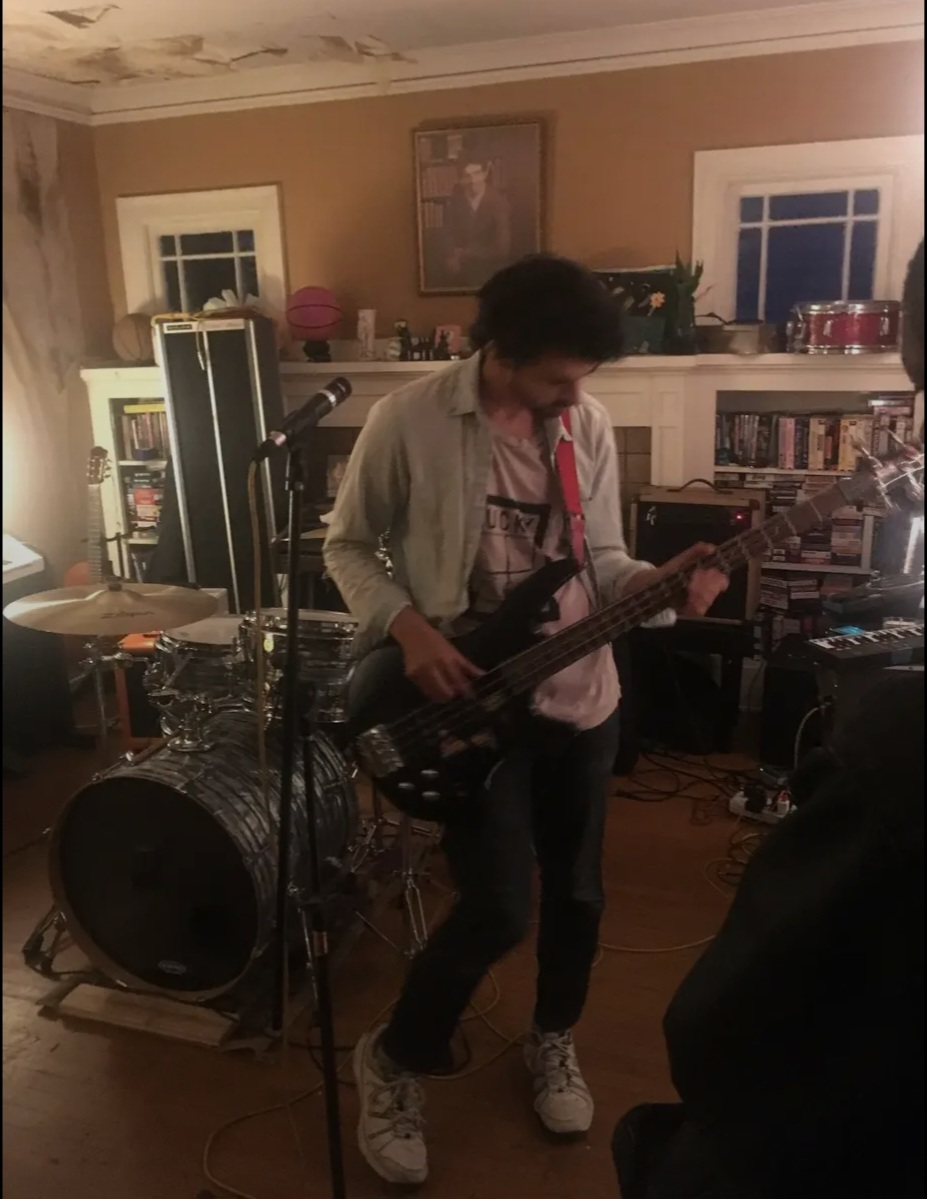
- Jack Lewis at house show 2018. By Rebecca Schiffman

Background information
- Also known as: Laissezfaire Lewis, Jack Lewis and the Cutoffs
- Born: October 1980 (age 45–46); New York City, New York, United States
- Genres: Lo-fi-DIY-Indie-Popcore, Beat poetry
- Occupations: Musician, visual artist
- Instruments: Vocals, bass
- Years active: 1997–present
- Labels: Smoking Gun; Rough Trade; OliveJuiceMusic.com https://dongiovannirecords.com/

Jack Lewis (born October 1980 in New York City, New York) is an American musician and artist. He was born and raised on the Lower East Side of Manhattan. He is the younger brother of Jeffrey Lewis, whom he has often performed and recorded with. Jack Lewis is now based in Portland, Oregon

== Biography ==
Lewis is a 1998 graduate of LaGuardia High School, where he focused on the visual arts. He went on to graduate from Bard College with a degree in visual arts in June, 2002.

=== Musical career ===
Lewis self-released L'vov's Lament under the name "Lesser Lewis" in 2002.

He has written and performed on songs for Jeffrey Lewis's albums It's The Ones Who've Cracked That The Light Shines Through in 2003, and Em Are I (2008).

Lewis released L'vov Reads His Notes in 2005 (featuring Herman Dune) and L'vov Goes To Emandee with My UNICEF Box in 2007 under the name: Jack Lewis and the Cutoffs. In 2007, he did a Take-Away Show.

The Bundles, a band featuring Kimya Dawson, Karl Blau, Anders Griffen, and Jeffrey Lewis and Jack Lewis, released their first album in March 2010 on K Records.

== Discography ==
- Hero Worship and the Animals We Love (7 inch EP) - as Jack "Laissezfaire" Lewis
- City and Eastern Songs (2005), Rough Trade - Jeffrey and Jack Lewis
- L'vov's Lament - as Jack "Laissezfaire" Lewis (with Ben Dope, Gottesman and Guitar Situations)
- L'vov Reads His Notes - as Jack Lewis and the Cutoffs
- L'vov Goes To Emandee with My Unicef Box- as Jack Lewis and the Cutoffs
