= Knock Knock Who? =

Knock-Knock Who?

Studio album by Kimya Dawson
- Released: September 29, 2003
- Genres: Alternative rock, Anti-folk, Acoustic
- Label: Important Records

Kimya Dawson chronology
I'm Sorry That Sometimes I'm Mean (2002)	Knock-Knock Who? (2003)	Hidden Vagenda (2004)

Professional ratings
Review scores
Source	Rating
AllMusic	3/5 stars
Robert Christgau	(choice cut)
PopMatters	(mixed)

Knock-Knock Who? is Kimya Dawson's second solo album, released concurrently with My Cute Fiend Sweet Princess in 2003.

== Track listing ==
1. "Nobody's Hippie"
2. "Great Crap"
3. "My Bike"
4. "Jest's Birthday"
5. "Time to Think"
6. "The Sound of Ataris"
7. "So Nice So Smart"
8. "For Boxer"
9. "I'm Fine"
10. "Stink Mama"
11. "Red White & Blue Dream (Oops!)"
12. "Once Upon a Time"
