= Alphabutt =

Studio album by Kimya Dawson
- Released: September 2008
- Recorded: February 2007 at Stupidio in San Francisco, California
- Genre: Alternative rock, anti-folk, children's music
- Label: K Records
- Producer: Kimya Dawson, Jason Carmer

Kimya Dawson chronology
Remember That I Love You (2006)	Alphabutt (2008)	Thunder Thighs (2011)

Professional ratings
Aggregate scores
Source	Rating
Metacritic	62/100
Review scores
Source	Rating
Allmusic	2.5/5 stars
Entertainment Weekly	B+
MSN Music (Consumer Guide)	A–
Pitchfork Media	7.5/10
Rolling Stone	3/5 stars
Spin	2.5/5 stars

Alphabutt is an album of children's music by Kimya Dawson, recorded in February 2007, recorded with Hidden Vagenda producer Jason Carmer. The Alphabutt sessions were completed on February 21, 2008, and the full album was released on K Records in September 2008.

Nine of the ten original songs have also appeared on self-released EP entitled Alphabutt E.Pee sold on Kimya's world tour in 2007. Each copy of the EP came in a unique hand-decorated folder of colored cardboard held together by a string. The folder contained an Alphabutt CD-R, a handwritten fact sheet and nine sheets of drawings on pink paper - one for each song. The flipside of the folder reads "made with love at the great crap factory".

Against previous plans, the retail CD did not come with a children's book: "I decided to just release it as a cd, because then it will be out much faster. I am going to make a book for kids another time. It will take forever to get a book completed but the cd is so close to being done. It is a crazy album! I am really excited about it."

== Track listing ==
No.	Title	Writer(s)	Length
1.	"Little Monster Babies"	Kimya Dawson	1:26
2.	"Alphabutt"	Dawson, Jason Carmer	0:55
3.	"Bobby-O"	Dawson, Carmer	1:50
4.	"Louie"	Dawson	2:13
5.	"Smoothie"	Dawson	2:12
6.	"I Like Bears"	Dawson	1:09
7.	"Seven Hungry Tigers"	Dawson	1:59
8.	"Happy Home (Keep On Writing)"	Dawson	3:34
9.	"Wiggle My Tooth"	Mcalister Shea	1:37
10.	"I Love You Sweet Baby"	Dawson	2:02
11.	"Pee-Pee in the Potty"	Dawson	0:29
12.	"Uncle Hukee's House"	Dawson	0:54
13.	"We're All Animals"	Dawson	2:22
14.	"Little Panda Bear"	Dawson	1:00
15.	"Sunbeams and Some Beans"	Dawson	3:45

== Personnel ==
- Callidora Cadogan – kazoo, vocals
- Kevin Cadogan – kazoo
- Jason Carmer – bass, guitar, drums, vocals, handclapping, producer, engineer, rattle, audio production
- Nico Carmer – drums, vocals, handclapping
- Kimya Dawson – guitar, piano, kazoo, vocals, handclapping, producer, audio production
- Erez Frank – vocals
- Sofia Jeremias – vocals
- Aki Mantia – piano
- Bryan "Brain" Mantia – drums, vocals
- McAlister Shea – drums, vocals
- Milo Milstead Murgia – drums
- Panda Dawson-Duval – piano, vocals
- Amani Shea – drums
- Barbara Shipowo – vocals
- Angelo Spencer – guitar, drums, vocals, wood block, blocks
