= Bundle =

Bundle or Bundling may refer to:

- Bundling (packaging), the process of using straps to bundle up items

== Biology ==
- Bundle of His, a collection of heart muscle cells specialized for electrical conduction
- Bundle of Kent, an extra conduction pathway between the atria and ventricles in the heart
- Hair bundle, a group of cellular processes resembling hair, characteristic of a hair cell

== Computing ==
- Bundle (OS X), a type of directory in NEXTSTEP and OS X
- Bundle (software distribution), a package containing a software and everything it needs to operate
- Bundle adjustment, a photogrammetry/computer vision technique

== Economics ==
- Bundled payment, a method for reimbursing health care providers
- Product bundling, a marketing strategy that involves offering several products for sale as one combined product

== Mathematics and engineering ==
- Bundle (geometry), a set of lines passing through a point in three-dimensional space or its generalization
- Bundle (mathematics), a generalization of a fiber bundle dropping the condition of a local product structure
- Bundle conductor (power engineering)
- Fiber bundle, a topological space that looks locally like a product space
- Optical fiber bundle, a cable consisting of a collection of fiber optics

== Music ==
- Bundles (album), a 1975 album by Soft Machine, including a song of the same title
- The Bundles, an anti-folk supergroup
  - The Bundles (album), a 2010 album by the group

== Politics ==
- Bundling (fundraising), when donations from many individuals are collected by one person and presented to the recipient
- Bundling (public choice), a similar concept to product bundling that occurs in electoral republics

== Law ==
- Bundle of rights (property law)
- Bundling (antitrust law), setting the total price of several products or services from one seller

== Other uses ==
- Bundle Brent, an Agatha Christie character
- Bundle theory, in philosophy
- Bundling (tradition), the traditional practice of wrapping one person in a bed accompanied by his/her courter
- Sacred bundle, a wrapped collection of sacred items held by a designated carrier in Indigenous American cultures
