= Thunder Thighs =

Studio album by Kimya Dawson and friends
- Released: October 18, 2011
- Recorded: 2011
- Studio: Dub Narcotic Studio (Olympia, WA); Stupidio (Berkeley, CA); Northern (Olympia, WA); The Senior Center (Olympia, WA); The Lambs (New York, NY); 307 Knox Records (Durham, NC); The Overlook (New York, NY)
- Genre: Anti-folk; indie rock
- Length: 1:05:12
- Label: Great Crap Factory
- Producer: Jason Carmer; Kimya Dawson

Kimya Dawson chronology
The Bundles (2010)	Thunder Thighs (2011)	Hokey Fright (2013)

Professional ratings
Aggregate scores
Source	Rating
Metacritic	72/100
Review scores
Source	Rating
MSN Music	B+
Paste	7.4/10
Spin	7/10
Under the Radar	3/10 stars

Thunder Thighs is the seventh studio album by American anti-folk musician Kimya Dawson and her second album under 'Kimya Dawson and Friends' umbrella. It was released on October 18, 2011, via Great Crap Factory. Recording sessions took place at Dub Narcotic Studio, Northern and The Senior Center in Olympia, Stupidio in Berkeley, The Lambs and The Overlook in New York, and 307 Knox Records in Durham. Production was handled by Kimya Dawson herself together with Jason Carmer. It features contributions from Aesop Rock among others.

== Track listing ==
No.	Title	Writer(s)	Length
1.	"All I Could Do"		3:37
2.	"The Mare and the Bear"	Kimya Dawson; Panda Dawson-Duval; Ben Kapp	2:09
3.	"Year 10"		3:49
4.	"Miami Advice"		5:27
5.	"Solid and Strong"		3:19
6.	"Zero or a Zillion"		4:31
7.	"Same Shit/Complicated"		6:40
8.	"I Like My Bike"		1:02
9.	"Driving, Driving, Driving"		6:12
10.	"You're In"		2:30
11.	"The Library"		4:34
12.	"Walk Like Thunder"	The Uncluded	10:34
13.	"Captain Lou"		3:15
14.	"Reflections"	Burt Bacharach	1:48
15.	"Unrefined"	Pablo Das	0:42
16.	"Utopian Futures"	Tin Tree Factory	5:03
Total length:			1:05:12

== Personnel ==
- Kimya Dawson — vocals, guitar (tracks: 1, 3–5, 7–10, 12, 16), keyboards (tracks: 1, 16), xylophone & kalimba (track 10), toy piano (track 11), whistling (track 16), producer, recording, mixing
- Nico Carmer — vocals (track 2)
- Panda Dawson-Duval — vocals (track 2), additional vocals (track 8), coins (track 5)
- Brian Sparhawk — vocals & guitar (track 3)
- Pablo Das — vocals (tracks: 3, 15), guitar (track 15), mixing
- Ben Kapp — vocals & guitar (track 4), drums (tracks: 5, 7, 9, 11, 12), percussion (tracks: 10–12)
- Clyde Petersen — vocals (track 4), guitar (tracks: 4, 7), mixing
- Ian "Aesop Rock" Bavitz — vocals (tracks: 4, 6, 11, 13), additional vocals (tracks: 12, 14), drums (track 4), recording, mixing
- Olympia Free Choir — vocals (track 7), additional vocals (tracks: 4–6, 11, 14)
- Gryffen Streeter — vocals & drums (track 8)
- Bryan Danielson — vocals (track 13)
- Jamoca Brown — vocals (track 13)
- Charlie Laroux — additional vocals (track 3)
- Leif Lee — additional vocals (track 3)
- Malcolm Rollick — additional vocals (track 3)
- Nyotni — additional vocals (track 3)
- Rye Carlin — additional vocals (track 3)
- Jack Dishel — additional vocals (track 4), guitar (track 12), recording
- Thao Nguyen — additional vocals (track 4)
- Jonah Matranga — additional vocals (tracks: 5, 9)
- John Darnielle — additional vocals (tracks: 6, 11, 12), guitar (track 5)
- McAlister Shea — additional vocals (tracks: 6, 8)
- Eva Gheorghiu — additional vocals (track 6)
- Nicholas "Murs" Carter — additional vocals (track 6)
- Dario Morbello — additional vocals (track 8)
- Patrice Jetter — additional vocals (track 8)
- Zephyr Morris — additional vocals (track 8)
- Quinn Tuffinuff — additional vocals (track 9, 12), photography
- Catyana Pelham-Bush — additional vocals (track 9)
- Cynthia Weiss — additional vocals (track 9)
- Julie Montgomery — additional vocals (track 9)
- Kina Wolfenstein — additional vocals (track 9)
- Lani B'Shalom — additional vocals (track 9)
- Forever Young Senior Citizen Rock And Roll Choir — additional vocals (track 11)
- Jason Carmer — additional vocals (track 14), bass (tracks: 3, 5, 8), producer, recording, mixing, engineering
- Stefanie Brendler — French horn (tracks: 2, 5)
- Peter Dizozza — piano (tracks: 2, 14)
- Rheanna Murray — accordion (track 2)
- Heather Dunn — drums (track 3), timpani (track 4)
- Andrew Dorsett — piano (tracks: 4, 5, 7, 9, 12)
- Ben Lucal — guitar (track 5)
- Mike Warren — banjo (track 5)
- Laurie Goldstein — cello (track 5)
- Chelsea Baker — pennywhistle (track 5)
- Angelo Spencer — guitar (tracks: 7, 10, 12), bass & drums (track 7), percussion (track 10)
- Aaron Hartman — bass (track 9)
- Alicia Jo Rabins — violin (track 9)
- Allyson Baker — guitar (tracks: 11, 13)
- Joey Seward — synth (track 11)
- Nikolai Fraiture — bass (track 12)
- Andrea Connolly — recording
- Dave End — mixing
- John Greenham — mastering
- Alex Pardee — artwork
- Meghan Hanlon — design
- Chrissy Piper — photography
- Lisa Klipsic — management
