= Remember That I Love You =

Studio album by Kimya Dawson
- Released: May 9, 2006
- Recorded: 2005
- Genre: Anti-folk, indie rock
- Length: 35:04
- Label: K Records
- Producer: Arion Salazar and Kimya Dawson

Kimya Dawson chronology
| Hidden Vagenda (2004) | Remember That I Love You (2006) | Alphabutt (2008) |

Professional ratings
Aggregate scores
| Source | Rating |
|---|---|
| Metacritic | 78/100 |
Review scores
| Source | Rating |
| AllMusic | 3.5/5 stars |
| Alternative Press | 5/5 |
| Blender | 3.5/5 stars |
| MSN Music (Consumer Guide) | A− |
| NOW Toronto | 4/5 |
| Pitchfork | 6.8/10 |
| PopMatters | 7/10 |
| Spin | 3/5 stars |
| Stylus Magazine | B− |

Remember That I Love You is Kimya Dawson's fifth solo album, released by K Records May 9, 2006. Songs include tour favorites such as "Loose Lips", "12/26", and "I Like Giants". The album art was done by Jeffrey Lewis.

In 2007, the songs "Tire Swing", "Loose Lips," and "My Rollercoaster" were featured in the film Juno.

== Track listing ==
All tracks were written by Kimya Dawson, except where noted.

1. "Tire Swing"
2. "My Mom"
3. "Loose Lips"
4. "Caving In"
5. "Better Weather"
6. "Underground"
7. "I Like Giants"
8. "The Competition"
9. "France" (Kimya Dawson, David-Ivar Herman Düne)
10. "I Miss You"
11. "12/26"
12. "My Rollercoaster"

== Personnel ==
- Kimya Dawson – guitar, vocals, whistling, flute, maracas, castanets, frog, organ
- Paul Baribeau – vocals, keyboard
- Craig Peters - keyboard, vocals
- Matt Tobey – bells, vocals, ukulele
- Scott Yoder - electric guitar, vocals
- Jake Kelly - vocals, violin, mandolin
- Donna Dear - vocals, watermelon
- Saint Abbey - vocals
- Erin Tobey - bells, vocals
- M.J. Geier - vocals
