= Koki vegetable market =

Market in Port Moresby, Papua New Guinea

Koki Vegetable Market
- main entrance
- Location: Papua New Guinea; Port Moresby; 9°28′49″S 147°10′12″E
- Goods sold: vegetables, greens, flowers, sweet potato, taro, fruits, sago, peanuts, onion, tomato
- Interactive map of Koki Vegetable Market

The Koki vegetable market is very close to the seashore and Koki fish market. Near Koki Market, overlooking the beautiful Ela Beach, Koki Market is a cultural venue that reflects the spirit of the grassroots people of Papua New Guinea.

== History ==
The market site was originally aboriginal land. However, it was discovered that the land had never been purchased and remained theirs. The Administration purchased the land from the indigenous people in June 1955. The land, which included 16 acres of land on the coast of Koki and Kaputu, Motu Island, was paid £640. Koki Beach was described as a small market where traders set up shops, which they called "shops" on the beach. The market is located about 2 miles east of the commercial center of Port Moresby, it is located on the shores of what are now Port Moresby and Harbors. It is not certain when trade first began in Koki. One of the earliest European travelers, who stayed in Port Moresby for a few months in 1875 -76, described the area in some detail, but the dint mansion with the name of Koki.

== Weekly trading pattern ==
During the festive season, the market is generally open from Monday to Thursday of each week, except for the period before Christmas. It is only after 3.30pm that the market gets busier, as fishermen bring in their catch of the day and urban workers come to buy food on their way home from work. Fridays and Saturdays are the busiest times at the market. Many vendors are known to arrive at Koki on Friday morning and stay until Sunday afternoon or Monday morning. During the study, it was noted that the number of vendors was higher on people’s paydays than on holidays and Fridays. The market is very crowded on Sunday mornings, as many locals visit the market after attending services at one of the churches in the area. These visits are often for social reasons, such as visiting friends and relatives. While at the market, visitors often buy small items such as betel leaves, a small bunch of peanuts, or oranges.

== Influence of tradition ==
Along with somewhat inflexible prices, trade at Koki vegetable Market also exhibits other characteristics that are left over from the trading practices of prehistoric society. These include the practice of selling food in bundles rather than by weight, and the practice of vendors from a village or tribe sitting in rows or squatting in a specific area of the market, depending on the location of their own villages in Port Moresby. Thus, vendors from Rigo, Marshall Lagoon and Abavu, southeast of Port Moresby, occupy the eastern part of the market, vendors from Kai-Rugu and Bay areas, northwest of Port Moresby, occupy the western part, and vendors from Wanaba, Brown River, Sogeri, northeast of Port Moresby, occupy the northern part.

== See also ==
- Port Moresby
- Koki Fish Market
