= It's the Ones Who've Cracked That the Light Shines Through =

Studio album by Jeffrey Lewis
- Released: August 5, 2003
- Genre: Anti-folk
- Length: 40:32
- Labels: Rough Trade; Don Giovanni Records

Jeffrey Lewis chronology
The Last Time I Did Acid I Went Insane (2001)	It's the Ones Who've Cracked That the Light Shines Through (2003)	City and Eastern Songs (2005)

It's the Ones Who've Cracked That the Light Shines Through is the second album by anti-folk artist Jeffrey Lewis, with Jack Lewis and Anders Griffen. It was released on August 5, 2003, on Rough Trade Records and on vinyl in 2015 on Don Giovanni Records.

== Reception ==
Professional ratings
Review scores
Source	Rating
Allmusic	3/5 stars
Christgau's Consumer Guide	(2-star Honorable Mention)
Exclaim!	favorable
Now	3/5
Pitchfork	3.9/10
Uncut	3/5

"At first, Jeffrey Lewis’ songs seem like jokes. His voice sounds nerdy, the lyrics ramble nonsensically and the guitar chords are the most primitive you've probably heard since grade-school music camp. But stick with it long enough and the payoff comes in smart and detailed narratives that nail the human condition. Lewis made his debut in 2002 with “The Last Time I Did Acid I Went Insane and Other Favorites.” The latest CD, recorded with his brother Jack, on bass, boasts the equally fetching title above. On both records, Lewis’ primitivist music and surreal lyrics recall ‘60s folk satirists the Fugs and David Peel. In fact, the songwriter sprang from the “anti-folk” movement which recalls those East Village performers. Lewis also has a career as an underground comic-book artist. Like his drawings, his music is witty, animated and true." – Jim Farber, New York Daily News, August 9, 2002

"There’s no doubt ‘It’s The Ones Who’ve Cracked That The Light Shines Through’ will end up in Best Of 2003 lists everywhere come the end of the year. Because it really is a genuinely superb record – sharp, dry and wry, it should make Lewis (who's also a comic book writer) famous. And this despite its simple approach to musicianship - mostly it's just Jeffrey and his guitar. Immediately striking is the wit embedded in the opening number, ‘Back When I Was 4’, you'll laugh out loud or die trying not to, and from there on in will be bowled over by some acute observations and unusual warmth. He weaves his tales of growing up particularly well, and such yarns can't help but connect. There are elements of Loudon Wainwright III, Tenacious D and Bright Eyes here, though it's Lewis’ individualism that's really the key. Inspired stuff." - (4 stars of 5) Barfly

"As Bob Dylan proved early in his career, there’s a very fine line between outsider folk and a comedy record. The shaggy dog, talking blues about post-apocalyptic monkeys and farmers’ daughters from Another Side Of may have sunk to the bottom of Dylan's catalog, but their rambunctious goofiness shines on in Jeffrey Lewis, one of a new generation of New York anti-folksters. On his second full-length for Rough Trade, the 27-year-old cartoonist brings his cracking voice to bear on the pressing issues of the age: rampaging ghouls, towers of turtles and the fact that no, he doesn't want to do any acid, thank you. The wackiness of Cracked is charming, but the real highlights of the record are songs where Lewis turns his wide-eyed language on more personal matters. “I hope that the art school enjoys your big painting of ruin,” he sighs on “Alphabet.” “We’ve all got good things to do, and it’s good when we do them.” Packed with these strangely perfect bons mots and buoyed by a heroically unhip sense of wonder, Lewis’ lyrics are as tight as his guitar playing is weak. But so what if his musicianship has all the finesse of a dorm-floor sing-along? Lewis specializes in a rambling, autobiographical style that reassures and entertains more than it startles or amazes. It's good, but not great, and Lewis will likely never quite get around to penning his Blowin' in the Wind or My Back Pages. But the stories on Cracked are bright, funny and warm-hearted. Sometimes, that's more than enough. " - MAGNET

Jeffrey Lewis stated in an interview with Audio Antihero Records that "It seems like a lot of people say that “The Ones Who’ve Cracked” is their preferred album, but to me that one feels too in-between, it's in-between being a lo-fi album and a nicer studio album."

== Track listing ==
1. "Back When I Was 4"
2. "Alphabet"
3. "No LSD Tonight"
4. "Don't Let the Record Label Take You Out to Lunch"
5. "Gold"
6. "Texas"
7. "Sea Song"
8. "Arrow"
9. "Zaster"
10. "If You Shoot the Head You Kill the Ghoul"
11. "I Saw a Hippie Girl on 8th Ave"
12. "Graveyard"
13. "You Don't Have to Be a Scientist to Do Experiments on Your Own Heart"

== Information ==
The album and track title is similar to a lyrics in Leonard Cohen's "Anthem" on his 1992 album The Future. (There is a crack in everything / That's how the light gets in. ) Lewis also references Cohen in his track "The Chelsea Hotel Oral Sex Song".
