= City and Eastern Songs =

Studio album by Jeffrey Lewis and Jack Lewis
- Released: 2005
- Genre: Anti-folk
- Length: 37:44
- Label: Rough Trade
- Producer: Mark Kramer and Jeffrey Lewis

Jeffrey Lewis and Jack Lewis chronology
It's the Ones Who've Cracked That the Light Shines Through (2003)	City and Eastern Songs (2005)	12 Crass Songs (2007)

Professional ratings
Review scores
Source	Rating
TheMusicZine	(?)
AllMusic	3.5/5 stars
Being There Magazine	4/5 stars

City and Eastern Songs is the third album by anti-folk artist Jeffrey Lewis, though is credited to Jeffrey & Jack Lewis, Jeffrey's brother. Though Jack Lewis had contributed vocals, bass and songwriting to Jeffrey's two previous albums, this is the first instance in which he was given equal billing on the cover. The album was released in 2005 on Rough Trade Records and produced by Kramer.

== Track listing ==
1. "Posters"
2. "Don't Be Upset"
3. "Williamsburg Will Oldham Horror"
4. "Something Good"
5. "The Singing Tree"
6. "Anxiety Attack"
7. "Time Machine"
8. "Moving"
9. "Art Land"
10. "New Old Friends"
11. "They Always Knew"
12. "Had It All"
