= My Cute Fiend Sweet Princess =

Studio album by Kimya Dawson
- Released: September 29, 2003
- Genres: Anti-folk, indie rock
- Length: 33:05
- Label: Important Records

Kimya Dawson chronology
I'm Sorry That Sometimes I'm Mean (2002)	My Cute Fiend Sweet Princess (2003)	Hidden Vagenda (2004)

Professional ratings
Review scores
Source	Rating
AllMusic	3/5 stars
The Rolling Stone Album Guide	3.5/5 stars
The Village Voice	A–

My Cute Fiend Sweet Princess is Kimya Dawson's third solo album, released concurrently with Knock Knock Who? in 2003.

== Track listing ==
1. "Chemistry"
2. "Velvet Rabbit"
3. "Hadlock Padlock"
4. "Being Cool"
5. "Anthrax"
6. "The Beer"
7. "Will You Be Me?"
8. "Everything's Alright"
9. "For Katie"
