= Hokey Fright =

Studio album by The Uncluded
- Released: May 7, 2013
- Recorded: 2012–13
- Genre: Folk rock; hip-hop
- Length: 55:21
- Label: Rhymesayers

Aesop Rock chronology
Skelethon (2012)	Hokey Fright (2013)	Bestiary (2014)

Kimya Dawson chronology
Thunder Thighs (2011)	Hokey Fright (2013)

Hokey Fright is the only studio album by American indie folk rap duo The Uncluded. It was released on May 7, 2013 via Rhymesayers Entertainment. Every part of every song on the album is performed by either Aesop Rock or Kimya Dawson, with the exception of the drums on "Delicate Cycle", which were played by James McNew of Yo La Tengo.

The album debuted at number 93 on the Billboard 200 albums chart, with 5,000 units sold in its first-week.

== Critical reception ==
Professional ratings
Aggregate scores
Source	Rating
Metacritic	79/100
Review scores
Source	Rating
AllMusic	3.5/5 stars
Consequence of Sound	C+
Exclaim!	6/10
MSN Music (Expert Witness)	A
Paste	8.2/10
PopMatters	9/10 stars
RapReviews	7/10
Spectrum Culture	3.25/5
Spin	3/10

Hokey Fright was met with generally favourable reviews from music critics. At Metacritic, which assigns a normalized rating out of 100 to reviews from mainstream publications, the album received an average score of 79 based on nine reviews.

Robert Christgau of MSN Music gave the album the highest score, resuming: "the tunes are Dawson's because Aesop Rock doesn't do tunes, but his beats beef up those tunes just like his gruff, clotted flow beefs up her itty-bitty soprano". Dave Heaton of PopMatters stated: "as the album moves forward, the number of moments, musical and lyrical, that sneak up on you and tear you apart increases". James Joiner of Paste concluded: "the blending of their styles creates an alchemy that is intensely personal and oddly alluring". AllMusic's David Jeffries wrote: "expect the expected with plenty of xylophones, campfire guitars, and Dawson's breathy cuteness mixing with Aesop's serious severity, but expect to be thrown as well, mostly by ideas of community and how strangers can leave lifelong impressions". Nick Freed of Consequence of Sound found "the short interludes ("Superheros" and "WYHUOM") break the album's pace and hold back some of the flow. Overall, though, the combination of Rock and Dawson is undeniably addictive".

In his mixed review for Exclaim!, Thomas Quinlan wrote: "it's evident that the two were having a good time recording Hokey Fright, and though the album isn't always successful, it's encouraging to see creative individuals ignore genre boundaries in order to bridge gaps". On the other hand, Spin staff gave the album 3 out of 10, summing up with: "Aesop Rock's exhausted abstract rap goes on a no-chemistry date with Kimya Dawson's beyond-tedious twee".

=== Accolades ===
Publication	List	Rank	Ref.
PopMatters	The 75 Best Albums of 2013	74	
The Barnes & Noble Review	The 2013 Dean's List	2	

Robert Christgau ranked it as the twelfth best album of the 2010s. It was listed by Rolling Stone as one of the "27 Best Albums You Didn't Hear in 2013".

== Track listing ==
All tracks are written by Ian Bavitz and Kimya Dawson.

No.	Title	Length
1.	"Kryptonite"	1:18
2.	"Delicate Cycle"	4:15
3.	"TV on 10"	3:23
4.	"Earthquake"	2:05
5.	"Organs"	3:14
6.	"Superheroes"	0:38
7.	"Jambi Cafe"	3:13
8.	"Bats"	6:46
9.	"Scissorhands"	2:41
10.	"Eyeball Soup"	2:32
11.	"Aquarium"	3:50
12.	"Teleprompters"	5:00
13.	"Alligator"	3:27
14.	"WYHUOM"	3:17
15.	"Boomerang"	4:32
16.	"Tits Up"	5:17
Total length:		55:21

Deluxe version bonus tracks
No.	Title	Length
17.	"Oooooooooo"	2:36
18.	"That Cat Has Worms" (Blockhead Remix)	2:20

== Personnel ==
- Ian "Aesop Rock" Bavitz – songwriter, performer, recording, executive producer
- Kimya Dawson – songwriter, performer, recording, executive producer
- James McNew – drums (track 2)
- Joey Raia – mixing
- John Greenham – mastering
- Brent Sayers – executive producer
- Sean "Slug" Daley – executive producer
- Travis Millard – artwork, layout
- Jason Cook – coordinator
- Skye Rossi – coordinator

== Charts ==
Chart (2013)	Peak position
US Billboard 200	93
US Top Alternative Albums (Billboard)	17
US Top Rap Albums (Billboard)	8
US Independent Albums (Billboard)	19
