= 'Em Are I =

Studio album by Jeffrey Lewis & the Junkyard
- Released: April 20, 2009
- Genre: Anti-folk
- Length: 37:44
- Label: Rough Trade

Jeffrey Lewis & the Junkyard chronology
12 Crass Songs (2007)	'Em Are I (2009)	A Turn In The Dream-Songs (2011)

'Em Are I is the fifth album by anti-folk artist Jeffrey Lewis, and the first credited to Jeffrey Lewis & the Junkyard (Lewis' backing band). Lewis revealed the following in an interview with Audio Antihero Records.

'Em Are I is probably the one I feel best about as a representation of a well thought-out studio album, where I had the time to get things a bit more how I wanted them instead of just ending up with what I got accidentally. I think the "Mini-Theme" track at the end of 'Em Are I is just about the best song recording I've managed to do, I'm very happy with how that came out.

— Jeffrey Lewis,

Professional ratings
Aggregate scores
Source	Rating
Metacritic	78/100
Review scores
Source	Rating
Allmusic	4.5/5 stars
DIY	4/5 stars
Drowned in Sound	8/10
The Guardian	4/5 stars
MSN Music	A−
NME	7/10
Pitchfork	6.3/10
PopMatters	7/10
Spin	3.5/5 stars

== Track listing ==
- CD RTRADCD514, LP RTRADLP514
1. "Slogans"
2. "Roll Bus Roll"
3. "If Life Exists"
4. "Broken Broken Broken Heart"
5. "Whistle Past The Graveyard"
6. "To Be Objectified"
7. "The Upside-down Cross"
8. "Bugs & Flowers"
9. "Good Old Pig, Gone To Avalon"
10. "It's Not Impossible"
11. "Mini-Theme: Moocher From The Future"
