= The Bundles (album) =

Studio album by The Bundles
- Released: March 9, 2010
- Recorded: February 2009, Dub Narcotic Studios, Olympia, WA
- Genre: Anti-folk
- Length: 38:14
- Label: K Records

The Bundles is the only studio album by the supergroup of the same name, released on March 9, 2010 on K Records.

== Background and recording ==
Fellow anti-folk artists Jeffrey Lewis and Kimya Dawson first met in 2001, and created their first five songs that year. Lewis' brother, Jack, Washington-based musician Karl Blau and drummer Anders Griffen soon joined them in the songwriting and recording process. Half of the songs on The Bundles were previously released on the Lewis-Dawson collaboration "AFNY Collaborations Volume I" in 2002, but the versions on that album differed significantly from those on The Bundles because on the latter record, unlike on the former, they were recorded with The Bundles' new band.

== Reception ==
Professional ratings
Aggregate scores
Source	Rating
Metacritic	58/100
Review scores
Source	Rating
AllMusic	2/5 stars
Drowned in Sound	7/10
MSN Music (Consumer Guide)	A–
NME	7/10
Pitchfork	5.0/10
PopMatters	6/10
Tiny Mix Tapes	3/5 stars

The album received mixed reviews from critics; with aggregator site Metacritic giving it a score of 58%, indicating "mixed or average reviews". Negative reviews included one written for Allmusic by K. Ross Hoffman, who awarded the album just two (out of five) stars and concluded that "...these Bundles may be best left unwrapped." Among the most positive reviews was Robert Christgau's, in which he gave the album an A− and wrote that "...this is where Jeffrey Lewis replaces Adam Green in the Moldy Peaches...," while Jude Rogers gave the album a lukewarm review, writing that "these songs sound meatier than the members’ previous efforts" but also concluding that "it's a shame that this album’s playfulness very often comes across, as pretentiousness." The album was also praised by the Independent's Simmy Richman, who described its songs as "utterly charming and fall[ing on] just the right side of twee - think late-period Velvet Underground if Moe Tucker had had equal billing to Lou Reed." A more moderate review came from Drowned in Sound's Mark Ward, who wrote that "...if you love Dawson or Lewis, you’re likely to love The Bundles, although you’re unlikely to be surprised by the contents of their debut album."

== Track listing ==
1. A Common Chorus
2. Pirates Declare War
3. Klutter
4. Shamrock Glamrock
5. Over the Moon
6. Ishalicious
7. In the Beginning
8. Desert Bundles
9. Metal Mouth
10. Be Yourselves

== Personnel ==
- Karl Blau—Group Member, Jaw Harp, Piano, Saxophone, Vocals
- Kimya Dawson—Group Member, Keyboards, Vocals
- Anders Griffen—Drums, Group Member, Percussion, Vocals
- Jack Lewis—Bass, Group Member, Vocals
- Jeffrey Lewis—Group Member, Guitar, Liner Notes, Vocals
