= Margot at the Wedding =

2007 film by Noah Baumbach

- Theatrical release poster
- Directed by: Noah Baumbach
- Written by: Noah Baumbach
- Produced by: Scott Rudin
- Starring: Nicole Kidman; Jennifer Jason Leigh; Jack Black; John Turturro; Ciarán Hinds
- Cinematography: Harris Savides
- Edited by: Carol Littleton
- Production company: Scott Rudin Productions
- Distributed by: Paramount Vantage
- Release dates: August 31, 2007 (Telluride); December 4, 2007 (United States)
- Running time: 93 minutes
- Country: United States
- Language: English
- Budget: $10 million
- Box office: $2.9 million

Margot at the Wedding is a 2007 American comedy-drama film written and directed by Noah Baumbach. It stars Nicole Kidman, Jennifer Jason Leigh, Jack Black, John Turturro, and Ciarán Hinds. The film is about the familial storm that arises when Margot, a writer, comes to visit her sister Pauline on the eve of the latter's wedding.

The film premiered at the 34th Telluride Film Festival on August 31, 2007, and was released in the United States on December 7, 2007, by Paramount Vantage.

== Plot ==
Margot is a successful writer with emotional problems; it is suggested that she has borderline personality disorder. She brings her 11-year-old son Claude to spend a weekend visiting her sister Pauline on the eve of the latter's wedding to Malcolm at their home on Long Island, New York.

Margot disapproves of Pauline's choice of fiancé: Malcolm is an unsuccessful, unstable musician whom Margot considers "completely unattractive." While in town for the wedding, Margot also plans to be interviewed in public in a local bookstore by Dick Koosman, a successful author with whom she is collaborating on a screenplay. Dick's teenage daughter Maisy also visits the house.

Margot and Pauline have an uneasy relationship. Margot disapproves of Pauline's life choices—besides marrying Malcolm, she is pregnant, a fact she has not shared with Malcolm or her pre-teen daughter Ingrid. Pauline, meanwhile, resents Margot for writing and publishing thinly disguised stories about her life and blames her for the break-up of Pauline's first marriage. She is also incensed when Margot shares secrets told to her in confidence, including that of her pregnancy. Rather than confront each other, Pauline and Margot take out their frustrations on Malcolm and Claude, respectively.

Tensions come to a head twice. Firstly, Margot's interview goes disastrously wrong when Dick's questions become personal. Then, when Pauline interrogates Malcolm about emails he received from one of her 20-year-old students, he admits he kissed Maisy. Returning to the house, Pauline finds Maisy inside. Although she says nothing, it is obvious to Maisy that Pauline knows the truth. When Maisy forestalls exposure by telling her arriving father, he chases and beats Malcolm.

Margot urges Pauline to cancel the wedding, and the two sisters get into a heated argument, unleashing years of resentment. Following a climactic moment, the women leave with their children, leaving Malcolm behind. Coming to believe that she has made a mess of her own family life, Margot wants to put Claude on a bus to Vermont to live with his father; she asks Pauline to accompany him, but Pauline rejects her plan.

The next day, Pauline calls Malcolm, intent on breaking up with him, at Margot's insistence; but, when he begs for forgiveness, she gives in and takes him back. Pauline does not admit this to Margot, but it is obvious to her. Margot's and Pauline's other sister, and their elderly mother, turn up unexpectedly, but Margot ignores her family and rushes Claude to the bus stop.

Claude begs his mother to accompany him to Vermont, but she says no. As the bus pulls away, Margot has a change of heart and chases after it, forcing the driver to stop, and climbing aboard.

== Cast ==
- Nicole Kidman as Margot
- Jennifer Jason Leigh as Pauline
- Jack Black as Malcolm
- John Turturro as Jim
- Ciarán Hinds as Dick Koosman
- Zane Pais as Claude
- Flora Cross as Ingrid
- Halley Feiffer as Maisy Koosman
- Seth Barrish as Toby
- Michael Cullen as Mr. Volger
- Enid Graham as Mrs. Volger

== Production ==
Noah Baumbach originally wanted to title the film Nicole at the Beach, in reference to French New Wave director Éric Rohmer's Pauline at the Beach (1983). The title was changed when Nicole Kidman was cast. During filming, Kidman, Jennifer Jason Leigh, Zane Pais, and Jack Black lived in a house together in order to perfect the roles of a dysfunctional family.

Of her character Margot, Kidman said, "I hope you see that the spikiness and the guardedness and the anger is actually a manifestation of her need to protect herself. She's not in a safe place, really, because her sister doesn't know how to take care of her, and she doesn't know how to take care of her sister...They feel like they should be very, very close, but they actually do not bring out the best in each other."

Margot at the Wedding was shot from April to June 2006 in various New York locations, including Shelter Island, Hampton Bays, East Quogue, Long Island, Staten Island and City Island in the Bronx.

== Soundtrack ==
Dean Wareham and Britta Phillips acted as the film's music consultants, and the film "features the more obscure singer-songwriters that Baumbach is obsessed with...like [1970s] post-Dylan folkie Steve Forbert, British singer-songwriter and occasional Pink Floyd guest Lesley Duncan, Brooklyn-born singer-songwriter Evie Sands (covered both Beck and Beth Orton) and New York anti-folk artist Diane Cluck."

- "Northern Blue" by Dean Wareham and Britta Phillips
- "Romeo's Tune" by Steve Forbert
- "Go Tell Aunt Rhody" performed by Jack Black
- "Genesis" by Jorma Kaukonen
- "One Fine Summer Morning" performed by Evie Sands
- "Goin' Down to Laurel" by Steve Forbert
- "The Wagon" by Dinosaur Jr.
- "Dear Mary" by Steve Miller Band
- "See How We Are" performed by X
- "Sunday Girl" performed by Zane Pais
- "Everything Changes" by Lesley Duncan
- "Union City Blue" by Blondie
- "You and Me" by Alice Cooper
- "Clair" by Gilbert O'Sullivan
- "Easy to Be Around" by Diane Cluck
- "Nothing Is Wrong" performed by the dB's
- "That's All for Everyone" by Fleetwood Mac
- "On and On" performed by Michael Medeiros
- "Teen Angel" by Donovan
- "Something on Your Mind" performed by Karen Dalton

== Release and reception ==
Margot at the Wedding premiered at the 34th Telluride Film Festival on August 31, 2007. It was also shown at the Toronto International Film Festival, the New York Film Festival, and the Mill Valley Film Festival. The film was given a limited theatrical release in the United States on November 16, 2007. It opened in Australia on February 21, 2008, and in the United Kingdom on February 28, 2008.

The film grossed $2 million in the United States and Canada and a total of $2.9 million worldwide.

=== Critical response ===
On the review aggregator website Rotten Tomatoes, the film holds an approval rating of 51% based on 167 reviews, with an average rating of 5.7/10. The website's critics consensus reads, "Despite a great cast, the characters in Margot at the Wedding are too unlikable to enthrall viewers." Metacritic, which uses a weighted average, assigned the film a score of 66 out of 100, based on 37 critics, indicating "generally favorable" reviews.

A positive review in The Guardian compared the film to the director's previous film, stating: "Margot at the Wedding, [is] an intelligent, subtle new movie by American writer-director Noah Baumbach, who made a considerable impression three years ago with The Squid and the Whale, his first film to reach this country. The Squid was a witty, affecting, and painfully truthful account of two teenagers reacting to the separation of their parents, both writers living in New York, the father a pompous novelist whose once considerable career is in freefall, the mother a writer whose reputation is rapidly rising. Margot at the Wedding, less sharply focused than its predecessor, explores similar territory in an equally allusive and indirect way."

Todd McCarthy of Variety wrote, "Kidman is the rawest as the most dangerously neurotic and manipulative of the bunch, Leigh the most prone to mood swings, while Black, whose character is not yet a family insider – more luck to him – works in a mode of emotional opaqueness that itself may mask the man's intense neuroses. Newcomer Pais is very good as the son who learns way too much too fast."

=== Accolades ===
| Award | Category | Recipient(s) | Result | Ref. |
|---|---|---|---|---|
| Chicago Film Critics Association Awards | Best Supporting Actress | Jennifer Jason Leigh | Nominated | |
| Satellite Award | Satellite Award for Best Actress – Motion Picture Musical or Comedy | Nicole Kidman | Nominated | |
| Satellite Award | Satellite Award for Best Film – Musical or Comedy | Noah Baumbach | Nominated | |
| Independent Spirit Award | Independent Spirit Award for Best Supporting Female | Jennifer Jason Leigh | Nominated | |
| Gotham Awards | Best Ensemble Cast | Cast | Nominated | |
| Gotham Awards | Best Feature | Noah Baumbach | Nominated | |
| Peñíscola Comedy Film Festival | Best Actress | Jennifer Jason Leigh | Won | |
| Peñíscola Comedy Film Festival | Best Director | Noah Baumbach | Won | |
