= Koki Fish Market =

Market in Port Moresby, Papua New Guinea

- Front view
- Location: Papua New Guinea; Port Moresby; 9°28′57″S 147°10′12″E
- Parking: Available
- Interactive map of Koki Fish Market

The Koki Fish Market is the main market for Papuan produce in Port Moresby and a major center for tribal community activities.

== History ==
Koki was a traditional meeting and trading place by pre-war Papuan military officers, and trade had been taking place on Koki Beach for many years. When Koki was first settled in 1935, native fishermen sometimes pulled their boats onto the beach and sold their catch to the townspeople. In 1950, the then Minister for Overseas Territories, Mr. B. C. Spender, referred to the Koki fish Market as a way to decongest the traditionally dangerous coastal area from boats coming and going along the coast. Since 1951, it has been located on the shores of what are now Port Moresby and Harbors city.

== Transport ==
Koki probably became a market site because it was a convenient place for fishermen to sell their catch from boats on the beach. However, surveys show only 11 percent of wholesale vendors came to Koki by boat.

== Stilt Village ==
The Stilt village of Koki fish Market showcases traditional Papua New Guinean architecture.

== Fish Marketing services ==
Local fishermen sell seafood, accepting only cash. On-site cleaning and preparation services are available.

== See also ==
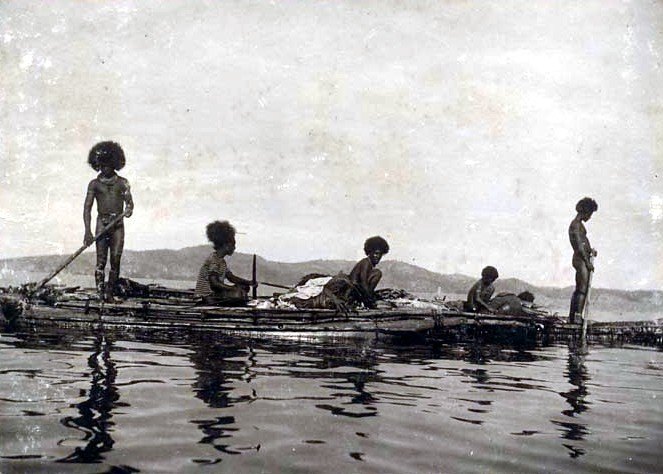
Papuan men on a trading or fishing canoe, Port Moresby, British New Guinea

- Papua New Guinea
- Port Moresby
- Koki Vegetable Market

== Gallery ==
Port Moresby stilt village

side view

sea view

shops

fish cleaning area

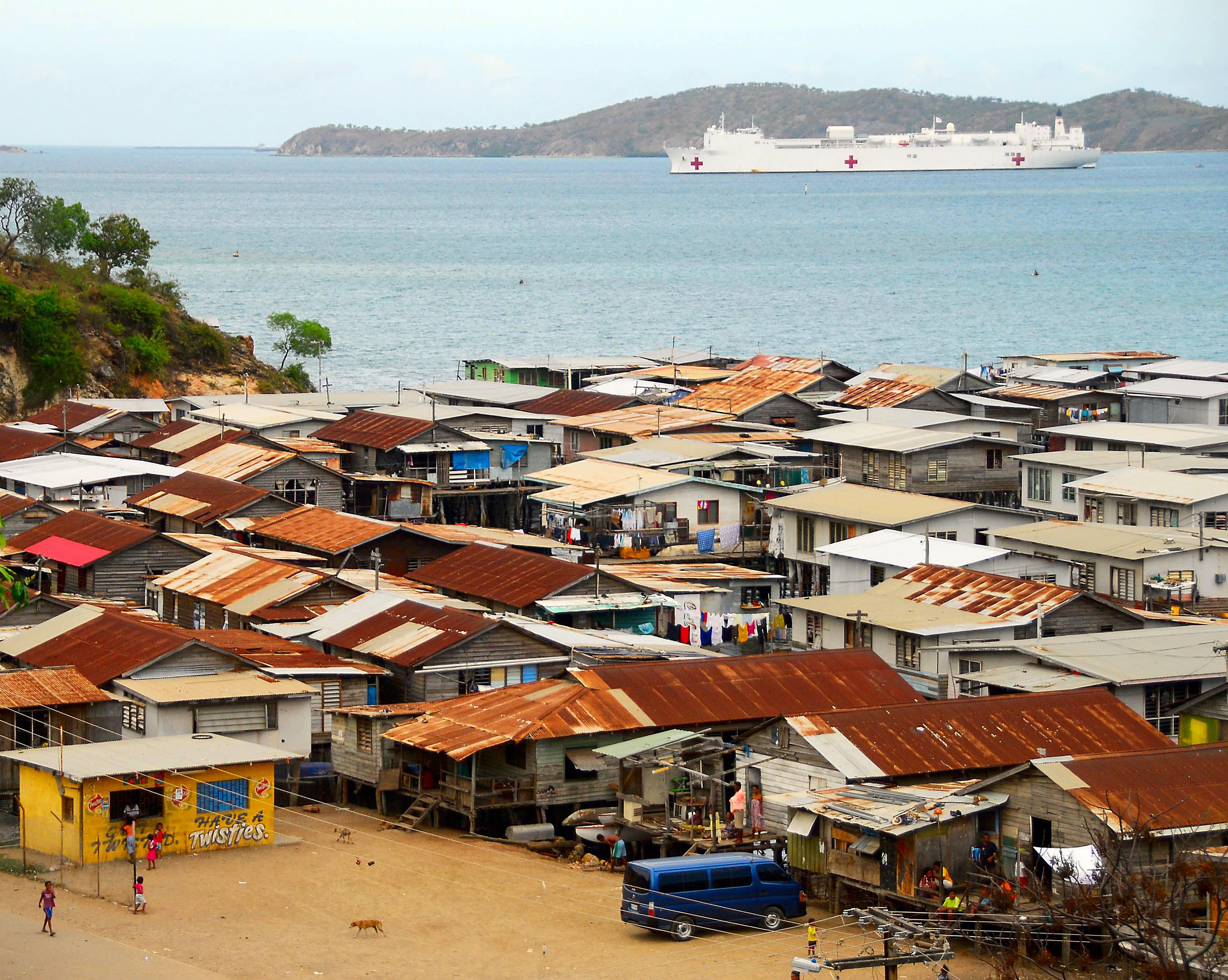
old stilt house
