= 12 Crass Songs =

Studio album by Jeffrey Lewis
- Released: October 1, 2007
- Genre: Folk punk, anti-folk
- Label: Rough Trade

Jeffrey Lewis chronology
City and Eastern Songs (2005)	12 Crass Songs (2007)	'Em Are I (2009)

Professional ratings
Review scores
Source	Rating
AllMusic	4/5 stars
The Guardian	4/5 stars
Kevchino	(8/10)
NME	(7/10)
Pitchfork	(2.3/10)
PopMatters	8/10 stars
Robert Christgau	C−
Rocklouder	4/5 stars

12 Crass Songs is the fourth album by anti-folk artist Jeffrey Lewis. It was released on October 1, 2007 on Rough Trade Records. The title is literal, as all 12 songs on the album were written and first recorded by the band Crass.

== Track listing ==
1. "End Result"
2. "I Ain't Thick, It's Just a Trick"
3. "Systematic Death"
4. "The Gasman Cometh"
5. "Banned from the Roxy"
6. "Where Next Columbus?"
7. "Do They Owe Us a Living?"
8. "Securicor"
9. "Demoncrats"
10. "Big A, Little A"
11. "Punk Is Dead"
12. "Walls (Fun in the Oven)"

== Origin ==
In a 2013 interview with Audio Antihero Records, Jeffrey Lewis explained his motivation for the album:

I do love Crass, and I also wanted some of those songs to be enjoyable to people who don’t only want to listen to early 80s hardcore punk. At a certain period in history it might have been crucial for Crass to get those songs across by tying them to a certain attitude and style, but in a different period that attitude and style becomes a barrier to the songs, it holds the songs back instead of pushing the songs onwards. Not everything is like that – I mean, nobody needs to do an album of indie-rock versions of Led Zeppelin songs, but Crass has such an extreme case of extreme style AND extreme substance, I wanted to see what the substance could do if it was removed from the style. In Led Zeppelin the style and the substance sort of have to go hand in hand, and if you mess with that then you’re just creating a joke, like Dred Zeppelin, or those lounge covers of Stairway to Heaven, etc., etc. The original Crass recordings are totally great and impossible to make any better, but the substance is strong enough to outlive that. Songs of moral rebellion are great, people all over the world sing Bob Marley songs and Bob Dylan songs and Woody Guthrie songs and stuff like that, there’s no reason why they shouldn’t sing Crass songs too.
