= Diane Cluck =

American singer-songwriter

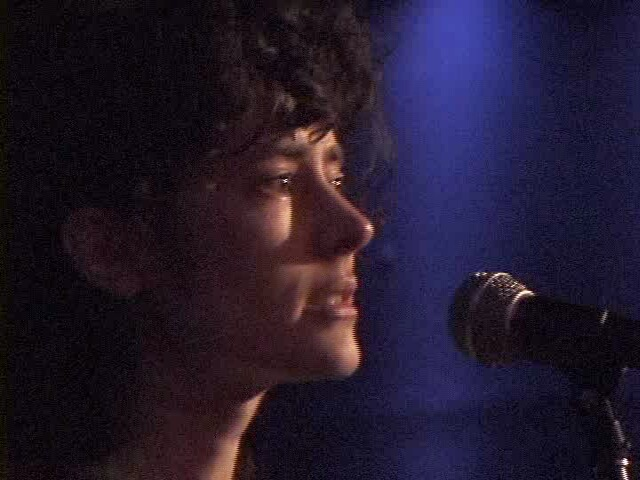
- Diane Cluck in 2002

Background information
- Genres: Intuitive Folk, Anti-folk, Freak Folk
- Occupation: Singer-songwriter
- Instrument: Multi-instrumentalist
- Years active: 2000–present
- Labels: Self-published, with past distribution by Important, Voodoo-Eros & Very Friendly
- Website: dianecluck.info

Diane Cluck is an American singer-songwriter. She describes her music as "intuitive folk". She currently resides in Virginia.

== Early life ==
Cluck was raised in Lancaster, Pennsylvania. She began taking piano lessons at the age of 7, and was classically trained on scholarship at the Pennsylvania Academy of Music. She is of Irish descent on her father's side.

== Music ==
Cluck began performing her songs publicly in New York City in 2000. She self-released her first solo album, Diane Cluck, that same year. By 2001, she was appearing regularly at the SideWalk Cafe in New York's Lower East Side, a venue that has featured such artists as Jeffrey Lewis, Regina Spektor, and Kimya Dawson. Massachusetts-based record label Important Records distributed Cluck's second and third albums, Macy's Day Bird in 2001 and Black With Green Leaves in 2002. Also in 2002, her song "Monte Carlo" was included in a compilation of New York City anti-folk music, Anti-folk Vol. 1, released by British label Rough Trade Records.

She wrote most of her fourth album, Oh Vanille / ova nil, while staying at the Dorland Mountain Arts Colony in Temecula, California, in 2003. The album was distributed in 2004 by Important Records, and subsequently reissued on 180g audiophile vinyl pressed by 3 Syllables Records in 2010. Her fifth album, Countless Times, was distributed by Voodoo-Eros in 2005, and her sixth album, Monarcana, 2001–2004, was distributed in 2006 by Very Friendly.

Although known as a solo performer, she has often collaborated with others, including Jeffrey Lewis, CocoRosie, Toby Goodshank, Herman Düne, and, recently, drummer Anders Griffen and cellist Isabel Castellvi on tours in the US, UK, and Europe.

In December 2011, she announced a fan-funded "Song-of-the-Week" project, in which she has been writing and distributing a series of 24 new songs directly to subscribers.

In March 2014, Cluck released her seventh album, Boneset, her first in eight years, on 10" vinyl, CD, and digitally, laid out "Dark to light to dark, the album overends as a mobius strip, its songs seeded with connection and release, overcoming fear with heart...birds, bones, surrender," which NPR Music described as "as thrilling a showcase of Cluck's clawed, counterintuitive fingerpicking and elastic voice as anything she's ever released."

In early 2014, Cluck embarked on a tour of the US, Ireland, the UK, and Europe. She released and co-directed her first official music video for Boneset's first single, "Sara".

=== Style ===
Shawn Bosler of The Village Voice wrote that "she is likely one of the most refined and elegant songwriters in all of neo-folkdom. A brilliant idiosyncratic guitarist, a witty and wise lyricist, an imaginative melody writer with a powerful voice; her dark and introspective tunes are utterly captivating, sorta like an earthier Kate Bush. Watch her spellbind the room."

David Garland of NPR Music described her sound as "an unlikely mix of Aaron Neville, the Baka people, and Joni Mitchell." Praising Cluck's singing for being "unaffected yet unusual", he notes that she "handles her guitar in a distinctive way, often plucking the strings where the neck meets the body of the guitar, producing a harp-like tone."

== Discography ==
Albums

- Diane Cluck – 2000 (self-released)
- Macy's Day Bird – 2001 (distributed by Important Records)
- Black With Green Leaves – 2002 (distributed by Important Record)
- Oh Vanille/Ova Nil – 2003 (distributed by Important Records)
- Countless Times – 2005 (distributed by Voodoo-Eros)
- Monarcana, 2001–2004 – 2006 (distributed by Very Friendly)
- Oh Vanille/Ova Nil 180g audiophile vinyl – 2010 (reissue with previously unreleased tracks, pressed and printed by 3 Syllables Records, mastered by Ray Staff)
- Boneset – 2014 (distributed by Bone & Bloom Publishing)
- Common Wealth – 2020
- House Tears – 2025

Collaborations (incomplete list)

- Travel Light, The River, Finish Line – 2001 – With Jeffrey Lewis
- So Not What I Wanted – With Herman Düne
- To Live Like the Boys – With Herman Düne
- Palam & Porom – 2005 – With Toby Goodshank
- tremenda – 2005 – With Sierra Casady (on Les Disque Du Crespuscule (The Black and White Skins))
- Noah's Ark – 2005 – Contributed to CocoRosie album
- Tell Me to Stay (vocals) – 2009 – by Stanley Brinks

Compilation appearance

- AFNY Collaborations Volume 1 (Olive Juice Music) – 2001 – With Jeffrey Lewis and Kimya Dawson
- Antifolk Vol. 1 (Rough Trade) – 2002 – Monte Carlo
- The Golden Apples of the Sun – 2004 – Heat From Every Corner
- The Enlightened Family: A Collection Of Lost Songs – 2005 – Real Good Time and Nothing But God
- Rough Trade Shops: Singer Songwriter 1 – 2006 – Easy to be Around
- So Much Fire to Roast Human Flesh – 2006 – A Phoenix and Doves
- From Colette With Love – 2006 – Real Good Time
- Anticomp Folkilation – 2007 – The River – With Jeffrey Lewis
- Margot at the Wedding OST – 2007 – Easy to be Around
- Skins – 2011 – Petite Roses
- Audio Antihero presents: REGAL VS STEAMBOAT for Rape Crisis – 2013 – Content to Reform (Montreal Studio Version)
