= Paul Baribeau =

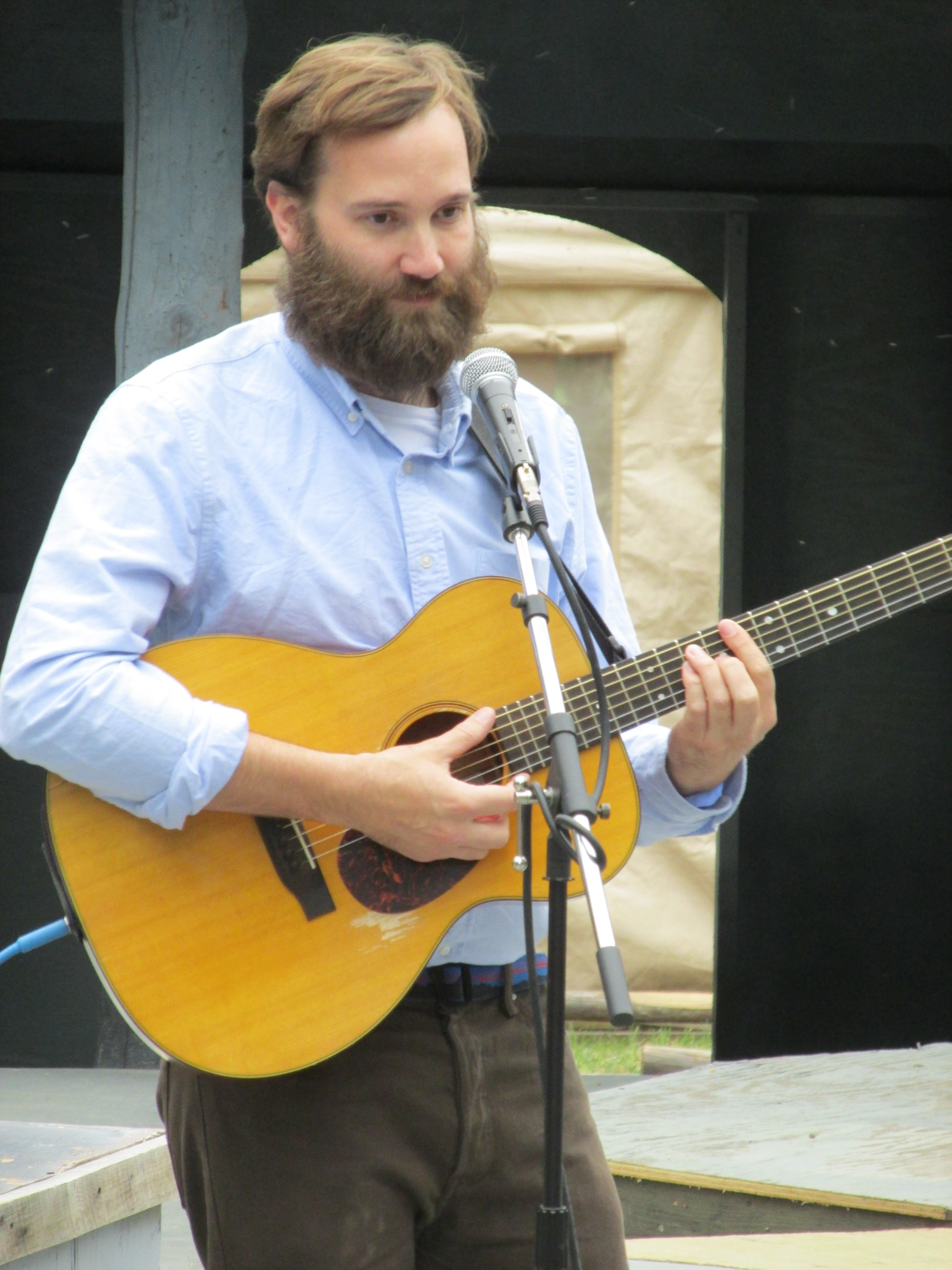
- Paul Baribeau performing at the University of Alaska Fairbanks in June 2014.

Background information
- Born: 1981 (age 44–45)
- Origin: Grand Ledge, Michigan, U.S.
- Genres: Folk punk, lo-fi music
- Occupations: Singer-songwriter, artist, writer
- Instruments: Vocals, guitar
- Years active: 2004–present
- Labels: Plan-It-X, No Idea

Paul Baribeau is an American folk punk singer-songwriter from Grand Ledge, Michigan. He was signed to the independent record label Plan-It-X Records. His self-titled debut album was released on Plan-It-X Records in January 2004. In 2006, he embarked on a tour with Ginger Alford of Good Luck in which they collaboratively covered Bruce Springsteen songs. They subsequently released an album on No Idea Records, Darkness on the Edge of Your Town Tour, which contains studio and live versions of these covers. His second album of original material, Grand Ledge, was released on Plan-It-X Records in June 2007. Grand Ledge was recorded in a barn belonging to a friend of Baribeau's father, in Grand Ledge, Michigan. Baribeau's most recent album under his own name, Unbearable, was released on No Idea Records on March 10, 2010. He was referenced in Kimya Dawson's song "Tire Swing," from her album Remember That I Love You, which was used in the Juno (soundtrack).

Since 2015, Baribeau has been releasing more electronic focused music under the pseudonym of New Boy. His latest EP, Blue Maze was released in August 2020.

According to a 2011 article in inWeekly, he lives in Bloomington, Indiana and follows a straight edge lifestyle.

== Critical reception ==
The punk music website AbsolutePunk praised Baribeau's album Unbearable and described it as "beautiful in the sense that it's crisp and clear." The website Punknews.org positively reviewed Grand Ledge, mentioning that Baribeau's lyrics were "often heartbreaking and always honest."

== Discography ==
- Paul Baribeau (January 2004) on Plan-It-X Records
- Darkness on the Edge of Your Town Tour (2006) on No Idea Records
- 25 (4 July 2006)
- Grand Ledge (June 2007) on Plan-It-X Records
- Unbearable (March 2010) on No Idea Records
- new boy (2015) (as New Boy)
- FLIRTS (2016) (as New Boy)
- Blue Maze (2020) (as New Boy)
