= The Last Time I Did Acid I Went Insane =

Studio album by Jeffrey Lewis
- Released: September 3, 2001
- Genre: Anti-folk, folk punk
- Length: 40:19
- Label: Rough Trade; Don Giovanni
- Producer: Whip, Jeffrey Lewis, Spencer Chakedis

Jeffrey Lewis chronology
| The Last Time I Did Acid I Went Insane (2001) | It's the Ones Who've Cracked That the Light Shines Through (2003) |

Professional ratings
Review scores
| Source | Rating |
|---|---|
| AllMusic | 4/5 stars |
| Christgau's Consumer Guide | (1-star Honorable Mention) |
| Entertainment Weekly | B+ |
| NME | 6/10 |

The Last Time I Did Acid I Went Insane and Other Favorites is the first album by anti-folk artist Jeffrey Lewis. It was released on CD in 2001 on Rough Trade Records and on vinyl in 2012 on Don Giovanni Records.

== Track listing ==
1. "The East River"
2. "Another Girl"
3. "Seattle"
4. "The Chelsea Hotel Oral Sex Song"
5. "Amanda Is a Scalape"
6. "Heavy Heart"
7. "The Last Time I Did Acid I Went Insane"
8. "The Man with the Golden Arm"
9. "Springtime"
10. "Life"
