= Bad Wiring =

2019 album by Jeffrey Lewis

Studio album by Jeffrey Lewis & the Voltage
- Released: November 1, 2019
- Genres: Anti-folk, indie rock
- Length: 41:31
- Labels: Don Giovanni, Moshi Moshi
- Producer: Roger Moutenot

Jeffrey Lewis & the Voltage chronology
13 Fall Songs (2018)	Bad Wiring (2019)	Both Ways (2021)

Bad Wiring is an album by American anti-folk musician Jeffrey Lewis, credited to Jeffrey Lewis and the Voltage. The album was released on November 1, 2019 on Don Giovanni Records in the United States and Australia, and on Moshi Moshi Records in the United Kingdom and mainland Europe. It was recorded in Nashville, Tennessee, and produced by Roger Moutenot, who is best known for producing multiple highly regarded albums by indie rock band Yo La Tengo.

Professional ratings
Aggregate scores
Source	Rating
Metacritic	80/100
Review scores
Source	Rating
AllMusic	4/5 stars
And It Don't Stop	A–
Hot Press	8/10
Loud and Quiet	8/10
Louder than War	9/10
The Skinny	4/5 stars

== Track listing ==
1. Exactly What Nobody Wanted
2. Except for the Fact That It Isn’t
3. My Girlfriend Doesn’t Worry
4. Depression! Despair!
5. Till Question Marks Are Told
6. LPs
7. Knucklehead/Happy Rain
8. Take It for Granted
9. In Certain Orders
10. Where Is the Machine
11. Dogs of My Neighborhood
12. Not Supposed to Be Wise
