= Kimya Dawson =

American folk singer-songwriter (born 1972)

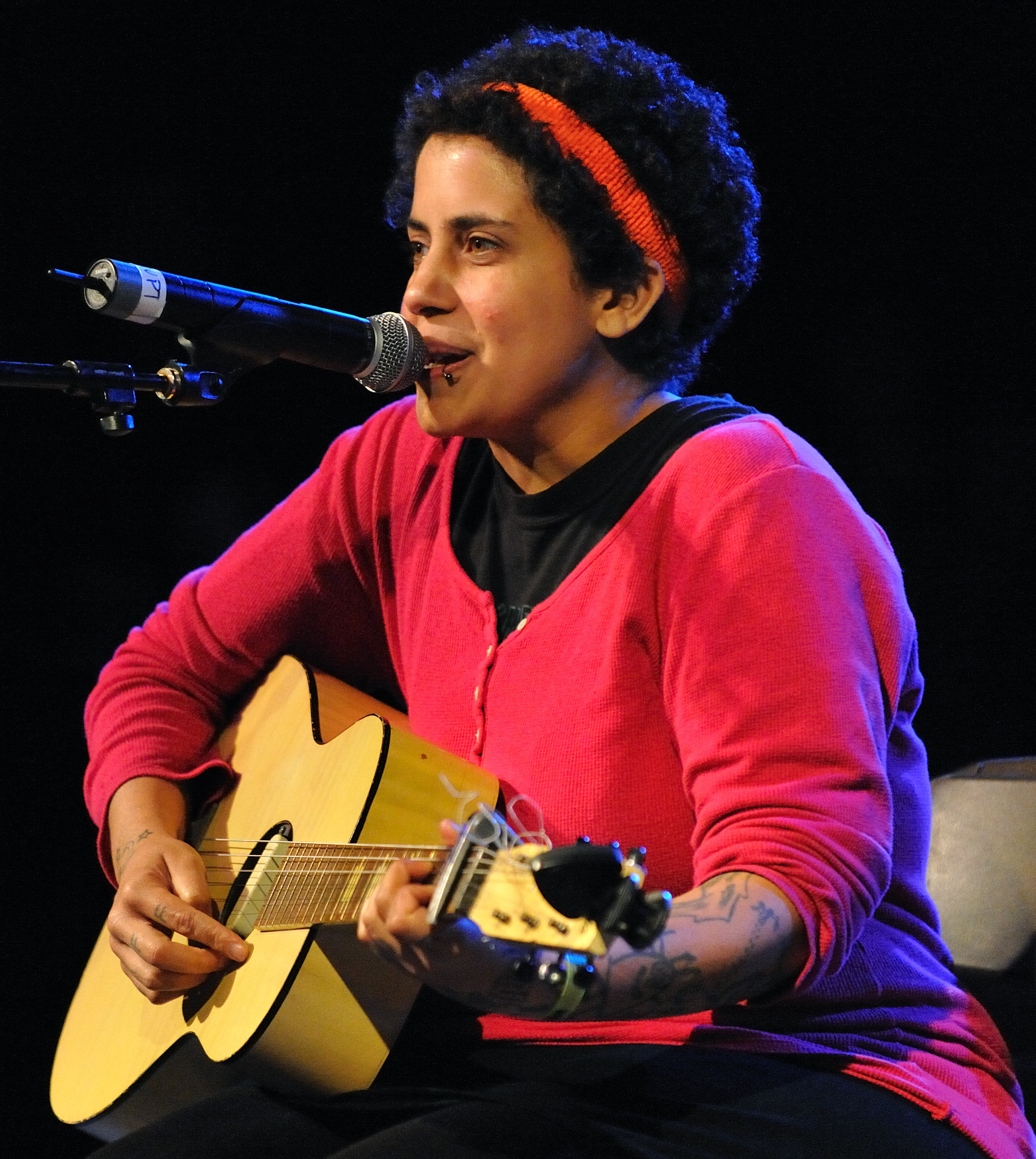
- Dawson at the 2010 Harvest of Hope Festival in St. Augustine, Florida

Background information
- Born: November 17, 1972 (age 53); Bedford Hills, New York, U.S.
- Genres: Anti-folk; folk punk; DIY music
- Instruments: Vocals; guitar
- Labels: Rough Trade; K
- Member of: Moldy Peaches
- Formerly of: The Uncluded

Kimya Dawson (born November 17, 1972) is an American folk singer-songwriter, one half of the anti-folk duo the Moldy Peaches. Dawson's work with the Moldy Peaches earned them a cult following and critical acclaim, with their 2001 song "Anyone Else but You" landing a spot in multiple acclaimed indie film soundtracks. "Anyone Else but You" as performed by Michael Cera and Elliot Page charted on the Billboard Hot 100 after its prominent inclusion in the 2007 film Juno, the soundtrack of which includes several songs by Dawson and her (Note: Dawson uses the pronouns she/they/grandpa. This article uses she/her for consistency.) associated musical acts. The song remains Dawson's highest charting single to date. In addition to her work with the Moldy Peaches, Dawson has released seven solo studio albums and collaborated with various other artists from a diverse range of genres, including Aesop Rock, They Might Be Giants, The Mountain Goats, and Third Eye Blind.

== Career ==
Dawson became well known as co-founder of the Moldy Peaches alongside Adam Green. Since the Moldy Peaches went on hiatus in 2004 Dawson has released a string of lo-fi homemade albums and toured widely in North America and Europe. Dawson's children's album, Alphabutt, was released on September 10, 2008. Song titles include "The Alphabutt Song", "Seven Hungry Tigers", "Little Monster Babies", "Wiggle My Tooth" and "Pee Pee in the Potty", and collaborators include former Third Eye Blind guitarist Kevin Cadogan and a number of Dawson's other musical friends and their children. She has also been invited to participate in the Sesame Street television program.

In September 2012, she appeared in a campaign called "30 Songs / 30 Days" to support Half the Sky: Turning Oppression into Opportunity for Women Worldwide, a multi-platform media project inspired by Nicholas Kristof and Sheryl WuDunn's book.

== Soundtrack work ==
Dawson's songs are featured in the films The Guatemalan Handshake and Glue, both of which were shown at the Olympia Film Festival in November 2007.

In 2008, Dawson contributed the song "Anthrax"—about 9/11—to the soundtrack of the Body of War documentary.

"Anyone Else But You", a song she recorded with the Moldy Peaches, was used in the documentary Murderball, about a team of wheelchair rugby players. This song was also used in the film Juno. The melody of this song, with new lyrics, was used in a commercial for Atlantis.com.

Critics warmly received the music in Juno, where Dawson's "sweetly melancholic acoustic-strummed tunes" helped define the character of a pregnant young teenager who decides to have her baby. Dawson helped choose many of the songs for the Juno film, helping to set the film's mood. The soundtrack was voted by NPR listeners as the 14th best of the year in a listener poll for 2008. Dawson sings about diverse topics:

And there on the soundtrack ... is Kimya Dawson, her primal, primitive odes to tire swings and vampires and roller coasters goosing us along, her wobbly voice and furtively chicken-scratched double-time guitar like a terrified little kid who just ditched the training wheels and is now somehow barreling down a mountain.

— Rob Harvilla, The Village Voice, 2008

Dawson's authentic persona has a demeanor which is "sheepish and guileless and awkward in a way that you really can't fake" and who sometimes looks "legitimately terrified" during performances, according to Village Voice music critic Rob Harvilla.

Five of Dawson's solo songs, two from Antsy Pants, as well as one from the Moldy Peaches, are included on the Juno soundtrack, released in December 2007. Composer Mateo Messina also based the film's score on Dawson's music.

The soundtrack album, after two weeks topping Billboard's Digital Albums chart, reached No. 8 on the Billboard 200, in its first week of release. In its first full week of physical release the album sold 68,000 copies, reaching No. 3 on the Soundscan album chart. It missed out on the No. 1 spot by only 2,600 copies. The following week it jumped to #2, while selling 15% fewer copies (58,000), just 2,000 copies behind first place. In the album's third week of physical release it finally made the No. 1 spot on the Billboard 200 and Soundscan charts, selling 65,000 copies. The soundtrack for Juno won a Grammy for Best Compilation Soundtrack in 2009, beating out American Gangster, August Rush, Mamma Mia!, and Sweeney Todd: The Demon Barber of Fleet Street.

Two songs were also included in the soundtrack to Unmade Beds.

== Other collaborations ==
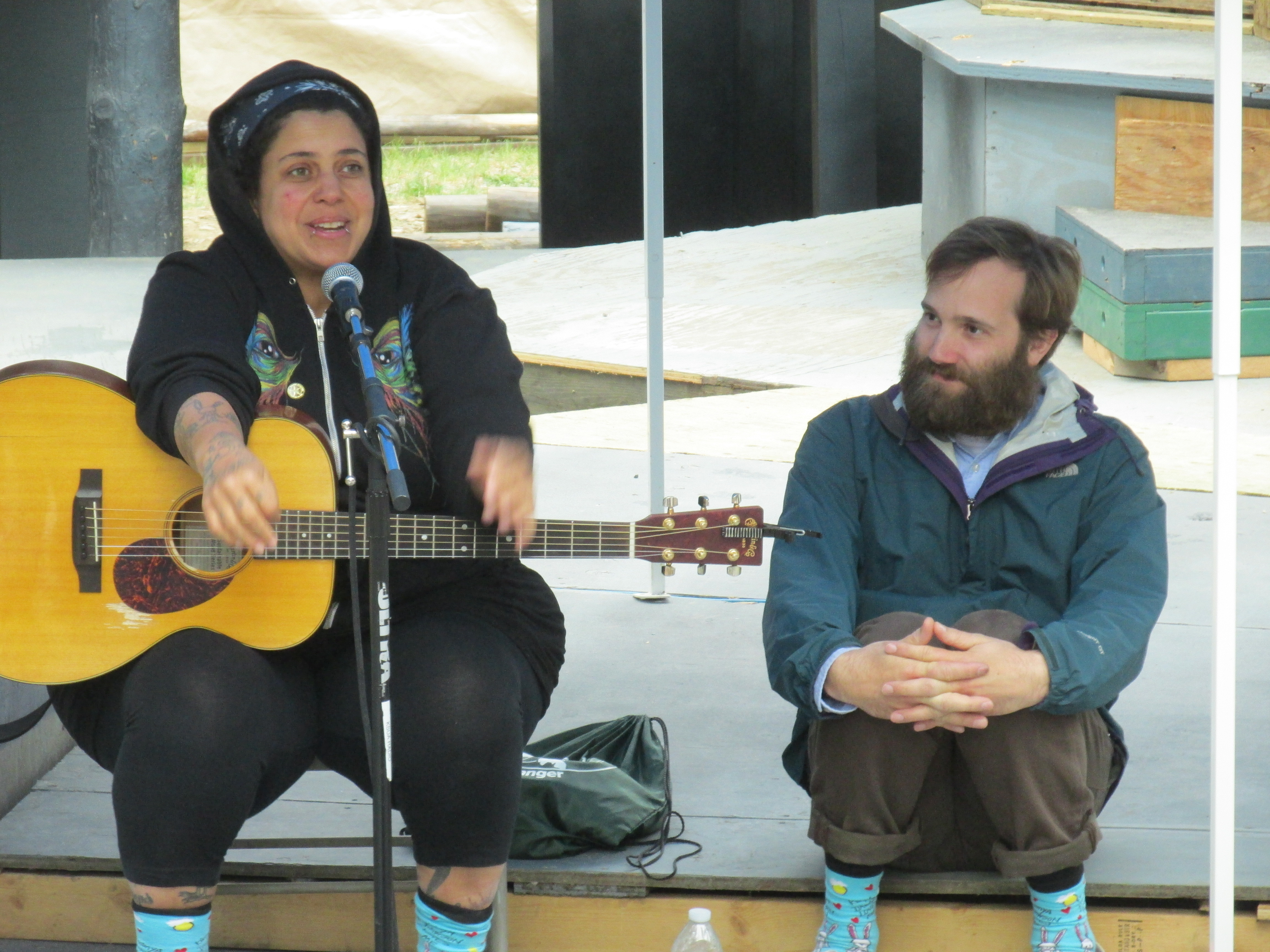
Kimya Dawson with Paul Baribeau in June 2014. The two are wearing matching socks with a design similar to many of Dawson's album covers, with the words "Kimya Dawson Loves Me" appearing amongst cartoon rabbits.

Dawson performs on recordings by Ben Kweller, They Might Be Giants, the Mountain Goats, John Wayne Shot Me, Your Heart Breaks, and the Terrordactyls.

The Third Eye Blind track "Self-Righteous" on their album Out of the Vein features a duet with Dawson and Third Eye Blind's lead singer Stephan Jenkins. Dawson also appears on the Third Eye Blind album, Ursa Major, on the track "Why Can't You Be". This song was available as a bonus track on the iTunes Store download.

Regina Spektor collaborated with Dawson on the song "Fire" on the Hidden Vagenda album. Dawson also collaborated with fellow antifolk Jeffrey Lewis. She made a band called 'The Bundles,' with Jack Lewis and drummer, Anders Griffen, though released the songs under the name "Kimya Dawson and Jeffrey Lewis", on a split with Jeffrey Lewis and Diane Cluck.

Under the name Geniusis, Dawson released the free album Holiday Rampage alongside Aesop Rock, Johnny Druelinger, Jason Carmer and Quinn Tuffinuff.

In February 2011, Dawson recorded a Daytrotter session with Aesop Rock, in which they performed three songs together. This session was later released in May 2011.

Dawson released the solo album Thunder Thighs in October 2011. The album features guest performances by Aesop Rock, John Darnielle of the Mountain Goats, Nikolai Fraiture of the Strokes, Forever Young Senior Citizen Rock & Roll Choir, Olympia Free Choir, Quinn Tuffinuff, Daniel Bryan, Dawson's child Panda and more.

She has performed numerous times with Paul Baribeau, whom she references several times in her songs.

Dawson played An Evening of Awesome at Carnegie Hall with John Green and Hank Green on January 15, 2013.

On February 11, 2013, Dawson and Aesop Rock released their first music video as The Uncluded on YouTube, a single titled "Earthquake". Their debut album Hokey Fright was released on May 7, 2013. The video for their third single "Delicate Cycle" has a cameo of Lil Bub.

== Personal life ==
On Christmas Day in Port Townsend, Washington in 1998, Dawson accidentally overdosed on whiskey and prescription pills. Dawson suffered a grand mal seizure and vomited blood, which she then inhaled. To the surprise of her doctors, Dawson woke up from a coma in a hospital the next day.

Dawson moved to Bedford Hills, New York, in December 2005. In 2006, Dawson married musician Angelo Spencer. On July 28, 2006, Dawson gave birth to daughter Panda Delilah and in November 2006, they all moved to Olympia, Washington.

Dawson is good friends with AEW wrestler Bryan Danielson (aka Daniel Bryan), who appears as a guest artist on the Thunder Thighs track "Captain Lou", written in homage to wrestling manager Lou Albano.

Prior to 2007, Dawson once joked that she is a cousin of The Strokes' drummer Fabrizio Moretti. From the joke started a myth that they are actually cousins.

In late 2019, Dawson disclosed on social media that she had been impacted by gender dysphoria and stated her pronouns as she/they/grandpa. She had previously referred to herself as "Grandpa Kimya" on Twitter as early as 2012. The following January, in a tweet addressing "bullies" on posts in the #IAmNonbinary hashtag, Dawson wrote that "things might have been very different" for her growing up if she "had known words like 'gender fluid' and 'nonbinary' and that language had been normalized by my peers and role models".

== Discography ==
Before the Moldy Peaches' Rough Trade releases there were several homemade CDRs.

=== With the Moldy Peaches ===
- The Moldy Peaches – Released September 11, 2001 by Rough Trade Records
- County Fair/Rainbows – A single released in 2002
- Moldy Peaches 2000: Unreleased Cutz and Live Jamz 1994-2002 – Released March 18, 2003 by Rough Trade Records and Jess Turpin

=== Solo albums ===
- I'm Sorry That Sometimes I'm Mean – released November 5, 2002 by Rough Trade Records
- Knock Knock Who? – released September 29, 2003 by Important Records
- My Cute Fiend Sweet Princess – released September 29, 2003 by Important Records
- Hidden Vagenda – released October 5, 2004 by K Records
- Remember That I Love You – released May 9, 2006 by K Records
- Alphabutt – released September 2008 by K Records
- Thunder Thighs – released October 18, 2011 by Great Crap Factory
- ”Follow That Dream” released in 2023

=== With Antsy Pants ===
- Antsy Pants – released 2006 by Plan It X Records

=== With The Bundles ===
- The Bundles – released 2009 by K Records

=== With The Uncluded ===
- Hokey Fright – released July 5, 2013 by Rhymesayers Entertainment

=== With Adam Kirkup ===
- Hell is in Pittsburgh Tonight - released April 4, 2026 by Mahogany Songs

=== Compilations ===
- Third Eye Blind's 2009 album: Ursa Major [Bonus Track Version] – "Why Can't You Be" (With Kimya Dawson) [Bonus Track]
- Third Eye Blind's 2003 album: Out of the Vein – "Self Righteous"
- Antifolk Vol. 1 – "I'm Fine"
- Anticomp Folkilation – "Will You Be Me" (Live)
- Afro-Punk Compilation Record Vol. 1 – "Loose Lips"
- AFNY Collaborations. Volume 1 – Kimya Dawson and Jeff Lewis
- Titanium Heart and Chains of Love – Kimya Dawson and Matt Rouse EP (collaboration) Unicorn Sounds
- A.K.A.- smooth jams e.p. with Adam Green and Akida Junglefoot Dawson
- The Art Star Sounds Compilation February 2005 – "Velvet Rabbit" (Live)
- No Parachute. Vol. 1. A compilation of indie music videos. (DVD) – "Lullaby For The Taken" (video directed by Ted Passon). 2005, Happy Happy Birthday To Me Records.
- Robot Boy DVD. Compilation of short films and videos by Ted Passon. – "Lullaby For The Taken". 2005, K Records/Secretly Canadian.
- I Killed the Monster: 21 Artists Performings the Songs of Daniel Johnston – "Follow That Dream" 2006, Second Shimmy
- Juno Soundtrack – Rhino Records 2008
- The Terrordactyls song "Devices" featuring guest vocals by Kimya Dawson
- Body of War: Songs that Inspired an Iraq War Veteran – "Anthrax". Sire Records March 18, 2008
- Tallahassee Turns Ten: a Mountain Goats Cover Album (2012)
