= The Uncluded =

American hip hop group

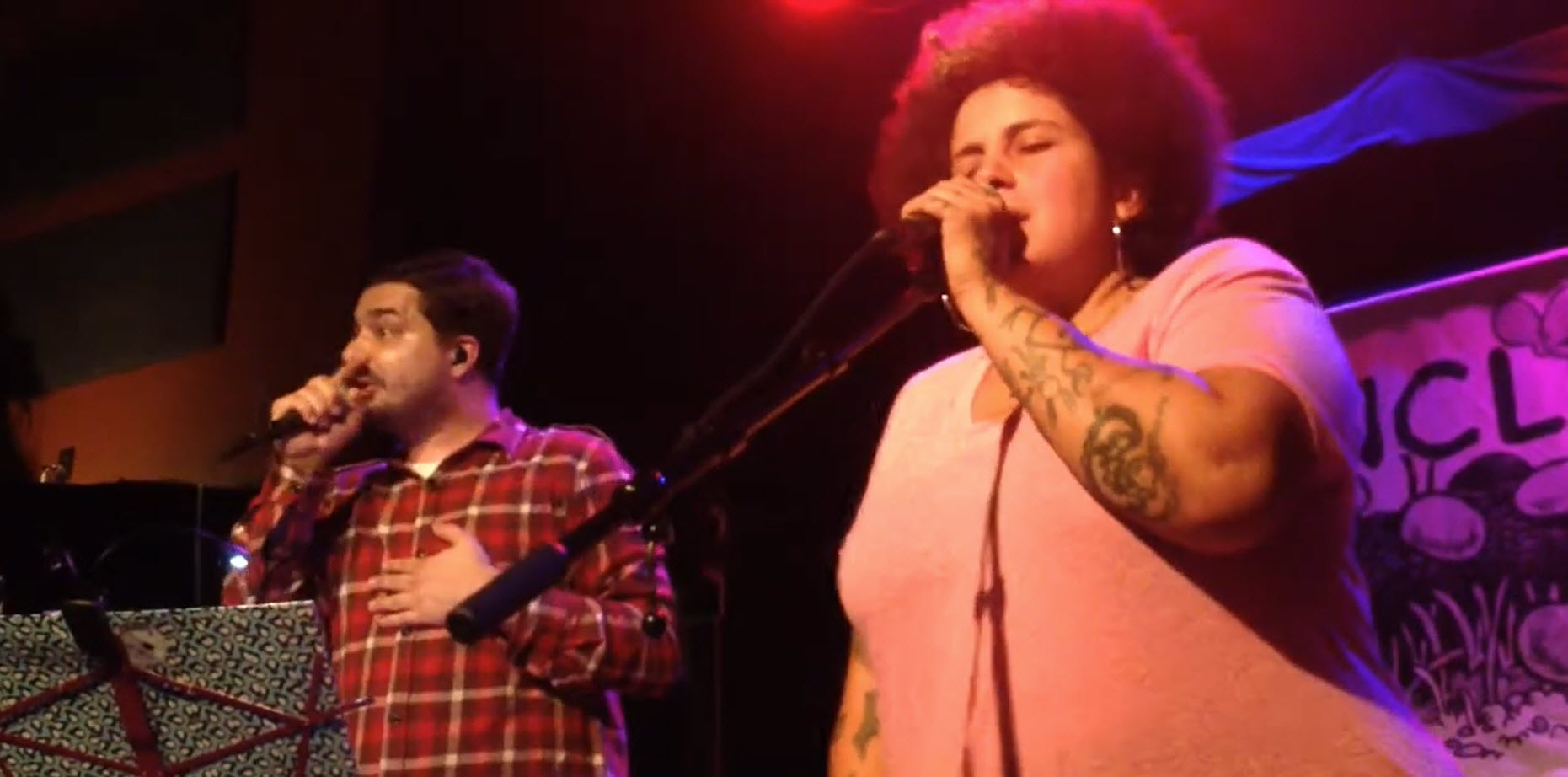
- The Uncluded performing in Madison, Wisconsin in 2013

Background information
- Genres: Anti-folk; folkhop; indie folk; rap
- Years active: 2009–2016
- Labels: Rhymesayers Entertainment
- Past members: Aesop Rock; Kimya Dawson

The Uncluded was an American indie folk rap group, formed by rapper Aesop Rock and singer-songwriter Kimya Dawson. In 2013, they released an album titled Hokey Fright, through Rhymesayers Entertainment. The band name is a reference to the Michael Bernard Loggins book Imaginationally.

On February 11, 2013, the Uncluded released their first music video on YouTube. The single is titled "Earthquake". Their debut album Hokey Fright was released on May 7, 2013. The video for their third single "Delicate Cycle" has a cameo of Lil Bub.

The band toured together in early 2014 and performed a piece as part of Bedstock in 2016. They have not released any material since Hokey Fright and, in May 2018, Dawson tweeted "Aesop Rock is not my friend."

== Discography ==
- Hokey Fright (2013)
