= I'm Sorry That Sometimes I'm Mean =

Studio album by Kimya Dawson
- Released: November 2002
- Recorded: 2002
- Genre: Anti-folk, indie rock
- Length: 47:23
- Label: Sanctuary Records, Rough Trade Records

Kimya Dawson chronology
I'm Sorry That Sometimes I'm Mean (2002)	My Cute Fiend Sweet Princess (2004)

Professional ratings
Review scores
Source	Rating
Allmusic	3/5 stars
The New Rolling Stone Album Guide	3.5/5 stars
Now	3/5
Rolling Stone	4/5 stars
The Village Voice	A

I'm Sorry That Sometimes I'm Mean is Kimya Dawson's debut solo album, released in 2002.

== Track listing ==
All tracks are written by Kimya Dawson.

No.	Title	Length
1.	"Trump Style"	4:20
2.	"Reminders of Then"	3:39
3.	"Everything's Alright"	2:31
4.	"Rocks with Holes"	7:18
5.	"Talking Ernest"	5:25
6.	"Wandering Daughter"	5:51
7.	"Eleventeen"	4:24
8.	"Hold My Hand"	5:56
9.	"Stinky Stuff"	1:57
10.	"Sleep"	1:25
11.	"So Far to Go"	4:19
