= The Bundles =

The Bundles were an anti-folk music group formed in 2001 by Jeffrey Lewis and The Moldy Peaches' Kimya Dawson. Their members included, in addition to Lewis and Dawson, Lewis' brother Jack, Brooklyn-based drummer Anders Griffen, and indie rock musician Karl Blau. They released one eponymous album, on March 9, 2010, on K Records.

== History ==
Lewis and Dawson formed the Bundles when they first met in 2001, and went on to meet back up sporadically over the next eight years, before recording the songs that appeared on their studio debut in February 2009. Prior to the recording, they were joined by Jack Lewis, Griffen, and Blau, who helped them perform their first songs live and, later on, contribute to songwriting. In May 2010, after their eponymous album was released, they went on a tour, first in their hometown of New York City and then to Europe.
