= Hidden Vagenda =

Studio album by Kimya Dawson
- Released: October 5, 2004
- Recorded: 2004
- Genres: Anti-folk; indie rock
- Length: 51:01
- Label: K
- Producers: Arion Salazar; Jason Carmer

Kimya Dawson chronology
My Cute Fiend Sweet Princess (2004)	''Hidden Vagenda'' (2004)	Remember That I Love You (2006)

Professional ratings
Aggregate scores
Source	Rating
Metacritic	73/100 link
Review scores
Source	Rating
AllMusic	3/5 stars
Entertainment Weekly	A−
Pitchfork	6.5/10
Rolling Stone	3/5 stars
Tom Hull – on the Web	A−
The Village Voice	A−

Hidden Vagenda is the fourth solo studio album by American singer-songwriter Kimya Dawson, and the first to be released by K Records. The album contains songs about their pain from the deaths of loved ones, the then-upcoming 2004 election, and a power ballad version of a song from a previous solo album featuring a recording of members of The Moldy Peaches as an intro. Hidden Vagenda also includes myriad guest performers, including Daniel Johnston, Paleface, Vanessa Carlton, and members of the French anti-folk group Herman Düne.

The tracks "It's Been Raining" and "Blue Like Nevermind" were recorded in France with members of Herman Düne backing Kimya, and others were recorded in the Dawson family kitchen and Olive Juice Music in New York City.

A video for the song "Lullaby for the Taken" was directed by Ted Passon in 2004.

== Track listing ==
1. "It's Been Raining"
2. "Fire" (featuring Regina Spektor – vocals)
3. "Viva la Persistence"
4. "Lullaby for the Taken"
5. "I Will Never Forget"
6. "Singing Machine"
7. "Moving On" (featuring Regina Spektor – piano and Vanessa Carlton – backing vocals)
8. "Blue Like Nevermind"
9. "My Heroes"
10. "Parade"
11. "5 Years"
12. "Anthrax" (powerballad version)
13. "You Love Me"
14. "Angels and Seagulls"
