= Jeffrey Lewis =

American songwriter and cartoonist

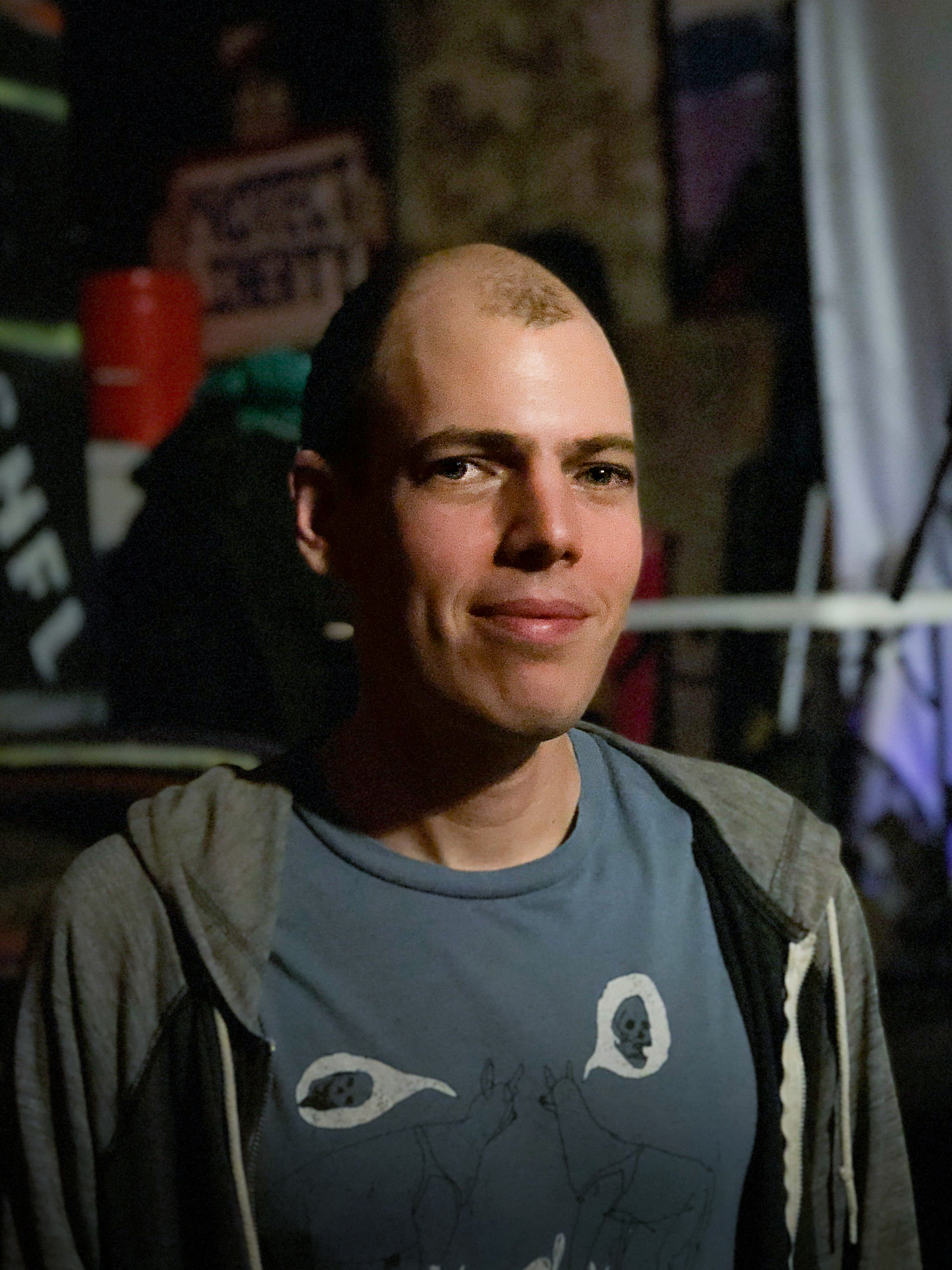
- Jeffrey Lewis performing at Super Happy Fun Land, Houston TX, January 2018

Background information
- Born: Jeffrey Lewis; November 20, 1975 (age 50); New York City, United States
- Genres: Anti-folk, folk punk, indie rock
- Years active: 1997–present
- Labels: Rough Trade, Don Giovanni Records
- Website: thejeffreylewissite.com

Jeffrey Lewis (born November 20, 1975) is an American singer-songwriter and comic book artist.

== Early life ==
Lewis was born in New York City and grew up on the Lower East Side. He attended State University of New York at Purchase, graduating in 1997 with a degree in literature. His Senior Literary Thesis was on the comic book Watchmen.

Lewis also lectured on the topic of Watchmen at the Institute For Cultural Studies at the University of Leuven, Belgium, in 2000, and the text of his lecture ("The Dual Nature of Apocalypse in Watchmen") was published in the book The Graphic Novel, edited by Jan Baetens, in 2001.

Starting in 2000, he spent about two years living in Austin, Texas, playing open mic nights, working odd jobs and distributing his autobiographical comics to local coffee shops.

== Music ==
Several of his musical influences have been acknowledged in his songs such as "Williamsburg Will Oldham Horror", and "The History of The Fall." Lewis' lyrics are complex and literate, often combining a nihilistic world-view with a hopeful message and sharp wit. Growing up on the Lower East Side of Manhattan, his songs are also highly informed by his home surroundings, with songs name-dropping places such as Williamsburg, the FDR Drive and the East River.

Lewis is often regarded as part of the antifolk movement, foremost because he was one of the many bands and performers (including The Moldy Peaches, Kimya Dawson, Diane Cluck, Regina Spektor, Major Matt Mason USA and Lach) who played in the 1990s at New York's SideWalk Cafe and its biannual antifolk festivals and open mic events. His music also possesses certain traits of a perceived antifolk style – a downbeat self-deprecating humor, an off-kilter singing style, a mixture of acoustic and 'punk' songs which feature themes of everyday occurrences and feelings. Lewis himself does not mind the 'antifolk' tag: "I think it's a cool title. The fact that no one knows what it means, including me, makes it kind of mysterious and more interesting than saying that you're a singer/songwriter or that you play indie rock."

After being signed by the British record label Rough Trade in 2001, Jeffrey Lewis released his first official album The Last Time I Did Acid I Went Insane. Also that year (in February), Lewis was visited by Kimya Dawson while living in Austin, Texas. Over the week she stayed there, they wrote five songs. These songs were later re-recorded with a full band and released by K Records under the moniker "The Bundles," on an album of the same name, in 2010.

In 2003, Rough Trade released the album It's the Ones Who've Cracked That the Light Shines Through, credited to Jeffrey Lewis with Jack Lewis and drummer Anders Griffen. His third Rough Trade record, City and Eastern Songs, was released in the UK in November 2005 and in the US in September 2006. Most of Lewis's albums also include his brother, Jack Lewis, who wrote or co-wrote and sang and played bass on a number of the songs. In October 2007, Rough Trade released 12 Crass Songs, a Jeffrey Lewis album consisting entirely of songs written by the British punk band Crass, reworked to match Lewis's antifolk style.

He has also performed and collaborated with Kimya Dawson of The Moldy Peaches as well as Diane Cluck. Some of his hand-drawn comics appear in the cover art of his CD releases.

In June 2008, Jeffrey was the support act for Stephen Malkmus and the Jicks in Europe. Other well-known acts that Lewis has performed shows or whole tours with include The Presidents of the United States of America, Devendra Banhart, Jarvis Cocker, Black Dice, Adam Green, Thurston Moore, R. Stevie Moore, The Fall, Kimya Dawson, Beth Orton, Frank Black, the Fiery Furnaces, Daniel Johnston, Scout Niblett, the Mountain Goats, Dr. Dog, The Moldy Peaches, Cornershop, Trachtenburg Family Slideshow Players, Wooden Wand, the Cribs, Danielson, Herman Dune, Los Campesinos, Roky Erickson, and Super Furry Animals.

The New York Times has published his writings and graphic works.

The New York Times online Op-Ed page "Measure For Measure" hired Jeffrey Lewis to write a number of short essays on the topic of songwriting, some of which he drew in comic book form. All went up on The New York Times website at intervals from 2008 to 2013.

Lewis has created a number of illustrated historical songs, usually sung while flipping through accompanying books of color drawings, including ten such pieces which are in use by The History Channel on their website.

In November 2011, The New York Times ran a feature article on Jeffrey Lewis in the Arts section of November 23, written by Ben Sisario.

Lewis published a comic strip in The Guardian newspaper in London. It was entitled "What Would Pussy Riot Do?" and it was printed on the occasion of a new release of a single with the same title.

In a January 2018, "MusicMakers" interview with Adafruit, Lewis announced he was working on numerous new projects, including "Writing a new issue of my comic book series, mastering an album I recorded of covers of Tuli Kupferberg songs, mixing an album I recorded in collaboration with Peter Stampfel, and working on writing and recording new songs with my band for my own next album. Remastering and repackaging my old 2005 album “City & Eastern Songs" for a deluxe vinyl re-issue."

== Artwork and writing ==
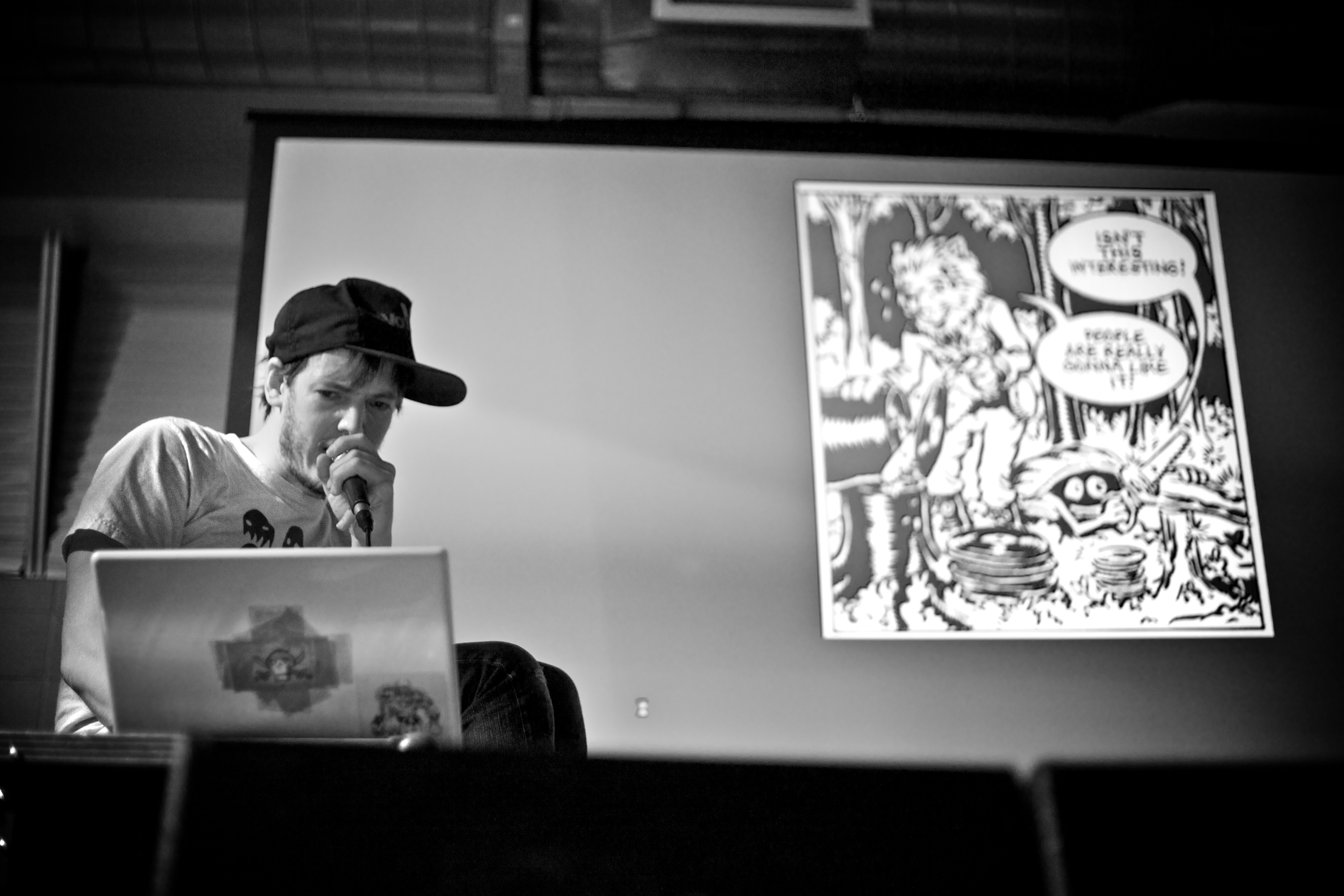
Lewis presenting at London's Rough Trade East in 2011

Jeffrey Lewis-designed issue of Bearded.

Jeffrey has his own comic book series titled Fuff (formerly called Guff). The series ended in 2020 with issue 12. In 2021, the Complete Fuff Comix Collection was released, a bundle of all 13 issues with an exclusive dust jacket and 3 page bonus comic.

In March 2009, he designed the cover to the sixth issue of Bearded magazine.

Comics

- Reflections on Tomorrow thus a yesterday Flower Shall Doom (1998)
- The Worldwide Comix Scavenger Hunt vol 1 (1998–2003)
- Reflections #2 (1998–2003)
- Trip to Key West (1999)
- 1999 European Travel Diary (1999)
- Jeff's Austin Diary (2001)
- Come to My Show (2004) (reissued as "Fuff # 0" in 2011)
- Guff # 1 (2004) (reissued as "Fuff # 1" in 2005)
- Guff # 2 (2005) (reissued as "Fuff # 2" in 2008)
- Guff # 3 (2005) (reissued as "Fuff # 3 in 2008)
- Fuff # 4 (2006)
- Fuff # 5 (2006)
- Fuff # 6 (2007)
- Fuff # 7 (2008)
- Fuff # 8 (2010)
- Fuff # 9 (2014)
- Fuff # 10 (2014)
- Fuff # 11 (2016)
- Fuff # 12 (2020)
- Complete Fuff Comix Collection (2021)
- The Art of Touring (2007) (A compilation book featuring a comic story that also appears in Fuff # 6)
- Comic book press kit for Mountain Goats' album Heretic Pride (2008)
- The chapter "Tuli Kupferberg" in The Beats: A Graphic History (2009) (co-author)
- Statics: Issue #1 (2022)
- Statics: Issue #2 (2023)

== Discography ==
=== Albums and EPs ===
- When Madman Was Good - Version One (1997)
- When Madman Was Good - Version Two (1998)
- Indie-Rock Fortune Cookie (1998)
- Journey to the Center of the Earth (1999)
- The Only Time I Feel Right Is When I'm Drawing Comic Books (2000)
- I Am, Of Course, Glad (2000)
- Kimya Dawson And Jeff Lewis (2001)
- Songs From Austin (2001)
- Diane Cluck And Jeffrey Lewis (2001)
- The Last Time I Did Acid I Went Insane (Rough Trade, 2001)
- Guitar Situations: Musical Conduct (2002)
- AntiFolk Collaborations Volume 1 (2002)
- It's the Ones Who've Cracked That the Light Shines Through (Rough Trade, 2003)
- Jeffrey Lewis "Four Seasons" Box Set (Hallso, 2004)
- City and Eastern Songs (Jeffrey & Jack Lewis) (Rough Trade, 2005)
- Gas Money EP (2005) (split with Schwervon!)
- Tapes From The Crypt (2006)
- 12 Crass Songs (Rough Trade, 2007)
- City and Eastern Tapes (2008)
- 'Em Are I (Jeffrey Lewis & the Junkyard) (Rough Trade, 2009)
- The Bundles (K Records, 2010)
- Come On Board (Peter Stampfel & Jeffrey Lewis) (2011)
- A Turn in the Dream-Songs (Rough Trade, 2011)
- Hey Hey it's... The Jeffrey Lewis & Peter Stampfel Band (2013) (with Peter Stampfel)
- Jeffrey Lewis & The Jrams (2014)
- Manhattan (Rough Trade, 2015)
- ...Did Not Choose the Tracks... (PIAPTK, 2016)
- A Loot-Beg Bootleg (Jeffrey Lewis & The Jrams) (2016)
- Works By Tuli Kupferberg (1923–2010) (Jeffrey Lewis & The Deposit Returners) (Don Giovanni Records, April 2018)
- 13 Fall Songs (Jeffrey Lewis & Los Bolts) (2018)
- Bad Wiring (Jeffrey Lewis & The Voltage) (2019)
- 2019 Tapes: Cowardly & Brave & Stupid & Smart & Happy-Ever-After & Doomed (Jeffrey Lewis) (2020)
- 2020 Tapes: Shelter-at-Homerecordings & Pandemos (Jeffrey Lewis) (2020)
- Both Ways (The Jeffrey Lewis & Peter Stampfel Band) (2021)
- 2021 Tapes: Suddenly it's Been Too Late for a Long Time (Jeffrey Lewis) (2021)
- 2022 Tapes! Slices of Water (and Song Junk) (Jeffrey Lewis) (2023)
- Asides & B-Sides (2014–2018) (2023)
- It Could Be Worse (2024)
- The Great Gatsby (2024)
- 2023 Tapes (2024)
- The Even More Freewheelin' Jeffrey Lewis (2025)

=== Singles ===
- "The Chelsea Hotel Oral Sex Song" (2001)
- "Back When I Was Four" (2002)
- "Graveyard/Spirit of Love" (2002)
- "No LSD Tonight/Don't Let The Record Label Take You Out To Lunch" (2003)
- "Williamsburg Will Oldham Horror" (2005)
- "Had It All" (2005)
- "To Be Objectified" (2009)
- "Roll Bus, Roll" (2010)
- "Cult Boyfriend" (2011)
- "WWPRD/Sunbeams/The Fall of the Soviet Union" (2013)
- "LPs" (2019) Spotify
- "In Certain Orders" (2019) Spotify
- "Except for the Fact That It Isn't" (2019) Spotify
- "Exactly What Nobody Wanted" (2019) Spotify
- "Keep it Chill! (in the East Vill)" (2020) Spotify YouTube
- "Now We've Beat That Stupid Virus We Can Get Back to Our Stupid Lives" (2021)
- "Bartholomew" (2023)
- "The History of the Development of Punk on the Lower East Side, 1950-1975" (2024)

=== Compilation appearances ===
- Antifolk Vol. 1 (2002) – "You Don't Have To Be A Scientist To Do Experiments on Your Own Heart"
- Call It What You Want This Is Antifolk (2002) – "So Long (I'm Gonna Go Draw All Alone In My Shack)"
- Stop Me If You Think You've Heard This One Before (2003) – "Part-Time Punks"
- The Art Star Sounds Compilation (2005) – "Williamsburg Will Oldham Horror
- R. Stevie Moore presents: "Aesthetic" (2005) – "Who Killed Davey Moore (Dylan)"
- Still Unravished- A Tribute to June Brides (2006) – "Waiting For A Change"
- Anticomp Folkilation (2007) – "The River" (with Diane Cluck)
- Tallahassee Turns Ten: a Mountain Goats Cover Album (2012)
- Audio Antihero Presents: "Some.Alternate.Universe" for FSID (2012) – "Dog Eat Dog"
- Weary Engine Blues: Crossroads (2013) – "Farewell Transmission"
- Audio Antihero Presents: "Regal vs Steamboat" for Rape Crisis (2013) – "Infinite Monkeys"
- Audio Antihero Presents: "Unpresidented Jams" for SPLC & NILC (2017) – "Dictator Seeks Reichstag Fire"
- Punk Against Trump Vol. 2 (2020) – "2nd Amendment Song"
- Coalition (2020) – "Oh My Little Life On Earth"
