= Anders Griffen =

American drummer

Anders Griffen is a drummer, composer, and trumpet player from Brooklyn, New York. Griffen works in a range of contexts including folk, jazz, pop, improvised music, and modern dance theater.

== Career ==
Griffen is known for his work with songwriters and jazz musicians, playing the drum set sensitively and quietly enough to accompany acoustic music. His first appearance on record was in 1997, a tribute to Charles Moffett entitled Vision Blue with tenor saxophonist, Frank Lowe. They also completed two European tours with bassist, Bernard Santacruz. Other notable artists that have sought Griffen's accompaniment include Regina Spektor, Paleface, Jeffrey Lewis and Kimya Dawson, and their "super-group", The Bundles, and bands like Dufus and Death to Anders.

In recent years Griffen has formed a partnership with singer-songwriter Diane Cluck. They perform as a duo and have toured the Pacific Northwest and the United Kingdom. He also performs monthly with various other musicians and choreographers in and around New York.

== Reviews ==
- "Anders Griffen is a very different drummer than Moffett, far quieter and unobtrusive." Derek Taylor, 2001
- "drummer Anders Griffen ... brings backing rhythm to the solo pieces with ghostly finesse ... Griffen's technique is so understated and tailored to [the] music that sometimes it feels like he isn't playing at all." Sam Wolby, 2010
