= Rav Shmuel =

American musician and rabbi

- Born: Shmuel Skaist; Brooklyn, New York
- Genres: Jewish rock, alternative rock, anti-folk
- Instruments: Guitar, vocals
- Years active: 2001–present
- Labels: Jewish Music Group, My Friend Steve
- Website: ravshmuel.com

Shmuel Skaist (born December 8, 1964), known professionally as Rav Shmuel, is an American Orthodox rabbi, speaker, and musician from Brooklyn, New York. Initially gaining recognition for his Jewish outreach programs aimed at Phish concertgoers, Skaist taught in yeshivot in New York and Israel for several years before deciding to pursue a music career. His debut studio album, Protocols, was released in 2006 by the Jewish Music Group label.

== History ==
=== Early life ===
Shmuel Skaist was born to a devoutly Orthodox family in Brooklyn, New York's Crown Heights neighborhood. He is descended from a long line of prominent rabbis.

Although forbidden from listening to secular music, Skaist heard his first secular song, "Dream Weaver" by Gary Wright, at age 12, and subsequently began listening to bands like The Beatles, Pink Floyd, Jethro Tull, and Led Zeppelin. As a teenager growing up in Queens and Baltimore, he hung out at arcades and pool halls. He studied at the Sh'or Yoshuv Yeshiva, where he became close with the rosh yeshiva, Rabbi Shlomo Freifeld. After his ordination, he became a rebbe at a yeshiva high school in New York, where he would often get his student's attention by playing his guitar in class. He also oversaw youth outreach programs for the Orthodox Union , taught at Stern College for Women, and recorded a Jewish-themed grunge album.

=== Shabbat Tent and Gefiltefish ===
Skaist later relocated to Israel, where he taught philosophy at Bar-Ilan University and gave weekly performances at Mike's Place in Jerusalem. During this time, one of his students introduced him to the band Phish and, after initially being unimpressed, he ultimately became a fan. He later met fellow Phish fan and concert promoter Adam Weinberg and, in 1998, the two founded Gefiltefish, an outreach organization traveling to stops on Phish tours to provide community and spiritual advice to disaffiliated Jews in attendance. The following year, Skaist and Weinberg created the similarly minded Shabbat Tents, which hosted Shabbat prayers and meals for people at the tour stops. This project received a boost in publicity after Jewish reggae singer Matisyahu requested a Shabbat Tent at a festival he was headlining. Gefiltefish and Shabbat Tents have been present at several Phish festivals including Camp Oswego, Coventry, and Festival 8, as well as venues like the Empire Polo Club and Radio City Music Hall.

=== Music career ===
Moving back to New York, Skaist became the head of Yeshiva @ IDT, a yeshiva program run by the IDT Corporation in Newark, New Jersey.

In 2005, Skaist released an album called Some People Think That I Am Damned through My Friend Steve Records.

Looking to pursue his music career, Skaist found an open mic night at East Village's SideWalk Cafe via Google search. Receiving a positive response despite his blatantly rabbinic appearance, he began performing there regularly and developed a following. He caught the attention of the non-profit Jewish Music Group label, who released his debut album Protocols on September 30, 2006. A month later, Skaist released another album, also through Jewish Music Group, called B'yameinu, which featured more traditional Hasidic songs.

In 2010, he was featured in the music video for The Groggers' song "Eishes Chayil".

Skaist performed at the 2014 New York Antifolk Festival alongside artists like Hamell on Trial and Anne Husick of Band of Susans. In 2016 he debuted a new original song to his YouTube channel entitled "I Want To Know", about his feelings on turning 50.

== Personal life ==
Skaist lives in New York with his wife and six children. His son, Simchi Skaist, is a member of the Jewish rock band Shlepping Nachas.

== Discography ==
=== Albums ===
- Some People Think That I Am Damned (2005; My Friend Steve)
- Protocols (September 30, 2006; Jewish Music Group)
- B'yameinu (as Shmuel Skaist) (October 31, 2006; Jewish Music Group)

=== Music videos ===
- "Protocols" (2006)
- "Somebody Else" (2012)
