= New York Antifolk Festival =

Annual music festival

- Genre: Music
- Frequency: Semi-annually
- Locations: The Fort (1985-1992), SideWalk Cafe (1993-2018)
- Years active: 27
- Inaugurated: 1985
- Most recent: August 7–17, 2018 (New York, NY)

The New York Antifolk Festival is an annual music festival featuring anti-folk, indie rock, post-punk and indie pop bands and singer-songwriters. It also has featured performance artists, comedians and magicians.

Conceived in 1985 by Lach, the festival was created in response to the New York Folk Festival, allegedly after a number of musicians were rejected from folk music venues in the Village, though that allegation has been disputed. The festival initially took place at the Fort, before settling down in its current location at the SideWalk Cafe in 1993. Lach served as the host of the festival until 2007, when the role of impresario was taken over by Ben Krieger. The festival has been credited as a factor in keeping the anti-folk movement "vital, evolving and inclusive of what is now a generation of artists."

The festival hosts up to 50 acts over a seven-day period. It was traditionally kicked off by the SideWalk Cafe open-mic, which until its closure in 2019 was one of the longest-running traditional open-mics in New York City. The open-mic and the SideWalk Cafe have been praised by the likes of Suzanne Vega, and a number of notable musicians are known to have gotten their start at the SideWalk Cafe, including Regina Spektor, Nellie McKay and The Moldy Peaches.

The New York Antifolk Festival has featured a diverse group of performers over its 27-year run. Notable acts include The Washington Squares, Suzanne Vega, Schwervon!, Major Matt Mason USA, Lach, Dufus, The TriBattery Pops Tom Goodkind Conductor, Dots Will Echo, Chris Barron of the Spin Doctors, Jaymay, Darwin Deez, Larkin Grimm, Ching Chong Song, Jason Trachtenburg, Peter Dizozza, and the Elastic No-No Band.

== International expansion ==
The anti-folk movement and the New York Antifolk Festival have spawned a number of other festivals around the world. Filthy Pedro started the Antifolk UK Fest after a visit to the SideWalk Cafe. Other festivals include the Anti-anti-folk festival in Brixton, and the Kentucky Anti-folk festival, as well as several festivals in Berlin such as the Down by the River Festival.
