= Kirk Kelly =

American singer-songwriter

- Born: Kirk P. Kelly circa 1960; Long Island, New York US
- Origin: New York City
- Genres: anti-folk, folk, singer-songwriter
- Occupation(s): musician & union organizer
- Instrument(s): vocals, guitar, harmonica, ukulele
- Years active: 1980s – present
- Labels: SST, Mugsy Records

Kirk P. Kelly (born circa 1960) is a folk singer, songwriter and labor activist from New York City. In the mid-1980s Kelly and a group of like-minded musicians started calling themselves "anti-folk" and started a small but intense movement. Kelly's music has been infrequently recorded over the years. His work has often included topical songs. Some of Kelly's early songs dealt with the labor movement and were based upon his own work experience. A decade or so after starting his musical career Kelly was accepted to and attended an AFL-CIO organizer's training school and began working throughout the United States as a union organizer.

== Biography ==
Kelly was born on Long Island circa 1960 and grew up listening to (among other things) Irish musicians such as the Clancy Brothers. In the early 1980s he began performing music that was influenced by both the folk revival artists and punk bands such as the Ramones and the Clash. In the mid-80s Kelly found that the old guard of the Greenwich Village folk scene were unwilling accept this combination as legitimate folk music. One night Kelly was banned from the open mics at Gerde's Folk City for handing out flyers for a performance at an East Village venue.

As a result, Kelly banded together with like-minded musicians, Lach, Cindy Lee Berryhill, and Roger Manning to form the roots of what became known as the "anti-folk movement." Kelly's first recording was in a duo with Lach (regarded by many as the father of anti-folk) as "The Folk Brothers" in 1985 on their cassette-only release called, All Folked up with Nowhere to Go.

Kelly's first solo release, Go Man Go, appeared in 1988 on the punk label, SST (Black Flag, etc.). Allmusic calls the title song "hard driving and great, typical of Kelly." In the same year that "Just Do It!" first appeared in commercials for Nike, Inc., "Go Man Go" seemed to be something of a slogan among anti-folk scenesters. The phrase is quoted in a couple of songs on Roger Manning's debut release in that same year. Nearly the entire album features Kelly performing solo with guitar and harmonica (producer Brian Ritchie plays acoustic bass guitar on one song). Kelly's sound clearly shows the influence of early Bob Dylan and Phil Ochs. The later is paid a tribute on "Heroes of Tomorrow" (both a call to action and a look at figures of the past including Joe Hill, Eugene Debs, and Ochs). One reviewer of Kelly's first album called the work "so derivative of Bob Dylan that maybe A.J. Weberman should consider rooting through Kelly's trash.

A number of Kelly's earliest songs dealt with labor issues (e.g. "Corporation Plow"). Kelly's own experience working as a fruit picker on Long Island's East End planted the seed for his song, "Working in the Vineyards". Over time Kelly began performing at union rallies and would get called to play at picket lines. Later, while working in an airline's reservation office Kelly worked as a "white collar member" of the machinist's union. After several years on the job Kelly applied to an organizer's training school with the AFL-CIO. Soon he was helping to organize campaigns all around the United States, such as a Teamsters local on the waterfront in Seattle, Washington.

Kelly's socio-political second album, New City (1997) was released nearly a decade after his first. Kelly put it out on his own, Mugsy Records, a label that grew to include a handful of artists in the early 2000s. The "Mugsy Records Manifesto" laid out the labels mission to "fight for social and economic justice" saying:

"America belongs to those who build it, fix it, run it, clean it, protect it, feed it, care for it and educate it. In the work we do we forge a common identity and it is the work of its most progressive artists to give voice to that identity. America's popular culture must tell the real story of its people and reflect its true identity."

In 2003 Kelly's cover of "Downbound Train" was chosen for the Springsteen tribute album, Light of Day. Allmusic called his arrangement "radical" as Kelly stripped the song down to simply vocals and ukulele.

Although a 2004 interview quotes Kelly discussing songs to appear on his "next album" (including a song about patriot Nathan Hale) as of 2008 no recording appears to have materialized. Kelly continues, however, to make appearances where he both sings and speaks out for workers rights.

== Discography ==
=== Solo albums ===
- Go Man Go (1988, SST)
- New City (1997, Mugsy Records)

=== See also ===
- All Folked up with Nowhere to Go (1985) – cassette only release by Kirk Kelly and Lach as "The Folk Brothers"
- The Political Song (May 1983, CooP/Fast Folk Musical Magazine) – compilation included "Nineteen Miles from Shoreham Town"
- Quixotic (1984, Fast Folk Musical Magazine) – compilation included "I Pity the Poor British Soldier"
- Cross Country (1988, Fast Folk Musical Magazine) – compilation included "Dead Aid"
- Broome Closet Anti Folk Sessions (1989) – compilation that featured Kelly, Roger Manning, Billy Syndrome, Paleface, Susie Unger, John S. Hall, Cindy Lee Berryhill and others.
- Legacy: A Collection of New Folk Music (1989 Windham Hill) – compilation that includes "Go Man Go"
- Detours (1991, Fast Folk Musical Magazine) – includes "Stephen Foster"
- SST Acoustic (1991, SST) – includes "Go Man Go"
- Light of Day: A Tribute to Bruce Springsteen (2003, Schoolhouse Records) features Kelly performing "Downbound Train"
- A Century of Labor Songs (2004) – 100-year anniversary compilation by the International Brotherhood of Teamsters
