= Entwhistle Books =

- Founded: c. 1968
- Founder: Paul Williams, Chester Anderson, David G. Hartwell, Joel Hack
- Defunct: 2000
- Country of origin: United States
- Headquarters location: New York (1972); Glen Ellen, California (1976–1994); Encinitas, California (1995–2000)
- Key people: Paul Williams
- Publication types: Books
- Nonfiction topics: Rock music, memoir, human rights, New Age spirituality
- Fiction genres: Novels, poetry

Entwhistle Books was a small book publisher active from about 1968 to 2000. It was founded by Paul Williams, Chester Anderson, David G. Hartwell, and Joel Hack. Williams operated the publisher for most of its existence.

Entwhistle published poetry and nonfiction books by Williams, and novels by the likes of Philip K. Dick, Anderson, Tom Carson, and others.

Although formed around 1968, the first book Entwhistle published was Williams's Time Between, "a hippie journal in the communes and on the road, December 1969–February 1970," published in 1972. At that point, Entwhistle was based in New York City. The company was based in Glen Ellen, California (north of San Francisco) from 1976 to 1994, and then moved to Encinitas, California (north of San Diego).

== Titles (selected) ==
- Anderson, Chester (as John Valentine), Puppies (1979)
- Anderson, Chester, with illustrations by Charles Marchant Stevenson. Fox & Hare: The Story of a Friday Evening (1980) ISBN 9780960142897 — "Introduction: the Making of Fox & Hare" by Paul Williams
- Berryhill, Cindy Lee (Aug 1999). Memoirs of a Female Messiah: The Story of Me, Michelle Domingue.
- Carson, Tom. Twisted Kicks (1981) ISBN 9780934558037
- Cole, Robert and Paul Williams. The Book of Houses: An Astrological Guide to the Harvest Cycle in Human Life (1980)
- Dick, Philip K. Confessions of a Crap Artist (1975) ISBN 0-9601428-2-7 — originally written in 1959
- Sturgeon, Theodore. Argyll; A Memoir (1993) ISBN 978-0934558167
- Williams, Paul and Family. Time Between (1972; republished in 2000)
- Williams, Paul. Coming (1977)
- Williams, Paul. Dylan — What Happened? (1980) ISBN 978-0897080217
- Williams, Paul, ed., United Nations General Assembly. The International Bill of Human Rights (1981) ISBN 0-934558-06-X — foreword by Jimmy Carter
- Williams, Paul. Waking Up Together (1984)
- Williams, Paul. Heart of Gold (1991) — originally written in 1978
- Williams, Paul. Rock and Roll: The 100 Best Singles (1993) ISBN 978-0-934558-41-9
- Williams, Paul. Outlaw Blues: A Book of Rock Music, 2nd edition (2000) ISBN 978-0-934558-35-8 — originally published (by E. P. Dutton) in 1969
