= Mythological Horses =

Garage rock band from Alaska, United States

- Shawn Holley 2026

Background information
- Origin: Anchorage, Alaska
- Genres: alternative rock, Indie rock, punk rock
- Years active: 2003—present
- Labels: Hovercraft Records, Godless America Records
- Members: Shawn Holley
- Website: Bandcamp

Mythological Horses is an alternative rock band from Maui, Hawaii. The band consists of Shawn Holley. The band was founded in Anchorage, Alaska in 2003.

Mythological Horses have released three full-length studio albums, with the first two released by Hovercraft Records and the third by Godless America Records. Additionally, they have produced several EPs and singles through various other record labels. Since 2005, the band has maintained an extensive touring schedule across the United States, including headlining performances at numerous festivals, most notably the New York Antifolk Festival in 2010.

== History ==
Mythological Horses first came about in the mid 1990s when founder Shawn Holley and his childhood friend Chris Vanbibber began writing and performing songs. Both age 16, they started playing the punk/coffee house scene in Anchorage, Alaska under the name Churpbleepuh. Drawing heavily on such influences as Nirvana, The Cars, Sonic Youth, and The Dead Milkmen, Churpbleepuh played shows until 2000. At this time Holley left Alaska and began pursuing a solo career as an anti-folk artist, touring the United States excessively, performing over 200 shows per year. As his writing style began to lean back toward his punk and rock roots, Holley reformed the band and started performing officially as Mythological Horses in 2005.

Over the next decade, Mythological Horses continued consistent touring, sharing the stage with such bands as The Pharmacy, Blowfly, Joe Genaro of The Dead Milkmen, Mickey Avalon, Eagles Of Death Metal, Mike Watt, MC Lars, Kimya Dawson, T.S.O.L., and Smoke And Smoke featuring Spencer Moody of The Murder City Devils and members of godheadSilo. During this time, Mythological Horses released four albums (Idaho -2008/ Fairview Luvin-2008/ Fuck It-2009/ Super Joe Long Cocaine Mountain-2010) on Shawn Holley's label Lime Street Records. The bands posters (created by artist Pat Moriarity) were featured in two episodes in season 6 of the Showtime hit show Weeds.

In May 2013, Mythological Horses entered Witch Ape Studios and recorded their first full-length studio album under the production of Tad Doyle of Subpop band TAD, Andrew Crowley of Organica Recording, and Jack Endino who has worked closely with Nirvana and other Subpop artists. This album was released on vinyl record and digital download in 2014 on Hovercraft Records out of Portland, Or. The band received high praise in international press, and was featured on a KEXP Music That Matters podcast, Young Reckless Hearts, in April 2014.

In December 2017 Mythological Horses returned to Witch Ape studios in Seattle, WA. to record their second full-length studio album. It was engineered and produced by Tad Doyle (TAD) with Kurt Danielson (TAD) on bass, Kurt Block on lead guitar. The album was recorded in 7 days.

In 2022, Mythological Horses returned to the studio, collaborating with acclaimed producer Tad Doyle. With drummer Jest Commons on leave, Shawn Holley enlisted Jordan Duttinger (Godless America Records) to step in on drums. The recording featured an impressive lineup of contributors, including Kevin Whitworth (Love Battery) on acoustic guitar, Peggy Doyle (Pegadeath) on bass, Kurt Bloch (The Fastbacks) on electric guitar, Tad Doyle (TAD) on guitar, and Lori Goldston (Earth/Nirvana) on cello.

Renowned Seattle photographer Charles Peterson was also present in the studio, documenting the recording process with his iconic imagery.

== Discography ==
=== Albums ===
- Fairview Luvin (October 2008) Lime Street Records
- Idaho (December 2008) Lime Street Records
- Fuck It (May 2009) Lime Street Records
- Super Joe Long Cocaine Mountain (March 2010) Lime Street Records
- Mythological Horses (January 2014) Hovercraft Records
- YYYMF! (April 2019) Hovercraft Records
- SKY KING (February 2024) Godless America Records

=== Singles and compilations ===
- A Tribute To Bad Lyrics (Summer 2010) Ear Illusion Records
- More Songs For Friends (January 2014) Hovercraft Records
- "Don’t Think" b/w "Don’t Care" cassette single (2014) Godless America Records

=== Videos ===
- "Cold Heart" (2014) directed by Brett Roberts
- "All Alone" (2015) directed by Shawn Holley
- "Hot Dog" (2015) directed by Eli Luchak
