= Protocols (album) =

Studio album by Rav Shmuel
- Released: September 8, 2006
- Recorded: Doghaus Studios in Baltimore, Maryland
- Genre: Jewish rock, alternative rock, anti-folk
- Length: 48:21
- Label: Jewish Music Group
- Producer: Andres Karu, Michael Ferrentino

Rav Shmuel chronology
Some People Think That I Am Damned (2005)	Protocols (2006)	TBA

Singles from Protocols
- 1. "Protocols" Released: November 2, 2006; 2. "Somebody Else" Released: September 28, 2012

Protocols is the debut studio album by American Hasidic anti-folk singer Rav Shmuel. It was produced by Michael Ferrentino and ex-Wonder Stuff drummer Andres Karu and released on September 8, 2006 by Jewish Music Group. The album title is a reference to the infamous antisemitic hoax The Protocols of the Elders of Zion, which Rav Shmuel sarcastically confesses to in the album's title track.

== Singles ==
The album's lead single, "Protocols" was released in music video form on November 2, 2006. The lyrics respond to antisemitism by jokingly confessing that The Protocols of the Elders of Zion, an infamous hoax text purporting to be Jewish plans for world domination, is completely accurate. The song's animated music video, created by Erik Horvitz, depicts Rav Shmuel interacting with celebrities like Mel Gibson, Jerry Seinfeld, Steven Spielberg, and Madonna, as well as historical figures including Theodor Herzl and Karl Marx, and references several Jewish stereotypes.

A music video for "Somebody Else", directed by Francesco Thomas, was released on September 28, 2012. The video depicts Rav Shmuel as a captain aboard the RMS Queen Mary and shows several people, including performers on Hollywood Boulevard and star names on the Hollywood Walk of Fame, obscured by handheld question-mark signs.

== Reception ==
AllMusic's Stewart Mason gave the album 3.5 out of 5 stars, calling it "an immediately likable bit of good-humored anti-folk that doesn't require the visuals -- or even the knowledge that, yes, Rav Shmuel really is a Hasidic rabbi -- to get across." Ben Jacobson of The Jerusalem Post described it as "contemporary, fun and accessible but made heavier by a nuanced, early Dylan-like smirking sense of doom."

== Track listing ==
All tracks are written by Rav Shmuel.

No.	Title	Length
1.	"Dumb World"	3:04
2.	"Somebody Else"	4:14
3.	"Big Talkers"	4:30
4.	"I Feel Love"	4:47
5.	"Protocols"	3:38
6.	"Realistic X"	4:44
7.	"Last Chance"	3:13
8.	"Confused"	3:41
9.	"Social Suicide"	3:59
10.	"Itinerant Plea"	4:31
11.	"I Am Oxygen"	4:01
12.	"Fatherland"	3:59
Total length:		48:21

== Personnel ==
- Rav Shmuel – primary artist, photography
- Andres Karu – record producer, engineer, mixing, performer
- Michael Ferrentino – producer
- Summer Ray Brown – project assistant
- Richard Foos – project assistant
- Leonard Korobkin – project assistant
- David McLees – project assistant
- Yehuda Remer – project assistant
- Dean Schachtel – project assistant
- Candy Shipley – project assistant
- Stuart Wax – project assistant
