= Naked Movie Star =

Studio album by Cindy Lee Berryhill
- Released: 1989
- Genre: Anti-folk
- Label: Rhino
- Producer: Lenny Kaye

Cindy Lee Berryhill chronology
Who’s Gonna Save the World (1987)	Naked Movie Star (1989)	Garage Orchestra (1994)

Naked Movie Star is the second album by the American musician Cindy Lee Berryhill, released in 1989. Like her debut, it was released by Rhino Records. Berryhill supported the album with a North American tour that included shows with Sarah McLachlan, and later, Kevn Kinney and Peter Buck.

== Production ==
Recorded in New York City, the album was produced by Lenny Kaye, who also played guitar on the album, credited as "Jones Beach". Kaye helped Berryhill move beyond the acoustic trio sound of her first album by using jazz musicians; Berryhill was interested in working with him more for his work with Patti Smith rather than his subsequent production credits. Berryhill played guitar and harmonica on Naked Movie Star.

"Yipee" is a 13-minute beat poetry-inspired track. "Trump" is about Donald Trump's 1980s real estate tactics. "12 Dollar Motel" describes the existence of a prostitute. The narrator of "Baby (Should I Have the Baby?)" contemplates an abortion. "Old Trombone Routine" is about a faded musical act.

== Critical reception ==
Professional ratings
Review scores
Source	Rating
AllMusic	2.5/5 stars
Chicago Tribune	3.5/4 stars
MusicHound Rock: The Essential Album Guide	3/5 stars

The Washington Post wrote that Berryhill is "the most audible alumna of New York's anti-folk movement, but there's also plenty of post-punk edge and neo-Beat humor on her new Rhino album." Trouser Press noted that "the first album's spirited quirkiness eventually re-emerges, complete with a new set of purposeful musical reference points." The Chicago Tribune determined that "the musical diversity adds another dimension to Berryhill's terrific stories, which she tells in an arrestingly matter-of-fact voice." The San Diego Union-Tribune concluded that, compared to the debut, Naked Movie Star "had a colder, more formal tone, the sound of a California kid who had strayed a long way from home." LA Weekly called it "an impressive album by a distinctive artist."

AllMusic wrote: "Just barely flirting with self-pity but never quite stepping over that line, thanks largely to a deflatingly self-mocking bridge that smartly punctures the overriding sense of 'woe is me,' 'What's Wrong with Me' also features the loveliest melody of Berryhill's career and a simple piano-based arrangement that makes it sound not unlike a Beach Boys ballad from the early '70s."

== Track listing ==
No.	Title	Length
1.	"Me, Steve, Kirk and Keith"
2.	"Old Trombone Routine"
3.	"Supernatural Fact"
4.	"Indirectly Yours"
5.	"Trump"
6.	"12 Dollar Motel"
7.	"Turn Off the Century"
8.	"What's Wrong with Me"
9.	"Yipee"
10.	"Baby (Should I Have the Baby?)"
