= Impossible Ragtime Theater =

The Impossible Ragtime Theater, the IRT, was an American theater company founded in 1974 by Ted Story, George Ferencz, Cynthia Crane and Pam Mitchell. It ran 100 productions over 10 years in four different theatre spaces.

In its second season, it ran two spaces at once.

IRT also had a Director-Playwright Collaboration program, which included authors such as Kevin O'Morrison.

Jonathan Frakes and Armin Shimerman were members of the company at the same time. Brian Dennehy and Ray Wise were also members.
