= Paul Williams (Crawdaddy) =

American magazine founder and editor

- Williams, 1971
- Born: Paul S. Williams; May 19, 1948 Boston, Massachusetts, U.S.
- Died: March 27, 2013 (aged 64) California, U.S.
- Occupation: Music journalist; author; publisher
- Subject: Rock music
- Notable works: Crawdaddy; Entwhistle Books; Only Apparently Real: The World of Philip K. Dick; Bob Dylan: Performing Artist
- Spouse: Sachiko Kanenobu (m. 1970; div. 1980) Donna Nassar (m. 1980; div. 1990) Cindy Lee Berryhill (m. 1997)
- Children: 3

Paul S. Williams (May 19, 1948 – March 27, 2013) was an American music journalist, writer, and publisher who created Crawdaddy!, the first national US magazine of rock music criticism, in January 1966. He was a leading authority on the works of musicians Bob Dylan, Brian Wilson, and Neil Young, and science fiction writers Theodore Sturgeon and Philip K. Dick, for whose literary estate he served as executor. Williams was also the founder of the Philip K. Dick Society, which helped to publish Dick's work and establish his legacy.

== Career ==
While briefly enrolled at Swarthmore College, Williams created Crawdaddy!, the first national US magazine of rock music criticism, in January 1966 with the help of some of his fellow science fiction fans (he had previously produced science fiction fanzines). His aim was to reflect the sophistication brought to pop music by two albums released in 1965: Bob Dylan's Bringing It All Back Home and the Beatles' Rubber Soul. The first issue was ten mimeographed pages written entirely by Williams. In that issue, he declared that Crawdaddy! would include "neither pin-ups nor news-briefs" and that "the specialty of this magazine is intelligent writing about pop ..." He left the magazine in 1968 and reclaimed the title in 1993, but had to end it in 2003 due to financial difficulties.

In 1968, Williams co-founded Entwhistle Books with Chester Anderson, David G. Hartwell, and Joel Hack, which published poetry and nonfiction by Williams, and novels by Tom Carson, Philip K. Dick, and others. Entwhistle continued until about the year 2000.

Williams was the author of more than 25 books, of which the best-known are Outlaw Blues, Das Energi, and Bob Dylan: Performing Artist, the acclaimed three-part series.

In 1981 he edited and published, with David G. Hartwell, the first book edition of The Universal Declaration of Human Rights (with the book entitled The International Bill of Human Rights), with a foreword by Jimmy Carter. Williams also made significant contributions to Hartwell's book-length analysis of science fiction, Age of Wonders: Exploring the World of Science Fiction (Walker & Co., 1985; ISBN 0-8027-0808-0), and Hartwell mentions Paul Williams prominently in the book's acknowledgments.

His final published books were The 20th Century's Greatest Hits (a "Top 40" list that includes movies, books & other documents) (2000) and the last volume of his critical look at the music of Bob Dylan – Bob Dylan: Mind Out of Time (Performing Artist Vol. 3, 1987-2000) (2004).

== Association with Philip K. Dick ==
In the spring of 1967 Williams was introduced to the fiction of Philip K. Dick by underground cartoonists Trina Robbins, Bhob Stewart and Art Spiegelman. He introduced himself to Dick in August 1968 at the 26th World Science Fiction Convention in Berkeley, California, beginning a friendship that lasted through the rest of Dick's life.

In 1974, Williams began working on a profile of Dick for Rolling Stone. "The True Stories of Philip K. Dick", which appeared in the November 6, 1975 issue of the magazine, covered a variety of subjects, including many theories about the 1971 break-in of Dick's home in San Rafael, California, a 1972 suicide attempt in British Columbia, his subsequent move to Orange County, California, the politics of the era, and the relationship of Dick's drug use (including his amphetamine addiction and infrequent LSD experimentation) to his writing career.

Williams was Dick's literary executor for several years after Dick's death and used that position to get several of the author's previously unpublished neorealist novels into print.

From 1983 to 1992, Williams ran the Philip K. Dick Society along with Andy Watson and Keith Bowden in the UK. PKDS had some thousands of members internationally and was a significant influence in publicising Dick's work internationally. It published 30 quarterly newsletters, some of which included previously unpublished Dick material.

In 1986, Williams published Only Apparently Real: The World of Philip K. Dick, one of the first biographies of Dick.

Williams is a featured interviewee in three documentaries about Dick: a biographical documentary BBC2 released in 1994 as part of its Arena arts series called Philip K Dick: A Day in the Afterlife, The Gospel According to Philip K. Dick, which was produced in 2001, and The Penultimate Truth About Philip K. Dick, another biographical documentary film produced in 2007.

== Personal life ==
In early 1968, he was dating underground cartoonist Trina Robbins.

An acquaintance of Mel Lyman, Williams lived and worked at Lyman's intentional community at Fort Hill, Boston, for a few weeks in 1971, before he was dosed with LSD, locked in a closet, and had his eyeglasses taken away. Williams broke out and hitchhiked back to Boston, hiding out for weeks at his mother's house, for fear of them coming after him. Williams later told his wife, Cindy Lee Berryhill, "What good feelings I'd had for Lyman utterly changed at that point." According to Rolling Stone's David Felton, Williams told him he departed at night, as he felt he was being observed and would not be allowed to leave. According to Williams' official website, he also lived in a wilderness commune at Galley Bay in British Columbia.

In 1972, Williams married Sachiko Kanenobu, a Japanese singer-songwriter. They raised two children.

In the 1980s, he was married to Donna Nassar who provided many illustrations for Crawdaddy!'s second incarnation.

In 1992, Williams began a relationship with anti-folk co-founder and singer-songwriter Cindy Lee Berryhill, they married in 1997 and had a son in 2001, Alexander. Berryhill became his widow.

== Illness and death ==
In 1995, Williams suffered a brain injury from a bicycle accident. Though he apparently recovered, it was later discovered that he was suffering from chronic traumatic encephalopathy (CTE) dementia, the early onset of which was attributed to the brain injury.

For part of 2009, Williams lived in Encinitas, California with Berryhill and their 8-year-old son, Alexander Berryhill-Williams, but eventually had to enter a nursing home due to dementia. The medical bills were enormous, and the family asked for donations toward his continued medical care. On December 14, 2009, Paul Williams was accepted for Medi-Cal (Medicaid) coverage.

Williams died on March 27, 2013, at his home in California at age 64 from complications related to the bicycle accident.

== Books ==
- Outlaw Blues: A Book of Rock Music (E. P. Dutton, 1969); re-issued in 2000 by Entwhistle Books
- Time Between (Entwhistle Books, 1972) — "a hippie journal in the communes and on the road, December 1969–February 1970"
- Das Energi (Warner Books, 1973)
- Pushing Upward (Links, 1973)
- Apple Bay (Grand Central Publishing, 1976)
- Coming (Entwhistle Books, 1977)
- Right To Pass (Penguin Putnam, 1977)
- Heart of Gold (written 1978, published 1991, Entwhistle Books)
- Dylan — What Happened? (Entwhistle Books, 1979)
- "Introduction: the Making of Fox & Hare," in Anderson, Chester and Charles Marchant Stevenson, Fox & Hare: The Story of a Friday Evening. Entwhistle Books, Glen Ellen, California (1980)
- (with Robert Cole) The Book of Houses: An Astrological Guide to the Harvest Cycle in Human Life (Entwhistle Books, 1980)
- Common Sense: A Guide to the Present Situation (1982)
- Waking Up Together (Entwhistle Books, 1984)
- Only Apparently Real: The World of Philip K. Dick, Arbor House, New York, ISBN 978-0877958000 (1986)
- Remember Your Essence (Harmony Books, 1987)
- The Map, or Rediscovering Rock and Roll: a Journey (And Books, 1988)
- Rock and Roll: The 100 Best Singles (Entwhistle Books, 1993)
- Bob Dylan: Performing Artist, Vol 1. (Underwood–Miller, Novato, 1990)
- Bob Dylan: Performing Artist, Vol 2: The Middle Years 1974–1986 (Underwood Books, 1992)
- Energi Inscriptions (Carroll & Graf Publishers, 1995)
- Bob Dylan: Watching The River Flow (Omnibus Press, 1996)
- Neil Young: Love To Burn London, New York, Paris, Sydney: Omnibus Press. ISBN 0-934558-19-1 (1997)
- Brian Wilson & The Beach Boys – How Deep Is The Ocean? (Omnibus Press, 1997)
- The 20th Century’s Greatest Hits: A Top 40 List (Forge Books, 2000)
- Bob Dylan: Mind Out of Time (Performing Artist Vol. 3, 1987-2000) (Omnibus, 2004)

=== Books as editor ===
- The International Bill of Human Rights, Glen Ellen, CA : Entwhistle Books, foreword by Jimmy Carter, ISBN 0-934558-06-X (1981)
- The Complete Stories of Theodore Sturgeon, Vol. I-XII (North Atlantic Books, 1992–2010)
