= Peter Dizozza =

American composer

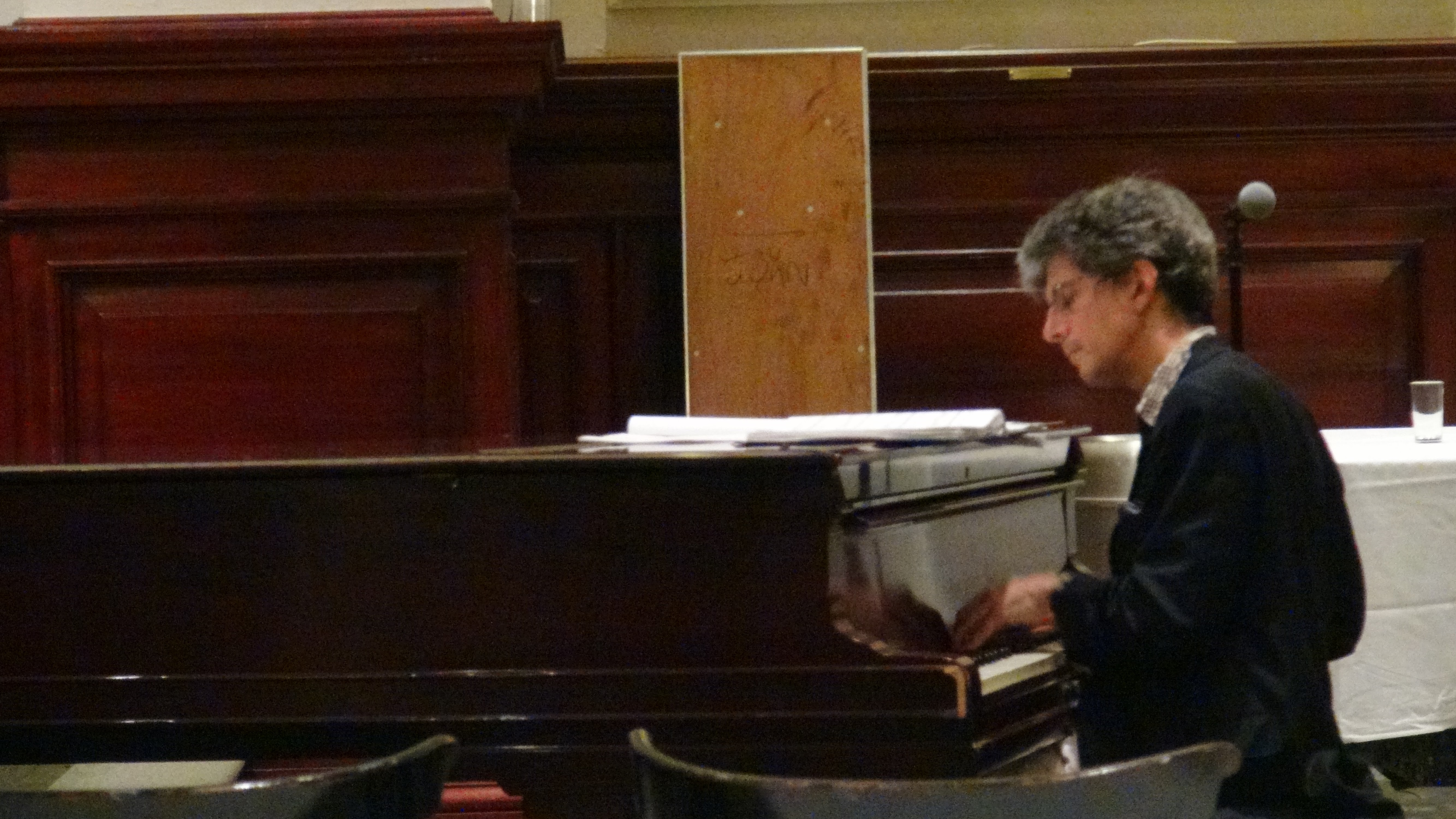
- Born: Peter William Dizozza; September 5, 1958 (age 68); Forest Hills, New York, U.S.
- Occupations: Composer, pianist, attorney

Peter William Dizozza (born 5 September 1958) is an American music composer who also produces supplemental material as a writer, pianist, performer, photographer, and filmmaker. Since 2000 he has been the director of the WAH Theater at the Williamsburg Art & Historical Center.

== Life and career ==
Peter William Dizozza was born on September 5, 1958, in Forest Hills (Queens), New York. He and his sister, Monica, are the two children of an attorney, Nicholas Frederick Dizozza, who came from a large family in Greenpoint, Brooklyn, and a teacher, Madeleine, the only child of Margaret and Anthony Carillo who settled in Forest Hills. Although a fourth-generation New Yorker through both his grandmothers' lineages, Dizozza's ancestry is Italian. His paternal grandfather, Peter Dizozza, was born in Ginosa (Apulia), and his maternal grandfather was born in San Giuseppe (Naples). Dizozza had a conservative and strongly Catholic upbringing. He attended Our Lady Queen of Martyrs grammar school and Archbishop Molloy High School in Queens, New York, and then went to Queens College, graduating with a Humanities Degree in Music, English, and Philosophy. After a series of summer jobs with the City of New York obtained through his maternal grandmother's friendship with a Brooklyn political leader, Meade Esposito, in 1981, at the age of 23, Dizozza joined the City Comptroller's Office and worked as an assistant, financial analyst, and court representative under Harrison J. Goldin and Elizabeth Holtzman until 1991. It was while working at the Comptroller's Office by day and attending St. John's Law School at night that Dizozza began directing music at the Bronx community theatre and became enamored with it. He graduated from Law School in 1986 and in 1988, moved to the East Village, Manhattan, and began performing his own material. In 1991 he was admitted into the BMI Lehman Engel Musical Theater Workshop as a composer and began legal employment as an associate with The Law Office of Jerald D. Werlin, a firm specializing in personal injury in Long Island City. His monthly piano/singer/songwriter shows began in November 1995 at—and because of—an open-stage anti-folk anti-hoot organized and hosted by Lach at SideWalk Bar-Restaurant.

Dizozza's family vacationed at Candlewood Lake in Connecticut. That led to some acting in children's commercials of DuRona studios and a brief appearance in a wedding scene as an extra in the Sylvester Stallone vehicle The Lords of Flatbush.

Since 1964 Dizozza has produced a steady output of primarily musical original material. To contain and administer his creative catalogue, he registered in 1996 a D/B/A and started a website under the name Cinema VII, reviving a collective founded in 1972 by a high school friend, Mike Lindsay.

== Plays and productions ==
- Prepare to meet your maker – Musical mystery play with 30 performances and a soundtrack recorded by Alex Abrash and David Baker at Electric Lady Studio in September 2001.
- The Golf Wars – First reading at La MaMa, E.T.C. on April 5, 2002. Soundtrack, Songs of The Golf Wars, produced by Major Matt Mason USA for Olive Juice Music. Produced at The WAH Theatre in conjunction with World Peace Exhibit, 2002, directed by Tom Nondorf. Revived as a band performance at Joe's Pub at The Joseph Papp Public Theater and in a revised staging by Tom Nondorf at La Mama, in time for the November elections in 2006.
- The Marriage at the Statue of Liberty (2003) – Wrote and produced for the Williamsburg Art & Historical Center Brave Destiny Exhibition, a modern ballet with dialogue after Cocteau (inspired by Les mariés de la tour Eiffel, the surrealist ballet with dialogue by the French Poet/Filmmaker Jean Cocteau). Features the Emiaj Dance Troupe.
- Contributed short plays to the Manhattan Theatre Source 48 Hour Spontaneous Combustion Production (Gala & Ligeti), March 24–26, 2002, and to the Confronting Chekhov festival, 2009 (Not the Ravine) and Dramatizing Dante festival, 2010 (The Afterdeath, a Francesca and Paolo mini-opera) produced by The Brooklyn Playwrights Collective.
- The Last Dodo – Premiered at the Williamsburg Art & Historical Center, playing from February through April 2001, at Baby Jupiter, 170 Stanton Street at Orchard Street, New York, NY. Soundtrack produced by Aashish Pathak. A film sketch was completed in 2003.
- A Question of Solitude, TentagatneT, The Last Dodo, The Peace Mission, Witchfinders, Coppélia, and The Eleventh Hour originated at La MaMa, E.T.C.'s Experiments concert reading series, curated by George Ferencz (1998–2009).
- Marilyn Majeski directed Coppélia for La Mama then subsequently produced the show through Wing and a Prayer Productions at the Gene Frankel Theatre Workshop in 1998.
- Produced staged readings of The Eleventh Hour (1999) at the La Tea Theatre in the Clemente Soto Vélez Cultural and Educational Center. John Seroff revised and directed a sold-out production of The Eleventh Hour at the Williamsburg Art & Historical Center. Cast members included Jeffrey Lewis, Cheryl LaRosa, Kimya Dawson, Abbey Valdez, Daniel Bernstein and Toby Goodshank.
- The Sea Heiress (2004) – For two voices, piano, clarinet and baritone sax, produced at the Williamsburg Art & Historical Center.
- Tentagatnet (2005) – For five actors, cello, clarinet, guitar and flute (La MaMa, E.T.C.'s Experiments '05) revived for a full production in La MaMa, E.T.C.'s 2007 Experimenta! Festival, directed by George Ferencz.
- O (2006) – A recovered memory play (La MaMa, E.T.C.'s Experiments '06). Its sequel is Cow City (2008).
- 2.2.2 (2007) – Also known as "Hermaphroditism Through the Ages," produced in "Oh Happy Three" as part of the Straight from the Source Summer Series at Manhattan Theatre Source)
- Cow City (2008) – produced in "Oh Happy Three 2008" as part of the Playground Summer Series at Manhattan Theatre Source)
- Paradise Found (2008) – produced in conjunction with Milton's 400th Birthday Art Exhibition by the Williamsburg Art & Historical Center.
- The Woman Artist's Journey (2009) – a program of 5 plays by Maria Micheles, C.J. Ehrlich, Alaina Hammond, Phil Kaplan and Allan Lefcowitz, produced with the Brooklyn Playwrights Collective to celebrate the Woman Forward Art Exhibition at the Williamsburg Art & Historical Center.
- Music Composer for 155 First Avenue (The Epic Adventures of the Theater for the New Syzygy) (2012) and its sequel, 155 Through the Roof (2014) by Toby Armour produced by Theater for the New City
- As music director for Forest Hills Gardens Women's Club, provided scores for The Great Enchanted Forest (2000, revived in 2015 as "Out of the Forest") and for Murder by Music (a detectives musical, 2001)
- Composed music for Convertible by Elizabeth West Versalie, produced at La MaMa, E.T.C.'s main stage in 1997. Soundtrack featured the voice of Catherine Russell (singer).
- Performs monthly piano set at the Sidewalk Bar-Restaurant (94 Ave A at E6th St, NY) where he originated the monologues/song cycles Pro-Choice on Mental Health, Exploring a Fascination with Things that Spin, When the Kangaroos Come Out, The Blood of a Poet, The Secret to Good Sex (Abstinence), and The Philosopher's Stone, and the short play, Shipping the Satellite. The audio recordings of the Pro-Choice on Mental Health songs and text are produced by Joe Bendik; this was Dizozza's first solo album and combined 7 songs with dialog from the play.
- Wrote over 200 unique songs and numerous works for solo piano
- Composed song settings for poems of Thomas Hardy and T. S. Eliot, and Shakespeare's As You Like It and The Tempest, which toured city parks during the summer of 1991
- Composed a choral score for Neil Ericksen's musical play based on the myth of Atalanta, entitled Legs Like These (QWIRK's Actor's Equity Showcase, One Dream Theatre, 1992).
- In the cabaret field (Don't Tell Mama, Trocadero, Duplex) he collaborated with Margaret O'Hanlon (1987–1988) on Infidelity, Infidelity Reformed, Tropical Depression, and The Hoagy and Peter Show, and with Lisa Dery and Tyr Throne on A Nite of Love and Possession (1996–1997).
- Wrote and performed a calypso theatre piece, A Trip to Bermuda for Charles Strouse's A. R. Gurney Project as part of the ASCAP Music Theatre Workshop.
- Assistant Conductor on We Are Innocent, an album of Julius and Ethel Rosenberg letters set by the composer, Leonard Lehrman.
- Helped, with Leonard Lehrman, to reconstruct the score and present a backers' audition for Maggie Da Silva's production of Marc Blitzstein's labor opera, No For An Answer.
- For reading series produced for The Neighborhood Playhouse by Patricia Watt, he began writing introductory songs for play collections, particularly Bruce Jay Friedman's 4-Play directed by Steve Ditmyer. With Mr. Friedman, he presented 4-Play as part of the 2006 75th Anniversary Season of the John Drew Theatre in East Hampton's Guild Hall.
- Author of three novels, Storm Cloud (1981), The Resurrection (1974 revised 1985), and Mark of the Librarian (1998).
- Graduate of the Humanities Program and Aaron Copland School of Music (Queens College, 1981), St. John's Law School (1986), the BMI Lehman Engel Musical Theater Workshop (1994), and even, in 1997, the Landmark Education Self Expression and Leadership Program, the offspring of Erhard Seminars Training or EST.
- Artist and in-house counsel for Cinema VII, an entertainment collective that administers his creative catalogue
- Early movies, The Ruins (1971) and Angels: Tour of the Vultures (1977) received screenings in 2000 at film festivals, including a silent film/live music event at Manhattan Theatre Source.
- Helped organize permits and act as NYC Liaison for Anti-folk Fests in Tompkins Square and Central Park since 1999
- Participant in the XXXIV Congress of the Union Internationale des Avocats, Strasbourg
- Practicing attorney

== Memberships ==
- The Entertainment Committee of the Association of the Bar of the City of New York. Chair, 2006–2009 & 2012–2015
- The Lambs Club
- The Dramatists Guild
- Bar of the State of New York
