= SideWalk Cafe =

Former restaurant and music venue in Manhattan, New York

The SideWalk Cafe
- Sidewalk
- Interactive map of The SideWalk Cafe
- Address: 94 Avenue A
- Location: New York, NY 10009, USA
- Coordinates: 40.72546°N 73.98376°W
- Type: Nightclub

Construction
- Opened: 1985
- Closed: 2019

Website
- sidewalkny.com

The SideWalk Cafe was a music venue and restaurant/cafe in East Village, New York City founded in 1985. It became a known venue for its underground music scene, and in particular, was known as being the center for anti-folk in the United States. It offered an eclectic mix of local and national acts ranging from DIY, avant garde music, indie rock, and jazz to pop music and electronic music. The venue also hosted poetry readings, comedy and live-band karaoke. The Local East Village, at the time part of The New York Times, referred to the SideWalk Cafe and its music scene as a "gift to the neighborhood".

A number of well-known acts performed at the Sidewalk at the beginning of their career including Regina Spektor, Lana Del Rey, Hamell on Trial, Lach, The Moldy Peaches and Nicole Atkins. The Sidewalk Cafe was also home to an open mic night that was one of the oldest and largest traditional open mics in the city, garnering the name "the king of NYC open-mic nights." The open mic was founded by Lach in 1994 and subsequently run by Ben Krieger (2008–2014) and finally Somer Bingham (2014–2019). It also hosted the bi-annual New York Antifolk Festival, which featured the largest gathering of anti-folk musicians in the nation.

Artists that performed regularly at the Sidewalk Cafe included: Elastic No-No Band, Dots Will Echo, Alan Merrill, John S. Hall, Jeffrey Lewis, Peter Dizozza, Matt Van Winkle, and Schwervon!.

Sidewalk's last weekend was Feb 23–24, 2019, after which it closed.
