= Lach =

American singer-songwriter

Lach is a singer-songwriter, writer, broadcaster, and the founder of the Antifolk movement in New York City. His work includes six studio albums, the BBC Radio 4 series The Lach Chronicles, the novel Langdimania, and the poetry collection The Thin Book of Poems.

== Career ==
Lach is a mononymous artist who first emerged on the New York music scene as lead singer and principal songwriter of the punk band Proper Id, playing CBGB circa 1979. In 1981, Proper Id released the single "Electric Boy" backed with "Sound The Alarm", which was featured on WNEW-FM in New York.

In the early 1980s, Lach began performing at Greenwich Village folk clubs including Folk City and the Speakeasy. His punk-influenced approach met resistance from the established folk scene, but also drew a growing circle of like-minded performers, including Kirk Kelly, Billy Nova and Roger Manning, who shared his dissatisfaction with the Village folk establishment. In mid-1984, Lach moved to the Lower East Side and opened The Hidden Fortress, an illegal after-hours club in his loft on Rivington Street, later known simply as The Fort. The opening of the Fort launched the Antifolk scene, with the club and the weekly Antihoot at its center. The Fort also became an artistic home for other members of the first generation of Antifolk artists, notably spoken-word performer John S. Hall and singer-songwriters Zane Campbell and Cindy Lee Berryhill. In 1985, Lach and Kirk Kelly recorded together as The Folk Brothers, releasing the cassette-only All Folked Up With Nowhere To Go.

By 1986, growing media attention had brought police pressure that forced the original Rivington Street Fort to close. Lach decided to make The Fort a mobile club and its next incarnation was at Sophie's Bar in Manhattan's East Village, where the Antihoot nights provided a stage for artists including Michelle Shocked, Brenda Kahn and Paul Sanchez. Bob Dylan came to The Fort at Sophie's to see Lach perform, a visit Lach later recounted in the first episode of his BBC Radio 4 series, The Lach Chronicles, "The Night Dylan Came".

By 1988, Lach had moved The Fort to the Chameleon Club in Manhattan's East Village, where the Antihoot continued as a center of the Antifolk scene. Paleface was discovered there by music manager Danny Fields, while Beck asked Lach for songwriting advice. Lach told him, "If a weird looking dog walks by, and you're hungry for pizza, write a song about that. Just make it you." Beck later described his exposure to the New York Antifolk scene as "a crash course that solidified what I was doing," and returned to Los Angeles with new songs and ideas.

In 1990, Lach was signed to Gold Castle Records by Danny Goldberg, and released his debut album Contender, produced by Tom Goodkind of The Washington Squares and performed with Proper Id. Writing in Spin, Charlie Ahearn described Lach as “a local legend and spokesman of a radical new generation,” while Billboard reporter Paul Verna named Contender among his ten favorite albums of 1990, calling it the “Best antidote to faux folk.”

From 1992 to 1993, Lach was based in San Francisco, where he hosted the Antihoot open stage weekly at the Sacred Grounds in the Upper Haight. Artists who joined the scene there included Lenny Molotov and Mister Scarecrow. During this period, Lach's vinyl EP Family Values Pack was released by Crystal Egg Records, featuring Lach's "The Hillary Clinton Song" which received national media coverage.

Upon his return to New York in 1993, Lach brought The Fort to the back room of the Sidewalk Cafe in Manhattan's East Village, where he established the weekly Antihoot open stage and booked live performances on the other nights of the week. In September 1994, New York magazine devoted a three-page feature to The Fort at Sidewalk Cafe, writing that since founding it Lach had turned it into "a genuine 'scene' in an era with few," and identifying Beck, Michelle Shocked, Brenda Kahn, Cindy Lee Berryhill, Paleface and King Missile among artists the Fort had helped foster. International coverage followed, and by December 1995 The New York Times described Lach as "a Manhattan institution", noting that the Antifolk scene he had built outlived the Greenwich Village folk establishment it was founded in opposition to.

This first Sidewalk era culminated in the 1996 compilation Lach’s Antihoot: Live From the Fort at Sidewalk Cafe, released by Shanachie/Fortified and featuring performers from the scene including Hamell on Trial, The Humans and Tom Clark. Reviewing the album, The Music Paper described The Fort as "one of the most vital venues for new musical expression in New York."

Following the compilation, Lach began managing comedian Rick Shapiro. In 1998, Lach produced Shapiro's debut album, Unconditional Love, recorded live at The Fort and released on Fortified Records; Billboard described it as the first release under Fortified's new distribution agreement with Big Daddy Distribution, calling the album "hard-edged" and "uncompromising". Under Lach's management, Shapiro appeared as Shakey in the 2001 film Pootie Tang, and performed at Yuk Yuk's in Toronto, where his show drew national press attention.

In 1999, Lach returned to recording with Blang!, his first studio album since Contender, produced by Richard Barone and released on Fortified Records. Billboard described it as "a wholly enjoyable voyage into a strange and brilliant musical mind", while Performing Songwriter placed the record in a lineage running from Greenwich Village folk clubs to CBGB's and added, "Blang! is a double-espresso of an album. Revved up and relevant, with a cool mix of humor and bite."

With the release of Blang!, Lach began performing nationally while continuing to run the Antihoot and book performances at Sidewalk. Jeffrey Lewis began playing at Sidewalk in 1998, followed around 1999 by Adam Green and Kimya Dawson, whose group, The Moldy Peaches, became part of a circle that also included Grey Revell, Patsy Grace, Turner Cody and, shortly afterward, Regina Spektor. Green later recalled that after Lach booked him for a full show, he called his bandmates in Washington and told them, "There’s this really cool thing going on in New York. You guys have to come and check this out." Grey Revell remembered the period as one in which "it all came together in a really short time," with "nothing but pure creativity happening at all times."

Around the same time, Karen O, later of Yeah Yeah Yeahs, began performing at Lach's Antihoot and later formed the acoustic duo Unitard with Nick Zinner, which became part of the Sidewalk Antifolk scene. Recalling the venue, Karen O said, “I knew that anyone could just go and do whatever they wanted; that was the vibe.”

Fortified Records also expanded its roster during this period. Matt Roth, whom Lach named Major Matt Mason USA, had appeared on the 1996 Antihoot compilation and signed to Fortified in 1999. Shortly after signing, Matt's debut album Me Me Me was released by Fortified Records nationally and subsequently licensed to Shoeshine Records for release in the UK and Europe.

During 2000, Lach began work on his next album while continuing to book and host the Antifolk scene at Sidewalk Cafe.

In September 2001, Lach released his third studio album, Kids Fly Free, on Fortified Records. Produced by Richard Barone and recorded at the Magic Shop in NYC, the album featured Television drummer Billy Ficca, bassist Roy Edroso and keyboardist Drew Blood, along with a larger group of musicians from the Sidewalk and Antifolk community. Daniel Johnston illustrated Lach's lyrics throughout a 16-page booklet accompanying the album. AllMusic's Alex Henderson wrote that Blang! remained Lach's "most essential album" but that Kids Fly Free "runs a close second".

In November 2001, Lach launched the Up All Night open mic night at London's Spice of Life. NME reviewed the event, describing Lach as "a raised middle finger to the folk purists" and noting a performance by Sgt Buzfuz (Joe Murphy). Murphy went on to name his monthly events at London's 12 Bar Club and his Antifolk record label, Blang Records, after Lach's 1999 album Blang!. Also in attendance was Filthy Pedro, who later recalled first meeting Tom Mayne there; the two subsequently organized British Antifolk shows and festivals as well as hosting radio programs together.

Lach's British activity continued into 2002. For its UK release, Kids Fly Free was licensed to Track Records, the label relaunched in 1999 by veteran manager Ian Grant. In March 2002, Billboard reported that Kids Fly Free had attracted the attention of The Agency Group, which had booked Lach for a month-long UK tour that April, and described the record as his "strongest, most assured set". In August, Mojo described him as New York's inventor of Antifolk, concluding that "something admirably maverick stirs."

By 2003, Lach had become singer-songwriter Nellie McKay's first manager after hearing her perform at The Antihoot at Sidewalk Cafe. The New York Observer, noting that six months earlier "nobody knew much of anything about her," reported that Lach "set about trying to make as many people as possible know who she was." Agent Joe Brauner of Monterey Peninsula Artists later contacted Lach after reading a Time Out New York profile and committed to represent her after hearing a four-song demo, before seeing her perform live. Lach received offers to sign McKay from several labels including Columbia, Virgin, Blue Note and Verve. Columbia A&R executive Mitchell Cohen came to see McKay perform at Sidewalk Cafe, obtained her demo and called an executive meeting to press for signing her; after a bidding war, Columbia Records signed McKay. By mid-2004, Lach and McKay had parted ways professionally; subsequent coverage identified her mother, Robin Pappas, as McKay's manager.

Also in 2003, Lach's Fortified Records released War All The Time by New York Antifolk duo Testosterone Kills. Windy City Times called the album "an exceptional disc of tunes". The following year, the album was nominated for an Outmusic Award for Outstanding New Recording, Duo or Group.

In 2004, after separate UK support engagements opening for Suzanne Vega, Television and Fine Young Cannibals, Lach released his fourth studio album, Today, on Fortified Records. Like his previous release, Today was produced by Richard Barone and recorded with bassist Roy Edroso and drummer Billy Ficca. The album received a four-star review in Mojo, with Manish Agarwal describing Lach as an “acute tunesmith.”

In February 2005, Lach brought a group of British Antifolk performers, including Filthy Pedro, David Cronenberg's Wife, Milk Kan, JJ Crash and Soraya Allen, to New York for the Winter Antifolk Festival at Sidewalk Cafe. Later that spring, Lach returned to Britain for a three-week solo acoustic tour, including five dates double-billed with Casbah Club, whose lineup included Simon Townshend, Bruce Foxton, Bruce Watson and Mark Brzezicki.

During this period, Lach also managed The Analogues, singer Lydia Doran and guitarist Jim Saxa. Fortified Management had begun working with the duo in 2004 and by late 2005, they were recording with Richard Barone, who produced their self-titled EP released in 2006.

During July 2006, Lach returned to Britain for a tour that opened with "Lach's Antifolk UK Special" at the Camden Barfly with Lach headlining a bill featuring UK Antifolk acts Milk Kan, Filthy Pedro, David Cronenberg's Wife and Sgt Buzfuz. The tour ended in Brighton where Lach appeared as a special guest at the Brighton anti-folk festival "Antifest". In September, Time Out London in an article about secret scenes in London printed an illustrated Antifolk family tree showing Lach, Bob Dylan and The New York Dolls in the roots and UK antifolk acts in the leaves and branches.

By early 2007, Lach was recording his fifth album at Studio G in Brooklyn. The album, The Calm Before, was released by Fortified Records on March 25, 2008, and was recorded and mixed by Tony Maimone (of Pere Ubu), produced by Lach, and featured the return of Billy Ficca on drums with Mike Visceglia on bass, and backing vocals from Richard Barone, Chris Barron and Lydia Ooghe. Writing for AllMusic, Ned Raggett said, "The Calm Before is good-spirited, done for love and art, but in the end won't speak to anyone beyond Lach's already established fan base."

On June 30, 2008, Lach ended his fifteen-year tenure at Sidewalk Cafe by hosting his final Antihoot at the East Village club. Time Out New York described Lach as an "East Village fixture" and told readers to "come watch an era in NYC music come to an end." Ben Krieger subsequently took over Sidewalk's music booking and began hosting the Monday open stage.

By May 2009 Lach was touring the UK again, this time double-billed with Neil Halstead of Slowdive and Mojave 3. At the tour's end, Halstead invited Lach to record using local musicians at his studio in Cornwall. Halstead also contributed vocals and instrumentation to several of the tracks.

In 2010, Lach began running individual nights at Webster Hall in Manhattan, bringing his weekly Antihoot to the venue as well as showcase nights. Lach later became executive producer of the venue and launched the Art Bar gallery space within the club.

Ramshackle Heart, produced by Lach and Neil Halstead, was released in 2011 by Song, by Toad Records. The album was subsequently re-released by Fortified Records in 2013. Writing in Uncut, Nigel Williamson said Ramshackle Heart "captures all that's best about the 'anti-folk' movement: a mix of beat aesthetic, punk attitude and smartass wit."

In 2013, BBC Radio 4 began broadcasting The Lach Chronicles, a series written and performed by Lach and produced by Dabster Productions. Three series were broadcast between 2013 and 2016. The series was selected as a "Top Choice" by Radio Times and as a "Pick of the Day" by both The Observer and Scottish Mail on Sunday.

The Thin Book of Poems, Lach's debut poetry collection, was published in 2015 by Fortified Publishing in association with Desert Hearts Publishing.

Langdimania, Lach's debut novel, was published in 2023 by The Book Whisperers. Langdimania was named April 2023 Debut of the Month by LoveReading4Kids, with the site's Editorial Expert Joanne Owen writing, "This zany fantasy adventure takes readers on a rollercoaster ride through the wild imagination of its 12-year-old hero" and "It’s fast, it’s funny".

== Discography ==
- Contender (1990)
- Blang! (1999)
- Kids Fly Free (2001)
- Today (2004)
- The Calm Before (2008)
- Ramshackle Heart (2011)
