= Garage Orchestra =

Studio album by Cindy Lee Berryhill
- Released: 1994
- Genre: Pop
- Label: Cargo
- Producers: Cindy Lee Berryhill, Michael Harris

Cindy Lee Berryhill chronology
Naked Movie Star (1989)	Garage Orchestra (1994)	Straight Outta Marysville (1996)

Garage Orchestra is an album by the American musician Cindy Lee Berryhill, released in 1994. It marked a turn from the folk material of Berryhill's past, to a more orchestral pop sound. Berryhill was working in a San Diego bookstore when Cargo Music suggested that she record an album. Berryhill subsequently named her band after the album.

== Production ==
The album was produced by Berryhill and Michael Harris. It was recorded in San Diego, over six 10-hour days. "Song for Brian" is a reverie about falling in love with Brian Wilson.

== Critical reception ==
Professional ratings
Review scores
Source	Rating
AllMusic	4.5/5 stars
The Encyclopedia of Popular Music	3/5 stars
MusicHound Rock: The Essential Album Guide	4/5 stars

Trouser Press wrote that "an army of instrumentalists—playing everything from clarinet and cello to banjo, vibraphone and tympani—helps Berryhill deliver inventive, thoughtful, entertaining songs that fully deserve the diverse junior Phil Spector productions." Rolling Stone noted that, "to songs whose raw, free ecstasies recall Patti Smith, Berryhill adds strings-and-timpani flourishes that echo Brian Wilson."

The Philadelphia Inquirer stated that the music is "filled with Kurt Weill-meets-Brian Wilson forays." The San Diego Union-Tribune called the album "a delightful collection of pithy songs that are simultaneously earthy and evocative, lyrical and lilting." The Herald & Review listed Garage Orchestra as the seventh best album of 1994.

AllMusic wrote: "The massed backing vocals, buzzing string sections, woodwinds, and [Randy] Hoffman's tympani, vibraphone, marimba, and other noisemakers give the songs a sound that's big and rich with nuance, but the music still has a playful quality, just ramshackle enough to be loose but still painting the big picture she requires with the layers of sound at her disposal."

== Track listing ==
No.	Title	Length
1.	"Father of the Seventh Son"
2.	"I Wonder Why"
3.	"Radio Astronomy"
4.	"Gary Handeman"
5.	"Song for Brian"
6.	"UFO Suite"
7.	"I Want Stuff"
8.	"Every Someone Tonight"
9.	"Scariest Thing in the World"
10.	"Etude for Ph. Machine"
