= Nervus Rex =

American new wave pop band

Nervus Rex was an American new wave pop band, whose roots were in the New York City independent music scene, its members frequenting clubs such as CBGB and Max's Kansas City. After Lauren Agnelli answered an ad for a "CBGB type band" in The Village Voice, she and Shaun Brighton met one night at CBGB and discovered a connection in a mutual appreciation of bands such as Talking Heads, the Cramps, and the Velvet Underground. Agnelli was working at the time as a rock critic for The Village Voice and Creem magazine under the pen name Trixie A. Balm.

Soon joined by Miriam Linna, drumming for the Cramps at the time, and later Jonathan Gildersleeve, Nervus Rex started to develop an uptempo pop sound focusing on driving surf guitar twang and danceable rhythms. Their initial bass player, Lew Eklund, left the band shortly after Gildersleeve joined. Artist and Ohio transplant Dianne Athey took over on the bass after Eklund left, and soon added to the group musically and in terms of image. In 1978 the band released a single on the Cleverly Named Record Company, "Don't Look" b/w "Love Affair". Two years later, Blondie producer Mike Chapman and his partner, Nicky Chinn (Chinnichap), signed the band to the Dreamland label.

Nervus Rex only released a single album on Dreamland, the 1980s self-titled Nervus Rex. That release, having been on hold for a year while the dynamic new wave music scene flourished with talented contemporaries like the B-52's booming in popularity, the Nervus Rex debut release met with little success and the band continued playing in clubs for several more years before breaking up in the early 1980s. Nervus Rex played on double bills with the Pretenders, Squeeze, the Bloodless Pharaohs (Brian Setzer's first band), and Richard Hell and the Voidoids.

After the band's demise, Agnelli joined the Washington Squares, a new generation beat folkgroup who released two LPs and earned a Grammy nomination. She went on to play with the Dave Rave Conspiracy in the U.S. and Canada as well as the duo Agnelli & Rave, and was co-writer and featured vocalist on Kiss of Fire, an album released in the U.S. and Japan by Brave Combo. More recently she has enjoyed a solo career with a CD release in 2004 on the BongoBeat label, Love Always Follows Me. In 2011, she co-produces Small Town Concert Series with her husband in CT and they have a 5-piece Americana Group, Amalgamated Muck, who play frequent shows and are working on their first release. Agnelli also continues to write songs and record with Dave Rave as co-writer and co-producer.

Shaun Brighton (now Shawn Brighton) went on to form the Puppets, a band whose hit dance single "The Way of Life" on Canadian company Quality Records reached the No. 3 position on the Billboard Dance Chart, went to No. 1 on the regional New York charts, and fared even better in Canada. There are, in fact, at least six known different mixes of the song on vinyl and CD from various countries. The band toured briefly to major audiences but soon disbanded due to both internal disagreements and legal problems between the producers, Quality Records, and Shawn Brighton as to ownership issues.

Dianne Athey's band after "the Rex" was the Riddles, led by Karen LeSage (formerly of The Gloo Girls). The Riddles worked from 1999 to 2004, playing gigs and recording. She currently works as a fine art painter and graphic artist for Town & Country.

In 2010, Brighton moved to Miami Beach, where he works as an art dealer, creates art and continues to write songs. A possible musical reunion with Agnelli, Brighton, and bassist Athey is under discussion.

== Resources ==
- Lauren Agnelli
- Nervus Rex
- CBGB
- Layne Heath, Michael, "Rocking Your Way to the Middle: Four Bands from CBGB's Second Golden Era" Perfect Sound Forever online music magazine, January 2002.
