= Only Apparently Real: The World of Philip K. Dick =

Philip K. Dick biography by Paul Williams

Only Apparently Real: The World of Philip K. Dick is a biography by Paul Williams published by Arbor House in 1986.

== Plot summary ==
Only Apparently Real: The World of Philip K. Dick is a biography of Philip K. Dick by Williams, who interviewed Dick in the 1970s for Rolling Stone.

== Reception ==
J. Michael Caparula reviewed Only Apparently Real: The World of Philip K. Dick in Space Gamer/Fantasy Gamer No. 81. Caparula commented that "This is a penetrating portrait of one of the greatest and most influential SF writer of the past thirty years."

Publishers Weekly stated: "The author has done a good job making this complex and unusual man understandable and sympathetic."

== Reviews ==
- Review by Debbie Notkin (1986) in Locus, #301 February 1986
- Review by John Clute (1986) in Fantasy Review, June 1986
- Review by Orson Scott Card (1986) in Worlds of If, September-November 1986
- Review by Don D'Ammassa (1986) in Science Fiction Chronicle, #86 November 1986
