= Chester Anderson =

American writer

- Born: Chester Valentine John Anderson; August 11, 1932; Stoneham, Massachusetts, U.S.
- Died: April 11, 1991 (aged 58); Homer, Georgia
- Other names: C.V.J. Anderson; John Valentine
- Education: University of Miami
- Occupations: Novelist, poet, editor
- Notable work: The Butterfly Kid

Underhound, vol. 1. no. 4 (1960). One of Chester Anderson's early little magazines, satirizing the beatnik coffee house scene in North Beach.

Chester Valentine John Anderson (August 11, 1932 – April 11, 1991) was an American novelist, poet, and editor in the underground press.

== Biography ==
Raised in Florida, he attended the University of Miami from 1952 to 1956, before becoming a beatnik coffee house poet in Greenwich Village and San Francisco's North Beach. As a poet, he wrote under the name C.V.J. Anderson and edited the little magazines Beatitude and Underhound. In journalism, he specialized in rock and roll. In that area, he was a friend of Paul Williams and edited Crawdaddy! for a few issues in 1968–1969.

He also wrote science fiction, because of Michael Kurland (the two of them having collaborated on Ten Years to Doomsday in 1964). Anderson's The Butterfly Kid, published in 1967, is the first part of what is called the Greenwich Village Trilogy, with Kurland writing the second book (The Unicorn Girl) and the third volume (The Probability Pad) written by T.A. Waters. The novel was nominated for the 1968 Hugo Award for Best Novel. The Butterfly Kid, and Anderson's few other genre works are associated with New Wave science fiction.

He was also a gifted musician, playing two-part inventions with two recorders simultaneously, and playing duets with Laurence M. Janifer at the Cafe Rienzi.

He subsequently moved to San Francisco during the Summer of Love. Having bought a mimeograph with his second royalty check from The Butterfly Kid, Anderson and Claude Hayward were the founders of the Communications Company (ComCo), the publishing arm of the anarchist guerrilla street theater group The Diggers. Through ComCo, Anderson circulated a number of his own bitter broadside polemics in Haight-Ashbury, including "Uncle Tim's Children," with its infamous, often-quoted line, "Rape is as common as bullshit on Haight Street." Joan Didion described the role Anderson and ComCo played in the Haight in her 1967 essay for The Saturday Evening Post, "Slouching Towards Bethlehem", which was later included in the book of the same name.

In 1968, Anderson co-founded Entwhistle Books with Paul Williams, David G. Hartwell, and Joel Hack. After his stint with Crawadaddy! Anderson was connected for a brief period with the underground newspaper Tuesday's Child and with Peace Press, a small movement print shop in Los Angeles.

He published two works, both of them thinly disguised memoirs (one, Puppies, published under the name "John Valentine," about sexual excess in the 1960s) with Entwhistle Books. (Several scenes in Puppies were set in the offices of Tuesday's Child, where Anderson slept in a back room while putting out the paper and cruising the nearby Sunset Strip.)

He lived for a number of years in Mendocino, California, where he collaborated with local artist Charles Marchant Stevenson on their proto-graphic novel Fox & Hare: The Story of a Friday Evening (also published by Entwhistle Books). A number of science fiction and publishing personalities, including Norman Spinrad and Lou Stathis, posed on location for the illustrations in this book, which attempted to recreate a particular evening in Greenwich Village in the 1960s.

Anderson died in 1991 in Homer, Georgia, where he was living with relatives, at age 58.

== Bibliography ==
- (poems) Colloquy (San Francisco: Bolerium Books, 1960) — Handset and printed at The Bread & Wine Press by Harvey Wilder Bentley, San Francisco; self-published by the poet
- (poems) A Liturgy for Dragons and 17 Other Poems: 1953-1961 (New York: Chas. P. Young Company, 1961)
- The Pink Palace (Greenwich: Fawcett Publications, 1963)
- (with Michael Kurland) Ten Years to Doomsday (Pyramid Publications, 1964)
- The Butterfly Kid (Pyramid Books, 1967)
- (editor) Growing Up in Minnesota: Ten Writers Remember Their Childhoods (University of Minnesota Press, 1976) ISBN 978-0816607655
- (as John Valentine) Puppies (Entwhistle Books, 1979)
- Fox & Hare: The Story of a Friday Evening (Entwhistle Books, 1980) ISBN 9780960142897 — illustrated by Charles Marchant Stevenson
