= George Ferencz =

American theater director and producer (1947–2021)

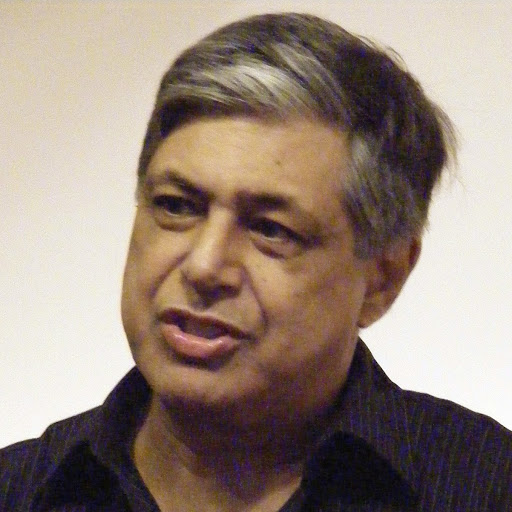
- Born: February 3, 1947; Cleveland, Ohio, U.S.
- Died: September 14, 2021 (aged 74); Brooklyn, New York, U.S.
- Occupation: Stage director

George Ferencz (February 3, 1947 – September 14, 2021) was an American theater director, producer, and teacher. A major name in American theater, he was renowned for his innovative stagings of plays and musicals by Sam Shepard, Eugene O'Neill, Amiri Baraka.

== Early life ==
Born in Cleveland, Ohio in February 1947, he was the son of George and Ann Ferencz, the eldest of six children. Wanting to pursue a career as a writer, he became editor of the school newspaper at Padua High, an all-boys school. The first in his family to graduate from college, Ferencz got his degree in theatre from Kent State University.

He moved to New York City in 1970 and began studying directing with Gene Frankel and then with Carl Weber. When Ferencz arrived in New York, he and his first wife, Pamela Mitchell, created the Yogi Bear and Huckleberry Hound Roadshow with Tim and Deirdre McDonald, in association with Scollon Productions. Ferencz wrote, directed, and produced the youth theater performances which ran tours of the eastern seaboard and Washington, D.C. area, culminating in a performance at The White House for Pat Nixon and the Children of The Foreign Diplomats. Ferencz garnered his first professional reviews when "The Huckleberry Hound All-Star Review" had a successful three week run at New York City's Beacon Theatre.

In the early 1970s, Ferencz directed productions of "Brecht on Brecht" for The All Angel's Players, NYC, Cry of Players (William Gibson), Incident at Vichy (Arthur Miller), Mister Roberts (Thomas Haggen) and Happy End (Bertolt Brecht) for the historic Amateur Comedy Club (in Sniffen Court since 1884), as well as a series of Agatha Christie mysteries for Narrows Community Theater, which Ferencz made popular when he adapted the mysteries to take place in the Bay Ridge community of Brooklyn. It was at this time he began to study with Gene Frankel and Carl Weber at The Gene Frankel Workshop located in the Mercer Arts Center. Frankel became an early mentor to Ferencz. "He taught me a director's arrogance: to say no, to say I know what is best for the production," he said of Frankel. At Mercer Arts, Ferencz directed a revival of Megan Terry's "Keep Tightly Closed in a Cool Dry Place." Ferencz was one of a handful of people who survived being inside the storied building on August 3, 1973, the day the Mercer Arts collapsed.

== Career ==
He first rose to fame with his productions of Eugene O’Neill’s The Hairy Ape (1976) and Dynamo (1976). He taught theater at Columbia University, Yale University and New York University, and co-founded the Impossible Ragtime Theater in 1975 with Pam Mitchell, Ted Story and Cynthia Crane. George Ferencz was also a co-founder of the Hispanic-American Music Theatre Lab (INTAR Theater) with musical director Tito Puente.

In the late 1970s, Ferencz worked as a performing artist as part of the Cultural Council Foundation CETA Artists Project in New York City. Ferencz was known for his extensive work with La MaMa Experimental Theatre Club where he was a resident director from 1982 to 2008. He directed 19 Shepard productions, including Shep’N’Rep (1979), Cowboy Mouth (1981), The Tooth of Crime (1983), and Shepard Sets (1984); the latter began Ferencz's collaborative partnership with drummer and composer Max Roach. Ferencz's other Off and Off-Off-Broadway credits included Paris Lights (1980), Battery (1981), Money: A Jazz Opera (1982), Harm's Way (1985), Welcome Back to Salamaca (1988), Conjur Woman by Beatrice Manley, and Prague, 1912 (2017).

Regionally, he worked with the San Diego Rep, Berkeley Repertory Theatre, Pittsburgh Public, The Cleveland Playhouse, Syracuse Stage, among others. A few of Ferencz's international credits included Percussion Summit (Verona, Italy, 1995) and The Lady Aoi (Munich, Germany, 2000).

== Death ==
Ferencz died following a long illness in Brooklyn, New York on September 14, 2021, at the age of 74. He was survived by his second wife, costume designer Sally Lesser, and his son, Jack.

== Bibliography ==
- John J. Winters, Sam Shepard A Life, Counterpoint, Berkeley, 2017 ISBN 978-1-61902-708-4
- David J. DeRose, Sam Shepard, Twayne Publishers, New York, 1992 ISBN 0-8057-3964-5
- Matthew Roudane, The Cambridge Companion to Sam Shepard, Cambridge University Press, New York, 2002 ISBN 0-521-77158-7
- Mel Gussow, Theatre on the Edge: New Visions, New Voices, Applause, New York, 1998 ISBN 1-55783-311-7
