= Paleface =

Paleface may refer to:

- An ethnic slur for white people
- The Paleface (1922 film), starring Buster Keaton
- The Paleface (1948 film), starring Bob Hope
- Paleface (Finnish musician) (born 1978), Finnish hip hop musician
- Paleface (musician), American singer, songwriter, musician, and artist
- Paleface attack, a popular chess opening
- Paleface River, Saint Louis County, Minnesota, United States
- Hibiscus denudatus, a plant known by the common name "paleface"
- Paleface Swiss, beatdown hardcore band from Switzerland
- Pale Face (film), 1985 film
