= Filthy Pedro =

Filthy Pedro is an antifolk musician based in London. Born Simon Parry in Anglesey, Wales, he moved to London in the late 1990s. Parry had grown interested in antifolk after hearing Beck's Stereopathetic Soulmanure album (1994). However, it was only after a trip to New York's Sidewalk Cafe (where Beck had first come to prominence) in 2001 that he thought a similar movement should be created in London.

Similar to Lach, the New York-based musician/promoter who first started booking 'antifolk' shows at various venues in New York City after finding himself unwelcome at more traditional venues, Parry founded a similar movement in London in 2002, taking the stagename Filthy Pedro. He created the antifolk.co.uk website and soon after started a seasonal gig in London -- 'The Antifolk UK Fest' -- where unusual and like-minded songwriters could perform outside of the generic indie/rock scene. The 'antifolk movement' and its unorthodox practices (often booking people on its shows with a low level of musical competence), started to attract some press attention in 2006, with Filthy Pedro a key interviewee.

The movement has been championed by Nude Magazine, Time Out London and Everett True of Plan B Magazine and The Village Voice. Filthy Pedro has appeared on Channel 4's Transmission programme (which borrowed the idea from his song 'Rock N Roll Points' as an interview technique), was recommended by Lauren Laverne in the NME and in 2007 performed live on Marc Riley's BBC6 radio show following the launch of his first single.

Filthy Pedro often performs with a band, The Carthaginians, which is composed of Thee Intolerable Kidd (Nathaniel Kidd), Claudius T. Skull (Tim Tomlinson), Cigarface (Jack Medley), Penny O, Krakatoa Kate, and Disco Stu (Stuart Saunderson of David Cronenberg's Wife). Many songs humorously combine themes of (usually ancient) history with more modern examples of heavy drinking, drugs and sex: "Man, I'm Old", "History Lover" and "Talking About Caesar".

== Singles ==
- "Rock N Roll Points" (Blang Records, 2007)
- "Gilgamesh" (Blang Records, 2010)
- "Get Your Beak On" (Blang Records, 2010)

== Albums ==
- Filthy Pedro and the Carthaginians (Blang Records, 2010)
