= Charles Marchant Stevenson =

American painter

- Born: August 29, 1927; Washington, D.C., U.S.
- Died: August 30, 2004 (aged 77); Mendocino, California. U.S.
- Education: Corcoran Academy of Fine Art; Pennsylvania Academy of the Fine Arts; University of Pennsylvania
- Known for: Painting, Illustration

Charles Marchant Stevenson (August 29, 1927 – August 30, 2004) was an American artist.

== Biography ==
=== Early life and education ===
Stevenson was born to Mildred and Charles Marchant Stevenson II in Washington, D.C. He spent his early years at his family home in Maryland.

He was awarded a scholarship to the adult school of the Corcoran Academy of Fine Art in Washington, D.C., which he attended from 1938 until 1945, when, immediately after his eighteenth birthday, Stevenson enlisted in the United States Navy. In the Navy, Stevenson worked on service publications, as an illustrator for All Hands and as art director for Naval Training and Training Bulletin.

After his tour of duty, Stevenson studied in Philadelphia, at the Pennsylvania Academy of the Fine Arts and the University of Pennsylvania.

Stevenson's early jobs included church window design at the Paine-Speyers stained glass company, work as an attendant and art therapist in a mental hospital, and as an advertising artist for several department stores.

=== Relocation to San Francisco ===
In 1954, Stevenson moved from the East Coast to San Francisco. There he worked for the advertising agency Wyatt & Welch for several years before leaving for free-lance work as a muralist and portrait painter. From 1957 to 1961, Stevenson ran Stevenson Graphics, a San Francisco advertising agency with ten commercial artists.

Examples of Stevenson's artwork from this period include Charles Marchant Stevenson: Self Portrait (1960) and The Goat Lady's House(1960), a painting of Lyford House, Richardson Bay Audubon Center & Sanctuary., built in the 1870s, now a Registered Historical Landmark, part of the Richardson Bay Audubon Center & Sanctuary and open to the public.

=== Relocation to Mendocino ===
Stevenson closed Stevenson Graphics in 1961 and left San Francisco for the village of Mendocino, California, which he made his home until his death. Of his radical change in location and lifestyle, Stevenson said, "Years ago a fortune teller told me that I had a chance to remake my entire life and I said, 'What I'd really like is to find someplace like Carmel or Monterey was when all the artists and writers were there,' and she said, 'Mendocino!'"

Just arrived in Mendocino, Stevenson phoned artist Dorr Bothwell who introduced him to Mendocino Art Center founders Bill and Jennie Zacha; that night the Zachas fed Stevenson dinner and rented him a studio behind their house. To earn money, at first Stevenson did architectural drafting for Bill Zacha, then worked part-time at several local restaurants.

=== Mendocino Art Center ===
Subsequently, Bill Zacha offered Stevenson a position teaching at the Mendocino Art Center, where Stevenson taught for almost forty years. In addition, Zacha represented Stevenson at Zacha's Bay Window Gallery.

Inspired by private schools of art on the East Coast, in the mid-1970s Stevenson created and was the first director of the Mastership Program at the Mendocino Art Center, an accredited alternative art school for children and teens. Instructors included James Maxwell (life drawing), Miriam Rice (sculpture), Ray Rice (murals and animation), Charles Stevenson (painting), and Bill Zacha (watercolor). Outside the classroom, Bill Zacha was the school's administrator and Dorr Bothwell acted as advisor.

The Stevenson Studio at the Mendocino Art Center was donated by Mildred and Charles Marchant Stevenson II, the artist's parents.

In 1976 Stevenson donated a large parcel of land to the Mendocino Art Center. Stevenson sold the property, located on Little Lake Street between School and Howard Streets, for one dollar, with the provision that it be used for affordable housing for artists. In 2006 the property was sold to a private developer for 1.2 million dollars.

=== Stevenson-Leach Studios ===
In 1989, Stevenson invited young Mendocino artist Matt Leach first to be his apprentice, then to work with him as a partner; they formed Stevenson/Leach Studios. Among the works produced by the team were a series of large painted screens, of which Mendocino Afterglow is a strong example. The Artist's Magazine awarded Mendocino Afterglow first place in its 1995 international landscape competition.

==== Theatre ====
Both Stevenson and Leach worked in local theatre, designing sets and posters for local productions, including productions at the Mendocino Art Center's Helen Schoeni Theatre, currently administered by the Mendocino Theatre Company, and the Gloriana Opera Company (now Gloriana Musical Theatre). Stevenson directed plays as well.

=== Final years ===
In Stevenson's later years, he and his friend, artist Pamela Hunter, held salons at Stevenson's house in the village of Mendocino — open gatherings of local artists, writers, and musicians, with art exhibits, poetry readings, and performances by local musicians.

After a long illness, Stevenson died at home the day after his 77th birthday, August 30, 2004.

== Art practice ==
=== Media ===
For his large work, Stevenson preferred acrylic paint, sometimes on canvas or canvas board, but more often on wood or masonite panels, which he prepared for painting with a ground of gessoed cheesecloth, a technique Stevenson developed painting for theatre. Referring to Stevenson's paintings, Maureen Eppstein wrote, "In some the richness of texture is enhanced by the surface under the paint, layers of gesso and loosely woven cheesecloth..." In addition to acrylics, Stevenson worked in serigraphy, watercolor, gouache and pen and ink drawing.

=== Portraits ===
Initially, Stevenson's work focused on his distinctive multiple-image portraits, for example Bata Bheag: Portrait of Irving S. Shapiro (1968), Mendocino Shepherd: Portrait of Thorkild Thompson (1967) and Dorr (1964), Stevenson's portrait of Dorr Bothwell at work in her Mendocino studio.

Although Stevenson always painted portraits, in the early 1970s he became more selective in accepting commissions and began to focus on other genres; his interests were wide and most are reflected in his subject matter.

=== Golden ratio and "Sparles" ===
Stevenson based his compositions on the golden ratio, first referred to by Leonardo da Vinci as the secto aurea (golden section). Leonardo's line drawings of the five Platonic solids illustrate Luca Pacioli's book La Divina Proportione (1509). One of Stevenson's reference books on the subject was Elements of Dynamic Symmetry by Jay Hambidge.

Stevenson's post-1961 work often included dynamic fractures inspired by Pythagoras' "theory of spiraling forms, serial dynamic symmetry" patterns which Stevenson said compose "the webwork of energy that extends everywhere.", illustrated in Apotheosis of the Working Man (1993), As I See It: Mendocino Bay (1995) and Stevenson's double portrait of jazz poet Ruth Weiss and artist Paul Blake, The Poet & The Artist (2002). Originally Stevenson called the star-like figures which emerged in spiraling fractures, "sparkles", but an interviewer's typo changed the word to "sparles" and Stevenson adopted it.

=== Liturgical work ===
Although Stevenson was eclectic in his personal spiritual exploration, with a special interest in Hermetic philosophy, some of Stevenson's Christian liturgical work can be seen at several Northern California churches. The stained glass angel windows at Saint Michael & All Angels Episcopal Church, Fort Bragg, California, were designed by Stevenson and installed in 1984. Other church installations include Stevenson's murals at the Methodist Church of the Good Shepherd (now Good Shepherd United Methodist Church), Richmond, California, and the Piedmont Community Church, Piedmont, California. In a rare foray into sculpture, Stevenson designed the altar cross for the children's chapel at the Piedmont Community Church.

=== Book illustration ===
Those who are familiar with the work of musician, writer and cultural icon Chester Anderson will recognize Charles Stevenson as the illustrator of Anderson's groundbreaking proto-graphic novel Fox & Hare: The Story of a Friday Evening (1980), published by Paul Williams' Entwhistle Books.

Lately I've Been Thinking (1990), one of the Mendocino Malady series by Bobby Markels, is illustrated on the cover and throughout the text with Stevenson's line drawings of the author.

Stevenson's painting The Hee Ancestor Landing on the Headlands appears on the cover of the Kelley House Museum publication Chinese of the Mendocino Coast, by Dorothy Bear and David Houghton.

== Exhibitions ==
A Charles M. Stevenson retrospective was held at the Mendocino Art Center in 1994.
