= Roger Manning =

American anti-folk musician

- Born: Springville, New York
- Origin: New York City
- Genres: Anti-folk
- Instrument: Acoustic guitar
- Years active: 1989 – present
- Labels: SST, Shimmy-Disc, Shanachie
- Website: rogerm.net

Roger Manning is a New York City based singer-songwriter who plays an aggressive acoustic style of music. Manning, along with a small handful of other artists, composed the original New York City anti-folk scene.

On February 6, 1985, Manning was cited by New York City's MTA police for "entertain[ing] passengers by singing, dancing or playing any musical instrument" on a subway platform. Manning mounted a legal challenge to the long-standing ban on busking and in September 1985, Judge Diane Lebedeff ruled in People v. Manning that busking was constitutionally protected. The ruling led to the establishment of the Music Under New York program.

In December 1988, SST Records released Manning's first self-titled album, which he supported with a tour of North America, crossing the United States two and a half times. In 1990, he hosted the first season of the short-lived syndicated radio program "Soho Natural Sessions."

Since 2001, Manning has made a living as a web designer in New York. In the mid-2000s, Manning was involved with Pacifica station WBAI in New York City, eventually joining the Pacifica National Board in 2004.

== Discography ==
- Roger Manning (1988), SST Records
- Missile Foundation (1989), 109 Records — as Joe Folk and the Soho Valley Boys
- Roger Manning (1992), Shimmy Disc
- Short, Sharp, Shook (1992) — "Lefty Bootlegs and Demos: Music, Words and Sounds"
- Roger Manning (1995), Moll-Selekta (Germany); (1997), Shanachie Records (U.S.)
- Chyeah (1998) — as Joe Folk and the Soho Valley Boys
- Roger Manning (2014), Roger Records
- Roger Manning (2015), Roger Records — "make-under" version of Roger Manning (1988)
