= Cynthia Crane =

American jazz musician

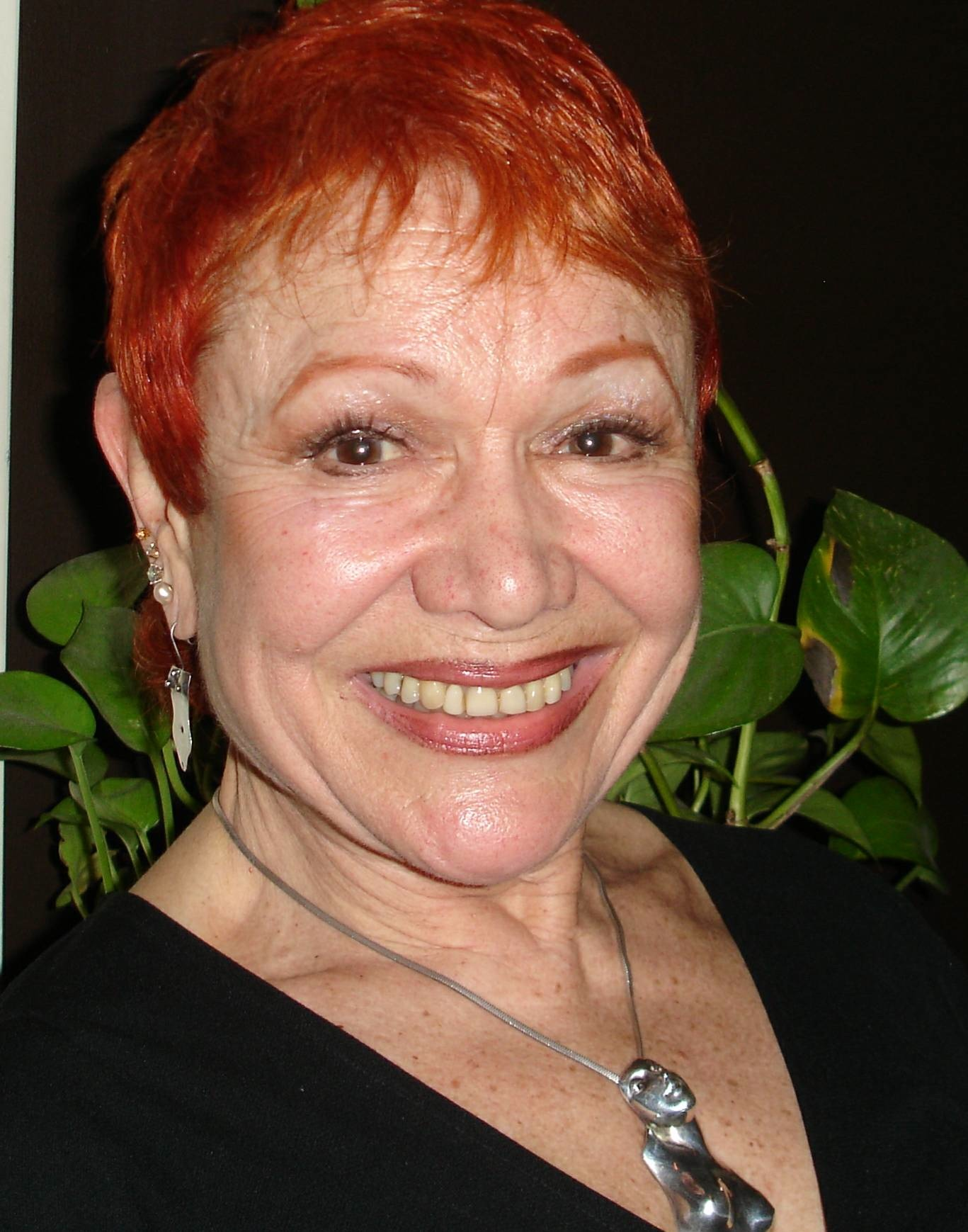
Cynthia Crane (2009).

Cynthia Crane (born 1936) is a New York City-born and based jazz and cabaret singer who has performed locally and in Paris L'Express (Paris) for over 50 years. She co-founded and co-produced the IRT, Impossible Ragtime Theater, in NYC's flower district with partners Ted Story, George Ferencz and Pam Mitchell. She has been reviewed by The New York Times, Jazz Now, Jazz Times, Daily Variety and Time Out New York. John S. Wilson, in The New York Times, called her "Polished and compelling." In 2009 she became a victim in the Bernard Madoff financial fraud scheme and was forced to sell her 1855 Greenwich Village Brownstone and 1909 Steinway grand piano as a result.
