= Washington Squares =

The Washington Squares
- The Washington Squares. Left to right: Tom Goodkind, Lauren Agnelli, Billy Ficca, Bruce Paskow. Photographed at Cambridge Folk Festival, Cambridge, England, by Dudley Snodgrass, Esq.

Background information
- Origin: Greenwich Village, NY, U.S.
- Genres: Folk; Pop; Alternative rock
- Years active: 1983–1991
- Labels: Gold Castle Records; PolyGram

The Washington Squares were a neo-beatnik folk revival music group. Modeled after early 1960s groups like The Kingston Trio and Peter, Paul and Mary, the group was named after New York City's Washington Square Park, emblematic of Greenwich Village. The group, consisting of Bruce Jay Paskow, Tom Goodkind, and Lauren Agnelli, came up with their name over free drinks provided by Agnelli, who was a waitress at a Mickey Ruskin's Chinese Chance off Washington Square Park where Goodkind and Paskow were regulars.

Paskow, Goodkind, and Agnelli dressed, played, and sang in a style evocative of the idealistic, left-leaning folk revival groups of the Kennedy era, but added a layer of post-punk Reagan-era irony. Paskow had previously played in the punk band The Invaders; Agnelli had been in the Nervus Rex and a writer for the Village Voice; Goodkind, the band's leader, had knocked around in U.S. Ape and was best known as creator and manager of large alternative music venues in Manhattan such as Irving Plaza, the Peppermint Lounge, and Roseland.

The revivalist concept preceded any real familiarity with this genre of music: to put together their repertoire, the band bought a bunch of records, picked the brains of veteran folksingers, and pooled their money to send Goodkind to Washington, D.C. to do research on folk songs at the Library of Congress.

They followed the Kingston Trio in covering "Greenback Dollar" and Peter, Paul and Mary in the traditional folk song, "Samson and Delilah", and also performed many other traditional folk songs including a bittersweet Polish song associated with the union Solidarity. Many of their own original songs were powerfully political, albeit tempered; for example, "You Can't Kill Me" alludes to the assassination of gay San Francisco politician Harvey Milk with its line "Assassinated in Frisco for a straight man's crime".

The band released two records while active; The Washington Squares and Fair and Square. Their first was recorded at Electric Lady Studios in New York City, and was produced by Mitch Easter, best known for his work with R.E.M. Their second was produced by Steve Soles, noted for his work with Bob Dylan on the Rolling Thunder Revue, and as a member of the Alpha Band with T-Bone Burnett. Three more albums of previously unreleased recordings are in the planning with the first due Thanksgiving 2016.

The group broke up after Paskow's death in 1994. They reunited for one more concert at New York City's The Bottom Line, hosted by K-Rock's Vin Scelsa, where Tom played Tom Paxton's "Rambling Boy" to his old friend Bruce in tribute. The New York Dolls' David Johansen, the Patti Smith Group's Lenny Kaye, and Marshall Crenshaw joined the Squares (with Joey Ramone, of the Ramones, from the audience) for the reunion.

Agnelli has continued to perform on and off (she sings on some of Brave Combo's albums). Goodkind left the music business for some years, re-emerging as the conductor and arranger for the TriBattery Pops Tom Goodkind Conductor, an orchestra of volunteers who live near the World Trade Center site. He is also a voting member of his local community board in lower Manhattan. The group reunited in 2018 at a sold out City Winery show with Peter Yarrow bringing Tom Goodkind to lead guitar and banjo with Billy Ficca on drums and Mike Fornatale on bass and vocals joining Tom and Lauren. Goodkind died of 9/11 related cancer in February 2019 at the age of 65.

== Recordings ==
- The Washington Squares (1987)
- Fair and Square (1989)
- From Greenwich Village, the Complete Washington Squares (1997)
- Monsters of Folk Vol. 1 Sessions 1983 - 1985 (2016)
- Folk Riot Vol. 2 Sessions 1985 - 1987 (2018)
- Folk Riot Vol. 3 Sessions 1987 - 1990 (2020)
- Folk Riot Vol. 4 Sessions 2018 - Live at the City Winery - Video (2018)
