= Cindy Lee Berryhill =

American singer-songwriter

- Born: June 12, 1965 (age 61); Silver Lake, Los Angeles, California, United States
- Genres: Anti-folk
- Occupation: Singer-songwriter
- Years active: Mid 1980s–present
- Labels: Rhino,Cargo,RoughTrade,etc
- Website: www.cindyleeberryhill.com

Cindy Lee Berryhill (born June 12, 1965) is an American singer-songwriter and guitarist, a co-founder of the New York Antifolk movement, who has recorded multiple albums, college radio hit singles, and compilations over the years. She was inducted into the San Diego Music Hall of Fame in 2024.

== Early life and education ==
Berryhill was born in Silver Lake, Los Angeles, California and grew up in various parts of California. She began playing the guitar at the age of ten, and wrote her first two songs at that time, which then led to her love of songwriting.

== Career ==
Berryhill's debut album Who's Gonna Save The World? (Rhino/Capitol) came out in October 1987 and was followed by the Lenny Kaye-produced Naked Movie Star (Rhino/WEA) in 1989. In AllMusic's online Cindy Lee Berryhill Biography entry (2008), Richie Unterberger wrote, "The San Diegan's 1987 debut, Who's Gonna Save the World?, may be her best simply because it is her most straightforward. Then as now, she was most effective, ironically, at her most basic and serious." By contrast, Stewart Mason in his four-and-a-half-star review of her third album, calls it her "first completely solid and intriguing effort".

Berryhill, like Brenda Kahn, Paleface, Beck, Michelle Shocked and John S. Hall, was an early proponent of the New York City Anti-folk movement. She is featured in the documentary Mariposa: Under a Stormy Sky along with Emmylou Harris, The Violent Femmes, Daniel Lanois and others.

It would be another six years before her third album Garage Orchestra (Cargo/Earth) would be released. Garage Orchestra was a Tin Pan Alley-inflected departure from her earlier folkier albums and garnered a four-star review in Rolling Stone.

In 1995 her boyfriend and husband-to-be, rock writer Paul Williams, suffered a brain injury in a bicycle accident, and Berryhill put off the making of her next album until 1996's Straight Outta Marysville.

In 1999, Berryhill's novel, Memoirs of A Female Messiah, was released along with a live album entitled Living Room 16. After the birth of Berryhill and Williams's son in 2001, she began a song cycle that included the song "Beloved Stranger", that was inspired by her experiences with her husband's brain injury and the awareness that many soldiers were coming home from war with similar injuries. In 2008, the album Beloved Stranger (Populuxe) was released.

Her seventh album, The Adventurist was released on March 10, 2017, on Omnivore Records. On November 8, 2024, Berryhill was inducted into the San Diego Music Hall of Fame.

== Personal life ==
Berryhill's second cousin was the surfboard shaper Dale Velzy (his mother was a Berryhill) and her first cousin is Damon Berryhill, who was a major league baseball player.

In 1997, Berryhill and rock music journalist Paul Williams were married. Williams began to develop early-onset dementia as a result of his bicycle accident, which ultimately led to his requiring full-time care in 2009. Williams died on March 27, 2013, after spending several years in an Encinitas nursing home.

Berryhill currently lives in Encinitas, California, with their son, Alexander Berryhill-Williams.

== Partial discography ==
All US releases unless otherwise noted.

=== Albums ===
- Who’s Gonna Save The World (Rhino, 1987) also released by: Spain / Sam Records, Germany / Zensor Records and England / New Routes Records
- Naked Movie Star (Rhino, 1989) also released by: Germany, Greece and Italy, all on Rhino Records, England / Awareness Records
- Garage Orchestra (Cargo, 1994) also released in England by Unique Gravity
- Straight Outta Marysville (Cargo, 1996) also released in England by Demon Records
- Living Room 16 (Griffith Park Records – GPR001, 1999) live
- Beloved Stranger (Populuxe, 2008)
- The Adventurist (Omnivore, 2017)

=== Singles and EPs ===
- "Indirectly Yours" / "She Had Everything" (Indisc Beneluxe, 1989) Belgium only 7" & CD
- "Me, Steve, Kirk And Keith" / "Indirectly Yours" (Awareness, 1989) England only 7" & 12"
- "Me, Steve, Kirk And Keith" / "Baby Should I Have The Baby" (EMI/Rhino RPS 30, 1989) Australia promo only 7"
- "Baby Should I Have The Baby" / "Supernatural Fact" (Rhino, 1989) Promo only CD single
- "High Jump" / "Baby Should I Have The Baby" / "Weeping Descent of Sleep" (Cargo-Earth Music 014, 1994) CDEP
- "Woke Up From A Dream" / "Emperor: Little Boots" (Omnivore Recordings, 2020) download only with booklet

=== Compilations ===
- Fast Folk Musical Magazine Vol. 2, No. 8 (FFMM, 1985) includes: "Steve On H"
- The Best Of The Radio Tokyo Tapes (Chameleon, 1987) includes: "Headin' For The Borderline"
- CMJ Presents Certain Damage! - Volume 3 (CMJ, 1987) includes: "She Had Everything"
- Don't Read While You Listen! (Rhino, 1988) includes: "She Had Everything", "Damn, I Wish I Was A Man", "Spe-c-i-al Ingredient"
- Broome Closet Anti-Folk Sessions (109 Records, 1989) includes: "Every Home Has A Setting Sun", "Take A Giant Step"
- Acoustic Variations (Orphan, 1993) includes: "Father of the Seventh Son"
- The 4th Annual San Diego Music Awards (SLAAM, 1994) includes: "Every Someone Tonight"
- Tales From The Rhino (Rhino, 1994) includes: "She Had Everything"
- Cargo Records 1995 Fall Sampler (Cargo, 1995) includes: "Gary Handeman"
- SXSW Live Vol.3 (SXSW, 1995) includes: "I Wonder Why"
- Doin' It Right (Demon, 1996) England only - includes: "Diane"
- Future Folklore, Volume 1 (B.A.M., authorized free cassette distribution 1997) includes April 18, 1997, live recordings of: "Damn I Wish I Was A Man", "Riddle Riddle", "She Won't Even Try", "Scariest Thing In The World", "Antarctica", "Family Tree"
- Future Folklore, Volume 2 (B.A.M., authorized free cassette distribution 1997) includes April 18, 1997, live recordings of: "Diane", "Jane And John", "Memoirs Of A Female Messiah"(reading), "California", "Aquamarine", "Radio Astronomy"
- Ocean – A Celebration Of San Diego Women’s Music (SLAAM, 1998) includes: "High Jump"
- Future Folklore, Volume 3 (B.A.M., authorized free cassette distribution 1998) includes November 29, 1997, live recordings of: "Aquamarine", "UFO Suite", "God Bless The Living Room Tour"
- Drinking From Puddles: A Radio History (Kill Rock Stars, 1999) includes: "Aquamarine"
- San Francisco Song Cycle Vol 1 (2000) includes: "The Skip Song"
- Music Is Love (Route 61 Music, 2012) includes: "It Doesn't Matter" (Manassas / Stephen Stills cover)
