= Anti-folk =

Music genre

- Other names: Antifolk
- Stylistic origins: Contemporary folk; punk rock
- Cultural origins: Mid-1980s, United States

Other topics
- Folk punk; freak folk; indie folk; neofolk; free folk

Anti-folk (sometimes spelled antifolk) is a genre of folk music that emerged in the 1980s in New York City. It was founded by singer-songwriter Lach, as a response to the prevailing folk music scene. It is characterized by its amateur sound, DIY ethos, and often humorous, rebellious, or satirical lyrics. Antifolk music was made to diverge from, and sometimes mock, the perceived seriousness of the era's mainstream music scene, while often still being protest music aimed at social change. The latter element especially overlaps with folk punk.

== History ==
=== In the United States ===
Antifolk began as Lach's response to being barred from Greenwich Village folk clubs such as Folk City and The Speakeasy because his music crossed folk with punk. In the early 1980s, singer-songwriter Lach started The Fort, an after-hours club on NYC's Rivington Street on the Lower East Side. The Fort's opening coincided with the New York Folk Festival. Because of this, Lach dubbed his event the New York Antifolk Festival. Other early proponents of the movement included the Washington Squares, Cindy Lee Berryhill, Brenda Kahn, Paleface, Beck, Hamell on Trial, Michelle Shocked, Zane Campbell, John S. Hall, Roger Manning, Kirk Kelly. The original Fort was shut down in 1985 by the police, and because of this the club moved locations several times, including East Village bars Sophie's and Chameleon, before settling in the back room of the SideWalk Cafe starting in 1993. The New York Antifolk Festival was held annually at the SideWalk Cafe until its closure in 2019 (long outlasting the original Folk Festival). Events have also taken place in the band shells in Tompkins Square Park and Central Park. While living in San Francisco in the early 1990s, Lach helped establish a West Coast anti-folk movement at the Sacred Grounds Coffee House.

Other artists to have achieved a notable level of success who have been considered anti-folk include Jeffrey Lewis, Regina Spektor and the Moldy Peaches.

=== In Britain ===
In the 2000s the term was adopted in Britain, particularly in the London underground scene, with acts including David Cronenberg's Wife and The Bobby McGee's. The UK antifolk scene, largely centred in London and Brighton, has established its own identity, which was written about in a six-page feature in the September 2007 issue of Plan B magazine. In 2004 the lo-fi musician Filthy Pedro started seasonal anti-folk festivals, which he promoted with Tom Mayne of the band David Cronenberg's Wife. An anti-folk scene in Brighton, curated primarily by Mertle, was quick to follow that of London.

Other key figures within the UK anti-folk community include Dan Treacy of Television Personalities, Jack Hayter, Milk Kan, Extradition Order, Benjamin Shaw, Lucy Joplin, Candythief, JJ Crash, Larry Pickleman and Paul Hawkins. Emmy the Great and Laura Marling were added to the roster of antifolk artists as they play antifolk music with mocking lyrics. Kate Nash started her music career playing anti-folk-style shows, including a concert promoted by Larry Pickleman and Mertle in Brighton.

Dan Willson, who performs under the name Withered Hand, is an Edinburgh-based musician often considered part of the genre. His first studio album, Good News, was released in 2009.

Welsh antifolk artist Mr Duke has gained some popularity in Wales, and Crywank, an antifolk project from Manchester, surfaced in 2009.

== See also ==
- Anticomp Folkilation
- Psychedelic folk
