= Legally Blonde (disambiguation) =

Legally Blonde may refer to:

- Legally Blonde, 2001 film
  - Legally Blonde (soundtrack)
- Legally Blonde (novel) by Amanda Brown, upon which the 2001 film was based
- Legally Blonde 2: Red, White & Blonde, 2003 sequel to Legally Blonde
- Legally Blondes, 2009 version of Legally Blonde
- Legally Blonde (musical), 2007 stage musical
- Legally Blonde (2003 film), a 2003 TV film starring Jennifer Hall
- Legally Blonde: The Musical – The Search for Elle Woods, 2008 reality show to cast the lead role of Elle Woods for Legally Blonde: The Musical
- Legally Blonde (franchise)
