= Legally Blonde (franchise) =

Media franchise

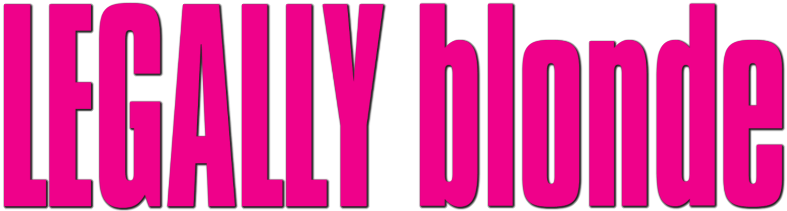
- Official franchise logo
- Created by: Amanda Brown
- Original work: Legally Blonde by Amanda Brown
- Owner: Metro-Goldwyn-Mayer (Amazon MGM Studios)
- Years: 2001–present

Print publications
- Novels: Legally Blonde (2001); Blonde at Heart (2006); Beach Blonde (2006); Vote Blonde (2006); Blonde Love (2006)

Films and television
- Films: Legally Blonde (2001); Legally Blonde 2: Red, White & Blonde (2003)
- Television series: Legally Blonde (pilot, 2003); Elle (2026–present)
- Television film: Legally Blonde: The Musical (2007)
- Direct-to-video: Legally Blondes (2009)

Theatrical presentations
- Musical: Legally Blonde

Audio
- Soundtracks: Legally Blonde (2001); Legally Blonde 2: Red, White & Blonde (2003); Legally Blonde - Original Broadway Cast Recording (2007); Legally Blonde - Original London Cast Recording (2010)

Miscellaneous
- Reality television: Legally Blonde: The Musical: The Search for Elle Woods (2008)

Legally Blonde (stylized as LEGALLY blonde) is an American media franchise based on Amanda Brown's 2001 novel of the same name, and owned by Amazon MGM Studios through Metro-Goldwyn-Mayer. It mainly follows the comical adventures of Elle Woods, a blonde who transforms from a sorority girl focused on a future with her boyfriend to a successful student at Harvard Law School.

The franchise includes two theatrical films, a direct-to-video spin-off, and a prequel television series. It also spawned a young adult novels series, and a stage musical adaptation, which in turn, spawned a reality competition television series, and a filmed stage production. Collectively, the first two films have grossed $267.1 million worldwide.

== Origin ==
The franchise is based on the 2001 novel. Elle Woods, a blonde California University of Los Angeles sorority president & homecoming queen, is deeply in love with her college sweetheart, Warner Huntington III. When Warner enrolls in Harvard Law School & aims to find a girl more serious than Elle to be his wife, Elle schemes a plan to follow him there to win him back.

== Films ==
Film	U.S.release date	Director	Screenwriter(s)	Story by	Producers
Legally Blonde	July 13, 2001	Robert Luketic	Kirsten Smith & Karen McCullah Lutz	Kirsten Smith & Karen McCullah Lutz	Marc Platt & Ric Kidney
Legally Blonde 2: Red, White & Blonde	July 2, 2003	Charles Herman-Wurmfeld	Kate Kondell	Eve Ahlert, Dennis Drake & Kate Kondell	Marc Platt, David Nicksay, Jennifer Simpson & Stephen Traxler
Legally Blondes	April 28, 2009	Savage Steve Holland	Chad Gomez Creasey & Dara Resnik Creasey	Chad Gomez Creasey & Dara Resnik Creasey	Marc Platt, Reese Witherspoon, Sean McNamara, Jennifer Simpson, Sara Berrisford, David Brookwell, Hudson Hickman, David Buelow & David Grace

=== Legally Blonde (2001) ===
Former Sorority President Elle Woods is happy and in love with her boyfriend. She wants nothing more than to be married, and become Mrs. Warner Huntington III. Huntington, however will not propose stating that she is "too blonde". Determined to win him over, and prove to herself that there's more to her than her looks, Elle rallies all of her resources and applies for the law program at Harvard University.

=== Legally Blonde 2: Red, White & Blonde (2003) ===
Elle travels to Washington, D.C., determined to present her stance for animal rights. Ignored by every one she encounters, she learns that the Capitol can be more difficult to navigate than The Ivy League university law school from which she attained her J.D. degree. After befriending, and gaining the sympathy of a Massachusetts congresswoman named Victoria Rudd, Elle attains the chance of getting to present her arguments. To make a difference, she must convince the Legislature to take her seriously.

=== Legally Blondes (2009) ===
With Elle Woods away as a successful lobbyist in Washington D.C., her two younger British cousins Annabelle "Annie" Woods and Isabelle "Izzy" Woods (played by Camilla and Rebecca Rosso) move to California to live in her home. The pair learn that they will be attending the Pacific Preparatory School and they upset the dominant social set of their fashion tastes and personalities.

This third film is a spin-off, and was originally intended as the pilot film of a cancelled television series. Legally Blondes was released as a direct-to-video on April 28, 2009, and later aired on ABC Family on August 2, 2009.

=== Future ===
==== Untitled fourth film ====
In June 2018, Reese Witherspoon entered negotiations with Metro-Goldwyn-Mayer to produce and star in a fourth installment in the Legally Blonde franchise, which would be a direct sequel to the first two films. Karen McCullah Lutz and Kirsten Smith were hired as co-screenwriters. MGM later confirmed in a Twitter post that Legally Blonde 3 was set to be released on May 8, 2020, though it did not meet this date. In May 2020, it was announced that Mindy Kaling and Dan Goor would write an entirely new script for the film.

== Television series ==
Series	Season	Episodes	First released	Last released	Showrunner(s)	Network(s)	Status
Elle	1	8	July 1, 2026	July 1, 2026	Laura Kittrell and Caroline Dries	Amazon Prime Video	Renewed

=== Unaired pilot (2003) ===
Originally filmed as the pilot episode of a cancelled television series, Legally Blonde aired through private viewing television in 2003. Jennifer Hall stars as Elle Woods, with the series intended to adapt the many misadventures she encountered as a former-sorority sister at Harvard University. The network executives ultimately passed on ordering a season for the series. In 2017, the pilot was released on YouTube, and was received with negative reviews.

=== Elle (2026–present) ===
In April 2023, it was announced that after acquiring MGM, Amazon had plans to expand the franchise with a television series in development.

On May 14, 2024, Amazon Prime Video announced a prequel series, Elle. In a statement, Reese Witherspoon, who hosted the announcement, said that viewers "will get to know how Elle Woods navigated her world as a teenager with her distinct personality and ingenuity, in ways that only our beloved Elle could do."

Witherspoon said she was inspired to create the spinoff series after watching Netflix's Wednesday starring Jenna Ortega. "I saw that Wednesday Addams show and I was like, 'Oh, she was in high school.' I loved it. I watched every episode. I thought it was amazing," Witherspoon said. "And I was like, 'We should do Elle Woods in high school because I wanted to see who she was before college, before law school. And I started having all these ideas and these amazing writers came up with a great pitch and now Amazon is making the show and it’s called Elle."

== Television films ==
Film	U.S. release date	Director(s)	Screenwriter(s)	Story by	Producers
Legally Blonde: The Musical	October 13, 2007	Beth McCarthy-Miller & Jerry Mitchell	Heather Hach	Heather Hach	Marta Ravin

=== Legally Blonde: The Musical (2007) ===
Three performances of the Broadway musical were filmed and aired on MTV in 2007. The filmed stage production was co-directed by Beth McCarthy-Miller and Jerry Mitchell, from a script by Heather Hach, with music and lyrics were co-written by Laurence O'Keefe and Nell Benjamin.

== Recurring cast and characters ==
List indicators
- A dark gray cell indicates that the character was not in the film or that the character's presence in the film has yet to be announced.
- An ^{A} indicates an appearance through archival footage or stills.
- A ^{C} indicates a cameo role.
- A ^{U} indicates an uncredited role.
- A ^{P} indicates a photographic role.

Character	Films			Television series	Pilot	Television film
Character	Legally Blonde	Legally Blonde 2: Red, White & Blonde	Legally Blondes	Elle	Legally Blonde	Legally Blonde: The Musical
Character	2001	2003	2009	2026–present	2003	2007
Elle Woods	Reese Witherspoon	Reese Witherspoon	Reese Witherspoon^{A}^{P}	Lexi Minetree	Jennifer Hall	Laura Bell Bundy
Bruiser Woods	Moonie	Moonie		Dog name unknown	Various dogs	Various dogs
Paulette Bonafonté	Jennifer Coolidge	Jennifer Coolidge				Orfeh
Emmett Richmond	Luke Wilson	Luke Wilson				Christian Borle
Margot Chapman	Jessica Cauffiel	Jessica Cauffiel				Annaleigh Ashford
Serena McGuire	Alanna Ubach	Alanna Ubach				Tracy Jai Edwards
UPS Guy	Bruce Thomas	Bruce Thomas				Andy Karl
Eva Woods	Tane McClure			June Diane Raphael		Gaelen Gilliland
Wyatt Woods	James Read			Tom Everett Scott		Kevin Pariseau
Vivian Kensington	Selma Blair					Kate Shindle
Warner Huntington III	Matthew Davis					Richard H. Blake
Professor Callahan	Victor Garber					Michael Rupert
Brooke Taylor-Windham	Ali Larter					Nikki Snelson
Chutney Windham	Linda Cardellini					Kate Wetherhead
Dewey Newcombe	John Kapelos^{U}					Andy Karl
Enid Wexler	Meredith Scott Lynn					Natalie Joy Johnson
Niko Salvatore	Greg Serano					Manuel Herrera
Chuck / Carlos	Jason Christopher					Matthew Risch
Judge Marina R. Bickford	Francesca P. Roberts					Amber Efé
DA Joyce Riley	Shannon O'Hurley					Michelle Kittrell
Arrogant Aaron	Kelly Nyks					Noah Weisberg

== Additional crew and production details ==
Film	Crew/detail						
Film	Composer(s)	Cinematographer(s)	Editor(s)	Production companies	Distributing companies	Running time	
Film	Legally Blonde	Rolfe Kent	Anthony B. Richmond	Anita Brandt-Burgoyne	Metro-Goldwyn-Mayer; Marc Platt Productions	MGM Distribution Co. (U.S); 20th Century Fox (International)	96 minutes
Legally Blonde 2: Red, White & Blonde	Elliot Davis	Rolfe Kent	Peter Teschner	Metro-Goldwyn-Mayer; Marc Platt Productions; Type A Films	95 minutes	MGM Distribution Co. (U.S); 20th Century Fox (International)	
Legally Blondes	John Coda	Bill Barber	Cindy Parisotto; Anthony Markward	Metro-Goldwyn-Mayer; Marc Platt Productions; Type A Films	20th Century Fox Home Entertainment	82 minutes	
Legally Blonde: The Musical	Nell Benjamin; Laurence O'Keefe	—N/a	Christine Mitsogiorgakis	MGM Television; MGM On Stage; MTV Productions	MTV	123 minutes	
Elle (TV series)	Tom Howe	Tobias Datum; Shasta Spahn	Various	Caroline Dries Entertainment; Meridian & Bigbee Productions; Reunion Pacific Entertainment; Hello Sunshine; Amazon MGM Studios	Amazon Prime Video	43–56 minutes (per episodes)	

== Other media ==
=== Novels series ===
The franchise was based on Amanda Brown's 2001 novel of the same title.

A young adult novels series titled Elle Woods and featuring a teenage Elle Woods during her high school years was written by Natalie Standiford. All published by Little, Brown and Company, the four novels were released in 2006.

=== Stage adaptation ===
A musical debuted in 2007, with music and lyrics by Laurence O'Keefe and Nell Benjamin and book by Heather Hach. It premiered in pre-Broadway tryouts in San Francisco, California. In April 2007 the show moved to Broadway, opening to mixed reviews. Jerry Mitchell directed and choreographed. The original cast starred Laura Bell Bundy as Elle, Christian Borle as Emmett and Richard H. Blake as Warner. It received seven Tony nominations and ten Drama Desk nominations but did not win any.

=== Reality television series ===
A reality competition television series in conjunction with the musical titled Legally Blonde: The Musical: The Search for Elle Woods debuted on MTV in 2008. The show debuted on June 2, 2008 as a competition show, where the winner would be cast in the lead role. Bailey Hanks ultimately won, and in addition to being cast in the starring role, was given the opportunity to record her own single of the musical's first-act number titled, "So Much Better". The show concluded on July 21, 2008. Autumn Hurlbert was the runner up. She served as Hanks' understudy and performed in the ensemble of the show. Bundy's last performance in the musical was on July 20, 2008. Hanks began performances on July 23, 2008 and remained with the show until it closed on October 19, 2008.

== Reception ==
=== Box office and financial performance ===
Film	Box office gross			Box office ranking		Budget	Worldwide Total income	Ref.
Film	North America	Other territories	Worldwide	All-time North America	All-time worldwide	Budget	Worldwide Total income	Ref.
Legally Blonde	$96,493,426	$45,315,809	$141,809,235	#786	#1,872	$18,000,000	$123,809,235	
Legally Blonde 2: Red, White & Blonde	$90,639,088	$34,700,000	$125,339,088	#843	#2,221	$45,000,000	$80,339,088	

=== Critical response ===
Title	Rotten Tomatoes	Metacritic	CinemaScore
Legally Blonde (2001)	71% (150 reviews)	59 (32 reviews)	A−
Legally Blonde 2: Red, White & Blonde (2003)	37% (156 reviews)	47 (39 reviews)	B
Elle (TV series)	53% (43 reviews)	52 (19 reviews)	
