= Heather Hach =

American screenwriter, librettist and novelist

- Education: University of Colorado at Boulder
- Occupations: Screenwriter, librettist, novelist
- Spouse: Jason Hearne (m. 2003)
- Children: 2
- Writing career
- Period: 2003–present
- Notable awards: Laurence Olivier Award for Best New Musical

Heather Hach is an American screenwriter, librettist, and novelist.

== Early life ==
Hach graduated from the University of Colorado at Boulder School of Journalism, and later worked as a research assistant at The New York Times Denver bureau and as a magazine editor at Sports and Fitness Publishing.

== Career ==
A 1999 recipient of the Walt Disney Screenwriting Fellowship, Hach wrote the screenplay for the 2003 remake Freaky Friday with Leslie Dixon, and both were nominated for a Saturn Award for Best Screenplay for the film.

Hach wrote the libretto for the 2007 musical Legally Blonde, based on the Amanda Brown novel of the same name and the film of the same name (both 2001), and was subsequently nominated for a Tony Award for Best Book of a Musical and a Drama Desk Award for Outstanding Musical. Legally Blonde also won the Laurence Olivier Award for Best New Musical. In 2008 Hach participated as a judge on the MTV television series Legally Blonde: The Musical – The Search for Elle Woods, created to find a replacement for the lead actress then appearing in the musical on Broadway.

Hach is the co-author (with Mary Rodgers) of Freaky Monday, a novel which was released by HarperCollins on May 5, 2009. She wrote the screenplay for What to Expect When You're Expecting.

== Personal life ==
Hach married Jason Hearne on December 23, 2003.
