= Elle Woods =

Fictional character in the "Legally Blonde" franchise

- Legally Blonde character
- Reese Witherspoon as Woods in Legally Blonde
- First appearance: Legally Blonde (2001)
- Last appearance: Elle (2026–present)
- Created by: Amanda Brown
- Portrayed by: Reese Witherspoon (2001–2003); Laura Bell Bundy (musical; 2007–2008); Lexi Minetree (2026–present)

In-universe information
- Gender: Female
- Occupation: Lawyer
- Family: Wyatt Woods (father); Eva Woods (mother); Annabelle Woods (cousin); Isabelle Woods (cousin); Bruiser Woods (dog)
- Spouse: Emmett Richmond (husband)
- Significant other: Warner Huntington III (ex-boyfriend)
- Nationality: American

Elle Woods is a fictional character from the Legally Blonde franchise, created by Amanda Brown in her 2001 novel of the same name. Woods is known for her blonde hair and bubbly personality, and was received by many audiences as an inspiring character and "feminist icon".

The character was portrayed by Reese Witherspoon in the 2001 film adaptation, which follows Woods' transformation from a sorority girl focused on a future with her boyfriend, Warner Huntington III, to a successful student at Harvard Law School. Witherspoon later reprised the role in the sequel film Legally Blonde 2: Red, White & Blonde (2003). A younger version of the character was portrayed by Lexi Minetree in the prequel television series Elle (2026). Woods is also the protagonist in the 2007 stage musical adaptation of the first film, a role originated by Laura Bell Bundy and later portrayed by various actresses over time.

== Film Series ==
=== Summary ===
Elle Woods is a sorority sister living at the Delta Nu House at a university in Los Angeles (USC in the novel, the fictional California University Los Angeles (CULA) in the film, and UCLA in the musical) where she studies in Fashion Merchandising and maintains a 4.0 GPA. Woods' boyfriend, Warner Huntington III, the son of a U.S. congressman, breaks up with her the night she expects him to propose, claiming that he needs "to marry a Jackie, not a Marilyn." Warner is bound for Harvard Law School, and Woods becomes determined to gain admittance to the school to win him back. Once at Harvard, Woods learns that Warner has a new fiancée, Vivian Kensington. Woods quickly finds that she is less prepared than the other students at Harvard and becomes determined to prove herself academically. She is able to gain access to a murder case that her professor is working on and finds that the defendant is an alum of her former sorority. Woods forms a bond with her former sorority sister, Brooke Taylor-Windham, and is able to exonerate her. She grows romantically close with Emmett Richmond, another law student, who helps her through her academic and personal journey. In the film's conclusion, Woods gives the commencement address to the law school class after proving herself and earning the respect of her peers. This moment highlights her academic and personal triumphs, showcasing her character development.

In the sequel to the original film, Elle is in the middle of planning her wedding while in line for a promotion at work. She decides to track down the birth mother of her beloved dog, Bruiser, and discovers that she is being used for animal testing. After getting fired for trying to bring up the testing facility, Elle goes to work on Capitol Hill, seeking to advance animal rights. She begins the film with naïve expectations about the motivations of members of Congress. Although these expectations are dashed, she perseveres and succeeds in the passage of the desired animal rights legislation. At the end of the movie, she marries Emmett in Washington, D.C., and is seen looking at the White House when Emmett asks her where she wants to live.

In the spin-off film, Legally Blondes, Elle is an unseen character to her two younger cousins, Izzy and Annie Woods.

=== Creation ===
In the early days of the 2001 film's casting, Witherspoon spent multiple weeks in a sorority house to assist her in bringing Elle Woods to life. In those days, she found that sorority girls were highly misunderstood and often reduced to their appearances, later contributing to her agenda to surprise audiences with Woods.

=== Characterization ===
Amanda Brown crafted Elle Woods to embody the positivity and charisma that accompany blonde hair. She identified "true blondes" as radiating an "inner light of buoyant, charmed confidence." Accordingly, Woods is most known for her pink, dressy outfits, and shiny blonde hair. Her personality uniquely blends confidence, cluelessness, wit, and perseverance. She is full of energy and determination, both of which aid her in her success in law school.

=== Reception ===
Entertainment Weekly put Reese Witherspoon's portrayal of Woods on its end-of-the-decade "best-of" list, saying, "She's blonde, bubbly and carries a tiny Chihuahua. But despite the inevitable Paris Hilton comparisons, Reese Witherspoon's Legally Blonde dynamo managed to be taken seriously. Case closed!" Additionally, The New York Times praises Woods' wits and charisma, suggesting that Legally Blonde intentionally pokes fun at the blonde stereotype: "Elle – not to mention Ms. Witherspoon – is smarter than the movie, which doesn't quite know what to do with her, mocking her ditzy rich-girl cluelessness at one moment and admiring her moxie the next."

Some critics highlight Woods' impact on female audiences. The ABA Journal deems Woods a feminist icon and inspiring role model for generations: "Years later, Elle remains influential for women entering the legal profession and women lawyers alike." However, others argue that the portrayal of Woods has the complete opposite effect. The Pittsburgh Post-Gazette contends that the Legally Blonde sequel undermines female empowerment, describing it as a "retreat-quel" showcasing the "dumbing back down of Elle Woods."

=== Feminist interpretation ===
Since Witherspoon's portrayal of Woods in Legally Blonde, audiences have perceived Woods' story as a role model for women who desire to be both pretty and career-driven. The Birmingham Post review of the film argues that Elle exemplifies strength in being both light-hearted and serious, challenging traditional stereotypes of women. The film highlights Elle's prideful femininity as an asset to her legal expertise, which is demonstrated by Woods winning the legal case through her knowledge of hair care. The Salisbury University Literature and Film Quarterly contends that Woods' ability to use her femininity to recognize key evidence highlights the overlooked intelligence of women in male-dominated fields.

== Television ==
In 2024, Amazon Prime Video confirmed a prequel series to Legally Blonde titled Elle would premier later in 2026. It would focus on Elle as a high school student in the 1990s. The show is produced by Reese Witherspoon and the "Hello Sunshine" production company.

== Stage musical adaptation ==
Woods has been portrayed by eleven different actresses in different stagings of Legally Blonde – The Musical: Gabby Cinque, Olivia Mezzerina, Bailey Hanks, Sayaka Kanda, Barbara Obermeier and in the West End by Sheridan Smith (who was later replaced by her Legally Blonde co-star Susan McFadden). From July 2011, Carley Stenson took over the role of Elle Woods with Susan McFadden leaving the show.

production	Actress	Image
Original Broadway cast	Laura Bell Bundy	
Original First U.S. tour cast	Becky Gulsvig	
Original Second National U.S. tour cast (Non-Equity Tour Cast)	Nikki Bohne	
Original West End cast	Sheridan Smith/Susan McFadden/Carley Stenson	
Original UK tour cast	Faye Brookes	
2nd UK Tour cast	Lucie Jones	
Netherlands	Kim-Lian	
Germany	Barbara Obermeier	
South Korea	Jessica Jung/Luna Park/Jung Eun-ji	
West End revival	Courtney Bowman	
Singapore	Nathania Ong	
3rd UK tour cast	Amber Davies	

== Other adaptations ==
Woods is also the basis of a series of young adult fiction novels by Natalie Standiford. The character is mentioned but not seen in the 2009 direct-to-video sequel, Legally Blondes, which portrays the adventures of her twin British cousins. In 2018, Ariana Grande referenced Woods in several scenes of her "Thank U, Next" music video.
