= The Ugly Truth =

2009 film by Robert Luketic

- Theatrical release poster
- Directed by: Robert Luketic
- Screenplay by: Nicole Eastman; Karen McCullah Lutz; Kirsten Smith
- Story by: Nicole Eastman
- Produced by: Tom Rosenberg; Gary Lucchesi; Steven Reuther; Kimberly di Bonaventura; Deborah Jelin Newmyer
- Starring: Katherine Heigl; Gerard Butler; Eric Winter; John Michael Higgins; Nick Searcy; Kevin Connolly; Cheryl Hines
- Cinematography: Russell Carpenter
- Edited by: Lisa Zeno Churgin
- Music by: Aaron Zigman
- Production companies: Columbia Pictures; Relativity Media; Lakeshore Entertainment
- Distributed by: Sony Pictures Releasing
- Release date: July 24, 2009
- Running time: 96 minutes
- Country: United States
- Language: English
- Budget: $38 million
- Box office: $205 million

The Ugly Truth is a 2009 American romantic comedy film directed by Robert Luketic, written by Nicole Eastman, Karen McCullah Lutz and Kirsten Smith, and starring Katherine Heigl and Gerard Butler.

Polar opposites, producer Abby Richter and sexist TV presenter Mike Chadway must work together on his misogynistic morning show segment on modern relationships, resulting in unexpected chemistry between them.

The film was released in North America on July 24, 2009, by Columbia Pictures, and was panned by critics, with the Rotten Tomatoes' critical consensus stating that "despite the best efforts of Butler and Heigl", the film "suffers from a weak script that relies on romantic comedy formula". It was a commercial success, grossing $205 million against a budget of $38 million.

== Plot ==
Abby Richter is a morning show television producer in Sacramento, California who believes in true love and is a big supporter of self-help books. Coming home from a disastrous date, she sees a local television show, The Ugly Truth, featuring Mike Chadway, whose cynicism about relationships prompts Abby to call in to argue with him on-air. The next day, she discovers that the television station threatens to cancel her show because of poor ratings. So, the station owner has hired Mike to do a segment on her show.

At first, the two have a rocky relationship; Abby thinks Mike is crass and disgusting while he finds her naive and a control freak. Nevertheless, when she meets the man of her dreams, a doctor named Colin, Mike convinces her that by following his advice, she will improve her chances with him. They make a deal: If Mike's management of her courtship results in her landing Colin, she will work peacefully with him, but if Mike fails, he leaves her show.

Mike improves the show's ratings, brings married co-anchors Georgia and Larry closer, and successfully instructs Abby to be precisely what Colin would want through many pointers, including: always laughing at his jokes and saying he is amazing in bed. Mike is invited to appear on The Late Late Show with Craig Ferguson and is offered a job at another network. Abby is forced to cancel a romantic weekend with Colin, during which they had planned to finally sleep together, and instead fly to Los Angeles to persuade Mike to stay with her show.

Mike admits he does not want to move because he wants to stay near his sister and nephew in Sacramento. In the hotel elevator, they passionately kiss but go to their separate rooms. Mike, dealing with the intensity of his feelings for Abby, visits her room only to find Colin has shown up to surprise her, so Mike leaves. Abby realizes that Colin only likes the woman she has been pretending to be, not the real her, and breaks up with him.

Mike takes a job with a rival television station in Sacramento and does a broadcast at the same hot air balloon festival as Abby. He cannot resist intruding when she kicks the new "Mike Chadway" imitator off the air and begins ranting about what cowardly weaklings men are. The balloon takes off with them aboard while they argue. Abby says she broke up with Colin, and Mike admits he loves her. Abby kisses him while they fly off, all broadcast due to a camera mounted in the balloon. The film ends with Abby and Mike in bed. When Mike asks if she was faking it, Abby responds, "You'll never know."

== Cast ==
- Katherine Heigl as Abby Richter, a romantically challenged morning show producer.
- Gerard Butler as Mike Chadway, her male chauvinist correspondent.
- Eric Winter as Colin Anderson, an orthopedic surgeon who lives across from Abby. In the alternate ending, he was in a relationship with Joy.
- John Michael Higgins as Larry Freeman, co-anchor of the morning show, married to Georgia.
- Bree Turner as Joy Haim, assistant and friend to Abby who is also love starved and lives vicariously through Abby. In the alternate ending she is shown to be in a relationship with Colin.
- Nick Searcy as Stuart, Abby and Mike's Boss
- Kevin Connolly as Jim Ryan, a blind date.
- Cheryl Hines as Georgia Bordeney, co-anchor of the morning show, married to Larry.
- Bonnie Somerville as Elizabeth Chadway, Mike's sister.
- Nate Corddry as Josh
- Noah Matthews as Jonah
- Yvette Nicole Brown as Dori Coleman
- Blake Robbins as KPQU Big Wig
- Allen Maldonado as Duane
- Craig Ferguson as Himself

== Production ==
The film was made by the producers of Legally Blonde and written by Nicole Eastman, Karen McCullah, and Kirsten Smith. Eastman wrote the original script, which then stayed in development for about a decade before McMullah and Smith performed a rewrite.

The Mike Chadway character is allegedly based on and inspired by Adam Carolla. Gerard Butler sat in on The Adam Carolla Show, observing only, in order to prepare for his role.

=== Filming locations ===
The film was, for the most part, filmed on location in California, including Sacramento, Los Angeles, and San Pedro, Los Angeles and Temecula. The montage sequence toward the end of the film includes the Foresthill Bridge near Auburn.

== Release ==
=== Box office ===
The film opened to third place at the box office—behind Harry Potter and the Half-Blood Prince (in its second weekend) and the newly released G-Force—with $27,605,576 and the highest per-screen average in the top 10. As of July 2, 2018, the film has grossed $88.9 million at the North American domestic box office and $116.3 million internationally for a worldwide total of $205.2 million, becoming Katherine Heigl's second-best grossing film behind Knocked Up.

In Great Britain and Ireland, the film topped the box office and took in £1.9 million in its opening weekend, fighting off competition from G.I. Joe: The Rise of Cobra, which entered at number two with £1.7 million.

=== Critical reception ===
The review-aggregation website Rotten Tomatoes gives The Ugly Truth a score of 14% based on 174 reviews, and a weighted average of 3.80/10. The website's consensus reads, "Despite the best efforts of Heigl and Butler, The Ugly Truth suffers from a weak script that relies on romantic comedy formula, with little charm or comedic payoff." Metacritic, which uses a weighted average, assigned the film a score of 28 out of 100, based on 31 critics, indicating "generally unfavorable" reviews. Moviegoers, unlike many critics, thought much higher of the film. Audiences polled by CinemaScore gave the film an average grade of "A−" on an A+ to F scale.

Rolling Stone critic Peter Travers gave the film a half star out of four, stating: "There's not a genuine laugh in it [...] Toss this ugly-ass crap to the curb, along with the other multiplex garbage, and see a romance that gets it right. I'm talking (500) Days of Summer." Time named it one of the top 10 worst chick flicks. The A.V. Club gave the film a D.

Roger Ebert of the Chicago Sun-Times gave the film two out of four stars, saying that Heigl and Butler were "pleasant" but "the movie does them in." He commented on the restaurant scene that also was a red-band clip on YouTube, saying that "Heigl makes a real effort" but that Meg Ryan's scene in When Harry Met Sally... (1989) was the gold standard "in this rare but never boring category". As for portraying the morning news realistically, he says "the film makes Anchorman: The Legend of Ron Burgundy look like a documentary".

Ruth McCann of The Washington Post called the film "indulgently glossy, refreshingly snarky and legitimately sexy". Kara Nesvig of the Star Tribune said "the dialogue is snappy and sexy, Heigl and Butler spar with zingy chemistry, and though the ending is as predictable as you'd assume, it's a sexy sort of popcorn flick". Nesvig praises Heigl saying the film "adds up to more than the sum of its clichés".

== Home media ==
The Ugly Truth was released on DVD and Blu-ray on November 10, 2009, by Sony Pictures Home Entertainment.
