= Becky Gulsvig =

American stage actress

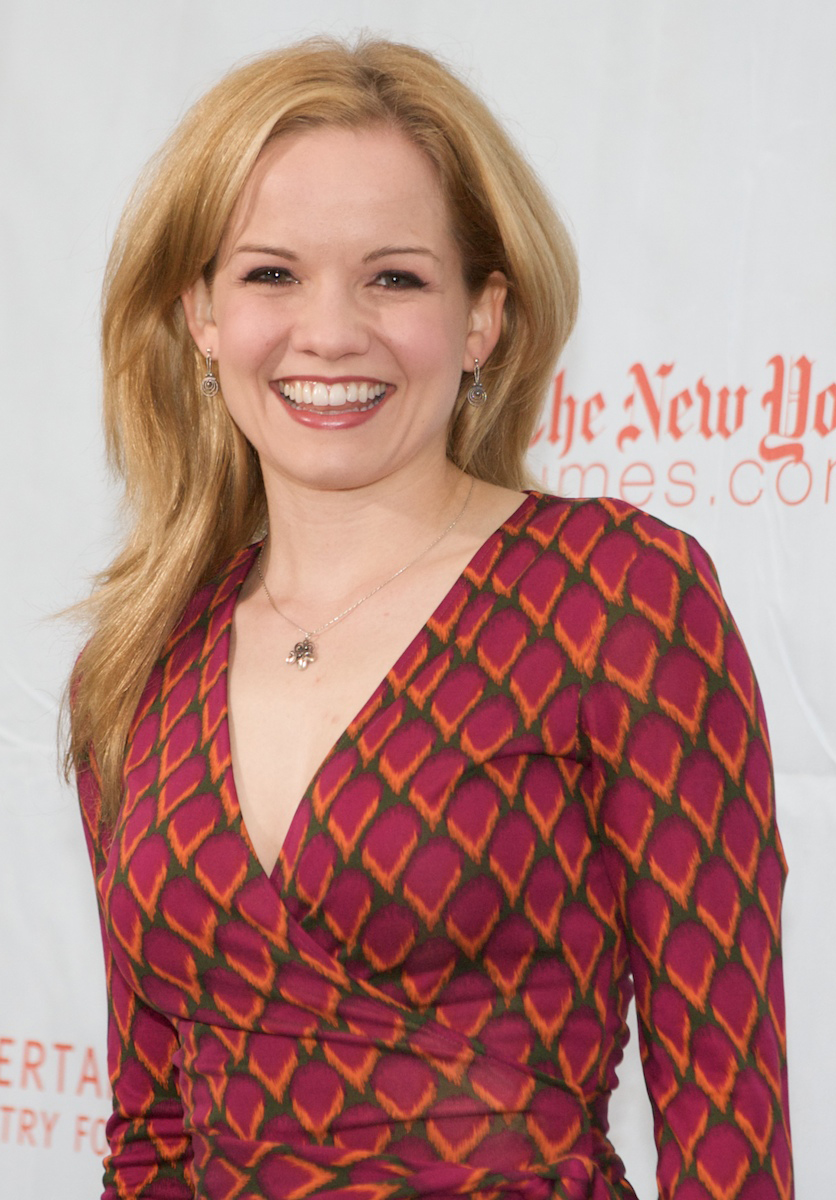
- at the Revlon Run/Walk for Cancer (2008)
- Born: Rebecca Lynn Gulsvig; August 25, 1982 (age 43); Moorhead, Minnesota, U.S.
- Occupation: Actress
- Spouse: Tyler Fisher (m. 2006)
- Children: 1
- Website: beckygulsvig.com

Rebecca Lynn Gulsvig (born August 25, 1982) is an American stage actress.

== Early life ==
Gulsvig was born in Moorhead, Minnesota, the daughter of Patricia Kay (née Nelson) and Kristofer Gulsvig. She is of Norwegian heritage. Her mother is a teacher and her father is a financial advisor.

Gulsvig's first stage performance was at age 10 in a local theater production of Annie, playing the titular character. She attended Moorhead High School, Trollwood Performing Arts School, and the Red River Dance and Performing Company.

== Career ==
At 17, following high school graduation, Gulsvig moved to New York City where her first role was as Wendy in a touring production of Peter Pan. She has performed on Broadway in Hairspray as Amber Von Tussle and originated the role of Leilani in the Broadway production of Legally Blonde, understudying the roles of Elle Woods, Serena, and Margot. She can also be seen on a Verizon commercial. She starred as Elle Woods in the North American national tour of Legally Blonde the Musical when the tour started in September 2008, until it ended in August 2010. For this role she was nominated for the 2009 Helen Hayes Award for Outstanding Lead Actress in a Non-Resident Production. Gulsvig performed the song "So Much Better" live at the 2009 Tony Awards ceremony.

In 2015, Gulsvig played Cynthia Weil in the U.S. national tour of Beautiful: The Carole King Musical. On October 10, 2016, Gulsvig returned to Broadway in School of Rock in the role of Patty.

Beginning October 2018, Gulsvig played Beverley Bass in the national tour of Come from Away through mid-2019. In October 2019, it was announced that she would be succeeding Jenn Colella, who originated the role, in the Broadway company starting November 12, 2019. It was announced on January 22, 2020, that Gulsvig would play her final performance in the role on March 1 and would be replaced by Rachel Tucker.

== Personal life ==
In 2006, Gulsvig married Tyler Fisher, whom she met while working on a cruise ship, and have one daughter together, Hazel. Her friend is Laura Dandurand.

== Stage appearances ==
Year	Title	Role	Notes	Ref.
2001	Baby Case	Ensemble	Arden Theatre Company	
2002	Hairspray	u/s for Amber Von Tussle and Lou Ann	Broadway	
2003	Grease	Patty Simcox	Paper Mill Playhouse	
2006	Broadway Close Up	Performer	Concert at Merkin Concert Hall	
2007	Legally Blonde	Leilani; u/s for Elle Woods, Margot, and Serena	Broadway	
2008–2010	Legally Blonde	Elle Woods	U.S. National Tour	
2013	Les Misérables	Eponine	Riverside Theatre	
2014–2015	Disenchanted	Cinderella	Theater at St. Clements	
2015	Disenchanted	Cinderella	Off-Broadway: Westside Theatre	
2015	Beautiful: The Carole King Musical	Cynthia Weil	U.S. National Tour	
2016	School of Rock	Patty	Broadway	
2018	South Pacific	Ensign Nellie Forbush	Cape Playhouse	
2018	Come from Away	Beverley and others	U.S. National Tour	
2019	Come from Away	Beverley and others	Broadway	
