= Nikki Bohne =

American singer, actress, and dancer

- Born: Nicole Christine Bohne; 1987 (age 38–39); California
- Education: Brigham Young University (BFA)
- Occupations: Stage actress, singer, dancer
- Website: https://www.nikkibohne.com

Nicole "Nikki" Christine Bohne (pronounced Bonnie, born 1987) is an American singer, stage actress, and dancer.

== Education and career ==
A former Young Ambassador, Bohne graduated with honors from Brigham Young University in 2010 with a BFA in Music/Dance/Theater. After graduation, she moved to New York City and was hired weeks later to star as the lead character of Elle Woods in the national tour of Legally Blonde.

Bohne was cast in the national tour of Bring It On: The Musical, which opened on October 30 in Los Angeles, California. The show then transferred to Broadway for an August 1 opening date in 2012 where Bohne remained the cover for the four lead women: Campbell, Eva, Skylar and Kylar. She took over for the role of "Eva" for a time toward the end of run.

Bohne also spent time working as a singer at Tokyo Disney.

On December 16, 2013, Bohne joined the first national tour of the musical Wicked in the ensemble and as an understudy for the role of Glinda.

== Personal life ==
Bohne is a member of the Church of Jesus Christ of Latter-day Saints.

While touring with Wicked through Omaha, Nebraska, Bohne met her husband, Trent Lloyd. They now reside in Southern California with their kids, Theodore James Lloyd, Charlie Lloyd, and Emma Lynn Lloyd Bohne now teaches vocal lessons to aspiring singers in California.
