= Legally Blonde 2: Red, White & Blonde =

2003 film by Charles Herman-Wurmfeld

- Theatrical release poster
- Directed by: Charles Herman-Wurmfeld
- Screenplay by: Kate Kondell
- Based on: Characters by Amanda Brown
- Produced by: David Nicksay; Marc E. Platt; Jennifer Simpson; Stephen Traxler
- Starring: Reese Witherspoon; Sally Field; Regina King; Jennifer Coolidge; Bruce McGill; Bob Newhart; Luke Wilson
- Cinematography: Elliot Davis
- Edited by: Peter Teschner
- Music by: Rolfe Kent
- Production companies: Metro-Goldwyn-Mayer Pictures; Type A Films; Marc Platt Productions
- Distributed by: MGM Distribution Co. (United States and Canada); 20th Century Fox (International)
- Release date: July 2, 2003
- Running time: 95 minutes
- Country: United States
- Language: English
- Budget: $25-45 million
- Box office: $125.3 million

Legally Blonde 2: Red, White & Blonde (also referred to simply as Legally Blonde 2) is a 2003 American comedy film directed by Charles Herman-Wurmfeld and written by Kate Kondell. It is a sequel to the 2001 film Legally Blonde and the second installment in the Legally Blonde franchise. It stars Reese Witherspoon, who reprises her role from the first film, alongside an ensemble cast featuring Sally Field, Regina King, Jennifer Coolidge, Bruce McGill, Dana Ivey, Mary Lynn Rajskub, Bob Newhart, Luke Wilson, and Bruce Thomas, with Coolidge, Wilson, and Thomas also reprising their roles.

Although the story is set in Washington, D.C., the film was shot in the offices at the Delta Center and the Utah State Capitol in Salt Lake City, Utah, and the Illinois State Capitol in Springfield, Illinois. The aerial views of Washington buildings were scale models built by the crew.

The film opened on July 2, 2003 receiving mixed reviews from critics, and grossed $125.3 million worldwide. It was followed by a direct-to-video spin-off, Legally Blondes, released in 2009, while a direct sequel is in development.

== Plot ==
After graduating from Harvard Law School, (Note: As depicted in Legally Blonde (2001)) Elle Woods wants her Chihuahua, Bruiser, to reunite with his mother, hoping both dogs will attend her wedding to Emmett. Elle hires a detective to find Bruiser's mother, only to discover that her owner is C'est Magnifique, a cosmetics company that uses Bruiser's mother for testing. Discovering that her law firm represents the corporation, she urges the firm to drop them as a client, but is dismissed and then the firm fires Elle.

Elle decides to leave Boston for Washington, D.C., to work on Bruiser's Bill. She takes it upon herself to be the "voice for those who can't speak" and to outlaw animal testing. While working for Congresswoman Victoria Rudd, Elle is met with skepticism and other barriers common to Washington politics.

Rudd's member of staff Timothy sarcastically calls her "Capitol Barbie". After various ups and downs, including a failed attempt to improve her work environment by having her co-workers write compliments about one another and place them in the "snap cup", Elle starts to lose faith in Washington politics.

Elle discovers that Bruiser is gay and has been affectionate with Leslie, a Rottweiller owned by Congressman Stan Marks, the chairman of the Committee on Energy and Commerce which has jurisdiction over Bruiser's Bill. Elle also finds that Congresswoman Libby Hauser, the Ranking Member of the same committee, was a member of Elle's sorority Delta Nu. Marks and Hauser therefore warm to Elle, eventually supporting Bruiser's Bill.

Elle discovers that Rudd has been working against her, trying to satisfy the interests of a significant campaign donor named Bob. Rudd is blackmailed into supporting Elle's petition by her chief of staff Grace Rossiter. She has a recorded conversation during which Rudd admits to Elle that she has been working against Bruiser's Bill to help her sponsors, who want to continue testing on animals.

As Grace is appalled that Rudd lied to Elle and blamed it on her, she and Elle eventually reach a place of mutual respect. Grace admits she came to D.C., with an enthusiasm not unlike Elle's, but later lost that idealism when she discovered how dirty politics could be.

With the help of her friends, Elle's discharge petition is booming, and Bruiser's Bill is brought to the floor of the House. C'est Magnifique Corporation releases Bruiser's mother and the rest of the dogs.

Elle and Emmett are married in a park in D.C., not at Fenway Park as planned, but standing on Fenway's home plate delivered to D.C. by Paulette's husband. Emmett asks Elle where she wants to live since they are now a married couple, and she suggests the cities of Boston, Beverly Hills, and D.C. As they pass the White House, Elle winks at the audience, hinting at a possible presidential run.

== Cast ==
- Reese Witherspoon as Elle Woods Richmond
- Moonie as Bruiser Woods
- Sally Field as Victoria Rudd
- Regina King as Grace Rossiter
- Jennifer Coolidge as Paulette Bonafonté
- Luke Wilson as Emmett Richmond
- Bob Newhart as Sid Post
- Bruce McGill as Stan Marks
- Dana Ivey as Libby Hauser
- Jessica Cauffiel as Margot Chapman
- Alanna Ubach as Serena McGuire
- Gidget as Bruiser's Mom
- Bruce Thomas as UPS Guy
- Mary Lynn Rajskub as Reena Giuliani
- J. Barton as Timothy McGinn
- Sam Pancake as Kevin
- Octavia Spencer as Security Guard
- Nicole Bilderback as Congresswoman

== Production ==
Although the story is set in Washington, D.C., the film was shot in the offices at the Delta Center and the Utah State Capitol in Salt Lake City, Utah, and the Illinois State Capitol in Springfield, Illinois. The aerial views of Washington buildings were scale models built by the crew.

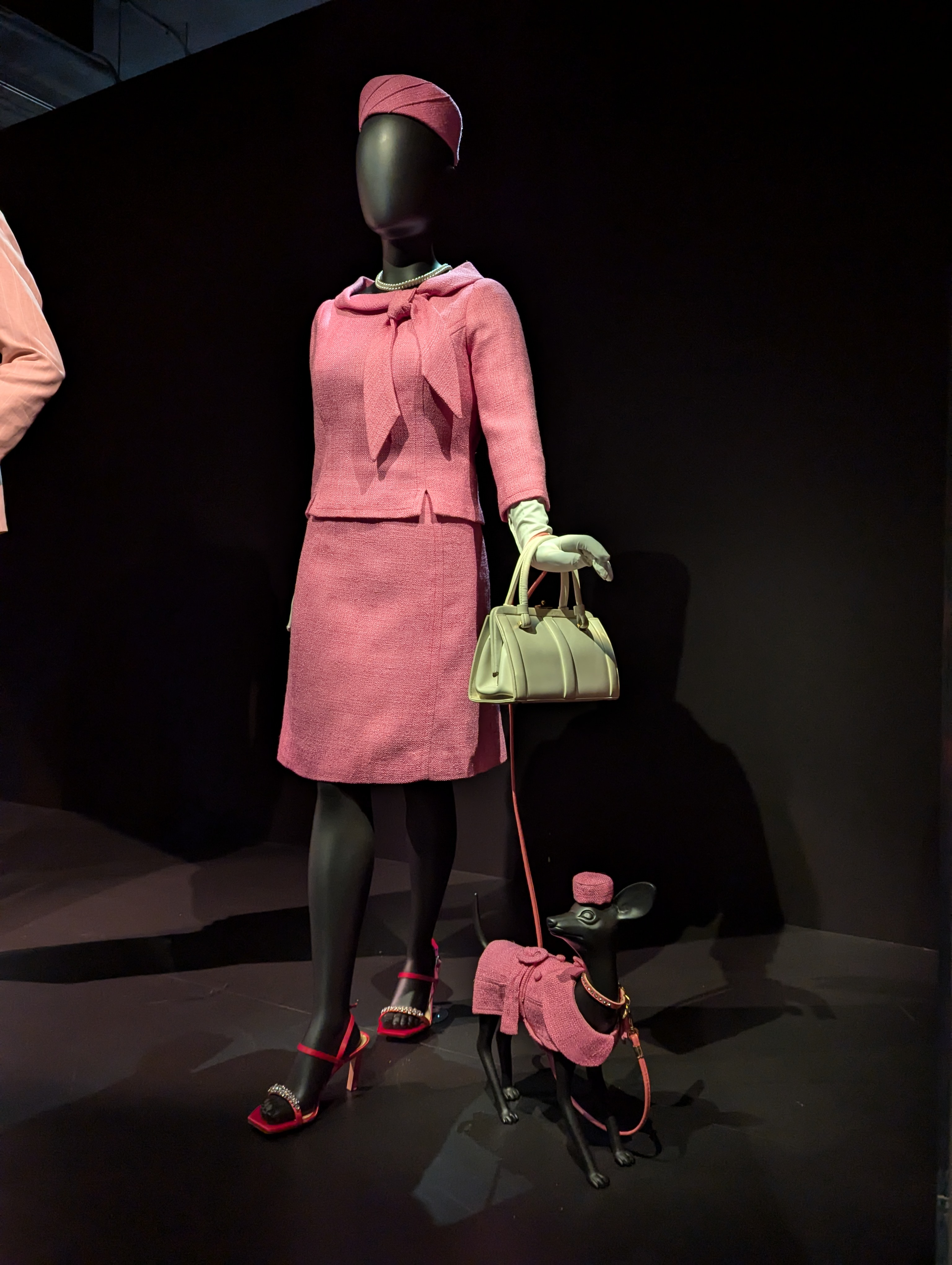
Costumes worn by Elle and Bruiser Woods on display at the Academy Museum in Los Angeles, California.

== Reception ==
=== Critical response ===
On review aggregator Rotten Tomatoes, the film has an approval rating of 35% based on 157 reviews, with an average rating of 5/10. The site's critical consensus states: "This blonde joke is less funny the second time around." On Metacritic, it has a weighted average score of 47 based on 39 critics, indicating "mixed or average" reviews. Audiences surveyed by CinemaScore gave the film a grade of "B" on scale of A+ to F. In a 2 out of 4 review, Terry Lawson of Detroit Free Press stated that "while Legally Blonde 2 is bearable in a way that busier and more ambitious unfunny recent comedies like Hollywood Homicide and Alex and Emma are not, it has almost none of the ditsy charm of the original." Entertainment Weekly ranked it at number 21 on their list of "Top 25 Worst Sequels Ever Made" (2006).

=== Box office ===
The film grossed a total of $125 million worldwide. Legally Blonde 2: Red, White & Blonde hit theaters on Wednesday July 2, before the Fourth of July in 2003 and grossed nearly $40 million by Monday. The following weekend ticket sales were half of that, and the film quickly left theaters in the coming weeks. Grossing about $90 million in the U.S., the film was a success for the studio, though many expected it to perform just as well as Witherspoon's last big film, Sweet Home Alabama.

== Home media ==
The film was released on DVD and VHS on November 4, 2003. The video sold 2 million copies earning a profit of over $35.4 million. The film was released on Blu-ray on March 29, 2011.

== Soundtrack ==
Legally Blonde 2: Red, White & Blonde – Motion Picture Soundtrack

Soundtrack album by various artists
- Released: July 1, 2003
- Genres: Pop; pop rock; R&B; alternative rock
- Label: Curb
- Producers: Anita Camarata; Antonina Armato; Dann Huff; Kaylin Frank; Michael Patterson; Nic Jodoin; Timothy James

Singles from Legally Blonde 2: Red, White & Blonde – Motion Picture Soundtrack
- 1. "We Can" Released: June 16, 2003

Professional ratings
Review scores
Source	Rating
Allmusic	3/5 stars

A soundtrack for the film was released on July 1, 2003, by Curb Records. "We Can" was released as a single for the soundtrack by American country music recording artist LeAnn Rimes on June 16, 2003, by Curb Records.

Track listing
No.	Title	Recording artist(s)	Length
1.	"We Can"	LeAnn Rimes	3:40
2.	"Breakthrough"	Hope 7	2:45
3.	"Atomic Dog" (Dogs of the World Unite Remix)	George Clinton (featuring Coolio)	4:23
4.	"Me Against the World"	Superchick	2:58
5.	"I'm Just a Bill"	Deluxx Folk Implosion	3:26
6.	"Sisters Are Doin' It for Themselves"	Eurythmics and Aretha Franklin	4:53
7.	"More Bounce (In California)"	Soul Kid #1	3:59
8.	"For What It's Worth"	Candyskins	4:00
9.	"Power to the People"	John Lennon	3:21
10.	"America"	Lou Reed	2:49
11.	"We Can" (American Mix)	LeAnn Rimes	3:36

== Sequel ==
In June 2018, Reese Witherspoon entered negotiations with Metro-Goldwyn-Mayer to produce and star in a third installment in the Legally Blonde film series. Karen McCullah Lutz and Kirsten Smith were hired as co-screenwriters. MGM later confirmed that Legally Blonde 3 was set to be released on May 8, 2020, though it did not meet this date. In May 2020, it was announced that Mindy Kaling and Dan Goor would write an entirely new script for the film.
