= Legally Blonde (musical) =

2007 musical

- Original Broadway production
- Music: Nell Benjamin; Laurence O'Keefe
- Lyrics: Nell Benjamin; Laurence O'Keefe
- Book: Heather Hach
- Basis: Legally Blonde by Amanda Brown; Legally Blonde by Karen McCullah Lutz and Kirsten Smith
- Premiere: January 23, 2007: Golden Gate Theatre, San Francisco
- Productions: 2007 San Francisco; 2007 Broadway; 2010 West End; Various international/regional productions and tours; 2027 West End
- Awards: Laurence Olivier Award for Best New Musical; Helpmann Award for Best Musical

Legally Blonde is a 2007 musical with music and lyrics by Laurence O'Keefe and Nell Benjamin and a book by Heather Hach. It is based on the novel Legally Blonde by Amanda Brown and the 2001 film of the same name.

The show tells the story of Elle Woods, a sorority girl who enrolls at Harvard Law School to win back her ex-boyfriend Warner. She discovers how her knowledge of the law can help others, and she successfully defends exercise queen Brooke Wyndham in a murder trial. Throughout the show, very few characters have faith in Elle, with the exception of her aesthetician Paulette, but she manages to surprise them when she defies expectations while staying true to herself.

Legally Blonde premiered in pre-Broadway tryouts in San Francisco, California. In April 2007 the show moved to Broadway, opening to mixed reviews and disappointing sales. Jerry Mitchell directed and choreographed. The original cast starred Laura Bell Bundy as Elle, Christian Borle as Emmett, and Richard H. Blake as Warner. It received seven Tony nominations and ten Drama Desk nominations but did not win any. The West End production opened in January 2010 at the Savoy Theatre. The West End production was nominated for five Laurence Olivier Awards and won three, including the Best New Musical award.

The musical was recorded in September 2007 and aired on MTV in October 2007. Following this, a reality television program aired showing the audition process for the next person to play Elle Woods on Broadway. The winner was Bailey Hanks, who played the role from July 23, 2008, until the production closed on October 19, 2008.

== Synopsis ==
=== Act one ===
The members of UCLA's sorority Delta Nu congratulate their president, Elle Woods; Elle is expecting her boyfriend, Warner Huntington III, to propose marriage to her later that night. Led by Margot, Serena, and Pilar, the girls help Elle find the perfect dress for the occasion ("Omigod You Guys"). However, when Elle goes on her dinner date with Warner, he tells her that he needs to date someone more "serious" to boost his reputation and achieve his dream of becoming a Senator, and breaks up with her ("Serious"). He also tells her that his brother is at Yale Law along with his new wife, who is a Vanderbilt.

Elle is devastated and stays in her room for twelve days ("Daughter of Delta Nu"), but decides to follow Warner to Harvard Law School to prove that she can be serious. With help from her Delta Nu sister Kate, Elle studies for the LSAT. Instead of writing a personal essay, Elle bursts into the Harvard admission offices backed up by a squad of cheerleaders and frat boys. She is accepted after revealing she is motivated by love ("What You Want").

At Harvard, Elle's highly-achieved classmates disapprove of her attire and personality, and the only person who is willing to help her is teaching assistant Emmett Forrest ("The Harvard Variations"). Following a suggestion from Elle's classmate, Vivienne Kensington, the conniving Professor Callahan kicks Elle out of his class because she did not read the case he assigned, and Emmett is unable to help her ("Blood in the Water"). Afterwards, Elle finds out that Vivienne is Warner's new girlfriend. This "tragedy" summons the apparitions of the sisters of Delta Nu who, acting as a Greek chorus visible and audible only to Elle, encourage her to stay positive ("Positive").

Elle, believing that being blonde is the problem, decides to become a brunette. At the nearby Hair Affair salon, Elle meets beautician and Hair Affair owner, Paulette Buonufonte. Paulette tells Elle that all bad hair decisions are motivated by love and reveals her dreams of meeting a handsome Irishman. Paulette encourages Elle not to give up or downplay her personal qualities ("Ireland"). At the salon, Vivienne, who is discussing a party planned for next Friday, unexpectedly gives Elle an invitation, telling her it is a costume party. Paulette gives Elle a costume for the party and more words of encouragement ("Ireland (Reprise)").

Walking into the party dressed as a Playboy Bunny, Elle soon realizes that she was tricked by Vivienne, as no one else is wearing a costume. Despite this, she still seeks out Warner in an effort to win him back, but he remains unimpressed, only caring about her looks ("Serious (Reprise)"). Elle runs from the party, only to meet Emmett, who struggles to understand Elle's romantic problems. Emmett helps Elle assess her priorities, and she realizes her obsession with Warner is preventing her from gaining his respect. Freed from her need to please Warner, she defeats him in a classroom debate ("Chip On My Shoulder"). Elle helps Paulette get custody of her dog back from her ex-boyfriend, using legal jargon and demonstrating that she is beginning to understand law ("Run Rufus Run / Elle Reflects").

Warner, Vivienne, and Enid win three of Callahan's four coveted internship positions. Warner proposes to Vivienne on the spot in front of Elle, and Vivienne accepts. Elle is devastated, but Emmett shows her the internship list, revealing Elle got an internship position as well. Elle realizes that she does not need a man to feel accepted in the world, and that all she needs is to believe in herself. Overjoyed, she celebrates, and eagerly anticipates the trial ("So Much Better").

=== Act two ===
Callahan, Elle, Emmett, Vivienne, Warner, and Enid watch a workout video made by fitness queen Brooke Wyndham and her fitness team, while Callahan tells the legal team that Brooke is accused of murdering her billionaire husband ("Whipped Into Shape"). At the jail, the legal team is unable to get Brooke to tell them her alibi and she refuses to plead guilty. Upon learning that they were both Delta Nu members ("Delta Nu Nu Nu"), Brooke then privately tells Elle her alibi; Brooke was getting liposuction, and she believes revealing the truth could ruin her reputation as a fitness guru. Brooke makes Elle promise not to tell anyone. Because of Elle's loyalty to her client and refusal to state the alibi, both Elle and, consequently, Emmett, are shunned by the group. To cheer Emmett up and to increase his chances of impressing Callahan, Elle gives him a makeover ("Take It Like a Man").

Back at the salon, Elle is getting a manicure when Kyle, a sexy UPS courier, walks into the salon to deliver a package to Paulette. Paulette is in awe of Kyle, but her low self-confidence prevents her from making a move. When he leaves, Pilar, Serena, and Margot are summoned by Paulette's amazing "Bend and Snap" when picking up the package. The sorority girls tell Paulette to use the "Bend and Snap" dance move on Kyle to turn him on, but when she does, she accidentally breaks his nose ("Bend and Snap").

At the trial, Brooke's pool boy Nikos claims to have been having an affair with Brooke, giving her a motive for murdering her husband. After doing the "Bend and Snap" in front of Nikos and getting no response, Elle suspects that Nikos is gay. With the exception of Brooke, Elle's teammates and Callahan are not convinced and debate whether his perceived flamboyance is because he is homosexual or because he is European. Emmett successfully makes Nikos slip and state that his boyfriend's name is Carlos, although Nikos claims that he misunderstood "boyfriend" for "best friend". Carlos, fed up with the closeted nature of his gay boyfriend, appears from the gallery and proclaims Nikos's homosexuality. Nikos confesses that he is indeed gay and European ("There! Right There!").

Later that night in Callahan's office, the interns celebrate Elle's skill. Callahan dismisses Emmett and the other interns but requests Elle to remain for a few moments. After telling Elle she has instincts, Callahan forcibly kisses her, leading her to slap him. Warner and Vivienne both see the kiss through the door, but only Vivienne sees the slap. Elle asks Callahan if he only gave her the internship because he wanted to seduce her. Callahan fires Elle. After Callahan leaves, Warner re-enters the office and mocks Elle for allegedly sleeping with Callahan, but Vivienne tells him to shut up and they both leave. Elle becomes distraught and prepares to go home, and tells Emmett what Callahan did. Emmett asks her to stay, but before he can admit his love for her, she leaves ("Legally Blonde").

Elle heads to the Hair Affair to say goodbye to Paulette, but before she can leave, Vivienne and Enid convince Elle otherwise. Elle discards her lawyerly navy suit, dons a pink dress and leads a parade back to the courtroom. Elle's parents, as well as Delta Nu, arrive, having come to visit her. They all meet Kyle on the way, who has taken a liking to Paulette, and reveals himself to be Irish, prompting everyone present to Irish dance. Back at the trial, Brooke fires Callahan and hires Elle ("Legally Blonde Remix"). Brooke's stepdaughter Chutney goes to the witness stand and her testimony is damning, stating after she got out of the shower she saw Brooke covered in her father's blood. After Chutney states she received a perm the day of the murder, Elle realizes a flaw in Chutney's alibi and suggests that the entire court should be moved to the scene of the crime—the bathroom where the murder took place ("Scene of the Crime").

As a demonstration, Elle asks Paulette to give Enid a perm and asks Enid to step into the shower upon entering the crime scene. Relying on her knowledge of hair maintenance, Elle's demonstration is successful as Enid walks out of the shower with completely flattened hair, revealing that Chutney could not have possibly showered immediately after getting a perm because her perm was still intact. Under Elle's intense questioning, Chutney confesses that she killed her father, thinking that she was killing Brooke. Chutney is arrested and Brooke is set free. Brooke accidentally admits she had liposuction, but doesn't lose any fans ("Omigod You Guys (Reprise)").

Warner proposes to Elle, having been dumped by Vivienne. Elle gently refuses, claiming to have been changed by the experience. Three years later, Elle ends up as the valedictorian of her class. Paulette tells the audience that Elle is not one to brag about her valedictorian status, so she decided to allow Paulette to play "Where Are They Now" during her speech. Paulette says that Enid practices family law, Vivienne is training for the Peace Corps, and Warner dropped out to pursue a modeling career. Callahan ran for governor but was defeated, and his wife hired Emmett to handle their divorce. Paulette married Kyle, had two kids and is pregnant with a third. They live in Worcester, Massachusetts (Later replaced with their third child being named Seamus), and Paulette bought a new salon ("Find My Way"). At the end of the graduation, Elle proposes to Emmett, who happily accepts ("Finale").

== Musical numbers ==
† - Not featured on Original Broadway Cast Recording

=== Act I ===
- “Overture” †
- "Omigod You Guys" – Elle, Serena, Margot, Pilar, Salesgirls, and Delta Nus
- "Serious" – Warner and Elle
- "Daughter of Delta Nu" – Serena, Margot, Pilar and Delta Nus †
- "What You Want" – Elle, Serena, Margot, Pilar, Kate, Elle's Parents, Grandmaster Chad and Company
- "The Harvard Variations" – Emmett, Aaron, Enid, Padamadan, Warner and Harvard Students
- "Blood in the Water" – Callahan, Aaron, Enid, Elle, Vivienne and Harvard Students
- "Positive" – Elle, Serena, Margot, Pilar and Greek Chorus
- "Ireland" – Paulette
- "Ireland" (Reprise) – Paulette
- "Serious" (Reprise) – Elle and Warner
- "Chip On My Shoulder" – Emmett, Elle, Greek Chorus
- "Run Rufus Run/Elle Reflects"- Elle †
- "So Much Better" – Elle, Greek Chorus and Company

=== Act II ===
- “Entr’acte” †
- "Whipped into Shape" – Brooke, Callahan and Company
- "Delta Nu Nu Nu" – Elle and Brooke †
- "Take It Like a Man" – Elle, Emmett and Salespeople
- "Bend and Snap" – Elle, Paulette, Serena, Margot, Pilar, Hairdressers, Kyle, and Company
- "There! Right There!" – Elle, Callahan, Emmett, Brooke, Vivienne, Warner, Enid, Judge, Nikos, Carlos and Company
- "Legally Blonde" – Elle and Emmett
- "Legally Blonde Remix" – Vivienne, Elle, Paulette, Kyle, Enid, Elle's Parents, Margot, Serena, Pilar, Brooke and Company
- "Scene of the Crime" – Elle, Judge, Serena, Margot, Pilar and Company †
- "Omigod You Guys (Reprise)" – Elle, Brooke, Margot, Serena, Pilar, Judge, and Company †
- "Find My Way/Finale" – Elle, Paulette, Emmett and Company

During its San Francisco run, the musical included a song called "Love and War", but during its transfer to Broadway, the song was reworked into what is now "Positive". Another predecessor to "Positive" was "Beacon of Positivity".

During the workshop stage, the song "Good Boy" existed in place of what would later become "Ireland" in the musical. In "Good Boy", Paulette and Elle bond over the idea that men are like dogs and should therefore be treated as such.

"Kyle the Magnificent" and "Bows" are featured as digital bonus tracks of the live London cast recording. "Kyle the Magnificent" is also a hidden track on the Broadway cast recording at the end of "Find My Way/Finale".

== Instrumentation ==
The licensed orchestration follows the orchestration that was used in the West End production: three keyboards, bass, guitar, drums, percussion, two woodwind parts, two trumpets, trombone, and solo violin. The first keyboard part is played by the conductor. The bass part doubles on electric bass, double bass, fretless bass, and 5-string bass. The guitar doubles on electric, acoustic, nylon-string, Hollow Body archtop and 12-string guitars, as well as mandolin. The first woodwind part doubles on alto sax, flute, piccolo, clarinet, oboe (optional), and English horn (optional); the second part doubles on flute, clarinet, and baritone sax. Both trumpets double on flugelhorn and the trombone doubles on tenor and bass trombones.

This orchestration was originally used for the first United States national tour, without the violin and with slightly different reed doublings. The first reed player doubled on alto sax, clarinet, flute, piccolo, oboe (optional), and English horn (optional); the second player doubled on flute, clarinet, bass clarinet, tenor and baritone sax, and pennywhistle.

In addition to the licensed orchestration, the original Broadway production also had a French horn part, a viola and cello part, a second guitar, and had three woodwind parts instead of two. The first reed part doubled on alto sax, clarinet, flute, piccolo, and pennywhistle; the second part doubled on clarinet, flute, oboe, English horn, and tenor sax; the third doubled on flute, clarinet, bass clarinet, bassoon, and baritone sax. The percussion book uses both pitched and unpitched percussion.

== Production history ==
=== Broadway (2007–2008) ===
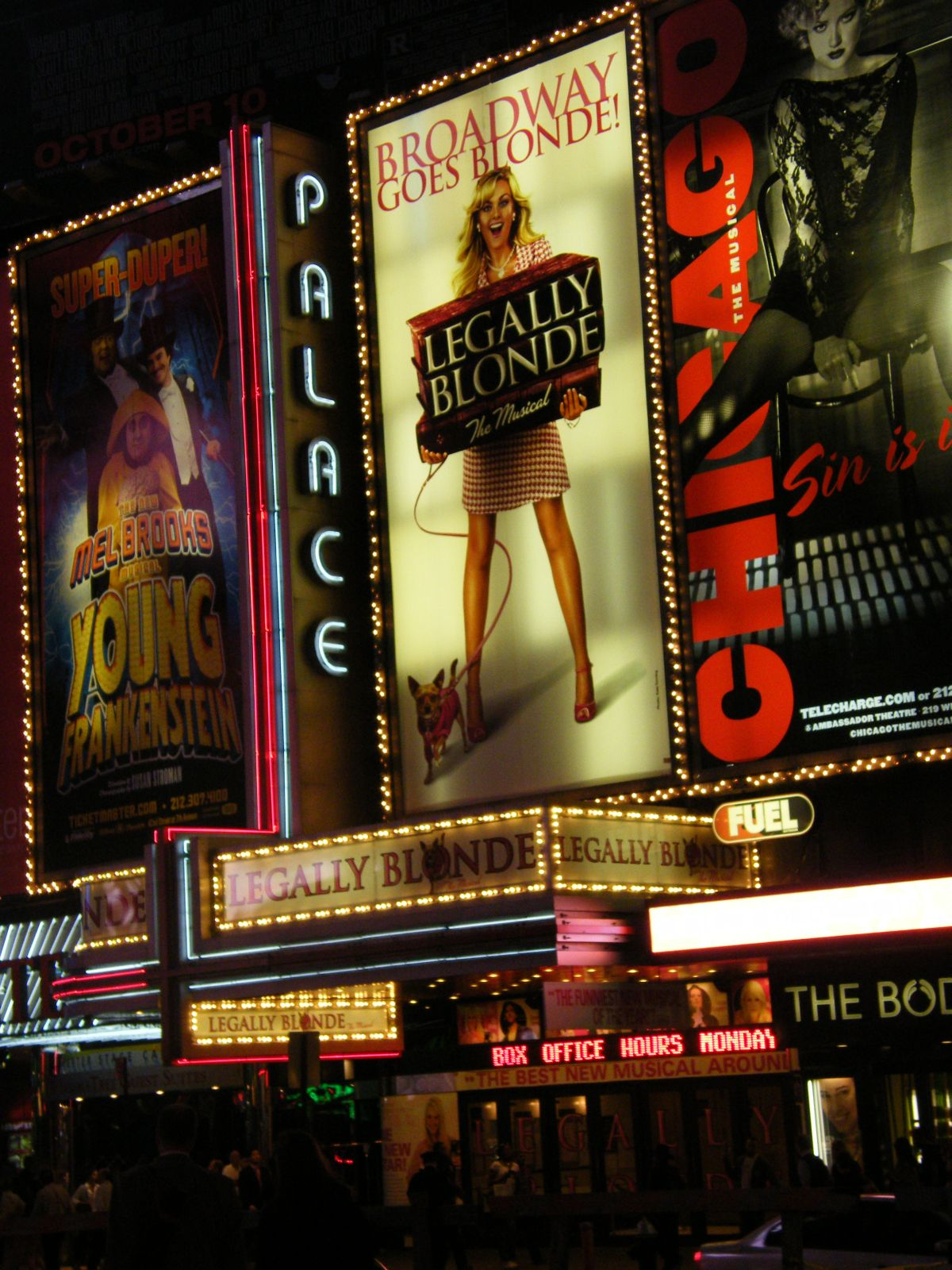
At the Palace Theatre

Before going to Broadway, Legally Blonde did a short tryout at San Francisco's Golden Gate Theatre from January 23 to February 24, 2007, with an official opening on February 6. Legally Blonde later opened on Broadway at the Palace Theatre on April 29, 2007, following previews which began on April 3. The production was directed and choreographed by Jerry Mitchell, with set design by David Rockwell, costume design by Gregg Barnes, sound design by Acme Sound Partners, and lighting design by Kenneth Posner and Paul Miller. The original Broadway cast included Laura Bell Bundy in the lead role of Elle Woods and featured Christian Borle, Orfeh, and Michael Rupert. The show received mixed reviews and was nominated for seven Tony Awards, including Best Original Score and Best Leading Actress in a Musical, but did not win any.

The musical was filmed for television in front of a live audience on September 18, 2007, as well as two other dates where it was filmed without an audience. The three performances edited together were broadcast on MTV hosted by Audrina Patridge, Lauren Conrad, and Whitney Port on October 13 and 14, 2007, with subsequent air dates on November 3 and 14, 2007. MTV's involvement with the musical continued with a reality show program called Legally Blonde: The Musical – The Search for Elle Woods, which aimed to cast the next actress to play Elle Woods on Broadway, replacing Laura Bell Bundy. The show was hosted by Haylie Duff and premiered on June 2, 2008, on MTV. The show ran for eight episodes. The focus was on the preparation and coaching of the contestants, as well as the auditions themselves. The competition was won by Bailey Hanks, age 20, from Anderson, South Carolina. The results were first aired on July 21, 2008, on MTV, and Hanks's debut as Elle Woods was on July 23. The runner-up, Autumn Hurlbert, also debuted on Broadway in this show as a sorority sister in Delta Nu, as well as serving as Hanks's understudy.

The production closed on October 19, 2008, after playing 30 previews and 595 regular performances. The run was considered a financial disappointment and failed to fully recoup its investment.

=== North American tours ===
The first national tour started on September 23, 2008. Becky Gulsvig, who appeared in the ensemble of the original Broadway cast and understudied the role of Elle Woods, was featured as Elle Woods. Lauren Ashley Zakrin and Rhiannon Hansen, both finalists of the MTV reality show, appeared in the national tour. Becky Gulsvig and the touring company's ensemble performed a shortened-version of the act-one finale, So Much Better, at the 63rd Annual Tony Awards in 2009 to promote the tour. The original tour closed on August 10, 2010, in Vienna, Virginia, at the Wolf Trap National Park for the Performing Arts.

The first non-Equity tour launched in Jackson, Mississippi, on September 21, 2010. Nikki Bohne led the cast as Elle Woods, with Kahlil Joseph as Professor Callahan. The tour closed on May 15, 2011, at the Shubert Theatre in New Haven, Connecticut.

A new non-equity tour launched on January 19, 2019 at the Lutcher Theater in Orange, Texas, featuring all new scaled-back costumes, sets, and orchestrations, and closed on April 14, 2019 at the Civic Arts Plaza in Thousand Oaks, California. The cast was led by Maris McCulley as Elle Woods. The tour went back on the road in 2022, starring Hannah Bonnett as Elle Woods. It opened on October 14, 2022 at the Walton Arts Center in Fayetteville, AR, and closed on May 21, 2023, at the Kravis Center in West Palm Beach, Florida.

=== West End (2010–2012) ===
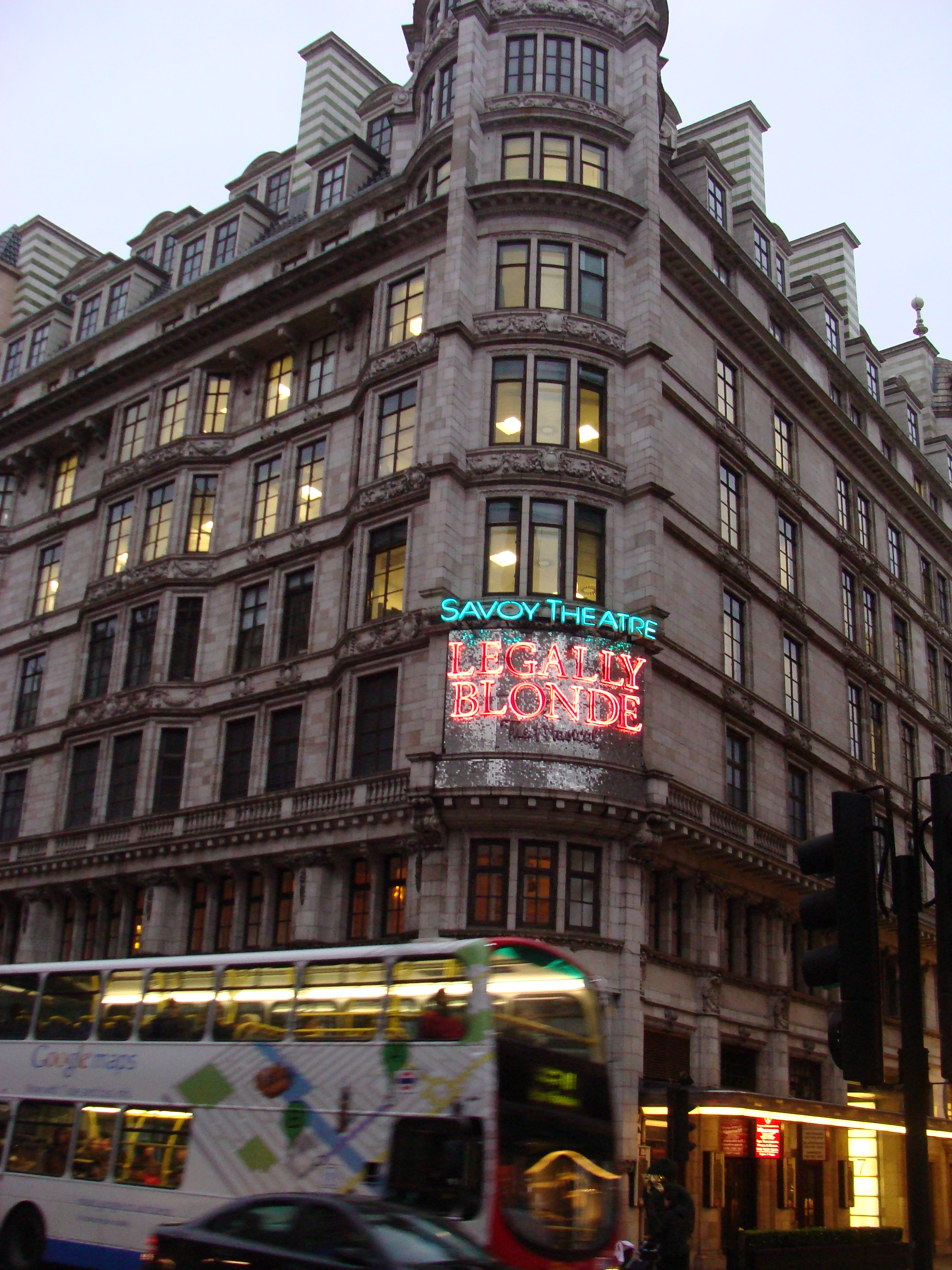
At the Savoy Theatre

The West End production opened at the Savoy Theatre on January 13, 2010, following previews from December 5, 2009. The original London cast included Sheridan Smith in the lead role of Elle Woods, with Duncan James, Alex Gaumond, Jill Halfpenny and Peter Davison. In the London production, the lyrics to "Ireland" were changed.

In October 2009, Sheridan Smith, with other cast members, recorded a pop video to the song "So Much Better". The West End cast of Legally Blonde performed a medley from the show at the BBC Television Centre on November 19, 2009, during the Children in Need telethon.

Legally Blonde was the first West End show to offer a ticket lottery. The trend is popular on Broadway but had never been used for a West End production. The show had taken £2 million in advance sales before it officially opened. It extended its booking period from the earlier date of October 2011 until March 31, 2012.

Susan McFadden replaced Sheridan Smith as Elle on January 10, 2011. McFadden was later replaced by Carley Stenson on July 11, 2011. Other notable replacements included Richard Fleeshman and Ben Freeman as Warner, Denise van Outen and Natalie Casey as Paulette, Lee Mead and Stephen Ashfield as Emmett, Carley Stenson as Margot, and Siobhan Dillon as Vivienne.

The West End show won three Laurence Olivier Awards on March 13, 2011: Best New Musical, Best Actress in a Musical (Sheridan Smith), and Best Performance in a Supporting Role in a Musical (Jill Halfpenny).

The show closed in London on April 7, 2012, after 974 performances, significantly more than it played on Broadway.

=== First UK tour (2011–2012) ===
The first UK tour began on July 8, 2011, at the Liverpool Empire Theatre. The cast included Faye Brooks as Elle, Dave Willetts as Professor Callahan, and Iwan Lewis as Emmett. Liz McClarnon initially played Paulette, followed by Claire Sweeney.

Following Willets, Professor Callahan was played by Matthew Kelly, and later Les Dennis, alongside Niki Evans as Paulette. Amy Lennox covered as Elle for the Aberdeen run of the tour, with Stephen Ashfield briefly reprising his role as Emmett just weeks after leaving the show in London. On July 17, 2012, Jennifer Ellison replaced Niki Evans as Paulette, and Gareth Gates replaced Ray Quinn as Warner.

The final show of the UK tour was performed at the New Wimbledon Theatre on October 6, 2012.

=== Curve Theatre Leicester (2016) ===
In April and May 2016, a production was presented at the Curve Theatre, Leicester. The cast included X-Factor finalist Lucie Jones cast as Elle Woods, Ian Kelsey as Callahan, Tupele Dorgu as Paulette, Jon Robyns as Emmett, and Danny Mac as Warner.

=== Second UK tour (2017–2018) ===
Throughout 2017 and 2018, the second national UK tour of Legally Blonde performed with a new cast. The first performance was at the Churchill Theatre from September 14 to 23, 2017, and its final performance was at the Palace Theatre on June 30, 2018. The cast included Lucie Jones as Elle Woods, David Barret as Emmet, Liam Doyle as Warner, Rita Simons as Paulette, Helen Petrovna as Brooke, and Laura Harrison as Vivienne.

=== Regent's Park Open Air Theatre (2022) ===
A production directed by Lucy Moss and choreographed by Ellen Kane ran at London's Regent's Park Open Air Theatre from 13 May to 2 July 2022, starring Courtney Bowman as Elle, Michael Ahomka-Lindsay as Emmett, Lauren Drew as Brooke, Vanessa Fisher as Vivienne, Iz Hesketh as Margot, Nadine Higgin as Paulette, Alžbeta Matyšáková as Enid, Eugene McCoy as Callahan, Grace Mouat as Pilar, Alistair Toovey as Warner, and Hannah Yun Chamberlain as Serena. Hesketh was the first Trans Non-Binary Person to play Margot and Matyšáková was the first Trans Non-Binary person to play Enid in a professional production of the show, with the character of Enid having been changed to match Matyšáková Non-Binary identity. This production received mixed to negative reviews, with The Times awarding just two stars out of five and Quentin Letts remarking that "Moss’s direction fails to create a contrast" between variety and condescension.

=== Third UK and Ireland tour (2026-present) ===
The third UK and Ireland tour of Legally Blonde had its first performance on February 7, 2026 at the Curve Theatre, Leicester, starring Amber Davies as Elle Woods, George Crawford as Emmett, Jocasta Almgill as Brooke, Karen Mavundukure as Paulette, Annabelle Terry as Vivienne and Hannah Lowther as Margot/Alternate Elle Woods . The tour spans from February 2026 to January 2027 throughout the UK and Ireland.

On 15 September 2026, it was announced that the UK and Ireland tour would be transferring to West End's London Coliseum for a limited engagement from 22 March to 22 May 2027, with Amber Davies reprising her role as Elle Woods.

=== International productions ===
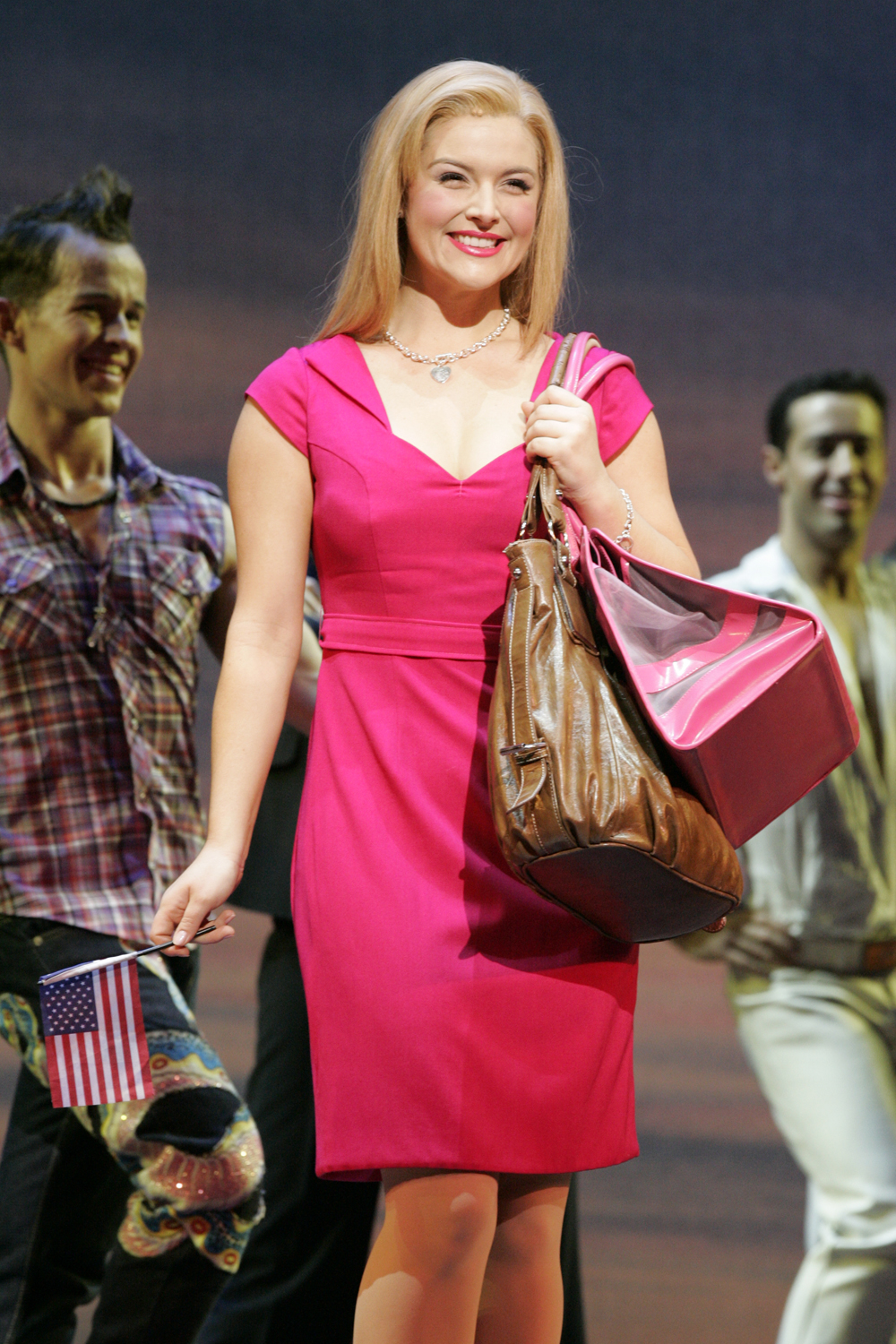
Lucy Durack as Elle Woods in 2012

Legally Blonde has had international productions in South Korea, China, Malaysia, Singapore, Japan, the Netherlands, the Philippines, Sweden, Finland, Austria, Dominican Republic, Panama, New Zealand, Germany, Indonesia and Belgium.

In Paris, France, a French-language production opened on May 17, 2012, at Le Palace. The show was a commercial flop and closed on June 10, 2012, after only three weeks because of the lack of spectators.

An Australian production began previews in September 2012 at the Lyric Theatre, Sydney, before opening on October 4, 2012. Lucy Durack played Elle Woods with Rob Mills as Warner, David Harris as Emmett, Erika Heynatz as Brooke Wyndham, and Helen Dallimore as Paulette, with Cameron Daddo returning to the Australian stage for the first time in 20 years to play Professor Callahan. The production concluded its run at Melbourne's Princess Theatre on July 14, 2013. The show won five Helpmann Awards, including Best Musical.

A Hebrew-language production of Legally Blonde premiered in Israel in February 2020. The cast included Ania Bukstein as Elle Woods, Oz Zehavi as Emmett, Sassi Keshet as Professor Callahan, Hana Laszlo as Paulette, and Mei Finegold as Brooke.

A Spanish-language production ran from October 9, 2023 to February 4, 2024 at the Teatro La Latina in Madrid, Spain. The cast included Lucía Ambrossi as Elle Woods, Íñigo Etayo as Emmett, Maia Contreras as Paulette, and Ricky Merino as Wagner.

A Brazilian production ran from July 2024 to October 2024 at the Claro Mais Theater in São Paulo. The cast included Myra Ruiz, also known as brazilian Elphaba, as Elle Woods, Renan Rosiq as Warner Huntington III, Hipólyto as Emmett Forrest, Leilah Moreno as Paulette Bonafonté, Danilo Moura as Professor Callahan, Gigi Debei as Vivienne Kensington and Amanda Döring as Brooke Wyndham.

== Principal roles ==
Character	Voice type	Description
Elle Woods	Mezzo-Soprano G♭3 - G5	The president of the UCLA Delta Nu sorority who finds herself at Harvard University studying to become a lawyer.
Emmett Forrest	Tenor A2 - A4	A hardworking teacher's assistant at Harvard who falls for Elle.
Warner Huntington III	Tenor A2 - A♭4	Elle's suave and opportunist ex-boyfriend.
Paulette	Mezzo-Soprano A3 - A5	A spunky hair stylist who becomes Elle's friend.
Vivienne Kensington	Mezzo-Soprano A3 - F5, optional G#5	A no-nonsense law student and Warner's new girlfriend.
Professor Callahan	Baritone A2 - G♭4	A cruel and intense law professor, and practicing attorney.
Brooke Wyndham	Mezzo-Soprano A3 - G5	An exercise queen on trial for the murder of her husband.
Margot	Soprano A♭3 - F5	One of Elle's sorority sisters who later serves as part of a "Greek Chorus" in Elle's mind. She is dimwitted and bubbly.
Serena	Soprano A♭3 - F5	One of Elle's sorority sisters who later serves as part of a "Greek Chorus" in Elle's mind. Captain of UCLA's cheer team.
Pilar	Soprano A♭3 - F5	One of Elle's sorority sisters who later serves as part of a "Greek Chorus" in Elle's mind.

== Casts ==
The principal original casts of the major productions of Legally Blonde.

Character	Broadway	First US Tour	West End	Second US Tour	First UK Tour	Second UK Tour	Third US Tour	London Revival	Fourth US Tour	Third UK Tour
Character	2007	2008	2010		2011	2017	2019	2022		2026
Elle Woods	Laura Bell Bundy	Becky Gulsvig	Sheridan Smith	Nikki Bohne	Faye Brookes	Lucie Jones	Maris McCulley	Courtney Bowman	Hannah Bonnett	Amber Davies
Emmett Forrest	Christian Borle	D.B. Bonds	Alex Gaumond	Nic Rouleau	Iwan Lewis	David Barrett	Woody Minshew	Michael Ahomka-Lindsay	Aathaven Tharmarajah	George Crawford
Paulette	Orfeh	Natalie Joy Johnson	Jill Halfpenny	Jillian Wallach	Liz McClarnon	Rita Simons	Jill Taylor Anthony	Nadine Higgin	Ashley Morton	Karen Mavundukure
Professor Callahan	Michael Rupert	Ken Land	Peter Davison	Kahlil Joseph	Dave Willetts	Bill Ward	Chris Carsten	Eugene McCoy	Chris Carsten	Adam Cooper
Warner Huntington III	Richard H. Blake	Jeff Mclean	Duncan James	Matthew Ragas	Neil Toon	Liam Doyle	James Oblak	Alistair Toovey	James Oblak	Jamie Chatterton
Vivienne Kensington	Kate Shindle	Megan Lewis	Caroline Keiff	Hannah Cruz	Charlotte Harwood	Laura Harrison	Berlande Millus	Vanessa Fisher	Lea Sevola	Annabelle Terry
Brooke Wyndham	Nikki Snelson	Coleen Sexton	Aoife Mulholland	Shannon Mullen	Hannah Grover	Helen Petrovna	Megan Hoxie	Lauren Drew	Kaelee Albritton	Jocasta Almgill
Enid	Natalie Joy Johnson	Gretchen Burghart	Suzie McAdam	Sarah Beth Pfeifer	Gemma Baird	Nancy Hill	Nora Elkind	Alžbeta Matyšáková	Harley Barton	Keanna Bloomfield
Kyle	Andy Karl	Ven Daniel	Chris Ellis-Stanton	Michael Milton	Lewis Griffiths	Ben Harlow	Dorian Quinn	Dominic Lamb	Matthew Dean Hollis	Ty-Reece Stewart
Serena	Leslie Kritzer	Cortney Wolfson	Susan McFadden	Nadia Vynnytsky	Sinead Long	Rachel Grundy	Chelsea Lorraine Wargo	Hannah Yun Chamberlain	Taylor Lloyd	Rosanna Harris
Margot	Annaleigh Ashford	Rhiannon Hansen	Amy Lennox	Maggie Taylor	Sophie Isaacs	Rebecca Stenhouse	Andee Buccheri	Iz Hesketh	Jesse Lynn Harte	Hannah Lowther
Pilar	DeQuina Moore	Crystal Joy	Ibinabo Jack	Brit West	Micha Richardson	Delycia Belgrave	Kayla Jenerson	Grace Mouat	Rory Furey-King	Remi Ferdinand

- The cast for the TV airing, filmed in mid-September 2007, consisted of the entire original Broadway cast, except for Tracy Jai Edwards taking over for Leslie Kritzer as Serena and Asmeret Ghebremichael replacing DeQuina Moore as Pilar. Moore departed from the production in July 2007, and Kritzer left in August that same year.

=== Notable Broadway replacements ===
- Elle Woods: Bailey Hanks
- Margot: Kate Rockwell
- Pilar: Asmeret Ghebremichael

== Critical response ==
The musical received mixed reviews but was praised for being a fun and upbeat production. Ben Brantley, reviewing the musical in The New York Times, wrote that the show was a "high-energy, empty-calories, and expensive-looking hymn to the glories of girlishness". He praised Laura Bell Bundy, saying, "she sings and dances flawlessly, and she delivers silly lines as if she meant them." Clive Barnes, in his New York Post review, praised Heather Hach's book but criticized the "amorphous, synthetic, and maniacally empty-headed music", summarizing the show as "a pleasant if noisy night out". Elysa Gardner for USA Today wrote that the musical was an "ingratiating trifle", and the "game cast ensure that the proceedings, however patronizing, aren't irritating." Jeremy McCarter in New York Magazine lamented that the musical "doesn’t summon memories of Tracy Flick, the steely student-council campaigner that Reese Witherspoon played in Election before starring in Legally Blonde", writing that the "Flickish manic drive" in Witherspoon's Legally Blonde performance had been his favorite part of the film.

The West End production received mostly positive reviews. Benedict Nightingale in The Times wrote, "Let's overlook some forgettable tunes and welcome dance that embraces everything from skipping with ropes to spoof Riverdance. Let's relish the support both of a fake-Greek chorus dressed as cheerleaders and of two cute, unnaturally obedient dogs. Let's agree that Legally Blonde is, well, fun". Paul Taylor for The Independent called the show "Ridiculously enjoyable from start to finish."

The show also received some negative criticism. Tim Walker wrote in The Sunday Telegraph: "It is a great big empty vessel of a show that makes a lot of noise and not much else, and would have been better entitled 'Irredeemably Bland'. I was aware that for the whole of the two hours and 25 minutes that it ran, I was sitting among a group of people with vacant smiles on faces that otherwise seemed entirely numbed. That was how I looked, too. It is the expression that registers when what one is seeing doesn't entirely sync with what is going on in one's brain."

== Recordings ==
The Original Broadway Cast recording was recorded on May 7 and 8, 2007, and released on July 17, 2007, by Ghostlight Records (an imprint of Sh-K-Boom Records). During the week of July 23, 2007, the cast album made its debut on Billboard's Cast Album chart, placing at #1, and it charted at #86 on the Billboard 200.

Before previews, a promotional sampler CD was released including "Omigod You Guys", "So Much Better", and "Take It Like a Man", featuring a slightly divergent cast, arrangement and lyrics of that of the final show's.

During the development phase of the musical, a demo recording was released with twelve songs featuring Kerry Butler and others as Elle. The demo featured workshop versions of "There! Right There!" (labelled on the sampler as "Gay or European"), "Blood in the Water", "Omigod You Guys", "Serious", "What You Want", "Legally Blonde", "Legally Blonde Remix", "So Much Better", and "Take It Like a Man", in addition to two songs not present in the finalized version of the show: "Beacon of Positivity" (which became "Love and War" for the previews and eventually "Positive" for the finalized version of the show) and "Good Boy", a song in the place of "Ireland".

Bailey Hanks, who won the reality show The Search for Elle Woods, recorded the song "So Much Better", which was released as a single on July 22, 2008.

A live London cast recording was recorded featuring Sheridan Smith, Alex Gaumond, and Duncan James in June 2010. It was released on August 16, 2010. The London Cast Recording used the same track listing as the Broadway Cast Recording, with bonus tracks "Kyle the Magnificent" and the curtain call music added to the digital download version.

== Awards and nominations ==
=== Original Broadway production ===
Year	Award Ceremony	Category	Nominee	Result
2007	Actors' Equity Association	Outstanding Broadway Chorus		Won
2007	Drama Desk Award	Outstanding Musical		Nominated
2007	Drama Desk Award	Outstanding Book of a Musical	Heather Hach	Nominated
2007	Drama Desk Award	Outstanding Actress in a Musical	Laura Bell Bundy	Nominated
2007	Drama Desk Award	Outstanding Featured Actor in a Musical	Christian Borle	Nominated
2007	Drama Desk Award	Outstanding Featured Actress in a Musical	Orfeh	Nominated
2007	Drama Desk Award	Outstanding Choreography	Jerry Mitchell	Nominated
2007	Drama Desk Award	Outstanding Director of a Musical	Jerry Mitchell	Nominated
2007	Drama Desk Award	Outstanding Lyrics	Laurence O'Keefe and Nell Benjamin	Nominated
2007	Drama Desk Award	Outstanding Music	Laurence O'Keefe and Nell Benjamin	Nominated
2007	Drama Desk Award	Outstanding Set Design of a Musical	David Rockwell	Nominated
2007	Drama League Award	Distinguished Production of a Musical		Nominated
2007	Drama League Award	Distinguished Performance	Laura Bell Bundy	Nominated
2007	Drama League Award	Distinguished Performance	Christian Borle	Nominated
2007	Outer Critics Circle Award	Best Featured Actress in a Musical	Orfeh	Nominated
2007	Tony Award	Best Book of a Musical	Heather Hach	Nominated
2007	Tony Award	Best Original Score	Laurence O'Keefe and Nell Benjamin	Nominated
2007	Tony Award	Best Actress in a Musical	Laura Bell Bundy	Nominated
2007	Tony Award	Best Featured Actor in a Musical	Christian Borle	Nominated
2007	Tony Award	Best Featured Actress in a Musical	Orfeh	Nominated
2007	Tony Award	Best Choreography	Jerry Mitchell	Nominated
2007	Tony Award	Best Costume Design in a Musical	Gregg Barnes	Nominated

=== North American tour ===
Year	Award Ceremony	Category	Nominee	Result
2009	Helen Hayes Award	Outstanding Performance in a Non-Resident Production	Becky Gulsvig	Nominated
2009	Touring Broadway Awards	Best New Touring Musical		Won
2009	Touring Broadway Awards	Best Design of a Touring Production		Won
2009	Touring Broadway Awards	Best Choreography of a Touring Production	Jerry Mitchell	Won

=== Original West End production ===
Year	Award Ceremony	Category	Nominee	Result
2010	Evening Standard Theatre Awards	Best Musical		Nominated
2010	Evening Standard Theatre Awards	Best Actress	Sheridan Smith	Nominated
2011	Laurence Olivier Award	Best New Musical		Won
2011	Laurence Olivier Award	Best Actor in a Musical	Alex Gaumond	Nominated
2011	Laurence Olivier Award	Best Actress in a Musical	Sheridan Smith	Won
2011	Laurence Olivier Award	Best Performance in a Supporting Role in a Musical	Jill Halfpenny	Won
2011	Laurence Olivier Award	Best Theatre Choreographer	Jerry Mitchell	Nominated
