= Karen McCullah =

American screenwriter and novelist

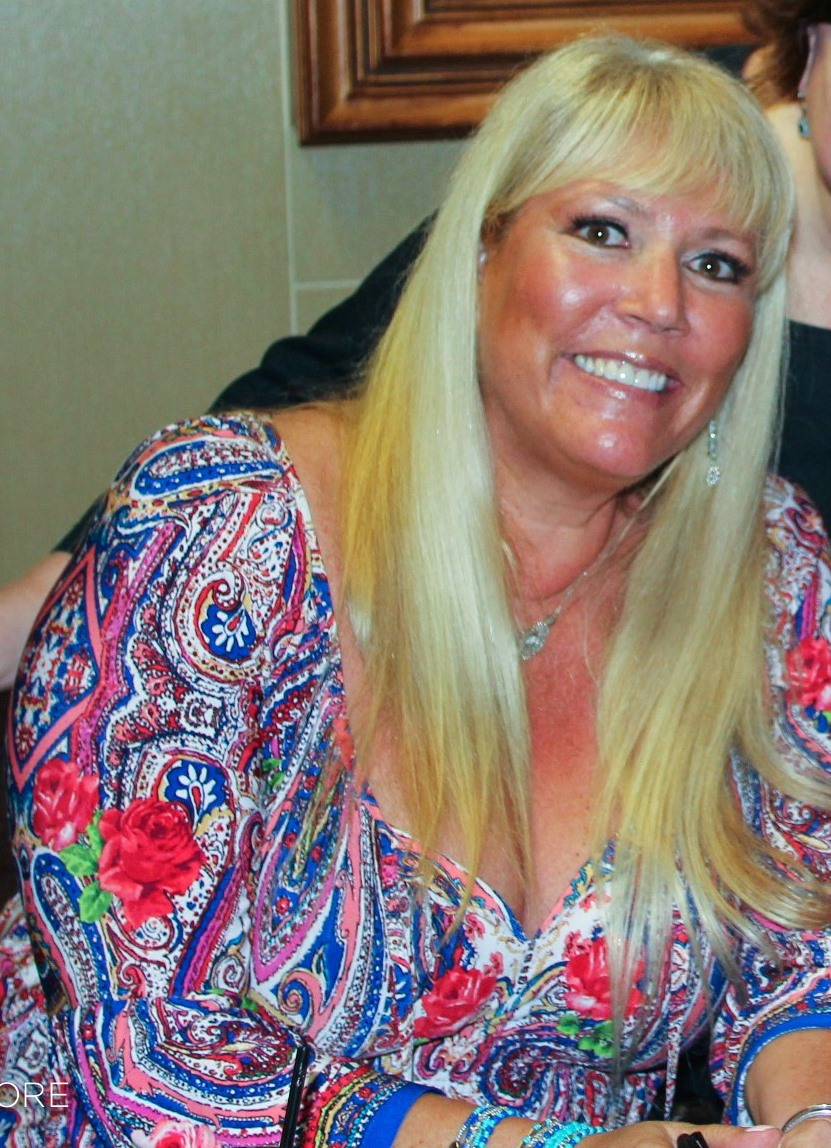
- McCullah in 2016
- Born: December 5, 1967 (age 58); Subic Bay, Philippines
- Education: Marketing B.A. (1988), James Madison University
- Occupations: Screenwriter; Novelist

Karen McCullah (born December 5, 1967) is an American screenwriter and novelist most known for co-writing comedies such as 10 Things I Hate About You, Legally Blonde, Ella Enchanted, The House Bunny, The Ugly Truth and She's the Man with her screenwriting partner Kirsten Smith. After graduating from James Madison University with a degree in marketing, McCullah worked various jobs before beginning to write. She is a faculty member at Syracuse University's Los Angeles Semester.

== Early life ==
McCullah was born in the Philippines, where her father had been assigned with the United States Navy performing counterespionage duties. She grew up in Maryland, where she attended elementary school before attending junior high in Japan, and she graduated from Indian Hills High School in Oakland, New Jersey, in Bergen County. As a high school student, she maintained in her diary 10 Things I Hate About Anthony, her boyfriend at the time, which ultimately led to the title of her 1999 film, 10 Things I Hate About You.

In 1988, McCullah graduated from James Madison University in Virginia where she was a member of Alpha Gamma Delta sorority and majored in marketing. Though she would become a writer, she received a C in creative writing. She has said her experiences at university strongly influenced her screenwriting, and she donates a yearly scholarship to the school. Before screenwriting, McCullah worked in "marketing and PR, painting furniture sold in galleries in New Mexico, travel writing, and teaching creative workshops to teen gang members," as well as various fast food jobs. She began writing in Albuquerque, New Mexico after reading a book called How to Write for Film and TV since there were no local jobs available in her field. In 2005, she wrote her first novel, The Bachelorette Party.

== Screenwriting career ==
McCullah describes many of the characters she's written as, essentially, “badass and full of mirth.” Most of her published screenplays have been co-written with Kirsten Smith; they met when Smith read one of McCullah's scripts as part of Smith's job in 1996. After letters and phone calls, the two met for margaritas and started their first script (a woman-led action-comedy) on a cocktail napkin. Though the first script did not sell, they wrote 10 Things I Hate About You while living in separate cities by mailing pages of the draft to each other. They admired and were considering following in the footsteps of Clueless, a spin on Emma, as they knew they wanted to write a teen comedy with a twist on a classic story. With a title already set from McCullah's high school diary, the duo picked Shakespeare's The Taming of the Shrew to modernize and outlined their plans while sitting on a beach in Mexico, though as McCullah said, “We definitely knew [the title character] would not be tamed at the end."

McCullah and Smith had already started adapting Legally Blonde (the novel) for film by the time 10 Things went to theaters. Of writing the main character, McCullah said: "It was fun to play with that dynamic with [the rich, pretty, popular girl] being the underdog, having to prove herself to other people even when she was completely capable." They spent two days on Stanford's campus in the spring of 2000 doing research for the screenplay.

They were actively involved during filming, sometimes rewriting in the middle of the night and suggesting Luke Wilson as the love interest during casting. Originally, the "bend and snap" scene — where main character Elle explains to her new, older friend Paulette how to get her crush's attention — almost didn't make it into the movie. At first, the writers spent a week or two trying to figure out what the plot for Paulette should be, pitching "scene after scene" of crime plots that "all felt very tonally weird." Later, while brainstorming at a bar in Los Angeles, McCullah came up with a solution: "What if Elle shows [Paulette] a move so she can get the UPS guy?" On the spur of the moment, Smith invented a move, standing up and demonstrating what would become the bend and snap. Smith explains, "It was a spontaneous invention. It was a completely drunken moment in a bar."

The film originally ended with Elle winning the movie's pivotal case and sharing a victory kiss with Emmett, then starting a Blonde Legal Defense Club at law school in the future. After test audiences revealed they didn't like this ending, McCullah and Smith consulted with the production team and they all agreed a new conclusion was necessary. "It was just kind of a weak ending," explained McCullah. "The kiss didn't feel right because it's not a rom-com — it wasn't about their relationship. So test audiences were saying, 'We want to see what happens — we want to see her succeed.' So that's why we rewrote for graduation," which became the movie's new ending.

The duo's modern day writing process generally involves co-writing a first draft, editing it separately, and redrafting it, usually turning in a 6th or 7th draft. McCullah's personal preferred way to write is outside in the sun, as she states "It’s hard for me to be funny in the rain."

McCullah's is currently a faculty member at Syracuse University's Los Angeles Semester. Her future projects include Hope, a Netflix rom-com starring Aubrey Plaza, and Party Girls, a comedy picked up by Paramount Pictures, all with her screenwriting partner Smith.

== Writing ==
=== Novels ===
- The Bachelorette Party (2006) - ISBN 978-0-312-32621-0

=== Films ===
- 10 Things I Hate About You (1999) - an adaptation of William Shakespeare's The Taming of the Shrew set in a modern American high school
- Legally Blonde (2001) - screen adaptation of Amanda Brown's novel Legally Blonde
- Ella Enchanted (2004) - screen adaptation of Gail Carson Levine's 1997 novel Ella Enchanted
- She's the Man (2006) - an adaptation of William Shakespeare's play Twelfth Night, or What You Will.
- The House Bunny (2008)
- The Ugly Truth (2009)
- Crazy Kind of Love (2013)
- The Last Resort (2027)
- Party Girls (upcoming)
- Hope (upcoming)

=== Screenplays (unproduced) ===
- a screenplay of her novel The Bachelorette Party.
