= Moonie (dog) =

Chihuahua canine actor

- Moonie in a promotional photo for the film Legally Blonde
- Breed: Chihuahua
- Sex: Male
- Born: 1998
- Died: 10 March 2016 (aged 17–18); Los Angeles, California, United States
- Occupation: Canine actor
- Notable role: Legally Blonde, Legally Blonde 2: Red, White & Blonde
- Years active: 2001–2014
- Owners: Sue Chipperton, Studio Animal Services

Moonie (1998 – March 10, 2016), also known as Moondoggie, was a canine actor. He was a Chihuahua best known for his role as Bruiser Woods in the films Legally Blonde and Legally Blonde 2: Red, White & Blonde, appearing alongside actress Reese Witherspoon. He lived with Gidget, another Chihuahua who was famous for her Taco Bell commercials.

In March 2016, Moonie died at the age of 18.

== Early life ==
Moonie was born in 1998. He was taken in as a puppy by Studio Animal Services trainer, Sue Chipperton. Sue had also helped train the chihuahua Gidget, who had already made a name for herself as a mascot for the Taco Bell restaurant chain. Chipperton had learned that the producers of Legally Blonde were looking to cast a Chihuahua in the film, but Gidget's busy schedule ruled out the possibility of her auditioning for the role. Two other trainers had discovered Moonie, then a puppy, and suggested to Chipperton, a trainer for Studio Animal Services, that she train and submit him for the role instead, given her experience and success working with Chihuahuas.

== Acting career ==
Moonie's breakout role was in 2001, when he appeared in the film Legally Blonde as Bruiser Woods, the canine companion of Elle Woods (portrayed by Witherspoon). In 2003, at the age of 5, he reprised his role as Bruiser in the film's sequel, Legally Blonde 2: Red, White & Blonde, in which Gidget portrayed Bruiser's mother. Both dogs belonged to Studio Animal Services.

Following the Legally Blonde movies, Moonie continued to book acting jobs. He appeared in a music video alongside the singer and actress Cher, starred in several commercials, and had guest roles in episodes of the television series Three Sisters and Providence.

He was present when Reese Witherspoon received her star on the Hollywood Walk of Fame in December 2010.

Moonie retired from acting in 2014 at the age of 15.

== Death ==
On March 10, 2016, Moonie died in Los Angeles, California, at the age of 18. Chipperton announced his death in an Instagram post the same day, in addition to numerous major media outlets that reported on his death.

== See also ==
- List of individual dogs
