= Legally Blonde (novel) =

2001 novel by Amanda Brown

- First edition cover
- Author: Amanda Brown
- Language: English
- Genre: Comedy
- Publisher: AuthorHouse
- Publication date: 2001 (self-published), 2003 (official publication)
- Publication place: United States
- Pages: 185
- ISBN: 978-0-75964-018-4
- OCLC: 47926797

Legally Blonde is a 2001 comic novel by American author Amanda Brown, with a copyright credit also going to Brigid (Bridget) Kerrigan.

The novel was the basis of the 2001 film of the same name which starred Reese Witherspoon and its 2003 sequel Legally Blonde 2: Red, White & Blonde, and spawned an eponymous franchise, including the 2007 musical Legally Blonde, the 2009 direct-to-video film Legally Blondes, and a prequel TV series Elle.

The novel was based on Brown's experiences while enrolled in Stanford Law School.

Legally Blonde also spawned a young adult novels series featuring a teenage Elle Woods during her high school years written by Natalie Standiford, all published in 2006 by Little, Brown and Company

== Plot ==
Elle Woods, a blonde University of Southern California sorority president and homecoming queen, is deeply in love with her college sweetheart, Warner Huntington III. When Warner enrolls in Harvard Law School and aims to find a girl more serious than Elle to be his bride, Elle schemes a plan to follow him there to win him back.
