= Legally Blondes =

2009 film by Savage Steve Holland

- DVD cover
- Directed by: Savage Steve Holland
- Written by: Chad Gomez Creasey; Dara Resnik Creasey
- Based on: Characters by Amanda Brown
- Produced by: Sara Berrisford; Craig Roesseler; Hudson Hickman; David Brookwell; Sean McNamara; David Buelow; Reese Witherspoon; Jennifer Simpson; David Grace; Marc Platt
- Starring: Milly and Becky Rosso; Lisa Banes; Christopher Cousins; Brittany Curran
- Cinematography: Bill Barber
- Edited by: Cindy Parisotto; Anthony Markward
- Music by: John Coda
- Production companies: Metro-Goldwyn-Mayer; Marc Platt Productions; Type A Films; Brookwell McNamara Entertainment
- Distributed by: 20th Century Fox Home Entertainment
- Release date: April 28, 2009
- Running time: 82 minutes
- Country: United States
- Language: English

Legally Blondes is a 2009 American teen comedy film directed by Savage Steve Holland. It is a spin-off film and the third installment of the Legally Blonde franchise. The film stars Milly and Becky Rosso as Elle Woods's British twin cousins, while Reese Witherspoon, who played Woods in the previous films, serves as a producer.

It was released on DVD on April 28, 2009, by 20th Century Fox Home Entertainment, followed by a television premiere on August 2, 2009, on ABC Family.

== Plot ==
British twin sisters Izzy and Annie Woods move in with their cousin Elle Woods in Southern California after Elle becomes a successful lobbyist and moves to Washington, D.C. (Note: As depicted in Legally Blonde 2: Red, White & Blonde (2003)) Awaiting the girls are a pair of chihuahua dogs who are the nephews of Bruiser, Elle's chihuahua. The twins are dismayed to learn that they will be attending Pacific Preparatory (Pac Prep), Elle's alma mater, a private school that requires uniforms.

The twins meet Chris Lopez, a scholarship student who is smitten with Annie, and Tiffany Donohugh, the spoiled daughter of a wealthy donor of Pac Prep. Tiffany pretends to befriend them but later reveals to their classmates that the twins are attending Pac Prep on a partial scholarship, embarrassing them. Izzy and Annie then form friendships with other scholarship students, and they all begin making ways to change Pac Prep's culture. Izzy also tries to help Chris get closer to Annie.

Chris and Izzy are later accused of cheating on a history test and set out to prove their innocence. After learning that Justin Whitley, Tiffany's boyfriend, has access to a master key that opens all doors in the school and that Tiffany has a master passcode that grants access to all of the school's computers (which had been donated by her father), the twins suspect that the two framed them by gaining access to the test answers on their teacher's computer.

While defending herself in student court, Izzy is locked in the bathroom by Justin, forcing Annie to overcome her fear of public speaking and impersonate her. As Izzy returns, Annie must continue making her case while impersonating her sister to keep up the ruse. As Annie finishes her summation of Tiffany and Justin's plot, supporters of the twins click their pens to anger Justin, who is irritated by the sound. Out of rage, Justin admits to framing Chris and Izzy on Tiffany's behalf. Tiffany admits to masterminding everything but claims that she cannot be punished because of her family's status as founders and long-time donors of the school. Despite this, headmistress Elsa Higgins expels both Justin and Tiffany and claims that she has her eye on Izzy and Annie.

In the end, Annie and Chris share a dance and Izzy does the same with Brad, a scholarship student who had assisted the twins in student court. The twins and their friends become popular at the school, while Tiffany and Justin are cut off from their families' wealth and sent to public school, though Ashley Meadows, Tiffany's friend, swears revenge.

== Cast ==
- Milly Rosso as Annabelle "Annie" Woods
- Becky Rosso as Isabelle "Izzy" Woods
- Lisa Banes as Headmistress Elsa Higgins
- Christopher Cousins as Mr. Richard Woods
- Brittany Curran as Tiffany Donohugh
- Curtis Armstrong as Mr. Gary Golden
- Rose Abdoo as Sylvia
- Bobby Campo as Christopher Lopez
- Chad Broskey as Justin Whitley
- Chloe Bridges as Ashley Meadows
- Amy Hill as Ms. Chang
- Kunal Sharma as Vivek
- Christoph Sanders as Brad Wellington
- Tanya Chisholm as Marcie
- Teo Olivares as Rainbow

== Reception ==
On Rotten Tomatoes, the film has a 37% rating based on two reviews.

Kelly West of CinemaBlend rated the film three out of five stars and wrote, "Like so many other movies ABC Family unleashes, this one is pretty predictable and nothing that'll really move you emotionally but it does have its moments." David Nusair of Reel Film Reviews gave the film one out of four stars, calling it "[a]s ineffective as direct-to-video sequels come" and "never quite able to justify its very existence." David Cornelius of DVD Talk stated that the film "reimagines the franchise in the tone of a Disney Channel sitcom", while criticizing Savage Steve Holland's direction, as well as "the cheap production values, sloppy editing, and [...] that morally questionable screenplay".
