= Legally Blonde =

2001 film by Robert Luketic

- Theatrical release poster
- Directed by: Robert Luketic
- Screenplay by: Karen McCullah Lutz; Kirsten Smith
- Based on: Legally Blonde by Amanda Brown
- Produced by: Marc Platt; Ric Kidney
- Starring: Reese Witherspoon; Luke Wilson; Selma Blair; Matthew Davis; Victor Garber; Jennifer Coolidge
- Cinematography: Anthony B. Richmond
- Edited by: Anita Brandt-Burgoyne
- Music by: Rolfe Kent
- Production companies: Metro-Goldwyn-Mayer; Marc Platt Productions
- Distributed by: MGM Distribution Co. (North America); 20th Century Fox (International)
- Release date: July 13, 2001
- Running time: 96 minutes
- Country: United States
- Language: English
- Budget: $18 million
- Box office: $142 million

Legally Blonde is a 2001 American comedy film directed by Robert Luketic and written by Karen McCullah Lutz and Kirsten Smith. Based on Amanda Brown's novel, it stars Reese Witherspoon, Luke Wilson, Selma Blair, Matthew Davis, Victor Garber, and Jennifer Coolidge. The story follows Elle Woods (Witherspoon), a sorority girl who attempts to win back her ex-boyfriend Warner Huntington III (Davis) by getting a Juris Doctor degree at Harvard Law School and, in the process, overcomes stereotypes against blondes and triumphs as a successful lawyer.

The outline of Legally Blonde originated from Brown's experiences as a blonde going to Stanford Law School while being obsessed with fashion and beauty, reading Elle magazine, and frequently clashing with the personalities of her peers. In 2000, Brown met producer Marc Platt, who helped her develop her manuscript into a novel. Platt brought in screenwriters McCullah Lutz and Smith to adapt the book into a motion picture. The project caught the attention of Luketic, an Australian director new to Hollywood.

The film was released by MGM Distribution Co. in North America on July 13, 2001, with 20th Century Fox releasing in other territories, and was a hit with audiences, grossing $142 million worldwide on an $18 million budget, as well as receiving positive reviews from critics, with praise for Witherspoon's performance in particular. It was nominated for a Golden Globe Award for Best Motion Picture: Musical or Comedy. Witherspoon received a Golden Globe nomination for Best Actress – Motion Picture Musical or Comedy, and the 2002 MTV Movie Award for Best Female Performance.

A sequel, Legally Blonde 2: Red, White & Blonde, was released in 2003, while another sequel was announced to be in development in 2018 and reiterated yet again in the summer of 2026 by Reese Witherspoon. Legally Blonde also spawned a media franchise with various adaptations, including a stage musical, which premiered on Broadway in 2007, a direct-to-video spin-off, Legally Blondes, released in 2009, and a prequel television series about Woods's high school years, Elle, which premiered in 2026 on Amazon Prime Video.

== Plot ==
California University of Los Angeles sorority president Elle Woods is taken to a restaurant by her boyfriend, Warner Huntington III. She expects a proposal, but he breaks up with her instead. Intending to become a successful senator, he believes Elle is not "serious" enough for that life. He tells her that his family has five generations of U.S. Senators and that his brother, a student at Yale Law School, is engaged to a woman from the Vanderbilt family.

Elle assumes she can win Warner back by achieving the same things. After months of studying, Elle scores a near-perfect 179 on the LSAT. With that and her 4.0 GPA, she is accepted to Harvard Law School, which Warner will also attend.

During the first semester, Elle discovers that her personality completely contrasts with those of her distrusting East Coast classmates. Elle learns of Warner's engagement to his previous girlfriend, Vivian Kensington, and befriends local manicurist Paulette Bonafonté. Later, as Elle tells Warner she intends to apply for one of her professor's internships, he says she is not smart enough. Realizing that Warner will neither take her back nor take her seriously, Elle determines to demonstrate her understanding of the subject.

The following semester, Harvard's most respected teacher, Aaron Callahan, hires some first-year interns, including Elle, Warner, and Vivian, to assist in a high-profile case. It involves prominent fitness instructor Brooke Windham, one of Elle's role models and a fellow alumna of her sorority. Accused of murdering her husband, Brooke is unwilling to publicly reveal her alibi.

However, Brooke tells Elle in confidence she was secretly having liposuction at the time, which Elle promises not to disclose. Vivian gains new respect for Elle when she refuses to betray Brooke and divulge the alibi to Callahan. Emmett Richmond, Callahan's junior partner, recognizes Elle's potential.

Callahan attempts to seduce Elle, who assumes that is why he recruited her. She briefly quits in disgust and tells Emmett what happened. After learning of Callahan's behavior, Brooke replaces him with Elle under Emmett's guidance, as law students may act in court under the supervision of a licensed attorney.

While cross-examining Brooke's stepdaughter Chutney, Elle eventually discovers a significant inconsistency in her story: Chutney testified she was home during her father's murder but did not hear the gunshot because she was in the shower after getting her hair permed that morning. Elle explains washing permed hair within the first 24 hours would deactivate the ammonium thioglycolate, pointing out Chutney's curls are still intact. Chutney admits her frustration at having a stepmother her own age, inadvertently confessing she shot her father after mistaking him for Brooke.

With Brooke exonerated, the media hail Elle's involvement. Warner asks Elle to take him back since she has proven herself, but she rejects him, realizing he is shallow and a "complete bonehead". However, she and Vivian become best friends, especially after Vivian dumps Warner. Elle gives the graduation speech two years later, while Warner graduates with no honors, job offers, or girlfriend. Emmett has started his law firm, with plans to propose to Elle later that night.

== Cast ==
- Reese Witherspoon as Elle Woods
- Luke Wilson as Emmett Richmond
- Selma Blair as Vivian Kensington
- Matthew Davis as Warner Huntington III
- Victor Garber as Professor Aaron Callahan
- Jennifer Coolidge as Paulette Bonafonté
- Holland Taylor as Professor Elspeth Stromwell
- Ali Larter as Brooke Taylor-Windham
- Jessica Cauffiel as Margot Chapman
- Alanna Ubach as Serena McGuire
- Oz Perkins as David Kidney
- Linda Cardellini as Chutney Windham
- Bruce Thomas as UPS Guy
- Meredith Scott Lynn as Enid Wexler
- Raquel Welch as Mrs Windham-Vandermark
- Francesca P. Roberts as Judge Marina R. Bickford
- Wayne Federman as Harvard Admissions Counselor
- Kimberly McCullough as Amy
- Greg Serano as Enrique Salvatore
- John Kapelos as Dewey Newcombe
- Allyce Beasley as CULA Advisor
- Moondoggie as Bruiser Woods

== Production ==
=== Background ===
"I wrote it all on pink paper, with my pink furry pen. I finally found an agent who picked it up out of a slush pile because it was on pink paper. It went out to studios and publishing houses the same day, and overnight there was a bidding war. MGM bought it. But it was rejected by everybody on the publishing side."
— Amanda Brown

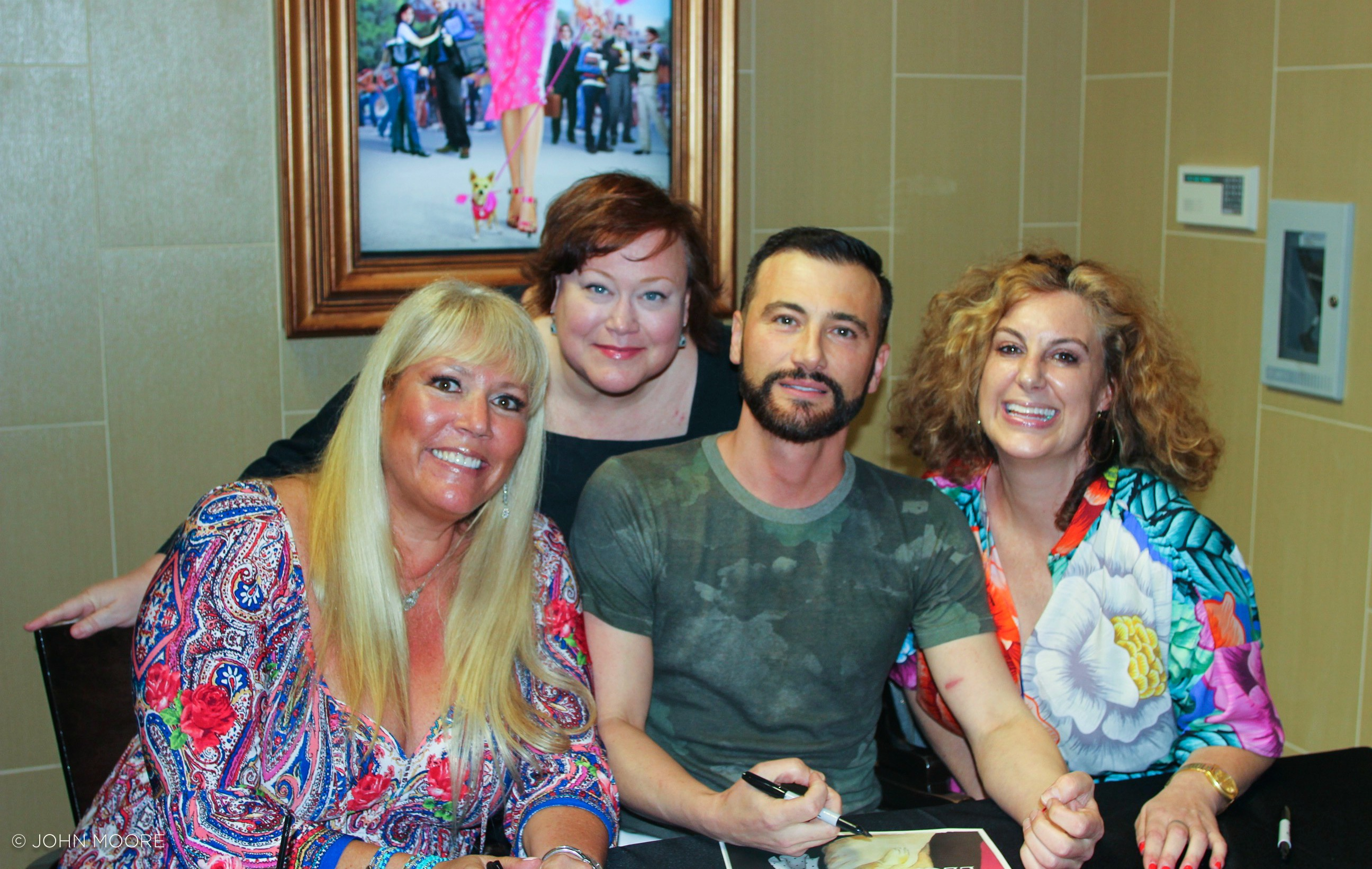
Karen McCullah Lutz, Robert Luketic and Kirsten Smith pose with a fan at a screening of Legally Blonde in 2016.

Amanda Brown published Legally Blonde in 2001, basing it upon her real life experiences as a blonde attending Stanford Law School, while being obsessed with fashion and beauty, reading Elle magazine, and frequently clashing with the personalities of her peers.

Brown said that when she first arrived at Stanford, she discovered she had made a big mistake. "I was in my first week of law school, in 1993, and I saw this flyer for "The Women of Stanford Law", so I was like, 'I'll go and meet some nice girls. Whatever.' I went to the meeting, and these were not women. These were really angry people. The woman who was leading it spent three years at Stanford trying to change the name 'semester' to 'ovester.' I started laughing and I realized everyone in the room took it very seriously. So I didn't make any friends there."

Brown wrote letters to her parents about these experiences and originally thought about writing a book of essays about her law school experience until a literary agent advised her to adapt them into a novel. Brown took a community college writing class, put together a manuscript, and shopped the book around but was unsuccessful. She later resubmitted her manuscript again, this time in pink, which got the attention of an agent, and "movie people went nuts." Amanda's mother, Suzanne, remembers the day of the bidding war and thought she would be lucky to get $10,000 but the final figure was considerably more.

Producer Marc Platt was intrigued by the character of Elle Woods when an unpublished novel manuscript was delivered to him. "What I loved about this story is that it's hilarious, it's sexy and, at the same time, it's empowering," says Platt. "The world looks at Elle and sees someone who is blonde and beautiful but nothing more. Elle, on the other hand, doesn't judge herself or anybody else. She thinks the world's great, she's great, everyone's great and nothing can change that. She's truly an irrepressible modern heroine."

Screenwriters Karen McCullah Lutz and Kirsten Smith spent two days on Stanford's campus in the spring of 2000 doing research for their screenplay based on Brown's novel. Director Robert Luketic, an Australian newcomer who came to Hollywood on the success of his quirky debut short film Titsiana Booberini, was drawn to the project while looking for a breakthrough film. "I had been reading scripts for two years, not finding anything I could put my own personal mark on, until Legally Blonde came around," Luketic said.

=== Development ===
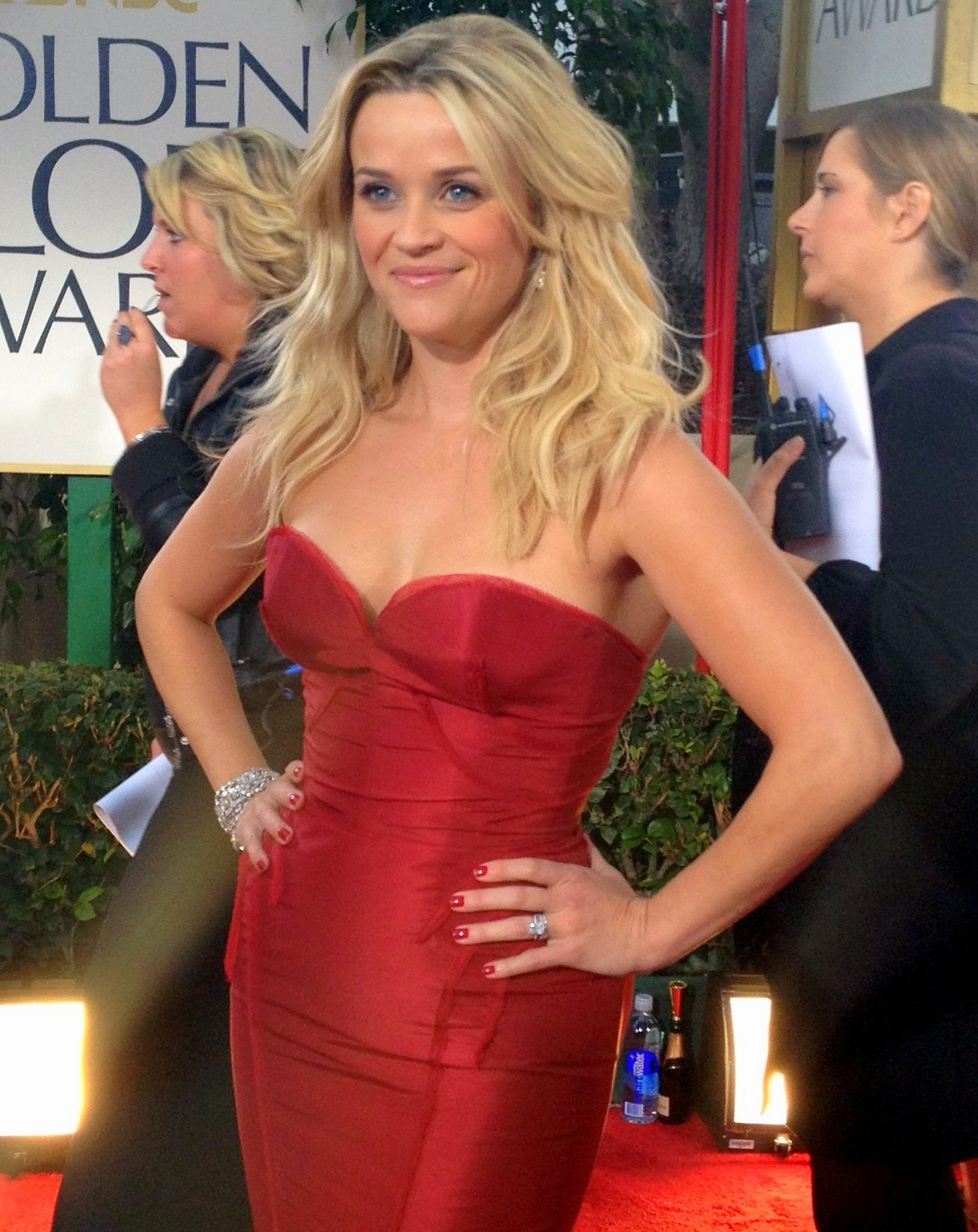
Witherspoon (pictured in 2012) was Luketic's first choice to play Elle Woods, but she needed to audition multiple times to convince Metro-Goldwyn-Mayer.

Luketic explained that when the studio first green-lit the project, they were not aware that the film would be structured as a progressively feel-good, women's empowerment movie. "Initially, they thought it was going to be much more wet T-shirts and boobs than it actually turned out to be", said Luketic. The first script for Legally Blonde was edgy and raunchy in a similar vein to American Pie. The murder trial was not part of the plot and the film ended with Elle getting into a relationship with a professor. "It transformed from nonstop zingers that were very adult in nature to this universal story of overcoming adversity by being oneself," said Smith. When it was decided to change the film's plot, McCullah and Smith finessed some details and added a few characters, like Paulette.

Charlize Theron, Gwyneth Paltrow, Alicia Silverstone, Katherine Heigl, Christina Applegate, Milla Jovovich and Jennifer Love Hewitt were all considered for the lead role but Luketic said he "knew on page five of the script that [he] wanted Reese to play Elle". "I wanted someone with gravitas and brains," he explained. "There had to be more behind the face, and Reese just fit the bill". Witherspoon was the first person who read the script, and it was not sent to any other actresses; casting director Joseph Middleton had also previously worked with Witherspoon in The Man in the Moon and A Far Off Place, so he strongly believed in her for the role when Platt brought up Witherspoon's name. Applegate turned down the role as she felt it would be too similar to Married... with Children and afraid of repeating herself, a decision she would later regret calling it "a stupid move". Platt suggested at one point to cast Britney Spears, but McCullah convinced him to not cast Spears after her Saturday Night Live (SNL) appearance. Despite Luketic's enthusiasm for Witherspoon to be cast as the lead, Metro-Goldwyn-Mayer (MGM) was not convinced. Witherspoon's performance as Tracy Flick in Election put her at risk of being typecast by the studio heads. "They thought I was a shrew," Witherspoon told The Hollywood Reporter. Witherspoon had been passed over for several other post-Election roles. "My manager finally called and said, 'You've got to go meet with the studio head because he will not approve you. He thinks you really are your character from Election and that you're repellent.' And then I was told to dress sexy." Witherspoon went through several rounds of auditions for the part, even meeting with executives in character with a Southern California accent. "I remember a room full of men who were asking me questions about being a coed and being in a sorority," Witherspoon recalled. "Even though I had dropped out of college four years earlier and I have never been inside a sorority house." Luketic remembered meeting with her to discuss how she'd approach the role. "We met at a hotel on Sunset Boulevard and discussed the film ... we were both concerned about some aspects, like how can the audience feel sorry for a rich girl driving a Porsche; and she had to dress in a very particular way that wasn't distracting or off-putting ... And every decision came from a certain innocence [of the character]."

Jennifer Coolidge was cast as Elle's manicurist friend Paulette, a role which Courtney Love and Kathy Najimy had also been considered for, according to some rumors Coolidge heard. For the role of Warner's new girlfriend Vivian, Smith suggested casting Chloë Sevigny. This suggestion did not work out, so Selma Blair was cast instead; Blair and Witherspoon had previously been together in Cruel Intentions, allowing their friendship to be an anchor between their characters. Ali Larter originally wanted to play one of Elle's sorority sisters, but upon reading the script, she fell in love with the character of Brooke Taylor Windham, the fitness instructor on trial for murder.

The screenwriters envisioned Luke Wilson as they were coming up with Elle's love interest Emmett Richmond. "They auditioned a bunch of other guys and we're like, 'How about auditioning Luke Wilson for the Luke Wilson role?'" McCullah Lutz said. Middleton desired to cast Paul Bettany as Emmett, but the crew felt that the character should be American whereas Bettany is British.

The final product came after "something like 10 drafts of the script. I worked with the writers (Kirsten Smith, Karen McCullah Lutz, working from Amanda Brown's novel) who stayed on after we started shooting," Luketic explained. "And we'd have re-thinks and re-writes, often in the middle of the night." An unused idea for the finished film included having a cameo appearance of Judge Judy during Elle's Harvard video essay in which Elle and her friends chased down the show's host, but the scene was cut when Judge Judy Sheindlin could not get on board. Alanna Ubach suggested instead to cast Witherspoon's then-husband Ryan Phillippe for the part, rewritten as a male character, but Witherspoon did not feel the idea would play out.

Witherspoon researched the character by studying sorority girls on their campuses and associated hot spots. She went to dinner with them and joked she was conducting an "anthropological study". "I could have gone into this and been really ditsy and played what I would have thought this character was, and I would have missed a whole other side of her," Witherspoon added. "But by going down to Beverly Hills, hanging out in Neiman Marcus, eating in their cafe and seeing how these women walk and speak, I got into the reality of the character. I saw how polite these women are, and I saw how much they value their female friendships and how important it is to support each other".

The cast and crew also did a lot of research, with McCullah and Smith visiting the Stanford Law School for a week during orientation time; a scene of a group composed of new students going around in a circle was inspired on law students the screenwriters eavesdropped during their visit. They also sat for the criminal law and constitutional law classes; McCullah particularly got bored during the second class despite finding the first interesting, but this inspired her to write some scenes during that class.

Reese Witherspoon said in an interview regarding her character:

You see so many beautiful people in this world, especially in the world that I live in and a lot of your first instincts is to discount women who put a lot of effort into their looks as maybe not serious about their job or maybe not serious about their relationships ... I think everyone naturally jumps to those conclusions ... I was interested in exploring the difference between [the way] someone looks and how people perceive them and how they really are. I'm not necessarily perky and bubbly all the time, so it's been a lot of effort to stay up and the amount of care and energy she puts into a lot things has really been a challenge for me and trying to convey that lightness all the time is hard work.

=== Costume design ===
"The catch phrase was: "What would Elle do?" How would a fashion-obsessed, fish out of water assimilate into Harvard and a law firm without compromising her personal style? So, I took each situation and interpreted what would be appropriate in a unique way. Driving to Harvard? A leather driving suit. First day at the law office? A riff on a 1940s romantic comedy, pencil skirt and ruffle blues, but in the greys, this time. Things like that."
— Sophie de Rakoff

The film's costume designer, Sophie De Rakoff, became fast friends with Witherspoon on the set, bonding over Dolly Parton. "It was that simple. We just liked each other, and geeked out on Dolly," De Rakoff said. The dominant color palette for Elle's outfits in the film is pink. "The backstory is, Reese and I, and maybe the production designers, went to visit some sororities [in downtown Los Angeles]. We knew that she needed a signature color, and we were like, 'Do we really want it to be pink? It's so on the nose. It's so feminine. Could we do lavender? Could we do light blue? Is there another color that we could do?' When we met all the sorority girls, it had to be pink."

Witherspoon sported 40 different hairstyles in the film. "Oh my God, it became known as 'The Hair That Ate Hollywood,'" Luketic said. "It became all about the hair. I have this obsession with flyaways. It would annoy Reese a little bit because I would always have hairdressers in her face. But really the most time and research and testing on the set went into getting the color right, because 'blonde' is subject to interpretation, I found."

=== Filming ===
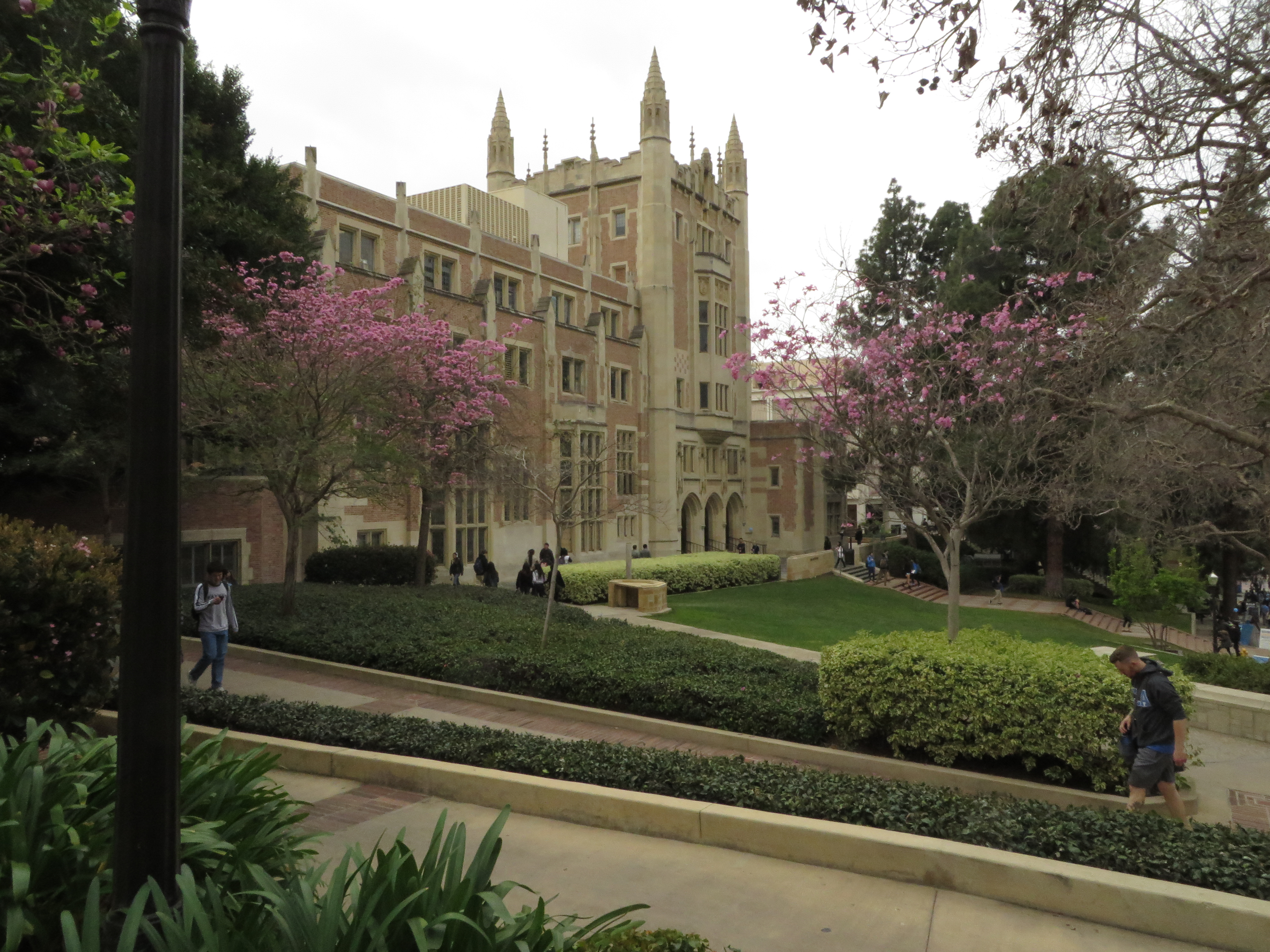
The front lawn of UCLA's Kerckhoff Hall, as seen during the orientation scene in Legally Blonde

Luketic said he was "terrified" on his first day of filming. "I come from making a ten-minute short with a crew of ten people to a crew of 200 and having enough trucks and trailers to wrap around a city block."

Both the University of Southern California and Stanford refused to allow the producers to use their college names in the film. "[The producers of the film] asked if they could set the film at USC, but the images of her as an undergraduate and being in a sorority ... we felt there was too much stereotyping going on," says Elijah May, campus filming coordinator at USC. The production settled on having Elle go to a fictional college called CULA.

Although the film was primarily set at Harvard University, campus scenes were filmed at USC, University of California, Los Angeles, California Institute of Technology, and Rose City High School in Pasadena, California. Principal production lasted from October to December 2000.

The "bend and snap" scene – where Elle explains to Paulette how to get her crush's attention – almost did not make it into the movie. "[Producer] Marc Platt wanted a B plot for Paulette (Jennifer Coolidge)," McCullah Lutz told Entertainment Weekly. "At first we were like, 'Should the store be robbed?'" Co-writer Kirsten Smith observed, "I think we spent a week or two trying to figure out what the B plot and this big set piece should be. There were crime plots. We were pitching scene after scene and it all felt very tonally weird".

Later, while brainstorming at a bar in Los Angeles, McCullah Lutz came up with a solution: "What if Elle shows [Paulette] a move so she can get the UPS guy?" On the spur of the moment, Smith invented a move, standing up and demonstrating what would become the bend and snap. Smith explains, "It was a spontaneous invention. It was a completely drunken moment in a bar." Director Robert Luketic later adapted the "bend and snap" move into a dance number for the film.

"It was a fully choreographed number by Toni Basil, and she was awesome," Witherspoon recalls. "She did the whole dance." "I remember just reading it and thinking it was the most hysterical thing ever," she added. "That is still the most asked request I get from people. Even this past year, when I have been giving speeches or talking about whatever, they always ask me, 'Will you do the bend and snap?' I have a feeling I will be doing the bend and snap until I am 95". While filming the courthouse scenes, Raquel Welch requested cinematographer Anthony B. Richmond special lighting for her scenes as Mrs. Windham Vandermark due to her obsession with light and dressed on her own accord to look better.

The film originally ended at the courthouse right after Woods won the case, with Elle on the courthouse steps sharing a victory kiss with Emmett, then cutting one year into the future to her and a now-blonde Vivian starting their own Blonde Legal Defense Club at law school. After test audiences revealed they did not like this ending, McCullah Lutz and Smith consulted with Luketic, Platt and other members of the production team while still in the lobby of the movie theater and they all agreed a new conclusion was necessary. "It was just kind of a weak ending," explained screenwriter McCullah Lutz. "The kiss didn't feel right because it's not a rom-com — it wasn't about their relationship. So test audiences were saying, 'We want to see what happens — we want to see her succeed.' So that's why we rewrote for graduation". Ubach and Jessica Cauffiel claim that the original ending also included Elle and Vivian drinking margaritas in Hawaii, with the implication that they were either now best friends or involved romantically although Smith and McCullah never wrote such ending. Other endings proposed for the film included a musical number in which Elle, the judge, the jury and everyone in the courthouse broke into singing and dancing.

The screenwriters wrote a new ending taking place at graduation, which was filmed at Dulwich College in London, England since Witherspoon was in that city filming The Importance of Being Earnest. Witherspoon had also cut her hair for that film and Wilson had shaved his head for The Royal Tenenbaums. As both actors had changed their hair for their next movies, each had to wear wigs for the scene.

== Reception ==
=== Box office ===
Legally Blonde was released on July 13, 2001, in North America. Its opening weekend gross of $20 million made it a sleeper hit for the struggling MGM studio, and it went on to gross $96.5 million in North America and $45.2 million elsewhere, for a worldwide total of $142 million. The film was released in the United Kingdom on October 26, 2001, and opened on No. 2, behind American Pie 2.

=== Critical response ===
On Rotten Tomatoes, Legally Blonde has an approval rating of 75% based on reviews from 203 critics. The site's consensus reads, "Though the material is predictable and formulaic, Reese Witherspoon's funny, nuanced performance makes this movie better than it would have been otherwise." On Metacritic, the film has a score of 59 out of 100, based on 32 reviews, indicating "mixed or average" reviews. Audiences surveyed by CinemaScore gave the film a grade "A−" on scale of A to F.

Roger Ebert gave it three out of four stars, saying the film was "impossible to dislike" and "Witherspoon effortlessly animated this material with sunshine and quick wit." Todd McCarthy of Variety said Witherspoon gave a "wonderful and winning" performance. "Beaming star wattage out of every pore, not to mention her hair, Witherspoon once again proves herself a comedienne worthy of comparison to such golden era greats as Carole Lombard and Ginger Rogers." Michael Wilmington of Chicago Tribune also commended Witherspoon's performance, saying her "comic timing [is] immaculate, her persona irresistible. But it's her spirit and immersion in the part that really infuse the whole film and make it work." He added that Witherspoon [pours] "so much humor and pizazz into Elle that she lifts up the whole movie." B. Ruby Rich of The Nation called it "the best empowerment movie for teenage girls to come along in ages." CNN's Paul Clinton lauded the film as a "sassy satire that retains a message: believe in yourself and follow your dreams."

Others were more critical of the film and its screenplay. Kirk Honeycutt of The Hollywood Reporter described the film as "predictable, cutesy and surprisingly short on genuine humor" but "still gets by thanks to the magnetic presence of Witherspoon." Michael O'Sullivan of The Washington Post called the movie a "Clueless redux but without the edgy, knowing wit." Jessica Winter of The Village Voice panned the film as a "junk-food movie striving to be nutritious." "It's one of your racier Be Yourself after-school specials crossed with Who Moved My Cheese? for Cosmo girls," Winter asserted.

=== Legal accuracy ===
Legally Blonde has received mixed reviews among legal scholars for its depiction of law school and the accuracy of its application of the law. Devin Stone, better known online as LegalEagle, a YouTuber and American lawyer, observed that the application process portrayed in the movie in which Elle Woods sent the Harvard Law School admissions board a video essay was not possible. "There's no way to upload that on the law school application system," Stone noted. "During orientation, Harvard Law School actually played the clip of Elle's admissions video with the admissions committee deciding to let her in, and then they swore that's not how they made decisions," explained Jameyanne Fuller, a student at Harvard Law School. Certain elements of law school are also omitted from the film. "The movie totally skipped first semester exams which is like the most stressful time in law school ever," said Fuller.

Stone said Woods had no authority to act as a lawyer when she represented Paulette Bonafonté over custody of her dog from her ex-husband and called her conduct a "huge ethical violation." "She hasn't finished law school, she's never passed the bar and she has absolutely no right to call herself an attorney," Stone observed. "That's called the unauthorized practice of law. If anyone finds out that she committed this ... while she was at Harvard Law School, she'd probably be barred from entering the bar in virtually any state in the United States." Unauthorized practice of law in Massachusetts carries a fine of $100 or imprisonment for not more than six months.

Contrary to what is shown in the film, Woods would not be able to question a witness on the stand during a criminal trial, according to W. Bradley Wendel, a law professor at Cornell Law School. The film cites Massachusetts Supreme Judicial Court Rule 3.03 as precedent for Woods being able to represent a client while under the supervision of a licensed attorney, but the ruling only applies to third-year law students.

There are however also multiple points where the movie is deemed to be accurate. For example, the requirements one needs to have to get into Harvard, the LSAT studying, LSAT level needed and the importance of LSAT in getting into Harvard are deemed accurate, as well as teaching methods used in the legal studies shown.

=== Accolades ===
Year	Award	Category	Recipient	Result
2001	Teen Choice Awards	Choice Summer Movie		Won
2002	Golden Globe Awards	Golden Globe for Best Picture – Musical or Comedy		Nominated
2002	Golden Globe Awards	Golden Globe for Best Actress – Musical or Comedy	Reese Witherspoon	Nominated
2002	MTV Movie Awards	Best Movie		Nominated
2002	MTV Movie Awards	Best Female Performance	Reese Witherspoon	Nominated
2002	MTV Movie Awards	Best Comedic Performance	Reese Witherspoon	Won
2002	MTV Movie Awards	Best Line	Reese Witherspoon	Won
2002	MTV Movie Awards	Best Dressed	Reese Witherspoon	Won
2002	Satellite Awards	Satellite Award for Best Actress – Motion Picture	Reese Witherspoon	Nominated
2002	Satellite Awards	Satellite Award for Best Original Score	Rolfe Kent	Nominated
2002	BMI Awards	BMI Film Music Award	Rolfe Kent	Won

=== Legacy ===
More than twenty years later, the film continues to inspire generations of filmgoers, many of them women who went on to become prospective law students. "At least once a week, I have a woman come up to me and say, 'I went to law school because of Legally Blonde,'" Witherspoon said. "It's incredible ... You can be unapologetically feminine but also smart and driven." "When I saw the movie I just felt it gave me like a real surge of motivation because I really identified with her," Layla Summers, a family law attorney, told Spectrum News. "I think the movie is still very relevant," she added. "Just being a girl and being a woman, the odds are stacked against you still ... When I watch the movie now I feel like I'm part of a great club of powerful professional women, like a sorority."

"When I got to law school, on the toughest days, I would pop in the movie and get a good laugh," Shalyn Smith, a California law student and sorority president, said in an interview with People magazine. "Elle embodies fighting for what is right, staying true to yourself, and defeating the odds. It's crazy that one movie can do that, you know?" Entertainment reporter Lucy Ford revealed to Witherspoon during an interview in 2018 that she had written her college dissertation on the film and presented her a pink-ribbon bound copy.

In 2021, Writers Guild of America West (WGAW) and Writers Guild of America, East (WGAE) included its screenplay in WGA's 101 Greatest Screenplays of the 21st Century (So Far). In 2025, it was one of the films voted for the "Readers' Choice" edition of The New York Times' list of "The 100 Best Movies of the 21st Century", finishing at number 179.

== Soundtrack ==
The Legally Blonde soundtrack includes music from Vanessa Carlton, Samantha Mumba, Superchick, and Hoku, who sings the opening song, "Perfect Day".

"No one really knew that Legally Blonde was going to be what it was, Literally, [my label heads] were like, 'This movie's not going to become anything.' And then the next thing you know, it's like, this iconic movie. And my song opens it!" Hoku said in an interview with Billboard. "Sitting in the premiere and hearing my song open the movie, and everyone's cheering – it felt like, 'I've really arrived now, folks.'"

The soundtrack album was released July 10, 2001, by A&M Records.

== Franchise ==
The success of the film spawned a sequel, Legally Blonde 2: Red, White & Blonde, a musical, one straight-to-home video release starring British twins Camilla and Rebecca Rosso, Legally Blondes, and a Prime Video prequel series Elle.

=== Musical ===
In April 2007, a musical adaptation premiered on Broadway to mixed reviews, starring Laura Bell Bundy as Elle, Christian Borle as Emmett, Orfeh as Paulette, Nikki Snelson as Brooke, Richard H. Blake as Warner, Kate Shindle as Vivienne, and Michael Rupert as Callahan, running until October 19, 2008. The show, Bundy, Borle, and Orfeh were all nominated for Tony Awards. Later, the Broadway show was the focus of an MTV reality-TV series called Legally Blonde: The Musical – The Search for Elle Woods, in which the winner would take over the role of Elle on Broadway. Bailey Hanks from Anderson, South Carolina, won the competition.

Legally Blonde also had a three-year run at the Savoy Theatre in London's West End, starring Sheridan Smith, Susan McFadden, and Carley Stenson as Elle, and Duncan James, Richard Fleeshman, Simon Thomas, and Ben Freeman as Warner. During its run, the cast also included Alex Gaumond, Denise Van Outen, and Lee Mead.
