= Amanda Brown (novelist) =

American novelist

- Born: October 6, 1970 (age 55); Phoenix, Arizona, U.S.
- Education: Arizona State University
- Occupation: Novelist
- Spouse: Justin Chang
- Children: 4
- Writing career
- Language: English
- Genre: Fiction

Amanda Brown Chang (born October 6, 1970) is an American novelist who wrote Legally Blonde, which was adapted into the 2001 film and 2007 musical.

== Biography ==
Amanda Brown was born in Phoenix, Arizona as the youngest of four siblings to Jack E. Brown, a lawyer, and Suzanne J. Brown, an art gallery owner. Brown graduated from Arizona State University in 1993. She then began attending Stanford Law School but did not finish her Juris Doctor degree. As a law student, she compiled letters and stories based on her experiences into a first manuscript that would become the novel Legally Blonde (published 2001).

Brown is married to financier Justin Chang, of Yale University and Harvard Business School. Their daughter, blogger and writer Alexandra Brown Chang, was born in 1999. The family divides their time between San Francisco and Malibu.

Following the success of the 2001 film, Brown released her second book, Family Trust (2003), which was also optioned for a film.

== Books ==
- Legally Blonde. AuthorHouse, 2001.
- Family Trust. New York: Dutton, 2003.
- School of Fortune, co-authored with Janice Weber. New York: St. Martin's Griffin, 2007.
