= Festivus (disambiguation) =

Festivus is a secular holiday occurring on December 23.

Festivus may also refer to:

- The Festivus, a seashell periodical
- Festivus Film Festival, a former film festival in Denver
- Mesonauta festivus, a species of South American cichlid fish

== See also ==
- Festivus Maximus or Super Bowl XXXV
- "The Strike" (Seinfeld), the 1997 episode of Seinfeld that introduced the holiday
