= Chaz Stevens =

American political activist (born 1964)

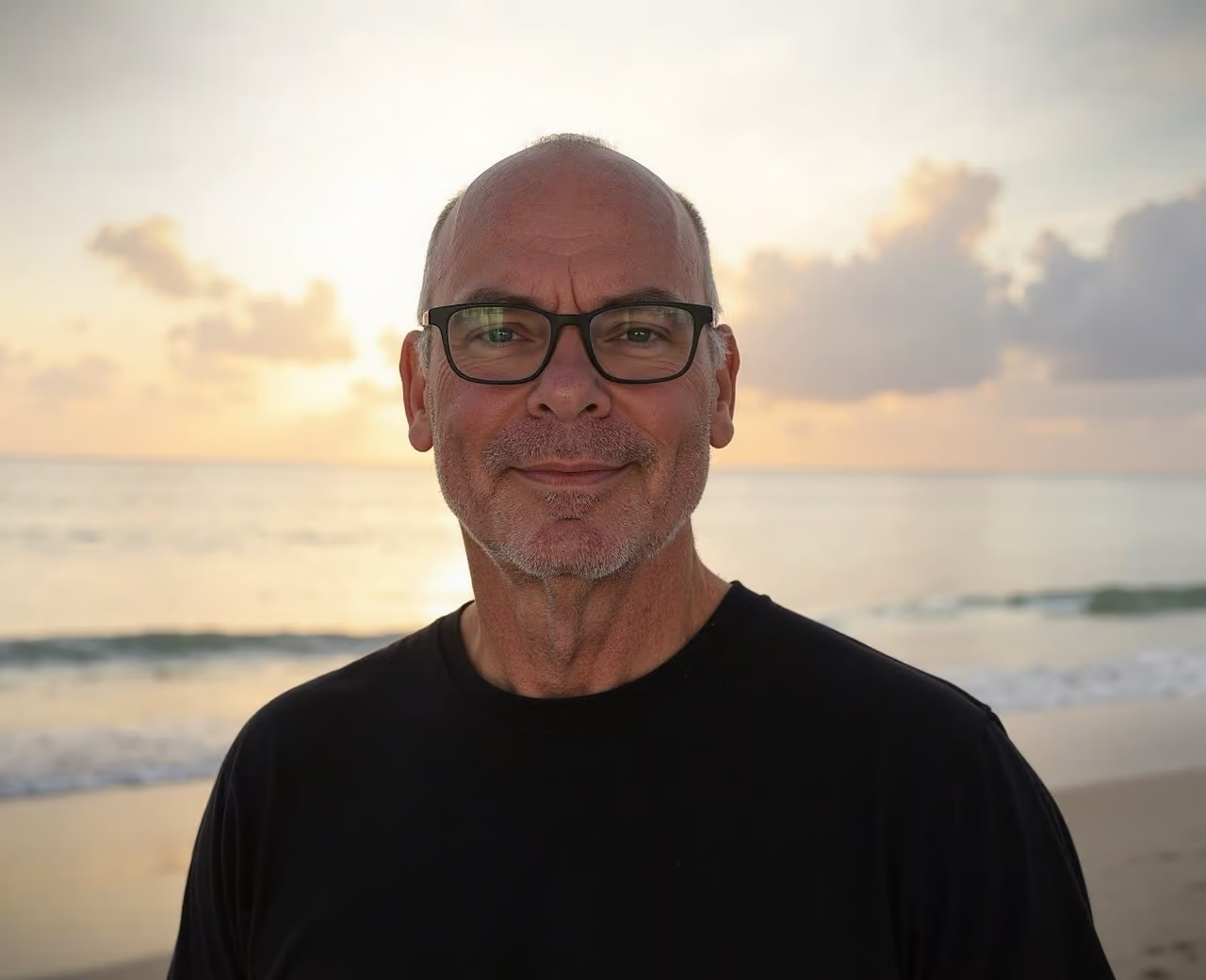
- Stevens in 2025
- Born: Timothy Stevens; August 31, 1964 (age 62); Newton, New Jersey, U.S.
- Education: Florida Tech
- Occupation: Activist
- Years active: 2004–present
- Notable work: Festivus poles

Timothy "Chaz" Stevens (born August 31, 1964) is an American political activist, artist, and blogger from Florida. He is active in local politics in Broward County, and is an advocate for the separation of church and state. His local political activity has led to charges being filed against several local politicians, including two mayors and a former mayor of his hometown, Deerfield Beach, Florida. Stevens's activism for the removal of religion from government has included placing Festivus poles in multiple Florida cities and six U.S. state capitols to contrast with holiday season religious displays on government property, and requests to deliver Satanic invocations when government meetings allow prayer or other religious invocations. In many cases this has led to the government agencies removing the targeted religious activities.

== Early life ==
Timothy Stevens was born on August 31, 1964, in Newton, New Jersey, to Beatrice Fowler, and James G. Stevens. He grew up in Fort Lauderdale, where his father was Vice-President of Human Resources at Holy Cross Hospital. Stevens is an atheist.

Stevens graduated Deerfield Beach High School in 1982, and earned a degree in applied mathematics from the Florida Institute of Technology, after which he worked as a computer programmer. He served as a technology product developer for IBM, Coca-Cola and Walt Disney World. He returned to Deerfield Beach, a Fort Lauderdale suburb, in 2003, and was living there when he took up political activism.

== Local activism ==
Stevens says that in 2004 he was watching a Deerfield Beach City Commission meeting on cable television and saw a commissioner vote on a pension plan for the city's firefighters, when her husband was a firefighter who would benefit from the vote. He put up street signs opposing the commissioner (that he had to remove and was fined for) and started a blog, MyActsOfSedition. On it, he criticized local politicians, often with obscenities.

In 2008, Stevens's complaints led to the arrests of the then-Deerfield Beach mayor and a city commissioner on corruption charges. This, and action urging authorities to investigate another Deerfield Beach commissioner, won him the New Times Broward-Palm Beach 2010 award for Best Gadfly.

In April 2010, Stevens was appointed to the board of the Deerfield Beach Housing Authority, by the commissioner, now mayor, whom he had originally criticized in 2004. His appointment met with dismay from others on the board (calling him "a vile and despicable person"). He resigned at the end of May, facing ouster after forwarding authority records to an auditor. He was reappointed in August 2011 for a period of only a few days, which ended when he made a racially charged remark about the Authority director. A month later the Housing Authority adopted, then rescinded, a resolution banning obscene, profane, or vulgar public records requests, which was considered to be targeted directly at him.

In 2011, following repeated complaints by Stevens since 2009, the other Deerfield Beach commissioner, who had also formerly served as mayor, vice-mayor, and county commissioner, surrendered to face five counts of falsifying business records related to a city loan to her brother. Seven months later she was convicted of four of the charges. When the charges were filed, Michael G. Kessler, head of the forensic accounting firm that had been hired to investigate Deerfield Beach records, created an award for an activist exposing governmental corruption, named "The Chaz Award" after Stevens.

In 2013, a city commissioner of Dania Beach, Florida, cited Stevens's posting of a picture of her wearing glasses with a penis nose as the reason for her retirement. She had also been facing charges of faking her residence in Dania Beach.

In 2016, based on complaints by Stevens, the state ethics commission found probable cause that the then-mayor of Deerfield Beach had misused her office. She died in 2017 before any further action could be taken.

== Festivus poles ==
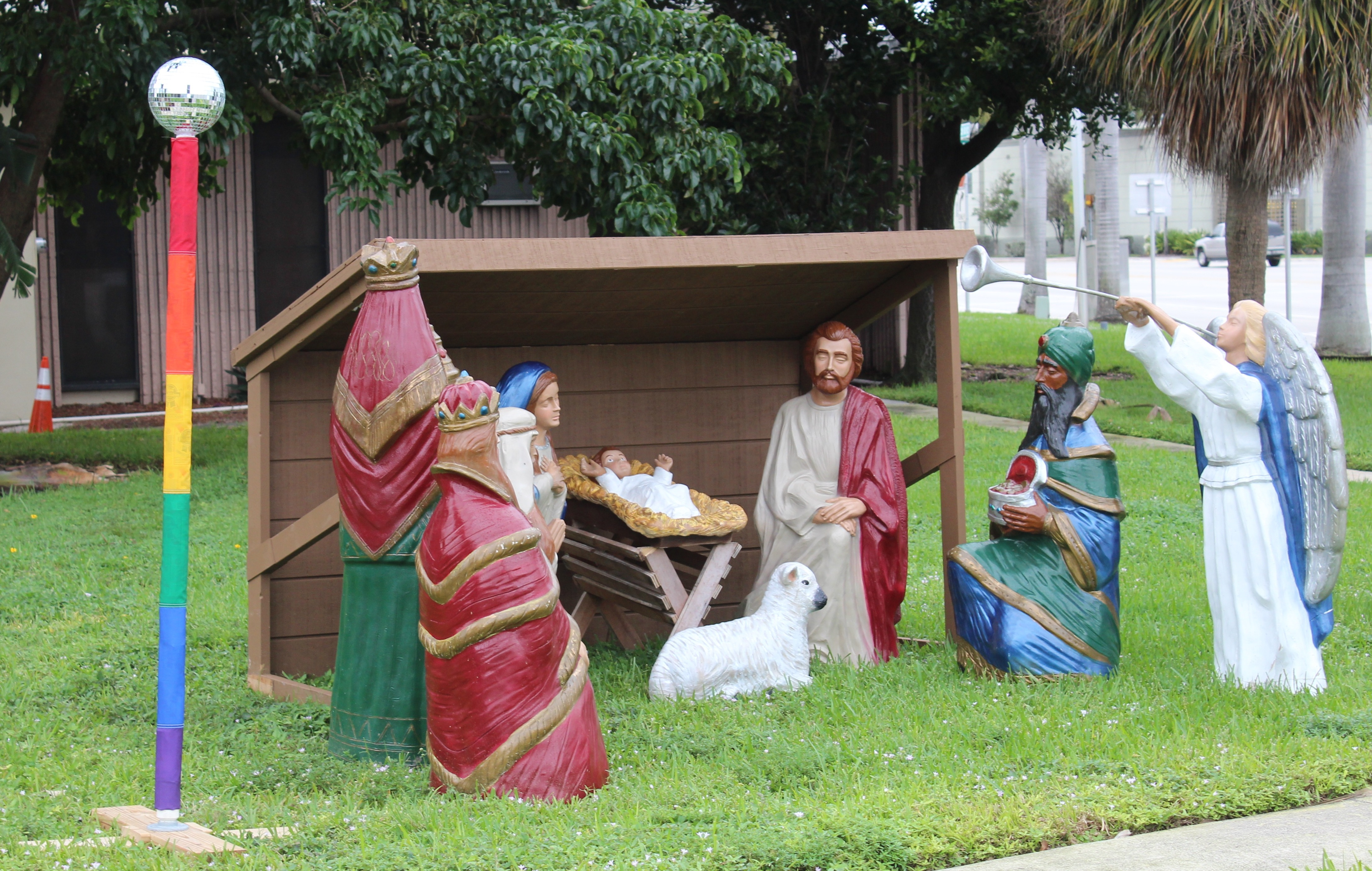
2015 Gay Pride Festivus pole at nativity scene

For five years before 2012, Stevens had unsuccessfully petitioned his hometown of Deerfield Beach to take down the religious displays, a Hanukkah menorah and Christian nativity scene, that were put up annually next to a firehouse on the Hillsboro Boulevard. So, in December 2012, with the city's permission, Stevens instead installed an 8-foot (2.4 m) aluminum Festivus pole, made out of beer cans, 6 feet (1.8 m) from the Baby Jesus.

Festivus, a fictional holiday from the Seinfeld television show, originally involved an unadorned aluminum pole, but Stevens had consulted with Allen Salkin, author of the book Festivus: The Holiday for the Rest of Us, who said that using beer cans would be within its spirit. Seinfeld writer Dan O'Keefe, who created the holiday, also approved, after the fact.

The following year, in response to the Festivus pole, Deerfield Beach passed a motion to ban all religious symbols on city property.

In December 2013, Stevens successfully petitioned to put up a 6-foot (1.8 m) Festivus pole, made of PVC and Pabst Blue Ribbon beer cans, next to a nativity scene in the Florida State Capitol. The displays were allowed inside the Capitol building because the state had designated its rotunda as a public forum. After the pole was removed in January, Stevens put it up for auction on eBay, and sold it for $455, which he promised to donate to the Women in Distress Florida domestic violence center. The combination of the poles in Deerfield Beach and the Capitol won Stevens recognition as "Best Publicity Stunt of 2014" from the New Times Broward-Palm Beach newspaper.

In December 2014, Stevens again put up a Festivus pole at the Florida State Capitol, this time accompanied by one at the city of Delray Beach.

In December 2015, Stevens expanded Festivus poles to six state capitals. He said that, though he was a privileged white heterosexual male, he was a lifelong ally of the gay community and supported the 2015 Supreme Court decision of Obergefell v. Hodges allowing gay marriage, but was angered when Kim Davis refused to issue gay marriage licenses. He and a group of supporters, organized as the Humanity Fund, put Festivus poles honoring gay pride at state capitols across the United States, especially targeting those dominated by conservatives. These poles were no longer made of Pabst Blue Ribbon cans (as the company refused to sponsor the effort); instead, they were 6 feet (1.8 m) or 6 feet 6 inches (1.98 m) of rainbow striped PVC crowned with a disco ball. They were successfully placed at the capitols of Florida, Georgia, Illinois, Michigan, Oklahoma, and Washington state. The Oklahoma pole met with opposition and anger from multiple state politicians, but was approved. A proposal to put one at the Arkansas state capitol was rejected for reasons including trademark law and not specifying how the pole would be anchored. The gay pride Festivus poles were accompanied by a fundraiser that hoped to raise $10,000 for LGBT youth organizations but only raised $800 in its first month.

In December 2016, Stevens and attorney Tom Wright put up an anti-Donald Trump "Distresstivus" pole next to a Nativity scene on city-owned property in Deerfield Beach, and another in Delray Beach, Florida, a few yards from the city's 100 feet (30 m) tall Christmas tree. The one in Delray Beach was repeatedly vandalized; the hat was stolen within 24 hours, and the entire pole was stolen a few days later. A new pole, this time with a Trump message on the pole instead of the flag, was placed a week later.

== Satan or Silence project ==
In 2014, after the United States Supreme Court decided Town of Greece v. Galloway by ruling that a town could be permitted to start its meetings with a prayer as long as it did not discriminate against minority faiths, Stevens requested that his home city, Deerfield Beach, allow him to say a Satanist prayer at the beginning of a council meeting. Through 2015, Stevens expanded this request, presenting 11 South Florida municipalities that opened city commission meetings with a prayer with a choice, either cease the prayer, or allow him to lead a prayer to Satan. He called this his "Satan or Silence Project". He said his invocations might include beer, nachos, and a mariachi band.

Different cities reacted in different ways. Delray Beach removed its religious invocation. Coral Springs, Dania Beach, and Deerfield Beach replaced their prayers with a moment of silence. Lighthouse Point scheduled Stevens to give an invocation on July 12, 2016. Boynton Beach scheduled him for a January appearance, but only notified him four days prior, which led to him missing the appearance. Lake Worth initially accepted Stevens's request, then changed to not having invocations. Lauderdale-by-the-Sea accepted the invocation, which Stevens delivered in July, accompanied by a woman twerking.

Lake County turned down Stevens's request, initially on the grounds that he did not live in the county, but its Commission Chairman said he would not allow the prayer even if Stevens became a resident. When Stevens threatened a lawsuit, Liberty Counsel, a Florida-based evangelical Christian religious litigation organization, said they would defend Lake County in court.

Pompano Beach changed its religious invocation requirements to an IRS non-profit status local congregation determined by research on the Internet, in the city Yellow Pages, or by the Chamber of Commerce. In response, Stevens founded the First Pompano Beach Church of Satan, which shared a mailing address with a local parcel service, and offered salvation, cold beer, and an occasional stripper. The city still denied Stevens's petition, saying that his stated intent to include twerking or a mariachi band indicated an intent to make a mockery of the proceedings instead of the solemn invocation required by policy. In early 2016, Stevens, without specific permission, put up an inverted cross featuring an outline of Jesus and a butt plug in front of Pompano Beach city hall.

In January 2016, Stevens erected an upside-down cross outside the city hall of Hallandale Beach. Stevens said it symbolized "Satanology", which he invented, and he placed it in response to a manger and menorah placed there during the holiday season, and to Hallandale mayor Joy Cooper's attempt to put an "In God We Trust" banner in commission chambers. The cross bore the inscription "In Chaz We Trust. All Others Pay Cash."

In November 2016, Stevens asked that the School District of Palm Beach County, which had allowed religious groups to pay to display promotional banners at its schools, allow him to put up a fence banner endorsing Satanology at Boca Raton High School. In response, the school district decided to stop accepting new applications for banners from religious groups.

== Retirement from activism and work for ESAD International ==
In 2016, Stevens retired from activism to focus on his "remote mental healthcare business", ESAD International, or ESADoggy, a business providing ESA letters to declare a pet as an emotional support animal, especially to allow them to accompany passengers on airplanes.

The definition of emotional support animals is not strongly regulated, and Stevens supported proposed Florida and Michigan laws to criminalize ESA fraud. In August 2025, he filed suit against a Central Florida psychologist for ESA fraud, stating that he was able to obtain such a letter from her, without any verification, under an imaginary name for two imaginary dogs to help with imaginary conditions.

== Return to activism ==
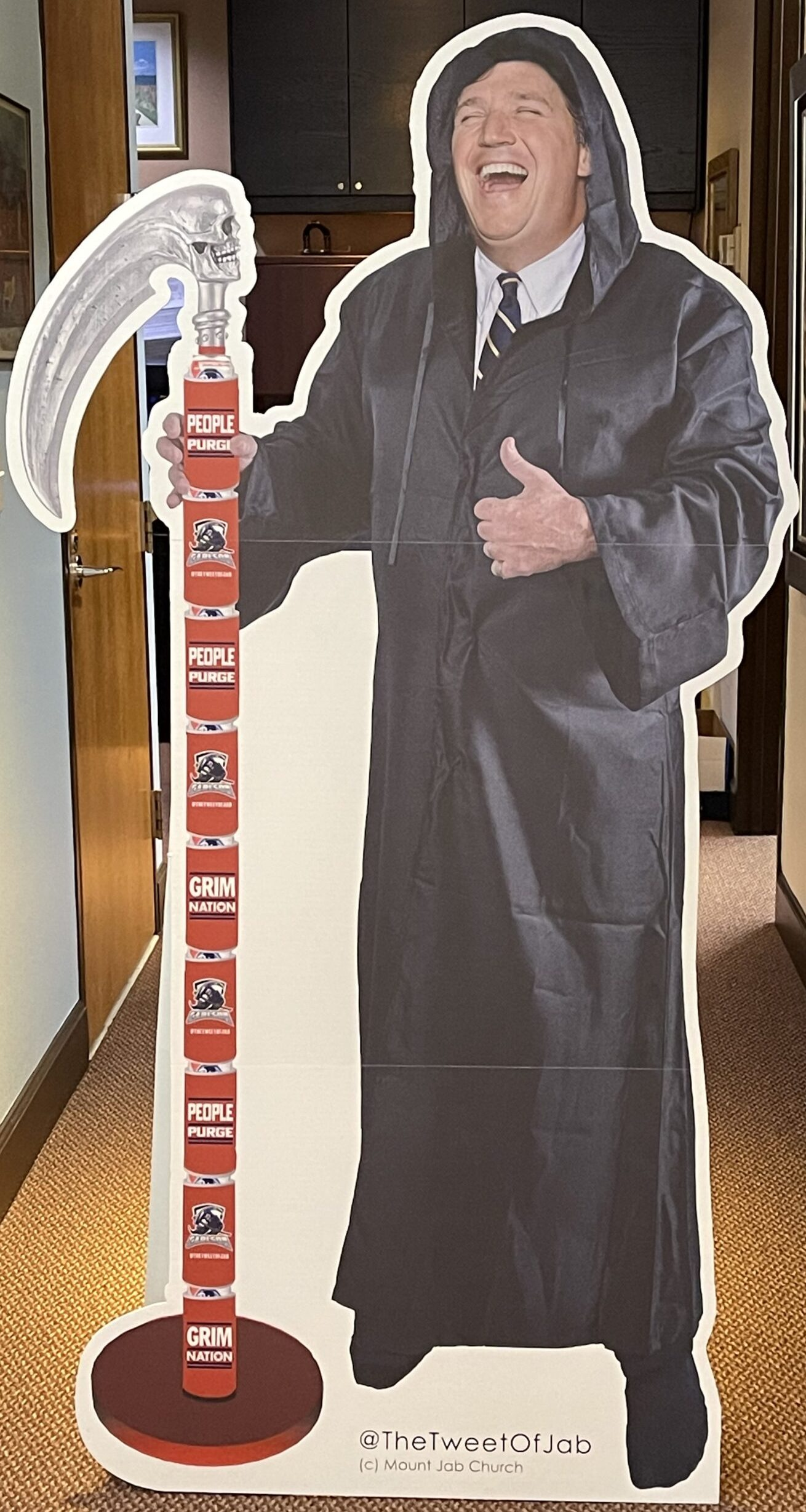
Grim Tucker cutout, 2021

In July 2021, Stevens returned to activism by mailing a gift of huge butt plugs to four Florida officials.

In November 2021, Stevens put up a COVID-19–themed holiday display in the Florida capitol, featuring two cardboard cutouts. One was of Dr. Anthony Fauci, in charge of the national response to COVID-19 in his position as director of the National Institute of Allergy and Infectious Diseases, while the other was of conservative political commentator Tucker Carlson, known for COVID-19 misinformation and opposition to Fauci, dressed as the Grim Reaper.

Other political artistic displays Stevens proposed to display in the capitol in 2022, including of governor Ron DeSantis on the cover of Playboy magazine and sex toys painted with the faces of DeSantis, U.S. representative Matt Gaetz, and former president Donald Trump, were rejected, even after Stevens tried to downgrade them to a blank sign. In January 2022, Stevens minted a non-fungible token (NFT) bearing an illustration of Francis Suarez, mayor of Miami and an advocate of cryptocurrency, depicted with a penis for a nose. Proceeds were to go to Women in Distress.

In April 2022, in response to the state of Florida banning 54 mathematics textbooks for referencing what it called critical race theory, and to passing House Bill 1467, giving parents more say in their school's school and library books, Stevens got national attention for writing petitions to 63 Florida school district superintendents requesting they ban the Bible from school classrooms and libraries. The book's inappropriate content, he wrote, included killing children (including babies being smashed against rocks in Psalm 137), bestiality, cannibalism, murder, adultery, endorsement of slavery (such as in Ephesians 6), sexual immorality and fornication. A different petition to Broward County Public Schools requested the removal of the Oxford English Dictionary. Stevens also applied for a permit from the Tallahassee fire chief in order to burn a stack of bibles. As in his other projects, he said his motivation was to "use the weight of bureaucracy against itself". The Broward County schools rejected the Bible banning request in December 2023. In April 2024, Governor Ron DeSantis signed a bill limiting challenges to books by people who did not have children in the school district, with a spokesperson specifically citing Stevens' challenge as a reason.

The Satan or Silence project resumed in June 2022, when Stevens requested equal time to open a meeting of the North Lauderdale city commission with an invocation to Satan. North Lauderdale halted its religious invocation pending review. In July 2022, following the Supreme Court decision in Kennedy v. Bremerton School District that a high school coach could pray after each game, Stevens reached out to the Broward County Public Schools asking to lead a Satanic invocation at a football game of Deerfield Beach high school, which he had attended.

In August 2022, in response to Texas Senate Bill 797, which requires Texas schools to display donated posters of the national motto "In God We Trust", Stevens launched a campaign to donate posters of the national motto written in Arabic, intending to invoke some Christians' discomfort with Islam. State senator Bryan Hughes, who had sponsored the law, said Stevens's posters did not meet the law's requirements, and would not have to be displayed, since the quotation marks around the phrase implied those words had to be in English. In June 2023, in response to Louisiana House Bill 8, requiring schools to display the motto, Stevens donated 50 to 100 "In God We Trust" posters to Louisiana schools written in languages including Arabic, Hebrew, Hindi, Spanish, and Klingon, or in English but with rainbow-colored backgrounds in support of LGBTQ+ students. In April 2025, in response to Arkansas Act 573, requiring all public school classrooms to display the Ten Commandments, Stevens offered to donate 10,000 displays of the commandments in multiple languages (including Hebrew, Arabic, Spanish, Chinese, Vulcan and Klingon) and themes ranging from satanic to rainbow.

In October 2023, when Marjory Stoneman Douglas High School put up a banner advertising Calvary Chapel Parkland's hours and support for the school, Stevens asked to put up a matching banner for his Church of Satanology. The school refused, but in December removed the Chapel banner. Other Broward County schools, however, continued to display Christian banners, while not allowing Stevens's "Satan Loves the First Amendment" banner, so in September 2024 Stevens filed a religious discrimination lawsuit. In response, in December 2024 the Broward school board voted to prohibit religious and political signs. The lawsuit, however, was allowed to continue, despite a school district challenge that claimed Stevens was insincere and Satanology was not a religion.

In January 2025, Stevens filed a candidacy to become mayor of Deerfield Beach, Florida, but withdrew in February 2025.

In April 2025, in response to Hartford, Connecticut City Council's decision to fly a Christian flag at City Hall during Holy Week, Stevens asked that the flag of his Church of Satanology and Perpetual Soirée, bearing the message "Satan Loves the First Amendment", be flown as well. He followed up with similar requests to four other Connecticut cities that similarly displayed Christian flags: New Britain, Waterbury, Torrington and Bridgeport. He threatened legal action if the cities refused, basing his argument on Shurtleff v. City of Boston, a US Supreme Court case that allowed a Christian group to fly their flag over that city hall. In July, in response to Stevens's action, the mayor of Waterbury proposed banning religious flags on city property, only to face opposition from Christian groups who said that if so, LGBT flags should also be forbidden.
