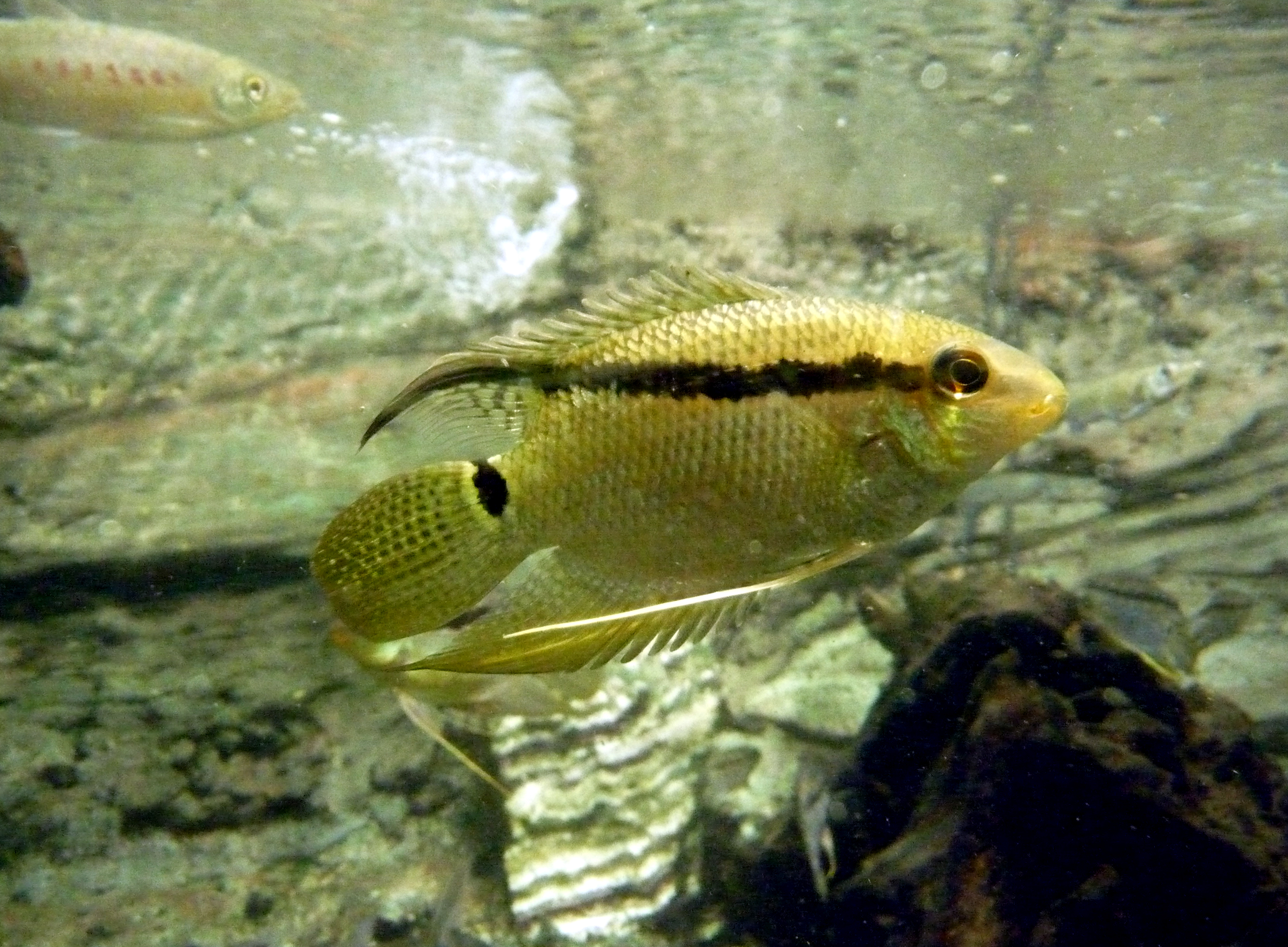

Scientific classification
- Domain: Eukaryota
- Kingdom: Animalia
- Phylum: Chordata
- Class: Actinopterygii
- Order: Cichliformes
- Family: Cichlidae
- Genus: Mesonauta
- Species: M. festivus

Binomial name
- Mesonauta festivus (Heckel, 1840)

= Mesonauta festivus =

Species of fish

Mesonauta festivus, the flag cichlid, is a species of cichlid native to the Paraná, Paraguay, Madre de Dios, Guaporé, Mamoré, Jamari and Tapajós river basins in Brazil, Peru, Paraguay and Bolivia. It can reach a standard length of 12.1 cm (4.8 in) and is sometimes kept in aquariums.

It was generally recognized as the only valid species in the genus Mesonauta until 1991 when a taxonomic review found that five species should be recognized (a sixth was described in 1998). As a consequence aquarium specimens have generally been labelled M. festivus, but this species is seen far less often than some of its relatives, especially M. guyanae, M. insignis and M. mirificus. The other species in the genus have a more northernly range than M. festivus.
