= Alternative Gifts =

Alternative Gifts may refer to:

- Alternative giving, in which the giver donates to charity on the recipient's behalf
- Alternative Gifts International, a company specialized in alternative gifts
