= Michael Kessler (disambiguation) =

Michael Kessler (born 1967) is a German actor, comedian and author.

Michael Kessler may also refer to:

- Michael G. Kessler (fl. 2000s–2010s), American businessman
- Michael Kessler (artist) (born 1954), American artist

== See also ==
- Michael Keasler (born 1942), American judge
- Mikkel Kessler (born 1979), Danish boxer
