= Virtual gift =

Virtual gift may refer to:

- A gift consisting a picture of an item, instead of the item itself, usually through the internet (e.g. Facebook gifts)
- Virtual goods, non-physical objects purchased for use in online communities or online games
- An alternative gift, a form of gift giving in which the giver makes a donation to a charitable organization in the recipient's name, rather than giving an item
