= Mark O'Keefe (screenwriter) =

American screenwriter

- Education: Harvard University (BA)
- Occupation: Screenwriter
- Known for: Bruce Almighty; Click; The O'Keefes
- Father: Daniel O'Keefe
- Relatives: Laurence O'Keefe (brother); Dan O'Keefe (brother)

Markham O'Keefe is an American screenwriter, who specializes in the comedy genre. He wrote and produced the 2003 film Bruce Almighty, starring Jim Carrey, and the 2006 film Click, starring Adam Sandler. O'Keefe resides in Los Angeles.

== Biography ==
His brothers are Broadway and movie songwriter Larry O'Keefe (composer and lyricist of shows including Bat Boy: The Musical and Legally Blonde) and Seinfeld writer and producer Dan O'Keefe. Their father, Daniel O'Keefe Sr., invented their private family holiday Festivus, which gained national exposure when depicted in an episode of Seinfeld (written by Dan), and which is now celebrated across the globe.

O'Keefe created the short-lived TV show The O'Keefes, which was loosely based on his family (except that Larry was turned into a girl, named Lauren). The show, starring Judge Reinhold, was on The WB in the summer of 2003, but only 5 episodes aired before it was cancelled. The show generated controversy among people who felt that it depicted homeschooling in a negative light.

His project Evan Almighty was released in the summer of 2007.

O'Keefe graduated from Harvard University in 1992 and participated in Hasty Pudding Theatricals, the Krokodiloes and The Harvard Lampoon.
