= The O'Keefes =

- Genre: Sitcom
- Created by: Mark O'Keefe
- Starring: Judge Reinhold; Kirsten Nelson; Joseph Cross; Tania Raymonde; Matt Weinberg
- Composers: Jonathan Wolff; Jack Diamond
- Country of origin: United States
- Original language: English
- No. of seasons: 1
- No. of episodes: 8 (3 unaired)

Production
- Camera setup: Single-camera
- Running time: 30 minutes
- Production companies: Hamcat Productions; Turner Television

Original release
- Network: The WB
- Release: May 22 – June 12, 2003

The O'Keefes is an American television sitcom created by Mark O'Keefe, that aired on The WB from May 22 to June 12, 2003.

== Premise ==
The series was about the O'Keefe family: Harry and Ellie, together with their children, Lauren, Danny and Mark. The plot centered on the fact that the O'Keefe parents had homeschooled their children for most of their lives and with the dramatic and comic interest arising in situations where the children were beginning to experience the outside world.

The show was reportedly controversial among parents who homeschool their children, as they felt it portrayed homeschooling in a negative light.

== Cast ==
- Judge Reinhold as Harrison Fitzpatrick "Harry" O'Keefe
- Kirsten Nelson as Ellie O'Keefe, Harry's wife
- Joseph Cross as Danny O'Keefe, Harry & Ellie's first son
- Tania Raymonde as Lauren O'Keefe, Harry & Ellie's daughter
- Matt Weinberg as Mark O'Keefe, Harry & Ellie's second son

== Episodes ==
No.	Title	Directed by	Written by	Original release date	Prod. code
1	"Pilot"	Andy Ackerman	Mark O'Keefe	May 22, 2003	001
2	"Election"	Bryan Gordon	Jennifer Konner & Alexandra Rushfield	May 29, 2003	007
3	"Substitute Teacher"	Joanna Kerns	Craig DiGregorio	June 5, 2003	008
4	"Football"	Gil Junger	Craig DiGregorio	June 12, 2003	004
5	"Jobs"	Gerry Cohen	Paul Ruehl	June 12, 2003	005
6	"Festival of Birth"	Gil Junger	Mark O'Keefe	Unaired	002
7	"Lauren's Date"	Gil Junger	Tom Saunders & Kell Cahoon	Unaired	003
8	"Party"	Gerry Cohen	Kevin Murphy	Unaired	006
