= H&H Bagels =

Bagel company in New York City

Coordinates: 40°46′28″N 73°57′16″W

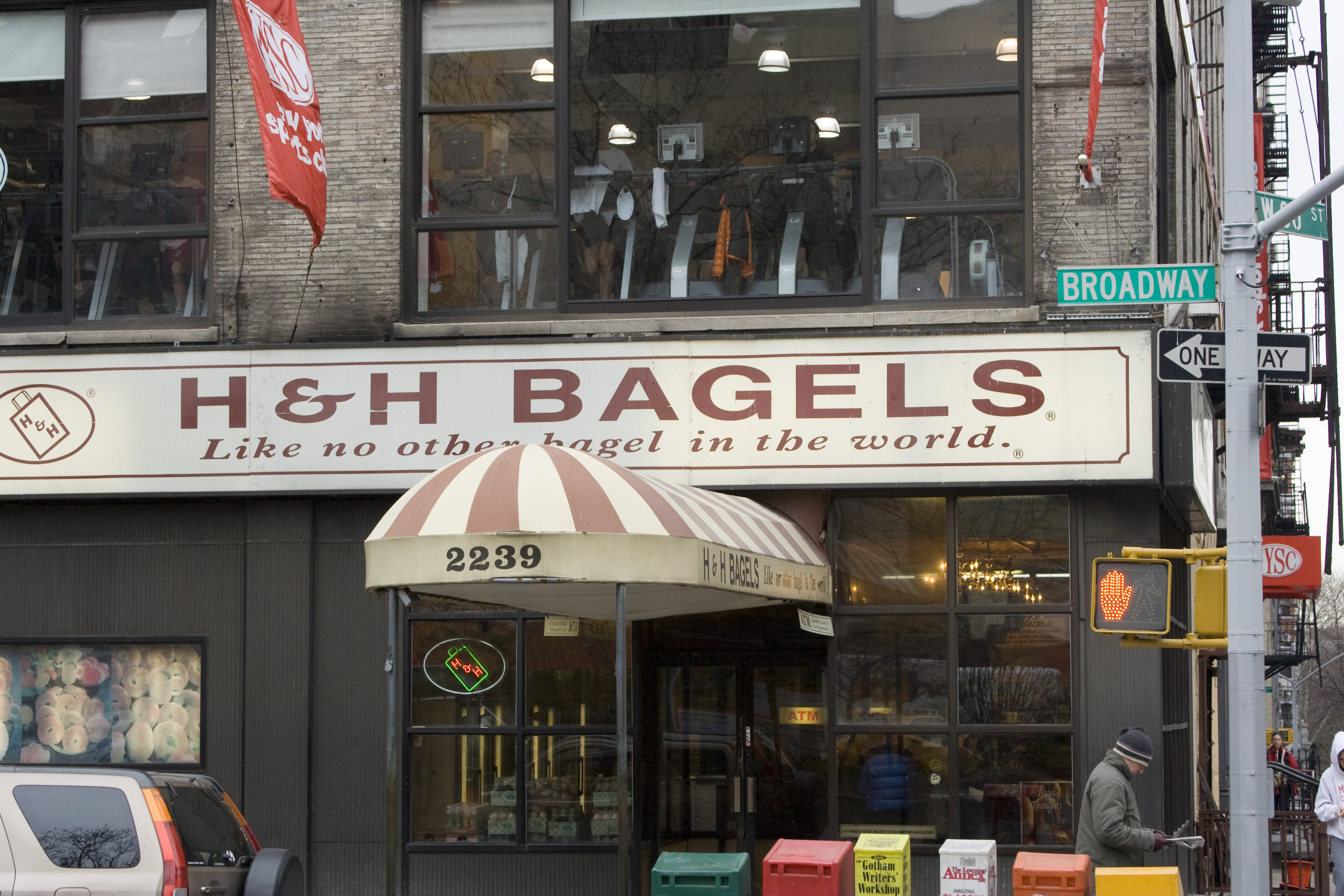
- former Broadway location, 2009
- Company type: Private
- Founded: 1972
- Founder: Helmer Toro, Hector Hernandez
- Headquarters: New York City, United States
- Number of locations: 5 (2023)
- Area served: United States
- Key people: Jay Rushin (CEO)
- Products: Bagels, baked goods, deli items
- Website: www.hhbagels.com

H&H Bagels is a bagel company in New York City that has been described as "classic", "famous", and "iconic". It operates five retail locations in New York City, with plans for 25 more stores across the United States. H&H Bagels also has nationwide shipping and global wholesale businesses.

== History ==
The business was started in 1972 when Puerto Rican Helmer Toro and his brother-in-law Hector Hernandez (hence "H&H"), bought Midtown Bagels at Broadway and 80th Street for $5,000 ($38,000 in 2018 dollar terms) in cash and $50,000 ($380,000 in 2018 dollar terms) in a loan. Toro eventually assumed full control of the business. In 1974 Toro opened H&H Midtown Bagels East on the Upper East Side of Manhattan.

In 1979 H&H went bankrupt for the first time which resulted in a new group taking over ownership of the Upper East Side H&H location while Toro retained ownership of the Upper West Side location.

In 1993 Toro moved his bakery to 46th Street at 12th Avenue in Hell's Kitchen, although his primary storefront remained on the Upper West Side.

On November 18, 2009, Manhattan District Attorney Robert Morgenthau announced the indictment and arrest of Helmer Toro for stealing withholding taxes and evading unemployment insurance taxes. The indictment alleged that between July 2003 and April 2009, Toro failed to pay $369,000 withheld from H&H employees. In May 2010 he pleaded guilty to grand larceny, and was sentenced to pay restitution of more than $540,000 and to a jail term, which he served over the course of 50 weekends from June 2010 to July 2011.

Toro's portion of H&H filed for bankruptcy protection in February 2011 in an effort to maintain its manufacturing facility in Secaucus, New Jersey, but ultimately that facility was sold at auction in October 2011. The West 46th factory store and West 80th retail location closed in January 2012. The final days and collapse of Toro's portion of H&H are chronicled in The Rise and Fall of H&H Bagels. Marc Zirogiannis wrote this business memoir on his experiences as an advisor to the owner, Helmer Toro.

In the meantime, H&H Bagels on the Upper East Side continued its normal operations. In 2014, a new CEO joined the company, implementing a new "national" approach. H&H Bagels opened a new retail location on the Upper West Side in 2016. In 2017, it launched its wholesale business supplying bagels to retailers around the world. In 2019, H&H Bagels opened locations at JFK Airport and LaGuardia Airport. It opened a Moynihan Train Hall location in 2021.

During the 2020-21 COVID-19 pandemic, H&H Bagels' nationwide shipping and global wholesale businesses grew 500% and 400% respectively. In August 2021, it launched a national franchise program, with plans to open retail locations in the top 50 U.S. markets. In April 2022, H&H renovated its Upper West Side store to serve as a flagship for its planned franchise operations. In September 2022, it secured funding to support its anticipated growth.

In May 2023, H&H announced plans for 25 new locations across the U.S. It also announced the opening of a 20,000-square foot bakery in Woodside, Queens that will supply bagels worldwide.

== Reception ==
In her autobiography, musician Mariah Carey describes H&H bagels as "sublime: soft, warm, and plump to perfection, a classic NYC morning staple..." National Geographic calls them "some of the city's best (bagels)."

== In popular culture ==
On December 18, 1997, NBC aired the Seinfeld episode entitled "The Strike", in which Cosmo Kramer returns to work at H&H Bagels after supposedly having been on strike for 12 years. He eventually strikes again, returns again, then is fired for dropping his gum into the bagel dough. The episode is also famous for introducing Frank Costanza's alternative holiday, "Festivus for the Rest of Us!"

== Retail locations ==
=== Current ===
- Upper East Side (2nd Avenue between East 80th and East 81st)

This is H&H Bagels' oldest operating location.

- Upper West Side (Columbus Avenue between West 85th and West 86th)

Opened in November 2016, this was H&H Bagels' second location. It was renovated as H&H's flagship in 2022.

- JFK Airport

H&H Bagels opened this store in JFK Airport's Terminal 5 in 2019.

- LaGuardia Airport

This unit opened in LaGuardia Airport's Terminal D in 2019.

- Moynihan Train Hall

This location opened in 2021.

=== Planned ===
- California

Five franchise locations are planned for Los Angeles.

- Connecticut

A franchise unit is planned for Stamford.

- Florida

A franchise store will open in Boca Raton in the third quarter of 2023. Five franchise locations are planned for Tampa. A company-owned unit is planned for West Palm Beach.

- New York

A company-owned New York Penn Station location will open in the fourth quarter of 2023.

- Illinois

A company-owned unit is planned for Chicago's Fulton Market.

- Virginia

Ten franchise stores are planned for the Washington metropolitan area and the Virginia Beach–Norfolk–Newport News metropolitan area.

=== Former ===
- Upper West Side (West 80th St)

Opened in 1972, this was the original location of H&H Bagels. It was open to the public 24 hours a day. Bagels were produced at the location at nearly all times of the day and night. It was closed by New York City marshals on June 29, 2011.

- Hell's Kitchen (West 46th St)

The H&H location at 639 West 46th Street also held a bakery manufacturing plant and wholesale, and a retail counter. This location was also open 24 hours a day. The property was sold in December 2011, but the company continued operating until evicted in January 2012.
