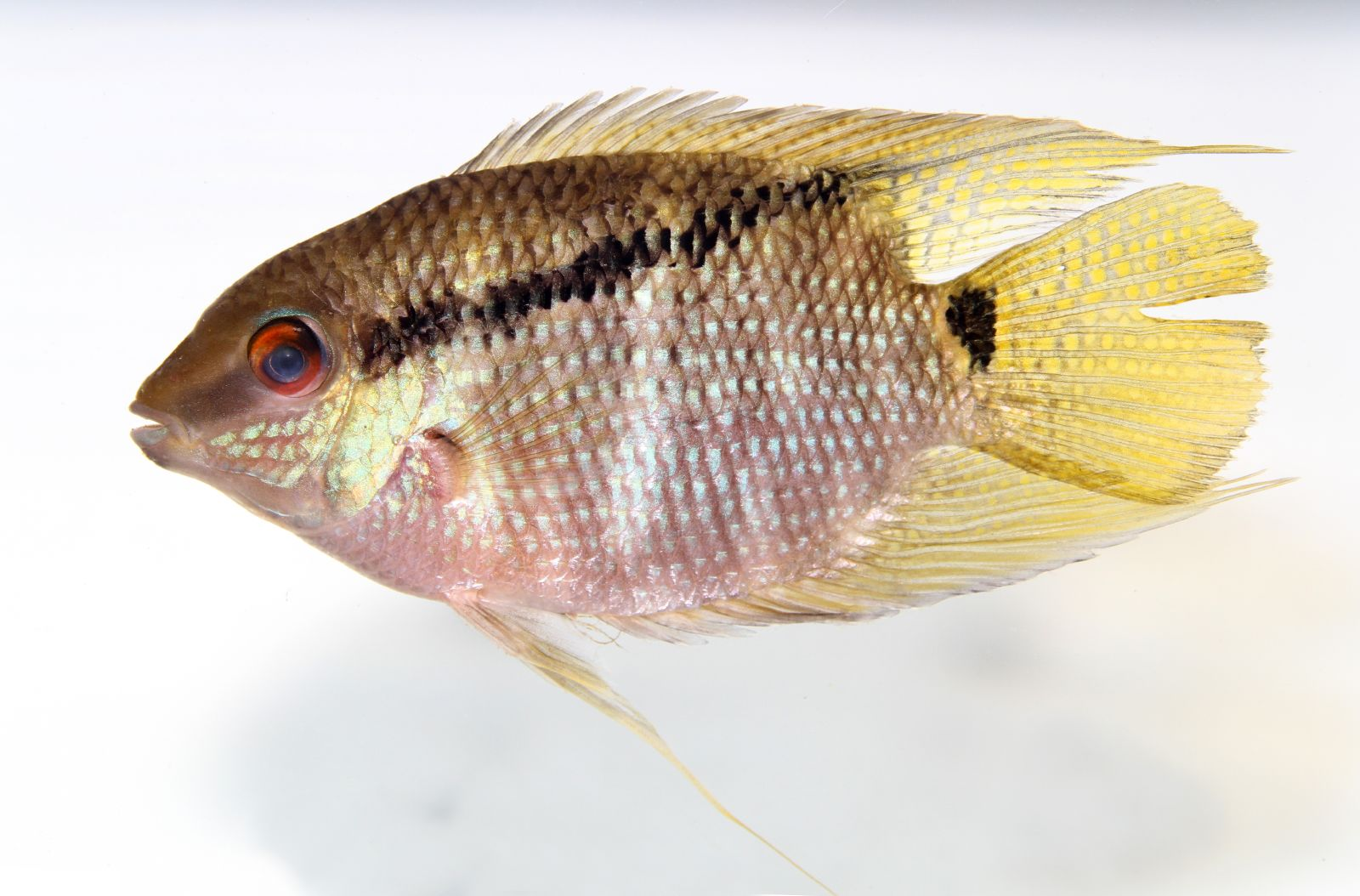
- Mesonauta insignis

Scientific classification
- Kingdom: Animalia
- Phylum: Chordata
- Class: Actinopterygii
- Division: Teleostei
- Order: Cichliformes
- Family: Cichlidae
- Tribe: Heroini
- Genus: Mesonauta; Günther, 1867

Type species
- Heros insignis Heckel, 1840

= Mesonauta =

Genus of fishes

Mesonauta, the flag cichlids, is a small genus of cichlids native to the Amazon, Orinoco, Essequibo, Paraná and Paraguay basins in South America. Mesonauta is included in the subfamily Cichlasomatinae. They occur in various freshwater habitats such as streams and lakes, especially in areas with little water movement and aquatic vegetation. They are generally found in small groups that stay near the water surface. To avoid predators, adults may jump out of the water and juveniles mimic leaves.

Some species are popular in the fishkeeping hobby and are frequently kept in aquariums. These have traditionally been referred to as M. festivus, but following taxonomic reviews of the genus in 1991 and 1998, the species most often seen in the aquarium trade are M. guyanae, M. insignis and M. mirificus. The species are similar in general appearance, but they have different distributions and can be separated by the bars they show on the body when stressed or excited (very faint when relaxed).

== Species ==
There are currently seven recognized species in this genus:

- Mesonauta acora (Castelnau, 1855)
- Mesonauta egregius S. O. Kullander & Silfvergrip, 1991
- Mesonauta festivus (Heckel, 1840) (Flag cichlid)
- Mesonauta guyanae I. Schindler, 1998
- Mesonauta insignis (Heckel, 1840) ("Acará")
- Mesonauta karipuna Oliveira, Britzke, Oliveira & da Graça, 2025
- Mesonauta mirificus S. O. Kullander & Silfvergrip, 1991

== See also ==
- List of freshwater aquarium fish species
