= Mesonauta karipuna =

- Captured specimen from the Amapá Grande River basin

Scientific classification
- Kingdom: Animalia
- Phylum: Chordata
- Class: Actinopterygii
- Division: Teleostei
- Order: Cichliformes
- Family: Cichlidae
- Genus: Mesonauta
- Species: M. karipuna

Binomial name
- Mesonauta karipuna Oliveira, Britzke, Oliveira & Graça, 2025

Species of ray-finned fish

Mesonauta karipuna is a species of ray-finned fish belonging to the cichlid family (Cichlidae). The species' was first described in 2025 by Rianne Caroline de Oliveira, Ricardo Britzke, Claudio Oliveira & Weferson Júnio da Graça.

A relatively new species of Mesonauta from the Amapá Grande River basin in northern Brazil. This species is distinguished from all its congeners by its coloration pattern and the shape of flank bars 3 to 7. In addition, mitochondrial DNA-based species delimitation analyses indicate a high degree of divergence (Barcode distance > 6%) between this species and all its congeners. M. karipuna is found exclusively in tributaries of the Amapá Grande River basin, and a concise discussion is provided on the characteristics of this watershed, which has been modified by anthropogenic impacts in the state of Amapá.

== See also ==
- List of freshwater aquarium fish species
