= Alternative Gifts International =

Charity based in Kansas

Alternative Gifts International is a charity on the BBB Wise Giving Alliance headquartered in Wichita, Kansas. It sponsors events known as Alternative Gift Markets.

== See also ==
- Alternative giving
