= Laurence O'Keefe (composer) =

American composer

- Born: Laurence Crawford O'Keefe; 1969 (age 56–57)
- Education: Harvard College; Berklee College of Music; University of Southern California
- Occupations: Composer; lyricist
- Notable work: Bat Boy; Legally Blonde; Heathers: The Musical
- Spouse: Nell Benjamin (m. 2001)
- Parents: Daniel O'Keefe (father); Deborah O'Keefe (mother)
- Relatives: Dan O'Keefe (brother); Mark O'Keefe (brother)
- Awards: Lucille Lortel Award for Outstanding Musical (2001)

Laurence Crawford O'Keefe (born 1969) is an American composer for Broadway musicals, film and television. He won the 2001 Lucille Lortel Award, Outstanding Musical as composer for Bat Boy: The Musical.

== Early life and education ==
O'Keefe was born in 1969. He is the second of three sons born to writer and editor Daniel O'Keefe and his wife Deborah. His brothers are Dan and Mark. All three sons also became writers. Laurence O'Keefe is a graduate of Harvard College (1991), where he studied anthropology, wrote humor for the Harvard Lampoon, and sang with the Harvard Krokodiloes. He got his start in musical theater through Harvard's Hasty Pudding Theatricals, performing in the Pudding's drag burlesques. He also composed Suede Expectations, book by Mo Rocca, and wrote a libretto for another production, Romancing the Throne.

O'Keefe later studied composition and film scoring at Berklee College of Music and the University of Southern California, receiving a master's degree in composition for film and television.

== Career ==
=== Bat Boy: The Musical ===
O'Keefe has composed music and lyrics for a wide variety of works. He wrote the score for Bat Boy: The Musical, which ran Off-Broadway from March 3 to December 2, 2001. Bat Boy received eight Drama Desk Award nominations, including for Outstanding Music and Outstanding Lyrics, won two Richard Rodgers Awards from the American Academy of Arts and Letters, and won both the Lucille Lortel Award and the Outer Critics' Circle Award for Best Off-Broadway Musical. It has since been produced by more than 500 regional and amateur companies across the USA. Bat Boy: The Musical opened at the Shaftesbury Theatre on London's West End on September 8, 2004, and ran until January 15, 2005.

Bat Boy: The Musical has also been produced in Seoul, South Korea, and Tokyo and Osaka in Japan, and at the Edinburgh Festival Fringe. In 2001, O'Keefe received the Jonathan Larson Performing Arts Foundation Award. In 2004 O'Keefe won the Ed Kleban Award for Outstanding Lyrics, a $100,000 prize, in part for his work on Bat Boy. There are two Kleban Awards every year, one given to a lyricist, the other to a book writer.

=== Legally Blonde: The Musical ===
O'Keefe and his wife Nell Benjamin's Legally Blonde: The Musical opened in San Francisco on February 2, 2007. It opened on Broadway at the Palace Theatre on April 29, 2007, and closed on October 19, 2008. For their work on Legally Blonde, they received Drama Desk nominations for Outstanding Music and Outstanding Lyrics, as well as a Tony Award nomination for Best Score.

The first national tour of Legally Blonde opened at the Providence Performing Arts Center on September 23, 2008. While nearly identical to the Broadway production, the touring production received considerably more enthusiastic reviews than the Broadway version, and was more profitable. The first national tour ended August 15, 2010, at the Wolf Trap Arts Center in Vienna, Virginia.

Legally Blonde opened on January 12, 2010, at the Savoy Theatre in London's West End, starring UK television stars Sheridan Smith, Jill Halfpenny and Peter Davison, plus pop star Duncan James. Many reviews were positive, especially for the cast. The Independent reviewer wrote: "Totally blown away...it's ridiculously enjoyable from start to finish." The Guardian reviewer concluded "the predominantly female audience with whom I saw the show seemed to be having a whale of a time and did not give a damn about the fact that the musical is little more than a nonsensical fairytale."

Legally Blonde won three 2011 Laurence Olivier Awards including Best New Musical and Best Actress in a Musical for Sheridan Smith and Best Supporting Performance in a Musical for Jill Halfpenny.

The show has had several tours worldwide, including the UK, Australia, and New Zealand. It premiered to a sold-out audience at the Ronacher Theatre in Vienna, Austria.

=== Heathers: The Musical ===
With co-author Kevin Murphy, O'Keefe co-wrote Heathers: The Musical, a musical based on the movie of the same name. Directed by Andy Fickman, the musical premiered at the Hudson Backstage Theatre in Los Angeles in September 2013. The musical then was produced Off-Broadway in 2014 at the New World Stages Theatre. Heathers received its UK premiere at The Other Palace in London in June 2018. Starring Carrie Hope Fletcher as Veronica and Jamie Muscato as JD, the production was a huge hit; on the first day tickets went on sale, the demand for tickets crashed the Other Palace website twice, and whole eight-week limited run sold out before opening night.

The show moved to the West End, opening at the Theatre Royal Haymarket on September 14, 2018. The musical received six nominations for the 2019 Whatsonstage.com Awards, including Best New Musical (winner), Best Actor In A Musical (Muscato), Best Actress In A Musical (winner, Fletcher), Best Director (Andy Fickman) and Best Lighting Design (Ben Cracknell).

=== Theatre, TV and concerts ===
O'Keefe and his wife Nell Benjamin collaborated on a short musical titled The Mice. The Mice was presented by Hal Prince as a part of the three-show evening 3hree at the Prince Music Theater in Philadelphia in 2000 and in Los Angeles in 2001.

With Benjamin, O'Keefe has written two musicals for Theatreworks USA: Cam Jansen (2004) and Sarah, Plain and Tall (2002).

In February 2004, O'Keefe guest-conducted the Harvard Pops Orchestra in an evening of his songs, and premiered his short opera The Magic Futon. A repeat performance with the Pops was presented in November 2008.

O'Keefe worked with David Shiner on the music, lyrics, and book, for Drop Everything, a new clown show/musical, workshopped at ACT Theatre in Seattle. Excerpts were also produced at the Tollwood Arts Festival in Munich and the Lisbon Comedy Festival.

O'Keefe and Benjamin wrote an operatic musical, first produced at New York's Fiorello H. LaGuardia High School of Music & Art and Performing Arts in 2012, titled Life of The Party. It was set in the Soviet Union in 1953 and based on true stories. It focused on the artists who labored under harrowing conditions to create Soviet movie musicals, trying to please both Stalin's regime and the public. The show later received a new workshop at New York University's Steinhardt School in March 2017.

O'Keefe and Benjamin have written many songs and pieces for movies, television and concerts, including The Daily Show on Comedy Central, Johnny and the Sprites on The Disney Channel, Ant & Dec's Saturday Night Takeaway on UK's ITV, Defiance on SyFy, and Julie's Greenroom on Netflix. O'Keefe arranged and orchestrated the overture and other pieces of music for a Beatles tribute concert at the Hollywood Bowl, titled "Sgt. Pepper's At 40". O'Keefe and Benjamin contributed a new song, "This Is The Show", to the season finale of Best Time Ever With Neil Patrick Harris on NBC.

They wrote narration and new comic verses for the New York Philharmonic's New Year's Eve 2015 gala, La Vie Parisienne. This was set to the music of Camille Saint-Saëns's Carnival Of The Animals, replacing the traditional introductory poems by Ogden Nash, and performed that night by Nathan Lane.

O'Keefe is currently working on a Disney musical film adaption of The Princess and the Pea with Ingrid Michaelson cowriting the music with him.

In January 2025, The Old Globe Theatre in San Diego announced the world premiere of a Renaissance Faire-themed musical called Huzzah!, composed and written by O'Keefe and Nell Benjamin, and directed by Annie Tippe. The show was scheduled for an eight-week run from September 25 to October 19, 2025.

=== Teaching and other work ===
O'Keefe is active as a writer, teacher and advocate in the Broadway and New York theatre communities. He has served on the Nominating Committee of the Tony Awards. He is a member of the Dramatists Guild, where he teaches composition and writing to emerging theater artists as the co-head of the Dramatists Guild Foundation's Fellows Program, and conducts master classes for the DGF's Traveling Fellows Program. Since 2005 O'Keefe has served as the head of the Music Department and Resident Artist for Harvard University's Freshman Arts Program. He teaches master classes across the country at Harvard, NYU, Berklee College of Music, Yale University and elsewhere.

== Theater works ==
Year	Title	Music	Lyrics	Book	Theatre
2001	Bat Boy	Laurence O'Keefe		Keythe Farley and Brian Flemming, based on the fictional creature	Union Square Theatre, Off-Broadway
2002	Sarah, Plain and Tall	Laurence O'Keefe	Nell Benjamin	Julia Jordan, based on the children's book by Patricia MacLachlan	Lucille Lortel Theatre, Off-Broadway
2004	Cam Jansen	Laurence O'Keefe and Nell Benjamin, based on the book series by David A. Adler			Lamb's Theatre, Off-Broadway
2007	Legally Blonde	Laurence O'Keefe and Nell Benjamin		Heather Hach, based on the film and the novel by Amanda Brown	Palace Theatre, Broadway
2014	Heathers	Laurence O'Keefe and Kevin Murphy, based on the film by Daniel Waters			New World Stages, Off-Broadway
2025	Huzzah!	Laurence O'Keefe and Nell Benjamin			The Old Globe Theatre, San Diego
Forthcoming	Dark Lord: The Teenage Years	Laurence O'Keefe and Kevin Murphy, based on the book by Jamie Thomson			

== Film works ==
Year	Title	Music	Lyrics	Screenplay	Studio
Forthcoming	Penelope	Laurence O'Keefe and Ingrid Michaelson		Robert Sudduth, based on the fairy tale "The Princess and the Pea"	Walt Disney Pictures
