= Mesonauta egregius =

Scientific classification
- Kingdom: Animalia
- Phylum: Chordata
- Class: Actinopterygii
- Order: Cichliformes
- Family: Cichlidae
- Genus: Mesonauta
- Species: M. egregius

Binomial name
- Mesonauta egregius Kullander & Silfvergrip, 1991

Species of fish

Mesonauta egregius is a species of cichlid fish endemic to the Meta and Vichada River basins (both tributaries of the Orinoco) in Colombia. It is typically found near aquatic plants in shallow water and reaches a standard length up to 8.2 cm (3.2 in).
