= Click (2006 film) =

2006 comedy-drama film by Frank Coraci

- Theatrical release poster
- Directed by: Frank Coraci
- Written by: Steve Koren; Mark O'Keefe
- Produced by: Adam Sandler; Jack Giarraputo; Neal H. Moritz; Steve Koren; Mark O'Keefe
- Starring: Adam Sandler; Kate Beckinsale; Christopher Walken; Henry Winkler; David Hasselhoff; Julie Kavner; Sean Astin
- Cinematography: Dean Semler
- Edited by: Jeff Gourson
- Music by: Rupert Gregson-Williams
- Production companies: Columbia Pictures; Revolution Studios; Happy Madison Productions; Original Film
- Distributed by: Sony Pictures Releasing
- Release date: June 23, 2006
- Running time: 107 minutes
- Country: United States
- Language: English
- Budget: $85 million
- Box office: $268.7 million

Click is a 2006 American fantasy comedy-drama film directed by Frank Coraci, written by Steve Koren and Mark O'Keefe, both of whom produced with Jack Giarraputo, Neal H. Moritz, and Adam Sandler, who also starred in the lead role. The film co-stars Kate Beckinsale, Christopher Walken, Henry Winkler, David Hasselhoff, Julie Kavner, and Sean Astin. Sandler plays Michael Newman, a workaholic family man and architect who acquires a magical universal remote that enables him to control reality. The film is inspired by "The Magic Thread", a folk tale included in The Book of Virtues: A Treasury of Great Moral Stories.

Filming began in late 2005 and was finished by early 2006. Sony Pictures Releasing released Click in the United States on June 23, 2006, and received mixed reviews. It was made on a budget of $85 million and grossed $268.7 million. It was nominated for Best Makeup at the 79th Academy Awards. The movie has since became a cult classic.

== Plot ==
In 2006, architect Michael Newman works constantly under his overbearing boss, John Ammer, and regularly prioritizes work over his parents, his wife Donna, and their children, Ben and Samantha. One night, while working on a project, he has an argument with Donna about cancelling a family trip in favor of working. Unable to keep track of multiple remote controls, he visits Bed Bath & Beyond to buy a universal remote. He stumbles around various departments before falling asleep on a display bed.

After he wakes up, he enters the 'Beyond' door and meets a man calling himself Morty, who gifts him a prototype universal remote, and warns him that the remote cannot be returned. Returning home, Michael accidentally discovers that the remote can control not just electronics, but his whole life. He uses it at work to cause mischiefs and 'fast-forward' inconveniences such as heavy traffic, illnesses, and arguments. Morty tells him that during these times, his body is on auto-pilot, going through the motions while his mind skips ahead.

Anticipating a promotion after using the remote at a work dinner/presentation, Michael spends lavishly on himself and his family, only for Ammer to reveal that he will have to wait several months. Believing he has disappointed his family, Michael uses the remote to skip ahead to the promotion, which skips an entire year of his life. In 2007, he is in marriage counseling with Donna, and the family dog, Sundance, has died, replacing him with a small dog named Peanut. The remote, having learned Michael's preferences, begins to fast-forward automatically whenever there is a problem that Michael usually fast forwards through. Despite Michael's numerous attempts to get rid of the remote, it reappears. Later, Michael tells Morty to return the remote back where it belongs since the remote started to operate on its own, but Morty refuses to take it back because it cannot be returned, fulfilling his warning.

The next day, Michael tries to outsmart the remote from skipping his daily routines by not taking a bath and going to work on a bathrobe instead. However, when Ammer tells Michael that he is moving to Morocco and suggests that Michael may one day become the CEO, he says he would love for that to happen, causing the remote to skip ahead 10 years in the future. In 2017, Michael is the wealthy, morbidly obese CEO of the company, his children are moody teenagers, Peanut has died and the new family dog, Shaggy, replaces him, Donna has divorced Michael and is now dating Bill, Ben's former swim coach, and his family hate him because of his actions. When a furious Michael attacks Bill, the new dog jumps up and pushes him over, knocking Michael unconscious, causing the remote to fast-forward six years to 2023. Michael learns from Donna that his head injury resulted in a diagnosis of cancer. He suffered a heart attack during chemotherapy, but has recovered and recently had liposuction. He also learns that Donna is married to Bill; she forgives Michael for all the actions he had caused, but Michael is devastated after finding out that his relationship with Donna is over.

Michael learns from Ben, now working in his company as a rising executive, that his father Ted died in 2021. Realizing that he wasn't present at the time of Ted's death, Michael reviews his last moment with his father, learning that he coldly refused to spend time with Ted; instead, he stayed at work. At Ted's grave, Michael confronts Morty, who reveals that he is an Angel of Death and that taking Ted was not something he wanted to do. Overcome with guilt and shame, Michael asks to go to a 'good place', whereupon the remote fast-forwards to Ben's wedding in 2029. Michael is shocked to see that his mother is so old, and he suffers another heart attack after overhearing Samantha refer to Bill as her father.

At the hospital, Ben reveals that he postponed his honeymoon due to work. Realizing that Ben is repeating Michael's mistakes, Michael gathers the last of his strength to follow Ben outside. When Michael collapses in the parking lot, he urges Ben to put his family first, makes peace with Bill, and assures his family that he loves them before dying.

Suddenly, Michael unexpectedly awakens back in 2006 at Bed Bath & Beyond. Convinced his harrowing experiences were simply a dream, he approaches life with renewed appreciation. He visits his parents and tells them how much he loves them, then goes home and reassures Donna, Ben, and Samantha that he will spend more time with them. Later, he discovers the remote on his kitchen counter, accompanied by a note from Morty. Understanding that it was not just a dream, but rather a warning, Michael disposes of the remote in the trash, and it no longer appears automatically. Michael goes to spend time with his family.

== Cast ==
- Adam Sandler as Michael Newman
  - Emilio Cast as 10-year-old Michael Newman
- Christopher Walken as Morty, the Angel of Death
- Kate Beckinsale as Donna Newman, Michael's wife
- Henry Winkler as Ted Newman, Michael's father
- Julie Kavner as Trudy Newman, Michael's mother
- David Hasselhoff as John Ammer, Michael's overbearing boss
- Sean Astin as Bill, Ben's swimming coach and Donna's second husband in the alternate timeline
- Jennifer Coolidge as Janine, Donna's neurotic best friend, whom Michael detests
- Danielle Tatum McCann as Samantha Newman, Michael's 5-to-6-year-old daughter
  - Lorraine Nicholson as 16-year-old Samantha
  - Katie Cassidy as 28-year-old Samantha
- Joseph Castanon as Ben Newman, Michael's 7-to-8-year-old son
  - Jonah Hill as 18-year-old Ben
  - Jake Hoffman as 24-to-30-year-old Ben
- Cameron Monaghan as Kevin O'Doyle, Michael's obnoxious 10-year-old next-door neighbor
- Rachel Dratch as Alice/Alan (in the alternate timeline a year later), Michael's assistant
- Sophie Monk as Stacey
- Michelle Lombardo as Linda
- Sally Insul as Aunt Peggy
- Jana Kramer as Julie, adult Ben's wife-to-be
- Nick Swardson as a Bed, Bath & Beyond Guy
- Frank Coraci as a Male Nurse
- Dolores O'Riordan as Singer
- Iryna Blokhina as Jogger
- Rob Schneider as Prince Habeeboo (uncredited)
- Terry Crews as Man singing in car (uncredited)
- James Earl Jones as himself / Narrator (voice only, uncredited)

== Production ==
On July 23, 2003, Sony Pictures purchased Steve Koren and Mark O'Keefe's spec script Click for $1.75 million, with plans for it to be an Adam Sandler film produced by Revolution Studios, Columbia Pictures, and Neal H. Moritz's company Original Film; the purchase occurred as Bruce Almighty (2003), also written by Koren and O'Keefe, had grossed $236 million domestically in its two-month run. Click was the second comedy Moritz produced for Columbia, after Not Another Teen Movie (2001). Although Sony planned filming to begin in April 2004 after Sandler finished shooting Spanglish (2004), that was postponed for Koren and O'Keefe to rewrite the script under the supervision of Juan José Campanella, who was announced as director in May 2004. However, he was replaced by Frank Coraci, who directed the Sandler films The Wedding Singer (1998) and The Waterboy (1998), in March 2005. Executive producer Tim Herlihy also revised the script. Christopher Walken joined the cast on February 23, 2005. Principal photography on the film started on July 6, 2005 (which coincidentally was the 10th anniversary of the start of principal photography, on July 6, 1995, of Happy Gilmore, another Adam Sandler film).

Imageworks began working on the film's digital effects in January 2006 without any research and development. While most of the effects were shot compositings, three-dimensional graphics were also made for the display on the remote and matte painting a few settings, such as the Bed Bath & Beyond warehouse, a city background at Michael's workplace, and the winter backyard at his home; programs such as Cinema 4D and Autodesk Maya were used to produce the graphics. In order to make the fast-forwarding and rewinding look DVD-like, effects of interlaced video and scan lines "slicing through" were added. Motion control photography and green screen effects were used for scenes where Michael looked back on his life with the remote, meaning that there were occasionally two Michaels in the same shot. Rotoscoping was used for the sequence where he changes the color of his face with the remote.

For scenes where Michael pauses his surroundings, the effects crew originally planned for everything to be frozen, including the environment; however, they found out this "bothered" the eye, thus switching the plan to only the characters being frozen while the environment (such as leaves on the trees being blown by wind) keeps in motion. The primary challenge for the freeze shots was sharpening the frozen characters as much as possible; there were some cases where the characters would freeze in a very active moment, causing the effects team to have to work with the motion blur that resulted from it. For instances where characters were frozen in a moment where they were still, they were filmed staying in that position for seconds so that, during post-production, the average of multiple frames would create a result absent of film grain.

== Release and promotion ==
Click's official website debuted in late December 2005, consisting only of the film's official trailer; C.S. Strowbridge of The Numbers called the trailer "better than I expected. It seems like Adam Sandler is serious about maturing as an actor." Other interactive features and pages were added later on, such as a plot summary, image gallery, information about the cast and crew, audio and video clips, and a Control Your Universe poster generator.

The film screened out of competition at the San Sebastian International Film Festival. The film was released in the United States on June 23, 2006, and made its UK premiere in a London Empire Cinema on September 28, 2006.

=== Home media ===
Click was released on DVD, Blu-ray, and UMD on October 10, 2006, by Sony Pictures Home Entertainment. It was the first dual layer Blu-ray disc to be released by Sony. Ahead of the 20th anniversary of its release, the film was released on 4K Ultra HD Blu-ray on June 23, 2026.

== Reception ==
=== Box office ===
==== Domestic ====
Before Click's theatrical run, Strowbridge predicted, on the basis of a weak critical reception and the commercial failure of a similar dramedy attempt of Sandler's, Spanglish, Click would be one of his lesser hits; however, he suggested it could still gross up to $125 million due to its mixture of comedy and drama elements. The weekend before the film's release, Nikki Finke projected an opening weekend gross of $40 million due to similarly high numbers of prior Sony-produced Sandler comedies such as 50 First Dates (2004), Mr. Deeds (2002), and Anger Management (2003). The day before the film's theatrical start, Entertainment Weekly's Joshua Rich projected Click to have a $55 million opening weekend and a total overall gross of $210 million for its "broadly appealing" high concept and the inclusion of Adam Sandler and Kate Beckinsale in lead roles.

Domestically, Click opened in 3,749 theaters and debuted at number-one at the box office, grossing $14.5 million on its opening day and $40 million in its opening weekend; Sony distributed the film in a hugely successful year as it was their seventh number-one hit of 2006. Groups of viewers outside the young male demographic were also higher than previous Sandler films; Sony's exit polls showed 51% of attendees being female and 50% over the age of 25. Click was also one of the only three films to surpass a $10,000 theater average that weekend with $10,673; the other two were Wassup Rockers and Leonard Cohen: I'm Your Man, both of which played at one theater.

Strowbridge predicted that in its second weekend, Click would fall 50% and gross $20 million due to intense competition with Superman Returns. However, while Click grossed approximately that amount and got dethroned by the superhero film as expected by analysts, what wasn't anticipated was that The Devil Wears Prada would open with double the gross initially projected; as a result, The Devil Wears Prada made $27.5 million in three days and placed Click in the number-three spot.

During its third weekend, when the record-breaking Pirates of the Caribbean: Dead Man's Chest debuted, Click had the second-strongest hold of all competitors in the top five; it dropped only 40% from the prior weekend, while Pixar's Cars went down to 38%, The Devil Wears Prada to 47%, and Superman Returns to 60%; Click also surpassed the $100 million mark that weekend, making it the seventh Sandler film to gross that amount. It later grossed $143.4 million in the United States and $125.3 million internationally, with a total gross of $268.7 million worldwide.

==== International ====
Click opened on June 30, 2006, in Australia and New Zealand to the number-one spot in both countries; in Australia, it made $2.97 million from 281 theaters, in New Zealand $853,000 from 48. The following week, it went down 34% making $1.98 million in Australia while opening to six screens in Ireland with $59,000. By the fourth week of its international run, Click had grossed a total of $10.87 million and was running in four countries, $9.51 million of the total gross being from Australia. On the weekend of August 28, 2006, Click had a strong number-one debut in Mexico, grossing $1.76 million from 418 theaters, which helped launch the film into the international top ten, specifically number seven; it grossed $4.26 million from 1,159 screens in 22 nations, bringing the international total to $25.71 million. It went down to number nine the following weekend, grossing $3.47 million from 1,104 screens in 27 countries and increasing the total gross to $31.12 million.

=== Critical reception ===
On the review aggregator website Rotten Tomatoes, 34% of 170 critics' reviews are positive, with an average rating of 4.8/10. The website's consensus reads: "This latest Adam Sandler vehicle borrows shamelessly from It's a Wonderful Life and Back to the Future, and fails to produce the necessary laughs that would forgive such imitation." Metacritic, which uses a weighted average, assigned the film a score of 45 out of 100, based on 35 critics, indicating "mixed or average" reviews. Audiences polled by CinemaScore gave the film an average grade of "B+" on an A+ to F scale.

The film was criticized for its gross-out humor and unlikeable protagonist. Entertainment Weekly critic Lisa Schwarzbaum wrote Click failed at being It's a Wonderful Life because "Michael earns none of George Bailey’s mature wisdom honestly."

When it came to positive reviews, Newsweek claimed Click was predictable as a moral story but "unusually dark, occasionally touching and pretty funny" for a Sandler comedy. Empire's Sam Toy enjoyed the film for its "smart and genuinely moving ideas," Beckinsale's performance, and a strong third act, although he dismissed the script for being overstuffed, the first half of the film for Sandler being too restrained in his everyman role, and actors such as Coolidge, Hasselhoff and Walken for being put in small roles. Peter Bradshaw opined Click was an improvement over the previous Sandler flick Mr. Deeds (2002): "It has some moments of good-natured sweetness and Adam Sandler is improving as a comic performer, though he is still conceited and opaque."

=== Accolades ===
- 79th Academy Awards: Best Makeup (Nominated)
- 33rd People's Choice Awards: Favorite Movie Comedy (Won)
- 2006 Teen Choice Awards: Choice Movie – Comedy (Nominated)
- 2007 Kids' Choice Awards: Favorite Movie (Nominated)
- 2007 Kids' Choice Awards: Favorite Movie Actor (Won)
- The Numbers: Weekly Website Award (Won)
- Variety: Adam Sandler's 10 Worst Movies Ever (Unranked list)
