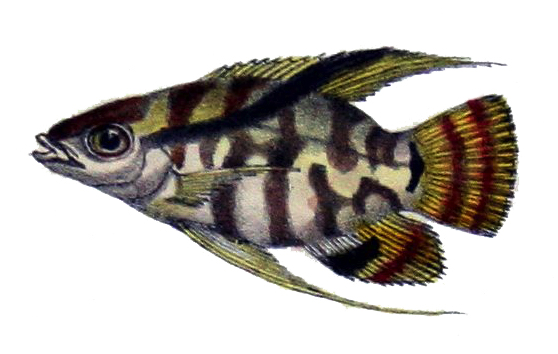
- Stressed pattern. Painting by Castelnau from the South America Expedition, published 1856

Scientific classification
- Kingdom: Animalia
- Phylum: Chordata
- Class: Actinopterygii
- Division: Teleostei
- Order: Cichliformes
- Family: Cichlidae
- Genus: Mesonauta
- Species: M. acora

Binomial name
- Mesonauta acora (Castelnau, 1855)

Synonyms
- Chromys acora Castelnau, 1855

= Mesonauta acora =

Species of fish

Mesonauta acora is a species of cichlid fish endemic to the Amazon Basin of Brazil; specifically, to blackwater in the Xingu and Tocantins River basins in South America. The species was named by François Louis de la Porte, comte de Castelnau in 1855.

All Mesonauta Acoras are omnivores. Their diet is composed of insects, aquatic invertebrates and algae.

== Morphology / Taxonomic Detail ==
Mesonauta acora is a laterally compressed cichlid that typically reaches between 6 and 10 cm in length. It can be identified by a distinct oblique dark band running from the snout through the eye to the dorsal-fin region, along with 12–13 dorsal spines and 10–11 anal spines that differentiate it from related species. DNA-barcoding analysis of the cytochrome c oxidase I (COI) gene confirms M. acora as a genetically distinct lineage within the genus, clarifying its taxonomic boundaries.

== See also ==
- List of freshwater aquarium fish species
