= Daniel O'Keefe (writer) =

American writer and creator of Festivus (1928 – 2012)

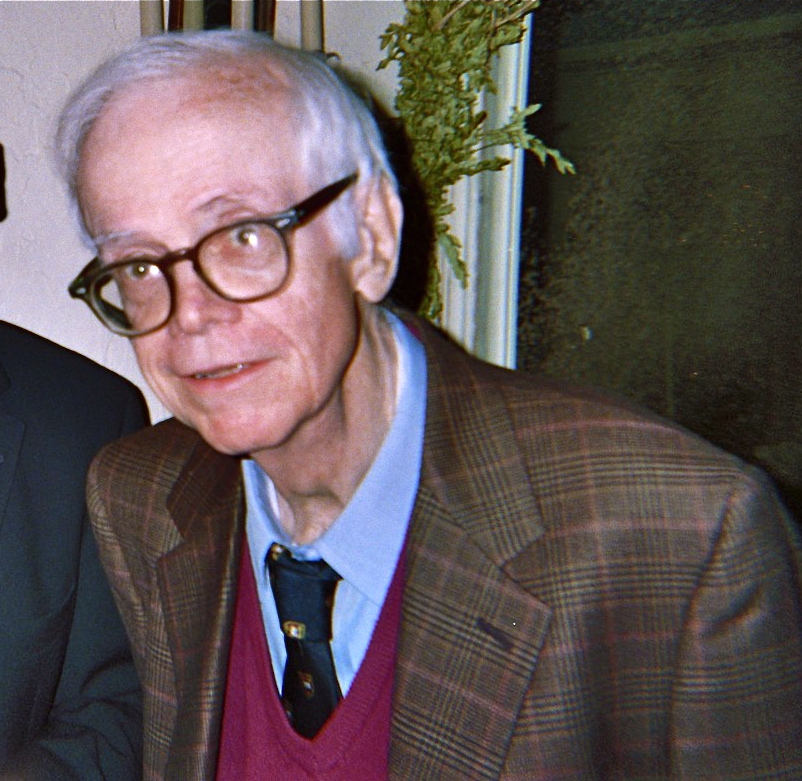
- O'Keefe in the late 2000s
- Born: Daniel Lawrence O'Keefe; February 25, 1928; Jersey City, New Jersey, U.S.
- Died: August 29, 2012 (aged 84); New York City, U.S.
- Education: Columbia University (BA, MA); New School for Social Research (PhD)
- Occupation: Writer
- Spouse: Deborah O'Keefe
- Children: Dan O'Keefe; Laurence O'Keefe; Mark O'Keefe
- Writing career
- Subject: Social science
- Notable works: Stolen Lightning: The Social Theory of Magic; Festivus

Daniel Lawrence O'Keefe (February 25, 1928 – August 29, 2012) was an American writer. He was an editor at Reader's Digest for more than 30 years, where he worked with a wide range of writers.

He is known for creating Festivus, an annual secular holiday celebrated on December 23; it became more widely known after his eldest son, Dan O'Keefe, featured it in a December 1997 episode of the sitcom Seinfeld.

== Early life and education ==
Born in Jersey City, New Jersey, O'Keefe received a B.A. from Columbia in 1949, an M.A. from Columbia University, and a PhD. from the New School for Social Research. At Columbia, he was national president of Junior Achievement.

He was personally recruited for work by DeWitt Wallace, founder of Reader's Digest. O'Keefe became an editor there, serving for over thirty years. He worked with freelancers such as Ray Bradbury and Nobel Prize-winning Polish poet Czesław Milosz, who lived and worked for decades in California.

== Writing ==
In 1982, O'Keefe published the book Stolen Lightning: The Social Theory of Magic, a comprehensive, objective text on magic theory throughout human history. He dedicated the work to his wife Deborah. A Los Angeles Times book review called this book "a spectacular synthesis of sociology, anthropology, and psychoanalysis... a tour de force of accessible scholarship". The New York Times Book Review said it is "a powerful explication of how deeply magic is embedded in society." Commonweal classified it as "a potential classic".

Theologian Harvey Cox called it "a breathtaking accomplishment," and sociologist Robert Nisbet described it as "the most comprehensive, theoretically informed, and objective study of magic that I can recall reading."

In 1983, it was placed on the New York Times' list of Books for Vacation Reading as a "sociological theory of magic and of 'people's perception and use of it.'"

== Festivus ==
O'Keefe founded Festivus in 1966 to commemorate his first date with his wife Deborah three years earlier. In 1997, their son Dan O'Keefe, a writer on the Seinfeld television series, adapted Festivus for the episode "The Strike". Although many aspects of the O'Keefe family practices made it onto the show, the key piece of the O'Keefe version of Festivus, a clock nailed to a bag on a wall, was replaced by an aluminum pole.

== Personal life ==
Daniel and Deborah O'Keefe married in 1963. She is a writer, publishing numerous magazine articles, as well as the books Good Girl Messages and Readers in Wonderland, works of literary criticism. The couple had three sons, each of whom became a writer and or composer/lyricist: Dan O'Keefe, Laurence O'Keefe, and Mark O'Keefe.

- Dan is a television writer. In addition to Seinfeld, he has written for Silicon Valley, The Drew Carey Show, The League, Veep, and other shows. In 2005, he published a book, The Real Festivus.
- Laurence is a composer, lyricist, and book-writer of musicals, including Batboy and Heathers. He collaborated on the Broadway show Legally Blonde with his wife, Nell Benjamin.
- Mark (aka Markham) has written for television, specifically the David Letterman and Bill Maher series, and for sitcoms including NewsRadio and a show he created, The O'Keefes. He also collaborated with Steven Koren on screenplays for Bruce Almighty and Click.
