= Dan O'Keefe (writer) =

American writer and producer

- Born: 1967 or 1968 (age 57–58)
- Education: Harvard University (AB)
- Occupations: Television writer; producer
- Parents: Daniel O'Keefe (father); Deborah O'Keefe (mother)
- Relatives: Laurence O'Keefe (brother); Mark O'Keefe (brother)

Daniel O'Keefe (born 1967 or 1968) is an American television writer and producer, who has worked on such shows as Seinfeld, The Drew Carey Show, The League, Silicon Valley, and Veep.

== Early and personal life ==
O'Keefe was born to writers Deborah and Daniel O'Keefe, who was best known as the creator of the holiday Festivus. O'Keefe has two brothers: composer Laurence O'Keefe and screenwriter Mark O'Keefe.

O'Keefe graduated from Harvard University with a Bachelor of Arts degree in 1990. He currently resides in Los Angeles.

== Career ==
As a television writer, O'Keefe was responsible for popularizing the holiday Festivus on the 1997 Seinfeld episode "The Strike". Festivus had been invented in the 1960s by O'Keefe's father, editor and author Daniel O'Keefe (1928–2012).

In 2005, Dan O'Keefe published a book about the holiday and its history, titled The Real Festivus.
