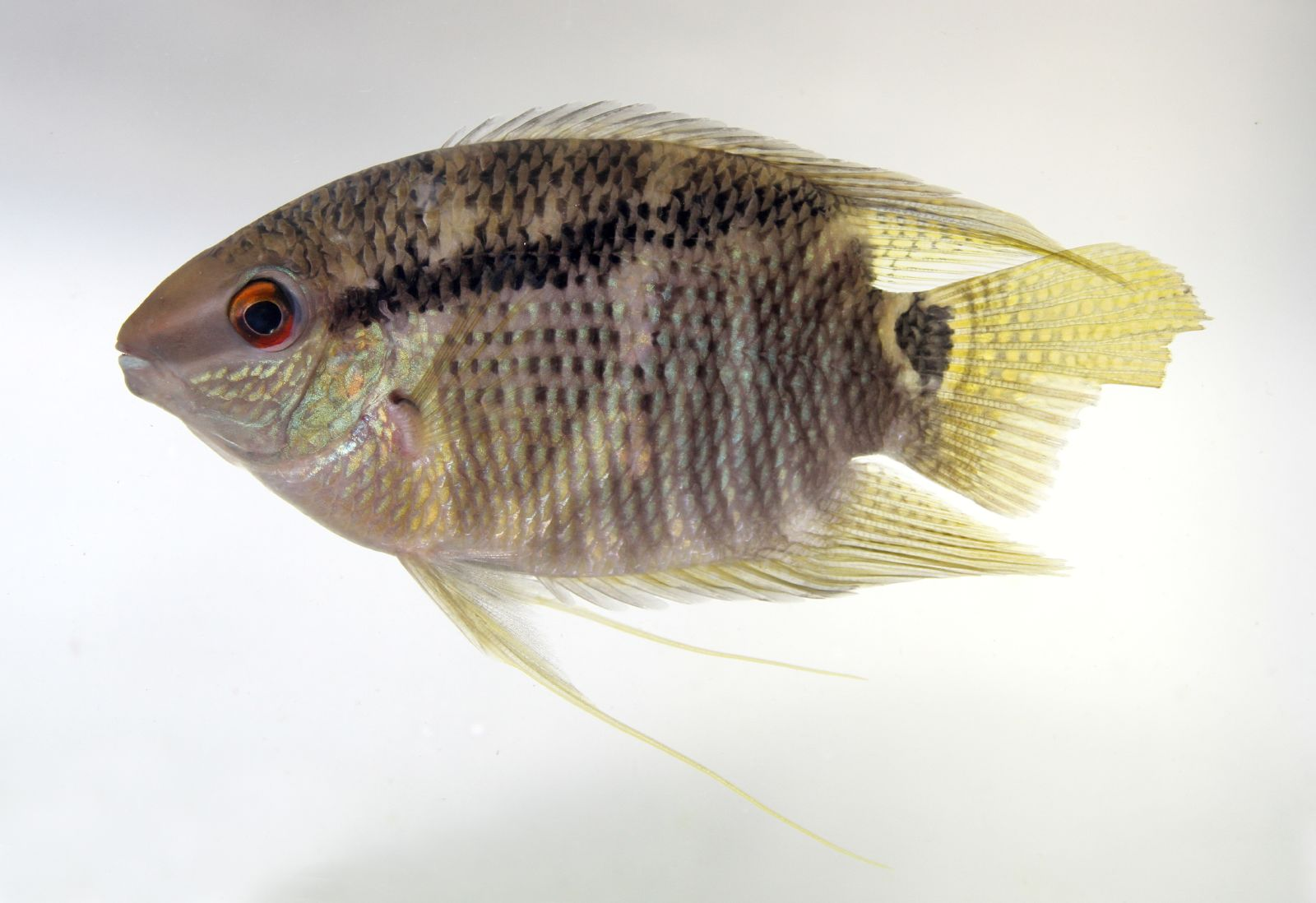

Scientific classification
- Kingdom: Animalia
- Phylum: Chordata
- Class: Actinopterygii
- Division: Teleostei
- Order: Cichliformes
- Family: Cichlidae
- Genus: Mesonauta
- Species: M. insignis

Binomial name
- Mesonauta insignis (Heckel, 1840)

Synonyms
- Heros insignis Heckel, 1840

= Mesonauta insignis =

Species of fish

Mesonauta insignis is a species of cichlid fish native to the Orinoco and upper Rio Negro basins in South America. Although generally reported to reach a length up to 9.7 cm (3.8 in), others suggest it can reach about twice that size.
