= Mesonauta guyanae =

Scientific classification
- Kingdom: Animalia
- Phylum: Chordata
- Class: Actinopterygii
- Order: Cichliformes
- Family: Cichlidae
- Genus: Mesonauta
- Species: M. guyanae

Binomial name
- Mesonauta guyanae I. Schindler, 1998

Species of fish

Mesonauta guyanae is a species of cichlid fish native to the Essequibo (Guyana) and Rio Negro (Brazil) basins in South America. It reaches a standard length up to 10 cm (3.9 in).
