= Allen Salkin =

American journalist, author, and critic

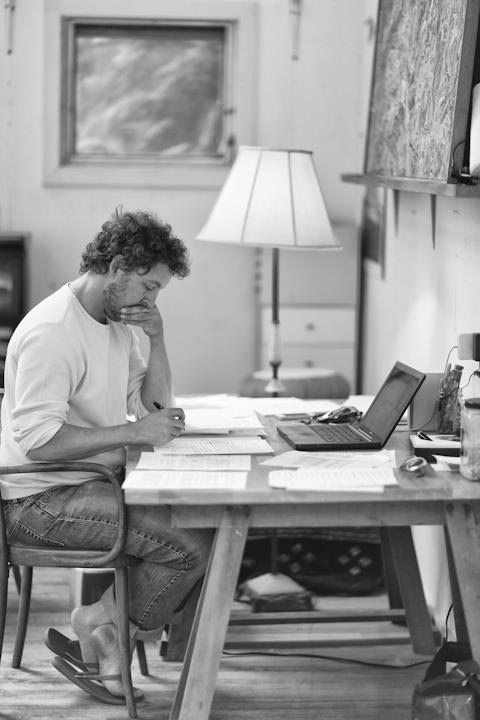
Allen Salkin at his writing desk in 2012

Allen Salkin is an American journalist, author, and critic who has written for the New York Daily News, New York Times, and other publications.

== Education ==
Salkin earned a Bachelor of Arts degree from University of California, Berkeley and a Master of Arts in journalism from New York University.

== Career ==
His 2013 book, From Scratch, gives a behind-the-scenes look at the history and personalities who created and staffed the Food Network. He is also the author of the book Festivus: The Holiday for the Rest of Us about the parody holiday of Festivus. Salkin spent three years as a staff reporter at The New York Times, hosted a video series on AOL's former blog Slashfood, and appeared on a number of reality TV series.

Published in hardcover on October 1, 2013 by G. P. Putnam's Sons and in paperback on October 7, 2014 by Berkley Books with a new afterword and subtitle, From Scratch is based upon extensive inside access, documents, and interviews with executives, presenters, and former and current employees of the Food Network. Salkin interviewed over 200 people who have been involved with the network's history. Salkin takes an in-depth look at the business side of how early executives managed to create a television network out of an idea that some called "the worst idea ever"."From Scratch" was named by NPR as one of the best books of 2013.

He has written for various publications on subjects including Annie Leibovitz's financial troubles, the last true waterbed salesman in the San Francisco Bay Area, the lives of R. and Aline Crumb in France, The Secret, Sri Sri Ravi Shankar, and the NYU Suicides. In the 1990s as a political and investigative reporter at the New York Post, he was on a team with Maggie Haberman and Jack Newfield that exposed corruption in the city's Surrogates Court. He also covered politics and real estate, writing dispatches on Eliot Spitzer's first race for New York Attorney General and on the business structures of Donald Trump's buildings.

He appeared on the reality TV show #1 Single. On episode two of this show, he is shown meeting Lisa Loeb on an airplane date, and then having a second date where he takes Lisa to the Donut Plant. The relationship ends in the same episode, when Loeb's date "eventually turns sour when the guy uses her fame to boost his own career." He appeared on two episodes of E! True Hollywood Story, one which featured Chris Farley and another with Paula Deen, made an appearance as an expert on the trendiness of monocles for Q with Jian Ghomeshi, and has done media interviews as an expert on celebrity chefs and food media for NPR's Weekend Edition, Morning Joe, Reliable Sources with Brian Stelter, ABC News Nightline, and on other outlets.

In the documentary City of Gold, Salkin compares the restaurant critic Jonathan Gold to Raymond Chandler. Salkin also appeared in the documentary series Eat: The Story of Food and, uncredited, in the documentary Bill Cunningham New York. He was featured in Bad Vegan: Fame. Fraud. Fugitives., a Netflix documentary series about restaurateur Sarma Melngailis.

Starting in 2015, Salkin began writing film reviews for the New York Daily News, and is listed on Rotten Tomatoes as a "Top Critic". In 2018, Salkin signed a deal with St. Martin's Press to co-author, with political reporter Aaron Short, The Method to the Madness: How Donald Trump Went from Penthouse to White House in Fifteen Years--An Oral History.
