= The Strike (Seinfeld) =

- Seinfeld episode
- Episode no.: Season 9 Episode 10
- Directed by: Andy Ackerman
- Written by: Dan O'Keefe and Alec Berg & Jeff Schaffer
- Production code: 910
- Original air date: December 18, 1997

Guest appearances
- Jerry Stiller as Frank Costanza; Estelle Harris as Estelle Costanza; Bryan Cranston as Tim Whatley; Kevin McDonald as Denim Vest (Steve); Daniel Von Bargen as Kruger; Tracy Letts as Counter; Colin Malone as Sleazy Guy named Charlie; Karen Fineman as Gwen; Dave Florek as Harry; Stacey Herring as Sandy; Jerry Dixon as Customer; Ruth Cohen as Ruthie Cohen (uncredited)

Episode chronology
← Previous "The Apology"	Next → "The Dealership"
- Seinfeld season 9

"The Strike" is the 166th episode of the NBC sitcom Seinfeld. This was the tenth episode of the ninth and final season. It aired on December 18, 1997. This episode features and popularized the holiday of Festivus.

In this episode, Jerry dates a woman who looks attractive sometimes and ugly at other times, Kramer returns to his old job at a bagel shop, and George gets out of buying Christmas gifts for his co-workers with fake donations to The Human Fund, a made-up charity. TV Guide ranked this episode number three on its "Top 10 Holiday Episodes" list.

== Plot ==
At Tim Whatley's Hanukkah party, Elaine gives a man named Steve her default fake phone number when he hits on her. She realizes she wrote it on the back of a card showing she purchased 23 submarine sandwiches. Determined to get her free sandwich, she goes to the off-track betting parlor whose phone number is her fake number. The clerks at the betting parlor flirt with Elaine, prompting her to give the number for H&H Bagels. She goes to the bagel shop and waits to receive Steve's call there.

The minimum wage is raised, effectively ending the 12-year strike at Kramer's employer, H&H Bagels, so he returns to work. After learning about Festivus from George and Jerry, Kramer becomes fascinated with the concept and meets with Frank Costanza, who invented the holiday to get out of the pandemonium of Christmas shopping. Kramer requests to have time off work to celebrate Festivus. His request is denied, so he goes back on strike, picketing outside the store and sabotaging the bagel machine, causing a steam vent to burst inside the store. Not wanting to miss Steve's call, Elaine remains inside. She goes to meet Steve for her sandwich card. Turned off by Elaine's steam-drenched appearance, he makes an excuse to leave and gives her a fake phone number.

To avoid buying gifts for his co-workers, George hands out cards for donations to "The Human Fund", a fake charity. His boss, Mr. Kruger, decides to give a company donation to the Human Fund, and learns that the charity is bogus. He demands that George explain his actions. George tells him that he celebrates Festivus instead of Christmas, so he gave out the fake cards to avoid being persecuted for his beliefs. To prove that Festivus is real, George takes Kruger to Festivus dinner at his parents' house.

Jerry dates Gwen, a woman he met at Tim's party. In certain lighting, she is much less attractive than when he first met her. To consistently get her good side, he insists on their always eating at Monk's and always at the same booth. When Kramer first meets Gwen, he sees her unattractive side and does not recognize her when picketing outside the bagel store, claiming that she is more attractive than Jerry's actual girlfriend. Gwen thinks Jerry always has them eat at Monk's to keep his actual girlfriend from learning he is being unfaithful.

Jerry, Elaine, George, and Mr. Kruger attend the Festivus dinner. The clerks from the betting parlor call H&H Bagels asking for Elaine, so Kramer brings them and Gwen to the dinner. Gwen sees Elaine, who she thinks is Jerry's "ugly" girlfriend, and storms out. Frank declares that Kramer will perform the traditional "feats of strength". To avoid it, Kramer renounces Festivus and claims he has to work a double shift at H&H Bagels. Frank forces George to perform the feats of strength instead.

Kramer is fired after his chewing gum becomes stuck in the bagel dough.

== Production ==
Festivus was based on a holiday created by writer Dan O'Keefe's father, Daniel, though several aspects with no basis in the real holiday were added. These include the aluminium pole and the December 23 observance (the real Festivus had no firm date and was held spontaneously). Frank Costanza actor Jerry Stiller dragged the aluminum pole at Michael Richards's suggestion. The Human Fund was conceived by writer Jeff Schaffer and based on Christmas cards the Seinfeld staff would receive from Castle Rock.

To enhance the ugliness of Gwen's "ugly" side, the crew had actress Karen Fineman wear a prosthetic behind her lip and put bits of tissue inside her nose to make it appear bigger.

The Human Fund is the name of an actual organization based in Cleveland, Ohio established in 2005, eight years after the episode's airing. The organization drew its name from the episode.

== Festivus ==
In the years since "The Strike" first aired, Festivus has entered popular culture and is celebrated annually, usually on December 23, as a tongue-in-cheek secular alternative to Hannukah and Christmas. In 2005, Daniel O'Keefe published a book about the origins of the holiday, The Real Festivus: The True Story Behind America's Favorite Made-up Holiday.
