= Mesonauta mirificus =

Scientific classification
- Kingdom: Animalia
- Phylum: Chordata
- Class: Actinopterygii
- Order: Cichliformes
- Family: Cichlidae
- Genus: Mesonauta
- Species: M. mirificus

Binomial name
- Mesonauta mirificus Kullander & Silfvergrip, 1991

Species of fish

Mesonauta mirificus is a species of cichlid fish native to the western Amazon basin in Peru and Colombia. It is typically found near plants in blackwater rivers and reaches a length up to 9.7 cm (3.8 in).
