= Festivus =

Secular holiday celebrated December 23

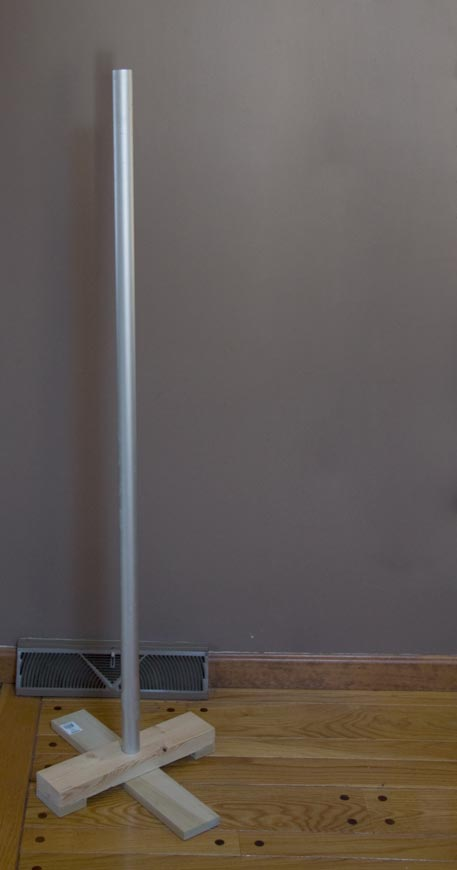
- Festivus pole
- Type: Secular
- Significance: Celebrated as an alternative to the pressures and commercialism of the Christmas holiday season
- Celebrations: Airing of grievances, feats of strength, the aluminum pole, Festivus dinner, Festivus miracles
- Date: December 23
- Frequency: Annual

Festivus (/ˈfɛstɪvəs/) is a secular holiday celebrated on December 23 as an alternative to the perceived pressures and commercialism of the Christmas season. Originally created by author Daniel O'Keefe, Festivus entered popular culture after it was made the focus of the 1997 Seinfeld episode "The Strike", which O'Keefe's son Dan O'Keefe co-wrote.

The non-commercial holiday's celebration, as depicted on Seinfeld, occurs on December 23 and includes a Festivus dinner, an unadorned aluminum Festivus pole, practices such as the "airing of grievances" and "feats of strength", and the labeling of easily explainable events as "Festivus miracles". The episode refers to it as "a Festivus for the rest of us".

It has been described both as a parody holiday festival and as a form of playful consumer resistance. Journalist Allen Salkin describes it as "the perfect secular theme for an all-inclusive December gathering".

== History ==
=== Creation ===
Festivus was conceived by author and editor Daniel O'Keefe, the father of television writer Dan O'Keefe, and was celebrated by his family as early as 1966. While the Latin word fēstīvus means "excellent, jovial, lively", and derives from fēstus, meaning "joyous; holiday, feast day", Festivus in this sense was coined by the elder O'Keefe. According to him, the name "just popped into my head". In the original O'Keefe tradition, the holiday would take place to celebrate the anniversary of Daniel O'Keefe's first date with his future wife, Deborah. The phrase "a Festivus for the rest of us" originally referred to those remaining after the death of the elder O'Keefe's mother, Jeanette, in 1976; i.e., the "rest of us" are the living, as opposed to the dead.

In 1982, Daniel O'Keefe wrote a book, Stolen Lightning: The Social Theory of Magic, that deals with idiosyncratic ritual and its social significance, a theme relevant to Festivus tradition.

It is now celebrated on December 23, as depicted in the Seinfeld episode written by the younger O'Keefe.

=== Seinfeld ===
The Seinfeld episode that featured Festivus was titled "The Strike", although O'Keefe notes that the writers later wished they had named it "The Festivus". It was first broadcast on December 18, 1997. The plot revolves around Cosmo Kramer (Michael Richards) returning to work at his old job, H&H Bagels. While dining at Monk's Restaurant, as George Costanza (Jason Alexander) is opening his mail, he receives a card from his father saying, "Dear Son, Happy Festivus." This leads to Jerry Seinfeld (Jerry Seinfeld) and Elaine Benes (Julia Louis-Dreyfus) discussing George's father's creation of Festivus despite George not wanting it to be discussed. Kramer then becomes interested in resurrecting the holiday when, at the bagel shop, Frank Costanza (Jerry Stiller) tells him how he created Festivus as an alternative holiday in response to the commercialization of Christmas.

Meanwhile, George creates donation cards for a fake charity called The Human Fund (with the slogan "Money for People") in lieu of having to give office Christmas presents. When his boss, Mr. Kruger (Daniel von Bargen), questions George about a $20,000 check he gave George to donate to the Human Fund as a corporate donation, George hastily concocts the excuse that he made up the Human Fund because he feared persecution for his beliefs, of celebrating Festivus instead of Christmas. Attempting to call his bluff, Kruger goes home with George to see Festivus in action.

Kramer eventually goes back on strike from his bagel-vendor job when his manager tells him he cannot take December 23 off to celebrate his newfound holiday. Kramer is then seen on the sidewalk picketing H&H Bagels, carrying a sign reading "Festivus yes! Bagels no!" and chanting to anyone passing the store: "Hey! No bagel, no bagel, no bagel..."

Finally, at Frank's house in Queens, New York, Jerry, Elaine, Kramer, and George gather to celebrate Festivus. George brings Kruger to prove to him that Festivus is "all too real".

O'Keefe was initially reluctant to insert his family's tradition into this episode, but when executive producers Alec Berg and Jeff Schaffer learned of the bizarre holiday through O'Keefe's brother, they became curious, then enthusiastic, then insisted that it be included in the episode. Schaffer later reflected: "That's the thing with Seinfeld stories, the real ones are always the best ones. There's a nuance to reality sometimes that is just perfect. We could have sat in a room for a billion years and we never would have made up Festivus. It's crazy and hilarious and just so funny and so disturbing. It's awesome."

== Festivus practices and traditions ==
The Festivus practices and traditions began as original O'Keefe family practices, and later expanded to include the traditions introduced in the 1997 Seinfeld episode "The Strike".

=== O'Keefe family practices (1966–1997) ===
The O'Keefe family holiday featured other practices, as detailed in The Real Festivus (2005), a book by Daniel O'Keefe's son, Dan O'Keefe. Besides providing a first-person account of the early version of the Festivus holiday as celebrated by the O'Keefe family, the book relates how Dan O'Keefe amended or replaced details of his father's invention to create the Seinfeld episode. Originally, the holiday celebrated the anniversary of Daniel O'Keefe's first date with his future wife Deborah, but later grew to encompass the elder O'Keefe's dislike of organized religion and the commercialization of Christmas. The holiday was typically celebrated around the Christmas and holiday season, but was also celebrated at other times of the year based on O'Keefe's whims.

==== Festivus clock ====
In a 2013 CNN segment on the origins of Festivus, O'Keefe spoke about the real-life experiences related to the holiday. O'Keefe's father, who originated some of the now-recognized Festivus traditions, used a clock in a bag nailed to a wall, not an aluminum pole. It was never the same bag, rarely the same clock, but always the same wall. The nailing was most often done in secret and then revealed proudly to his family. The younger O'Keefe told CNN: "The real symbol of the holiday was a clock that my dad put in a bag and nailed to the wall every year...I don't know why I don't know what it means, he would never tell me. He would always say, 'That's not for you to know'."

=== Fictional practices introduced due to the Seinfeld television episode (1997–onwards) ===
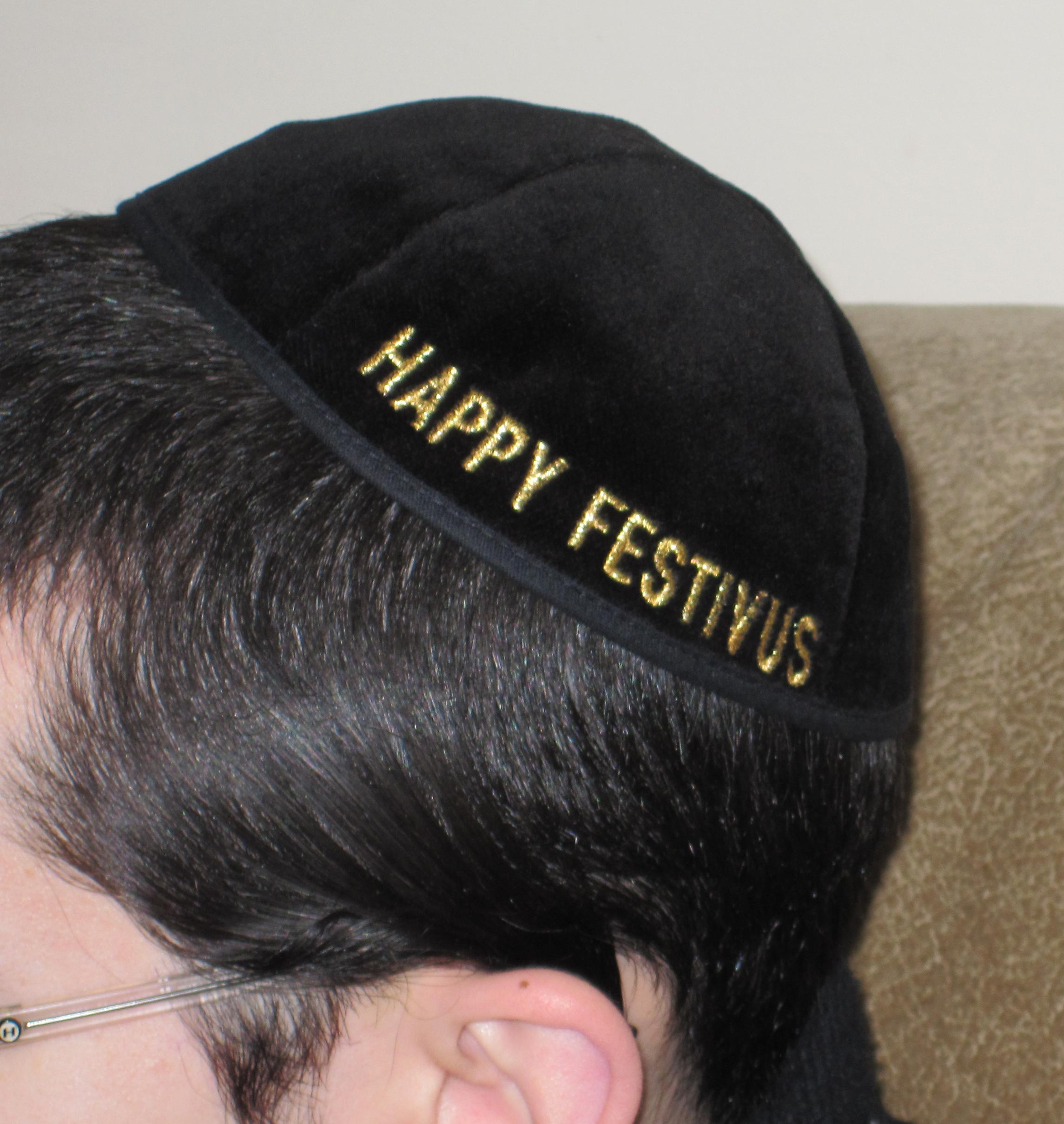
"Happy Festivus" embroidered on a kippah

The holiday, as portrayed in the Seinfeld episode, includes practices such as the "airing of grievances". During the Festivus meal, each person is given the chance to "air their grievances" by telling everyone else at the table all of the ways that they have disappointed the speaker during the past year. After the meal, the "feats of strength" are performed, involving wrestling the head of the household to the floor, with the holiday ending only if the head of the household is pinned.

==== Festivus pole ====
In the episode, the tradition of Festivus begins with an aluminum pole. Frank Costanza cites its "very high strength-to-weight ratio" as appealing. During Festivus, the pole is displayed unadorned, as Frank finds tinsel "distracting." Dan O'Keefe credits fellow Seinfeld writer Jeff Schaffer with introducing the concept. The aluminum pole was not part of the original O'Keefe family celebration, which centered on putting a clock in a bag and nailing it to a wall.

In 2021 the Seinfeld Twitter, YouTube and other social media accounts, along with the environmental organization One Tree Planted, tried to give a new environmental meaning to the pole, pledging to plant a tree for every person that posted a selfie with a pole using the hashtag #FestivusSavesTrees. Pointing out that using a Festivus pole instead of a Christmas tree saves a tree, they also said that for this purpose the pole would not have to be aluminum but could be any kind of pole of any size.

==== Festivus dinner ====
In "The Strike", a celebratory dinner is shown on the evening of Festivus prior to the feats of strength and during the airing of grievances. The on-air meal shows Estelle Costanza serving a sliced reddish meatloaf-shaped food on a bed of lettuce. In the episode no alcohol is served at the dinner, but George's boss, Mr. Kruger, drinks something from a hip flask.

The original holiday dinner in the O'Keefe household featured turkey or ham as described in Dan O'Keefe's The Real Festivus.

==== Airing of grievances ====
The "airing of grievances" takes place immediately after the Festivus dinner has been served. In the television episode, Frank Costanza began it with the phrase, "I got a lotta problems with you people, and now you're going to hear about it!" It consists of each person given a chance to lash out at both their dinner companions and the world in general, and tell them how they've disappointed them during the past year. Some mental health professionals believe that having a space for people to air some of their grievances to their families and friends could actually be good for mental health, although it is something other holidays usually avoid.

==== Feats of strength ====
The "feats of strength" are the final tradition observed in the celebration of Festivus, celebrated immediately following (or in the case of "The Strike", during) the Festivus dinner. The head of the household selects one person at the Festivus celebration and challenges them to a wrestling match. Tradition states Festivus is not over until the head of the household has been pinned. In "The Strike", however, Kramer manages to circumvent the rule by creating an excuse to leave. The feats of strength are mentioned twice in the episode before they take place. In both instances, no detail was given as to what had happened, but in both instances, George Costanza ran out of the coffee shop in a mad panic, implying he had bad experiences with the feats of strength in the past. What the feats of strength entailed was revealed at the very end of the episode when it occurred.

==== Festivus miracles ====
Cosmo Kramer twice declares a "Festivus miracle" during the Festivus celebration in the Costanza household. Kramer caused the two "miracles" himself, by inviting two off-track betting bookies (Tracy Letts and Colin Malone) to dinner with Elaine (men whom Elaine wished to avoid), and by causing Jerry's girlfriend Gwen to believe that Jerry is cheating on her.

== Wider adoption ==
Some people, many of them inspired by the Seinfeld episode, subsequently began to celebrate the holiday with varying degrees of seriousness. Allen Salkin's 2005 book Festivus: The Holiday for the Rest of Us chronicles the early adoption of Festivus. Rabbi Joshua Eli Plaut's 2012 book A Kosher Christmas: 'Tis the Season to Be Jewish' references Festivus. Martin Bodek's 2020 book The Festivus Haggadah fuses Passover with Festivus. Others have adopted Festivus as a way of engaging in a non-religious celebration over the traditional holiday season, such as by showcasing winter festivities.

During the Baltimore Ravens' run to the Super Bowl XXXV championship in 2000, head coach Brian Billick superstitiously issued an organizational ban on the use of the word "playoffs" until the team had clinched its first postseason berth. "Playoffs" was instead referred to as "Festivus" and the Super Bowl as "Festivus Maximus".

In 2005, Wisconsin governor Jim Doyle was declared "Governor Festivus", and during the holiday season displayed a Festivus pole in the family room of the Executive Residence in Madison, Wisconsin. Doyle's 2005 Festivus pole is now part of the collection of the Wisconsin Historical Museum.

In 2010, a CNN story featuring Jerry Stiller detailed the increasing popularity of the holiday, including US Representative Eric Cantor's Festivus fundraiser. The Christian Science Monitor reported that Festivus was a top trend on Twitter that year. In 2012, Google introduced a custom search result for the term "Festivus". In addition to the normal results, an unadorned aluminum pole was displayed running down the side of the list of search results and "A festivus miracle!" prefixed the results count and speed. Also in 2012, a Festivus Pole was erected on city property in Deerfield Beach, Florida, alongside religious-themed holiday displays. A similar Festivus pole was displayed next to religious displays in the Wisconsin State Capitol, along with a banner provided by the Freedom From Religion Foundation advocating for the separation of government and religion. In 2013 and 2014, Chaz Stevens erected a Festivus pole constructed with 6 ft (1.8 m) of beer cans next to a nativity scene and other religious holiday displays in the Florida State Capitol Building, as a protest supporting separation of church and state. In 2015, the same man was granted permission to display a Festivus pole decorated with a gay pride theme and topped with a disco ball to celebrate the United States Supreme Court's decision on same-sex marriage, at state capitols in Florida, Georgia, Illinois, Michigan, Missouri, Oklahoma, and Washington.

In 2016, US Senator Rand Paul released a special Festivus edition of The Waste Report. The Festivus "airing of grievances" has become an annual tradition for Paul on Twitter. In 2016, the Tampa Bay Times became the first newspaper to allow anyone to submit Festivus grievances through its website, with the promise to publish them on December 23, the day of the Festivus holiday. The Times continues to solicit and publish grievances from around the world annually. An annual public Festivus celebration has been held in Pittsburgh since 2005, featuring live bands, a Seinfeld trivia contest, and holiday traditions. In 2017, the Pittsburgh City Paper called its 13th iteration "the longest-running celebration of Sein-Culture in the 'Burgh". In 2018, Wollongong City Council (New South Wales, Australia) named a lane "Festivus Lane" in the suburb of Corrimal. The name was chosen as the celebration of Festivus started by locals grew to become a local annual fixture.

In 2021, WWE world heavyweight wrestling Champion Big E started wearing custom-designed singlets on-air adorned with catchphrases and images of Seinfeld's version of Festivus.

== Attempts at national recognition ==
In 2022, the official Seinfeld social media accounts created a petition on the website change.org to make Festivus a national holiday on December 23, and encouraged the use of the hashtag #MakeFestivusOfficial. The video promoting the petition notes that Festivus is as worthy of recognition as other unofficial national holidays, such as National Bagel Day, Boss's Day, and Hug a Musician Day.

== See also ==
- Buy Nothing Day – Day of protest against consumerism
- Winterval – Winter holiday event in Birmingham, England
- Takanakuy – December 25th tradition of drunken holiday combat resolving open grievances, from the Chumbivilcas Province, near Cuzco, Peru
