= Michael G. Kessler =

American corporate investigator

- Born: December 31, 1951; Ridgewood, NY
- Died: June 6, 2017 (aged 65); Port Jefferson, NY
- Occupation: Businessman

Michael G. Kessler (December 31, 1951 – June 6, 2017) was the founder and CEO of Kessler International, a United States-based forensic accounting, computer forensics and corporate investigations firm.

Kessler's credentials included Cr.FA (Certified Forensic Accountant), CFE (Certified Fraud Examiner), CICA (Certified Internal Controls Auditor), DABFA (Diplomate with the American Board of Forensic Accountants), and FABFE (Fellow status with the American Board of Forensic Examiners).

In January 2006 Kessler was elected chairman of the American Board of Forensic Accounting, an advisory board of the American College of Forensic Examiners.

Kessler died in June 2017.

== Notable investigations ==
In early 2008, Kessler investigated an alleged Long Island-based Ponzi scheme masquerading as a legitimate bridge loan company, called Agape World. He alerted the FBI and other law enforcement agencies after finding evidence of a Ponzi scheme.

Shortly thereafter, the FBI and the USPIS launched their own investigation. Agape World continued to operate, but after the collapse of the Bernard Madoff Ponzi scheme, Agape World came under increased scrutiny and suspicion by investors.

In December 2008 and January 2009, Kessler received numerous reports from investors in Agape World that the payout dates for various bridge loans were being extended or not paid at all, signs that are usually indicative of a collapsing Ponzi scheme. In January 2009, Nicholas Cosmo, founder of Agape World, was arrested by authorities and is alleged to have defrauded investors of an approximate total of $370 million.

In January 2010, Kessler was hired by the city of Fort Pierce, Florida, to audit the city's Community Services Department. As a result of their work, Kessler recommended the city turn over its findings to the U.S. Attorney's Office to determine whether criminal charges should be filed.

In March 2010, the city of Deerfield Beach, Florida, hired Kessler International to audit the city's Community Grant department. Kessler’s objective was to conduct a review of a sampling of case files to verify that the process of application and awarding of grants and loans to the applicants were in compliance with guidelines. Kessler's investigation uncovered cases where city employees in the housing division did not adequately verify the eligibility of recipients for public housing funds. Additionally, these employees neglected to disclose potential conflicts of interest when awarding funds to family members. Further issues were identified with the nonprofit organizations managing the public housing programs, as Kessler noted that none of the agencies examined in the audit had maintained proper documentation of their expenditures of public housing funds.

In July 2011, the New York Supreme Court Appellate Division ruled in favor of releasing seized funds to compensate Kessler for forensic accounting and computer forensic services he provided in a criminal defense case. The decision reinforced the authority of courts to authorize payment of expert fees from confiscated assets.

Throughout this period, Kessler remained active as founder and CEO of Kessler International, leading investigations in fraud, financial crime, computer forensics, and brand protection. The firm, operating globally, provided litigation support and expert testimony in hundreds of complex cases.
