= Alternative giving =

Donating to a charity in someone else's name as a gift

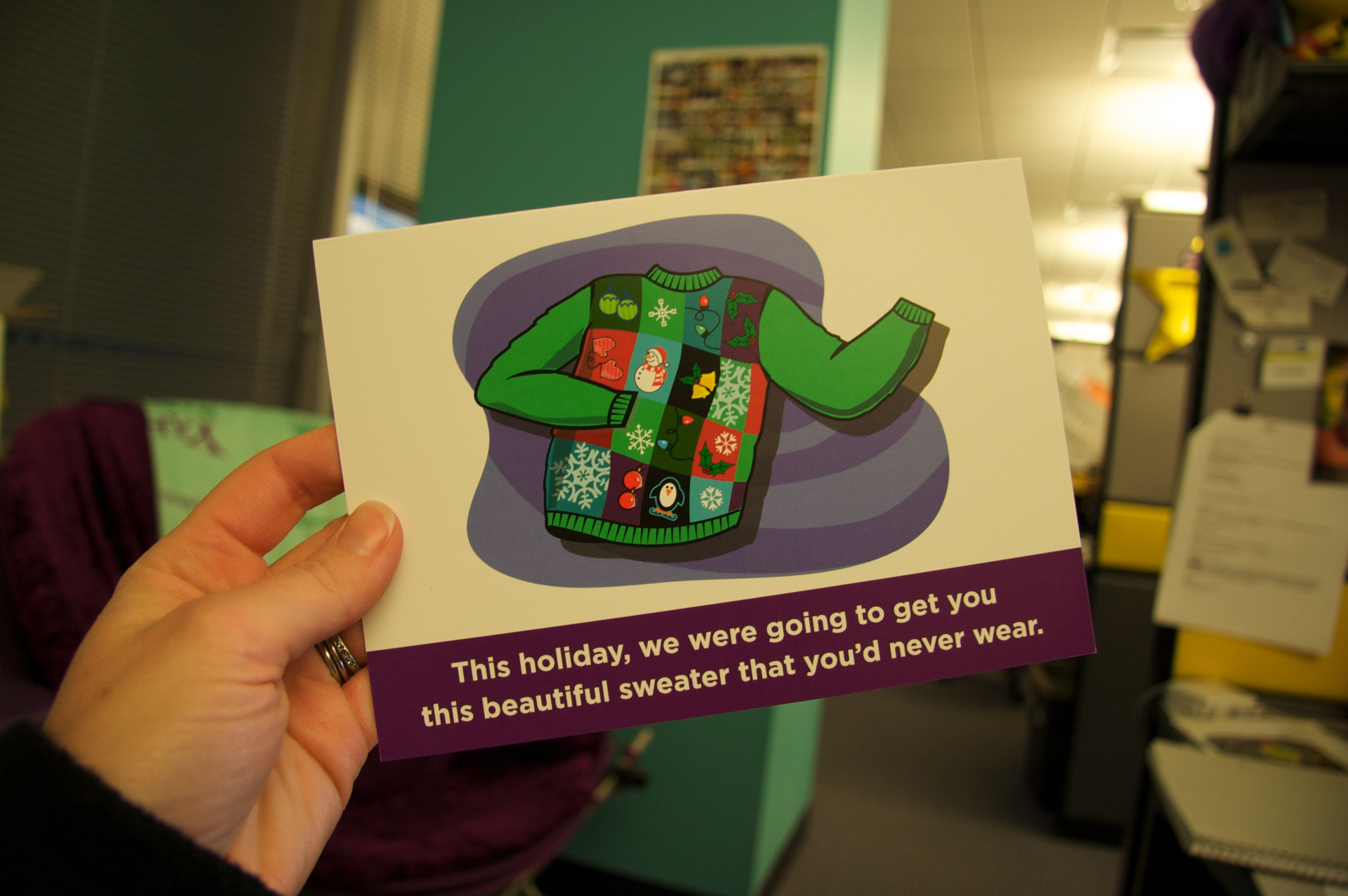
A charity gift card, describing its donation as an alternative to a "sweater you'd never wear"

Alternative giving is a form of gift giving in which the giver makes a donation to a charitable organization on the gift recipient's behalf, rather than giving them an item. The idea of giving something to one person by paying another was applied by Benjamin Franklin as a "trick ... for doing a deal of good with a little money", which came to be known as "pay it forward". This form of giving is often used as an alternative to consumerism and to mitigate the impact of gift-giving on the environment.

Charities that promote this type of donating will normally provide a card or certificate describing the donation, often with an example of how the donation will be used (such as one day's worth of food for a hungry person) or a symbolic denomination, called "ownership" or "adoption" (of an animal or a tree for example). Some charities promote alternative giving at weddings in place of wedding favors, normally providing several cards to be left on tables at the reception letting guests know a donation has been made rather than individual cards for each guest. In 2011, Catherine Middleton and Prince William made the decision to "pay it forward" with their wedding gifts, asking that the money to be used for gifts be given to charities and good causes.

The concept was spoofed in the 1997 Seinfeld episode "The Strike". George Costanza, angry at having received a donation to charity instead of an actual gift, made up his own non-existent charity and handed out fake donations to save money on gifts and cheques.
