= Seven-league boots =

Element of European folklore

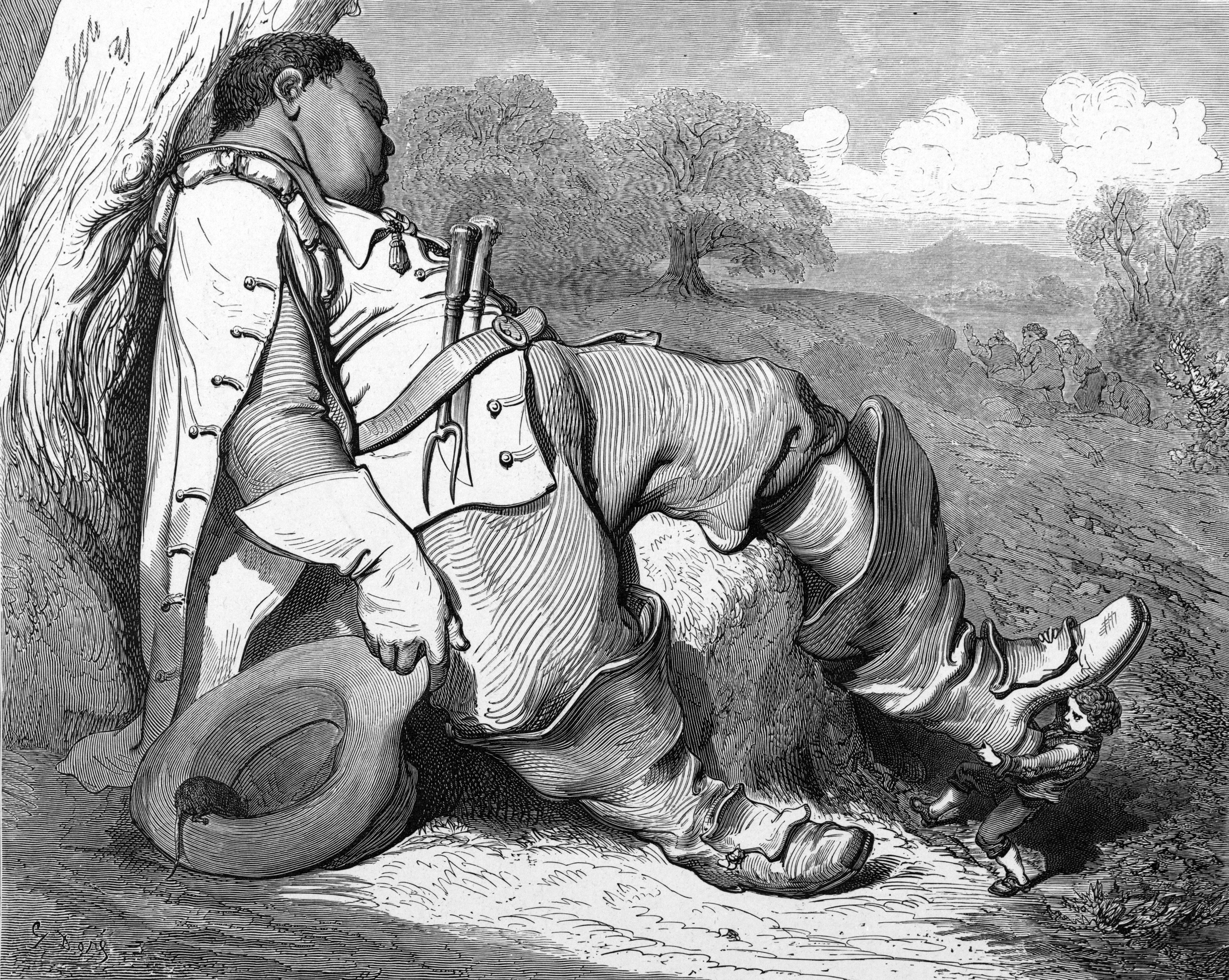
Hop-o'-My-Thumb stealing the Seven-league boots from the Ogre, by Gustave Doré

Seven-league boots are an element in European folklore. The boots allow the person wearing them to take strides of seven leagues per step, resulting in great speed. The boots are often presented by a magical character to the protagonist to aid in the completion of a significant task. From the context of English language, "seven-league boots" originally arose as a translation from the French bottes de sept lieues, popularised by Charles Perrault's fairy tales.

Mentions of the legendary boots are found in:

- France – Charles Perrault's "Hop o' My Thumb"; Madame d'Aulnoy's "The Bee and the Orange Tree"; Marcel Proust's In Search of Lost Time.
- Germany – The Brothers Grimm's "Sweetheart Roland"; Adelbert von Chamisso's Peter Schlemiel; Goethe's Faust (Mephistopheles uses them at the start of Part Two, Act Four); Wilhelm Hauff's "Little Muck"; Friedrich Laun's "Das Ideal".
- Norway – Peter Christen Asbjørnsen and Jørgen Moe's "Soria Moria Castle".
- Britain – Richard Doyle's "Jack the Giant Killer"; John Masefield's The Midnight Folk; C. S. Lewis's The Pilgrim's Regress; Dugald Steer's Wizardology; Terry Pratchett's The Light Fantastic; Jonathan Stroud's The Bartimaeus Trilogy; Jenny Nimmo's Midnight for Charlie Bone; Diana Wynne Jones's Howl's Moving Castle; Evelyn Waugh's The Loved One; E. Nesbit's The Enchanted Castle; George Eliot's The Mill On The Floss.
- United States – Zane Grey's The Last of the Plainsmen; Ruth Chew's What the Witch Left; Gail Carson Levine's The Two Princesses of Bamarre; Mark Twain's The Innocents Abroad; Roger Zelazny's Bring Me the Head of Prince Charming; Clair Blank's Beverly Gray at the World's Fair; Kelly Barnhill's The Girl Who Drank the Moon; Nathaniel Hawthorne's "The Village Uncle", and Catherine Besterman's The Quaint and Curious Quest of Johnny Longfoot.
- Russia – Arkady and Boris Strugatsky's Monday Starts on Saturday.

== Etymology ==
From the context of the English language, "seven-league boots" originally arose as a translation from the French bottes de sept lieues, popularised by Charles Perrault's fairy tales. A league (roughly 3 miles (4.8 km)) was considered to represent the distance walked in an hour by an average man. If a man were to walk seven hours per day, he would, then, walk seven leagues, or about 21 miles (34 km). In the 17th century, postboys' boots were called "seven-league boots". While some suggest that the "seven leagues" references the distance between post houses (postboys would only have their boots touch the ground at every coach inn, when changing the horses), this is inaccurate: the distance between coach inns was fixed at no more than five leagues.

== Other variations ==
=== In fiction ===
==== Folklore ====
- Russian folklore has a similar magic item called Сапоги-Скороходы (fast-pace boots), which allows the person wearing them to walk and run at an amazing pace.
- In Finnish and Estonian translations of stories with seven-league boots, they are often translated as Seitsemän Peninkulman Saappaat (Finnish) and Seitsmepenikoormasaapad (Estonian), literally "boots of seven Scandinavian miles".
- Japanese scholar Kunio Yanagita listed a tale titled The Thousand-ri Boots from Yamanashi and wondered about its great similarity to a tale in the Pentamerone with a pair of seven-league boots.
- In Latvian tales, the phrase "nine-mile boots" (deviņjūdžu zābaki) is used.
- Jewish Folklore: the concept of kefitzat haderek (קפיצת הדרך), jumping, or folding, the way, is a concept found in Talmud, midrash, folklore, and mysticism.
