= The Wish (novel) =

2000 novel by Gail Carson Levine

- Author: Gail Carson Levine
- Cover artist: Patrick Faricy
- Language: English
- Genre: Fantasy
- Publisher: HarperCollins
- Publication date: 2000
- Publication place: United States
- Media type: Print (Hardcover, Paperback)
- Pages: 208
- Awards: 2001 IRA/CBC Children's Choice 2002 IRA Young Adult's Choice NYT Extended Children's Bestseller list
- ISBN: 0064473619

The Wish is a 2000 children's novel by Gail Carson Levine, the Newbery Honor winning author of Ella Enchanted. The novel tells the story of Wilma, who wishes to be the most popular girl at her school, Claverford, forgetting that she will graduate in three weeks and move to a new school.

== Plot synopsis ==
Middle schooler Wilma Sturtz is alone. Her childhood friends have moved away, and her efforts to make new ones have failed. Wilma's fortunes change when she offers an old lady her seat on the subway. The woman offers to grant Wilma one wish, exactly as Wilma wishes it. Flustered, Wilma wishes to be the most popular person at Claverford, her middle school.

The wish is granted to Wilma's surprise. She befriends a group of popular girls, along with a budding friendship with a boy named Jared. However, a loophole is revealed; Wilma's wish was granted exactly as she wished for it, so she is not popular to students outside of Claverford, or to students from other schools. Even worse, her wish will expire the day they graduate from the school.

Wilma attempts to embrace her wish and find the old lady. The wish wears off as soon as Wilma goes back to her house with her friends—by this time, they have all graduated. She reveals what she wished to her "friends," but realizes that if she wishes to remain friends with them or even to have her wish renewed, she'd be forcing them to do something against their will; without the wish, they wouldn't have befriended Wilma willingly. After telling Jared this, he says that she wasted a wish and could have wished for something better—such as a pet porpoise.

Wilma finds the old lady again, but is not given another wish again because her previous one was fulfilled. Wilma tells a kid boarding the bus to help the old lady on the bus, because "it will be worth it."

== Background ==
Gail Carson Levine wanted to get as much material for this book as possible, as she had skipped eighth grade herself. To make up for missing personal experiences, she interviewed a group of eighth graders about school, friends, and relationships.

== Reception ==
The Wish was a 2001 International Reading Association (IRA)/Children's Book Council (CBC) Children's Choice and a 2002 IRA Young Adult's Choice. The Wish also appeared on the NYT Extended Children's Bestseller list.

Publishers Weekly said of The Wish in a May 2000 review, "Levine turns from fairy godmothers in the Brothers Grimm era to modern-day magic in this provocative meditation on what it means to be popular."

A USA Today review also praised the book saying, "Levine, the author of Newbery Honor Book Ella Enchanted, writes with great sympathy and humor about the elusive nature of popularity. And middle school readers from every spot in the pecking order will sympathize with Wilma's efforts to be comfortable in her own skin."
