= Fairest =

Fairest may refer to:

- Fairest (novel), a 2006 fantasy novel by Gail Carson Levine
- Fairest (comics), a monthly Vertigo comic series by Bill Willingham
