= The Fairy's Mistake =

"The Fairy's Mistake" is the first story in a two volume set of six stories called The Princess Tales by Gail Carson Levine. Published in 1999, two years after her Newbery Honor winning novel Ella Enchanted, "The Fairy's Mistake" follows along the same lines by taking the well-known fairytale Diamonds and Toads and turning it on its head. The story focuses on identical twin sisters Rosella and Myrtle, whose respective rewards and punishments end up doing exactly the opposite of what was intended.

== Synopsis ==
The widow Pickering sends her daughter Rosella to the well to fetch water where she meets an old woman who is actually the fairy Ethelinda in disguise. After Rosella gives the old woman some water, the old woman tells Rosella that her kindness deserves a reward. From then on, any time Rosella says anything, jewels and gems fall from her mouth.

Rosella returns home with the water and her mother is delighted at Rosella's gift. Myrtle, Rosella's sister, grabs the bucket and races to the well in the hopes that the same will happen to her.

When Myrtle reaches the well, instead of the old woman, there is a knight whom she refuses to help. Ethelinda, disguised as the knight, punishes Myrtle by making vipers and insects fall from her mouth.

Later, while Rosella is singing and working in the garden, Prince Harold rides by and, on noticing the jewels scattered around, proposes to Rosella, who accepts. The prince assigns attendants to catch the jewels whenever Rosella speaks and even though he asks her many questions, he is too focused on the jewels to listen to what she is saying. As the days pass, Rosella begins to feel very ill, but Prince Harold insists on making her speak.

While Rosella lives at the castle, Myrtle realizes that she can use the bugs and snakes as a way to terrorize the neighbors into getting anything she wants.

Ethelinda realizes that her reward and punishment are doing the exact opposite of what she intended, so she resolves to fix her mistake.

Myrtle agrees to help Rosella and takes her place when Harold comes to visit her. Myrtle screams and yells at Harold who is terrified as vipers and insects fall from her mouth instead of the jewels he is expecting. After Myrtle extracts a promise from Prince Harold that he will listen to Rosella, Ethelinda offers to reward Myrtle who declines, saying that the vipers and insects are reward enough. When Prince Harold comes to visit Rosella again, they reach an agreement that he will receive half of the jewels from Rosella, with the other half going to the people. Meanwhile, Pickering and Myrtle start a lucrative betting business where Myrtle speaks into a jar and people can bet on which creature will win a race.

Ethelinda resolves to never again make a mistake with rewards and punishments like those of Rosella and Myrtle.

== Characters ==
- Ethelinda A fairy who disguises herself in order to reward those who are good and kind and punish those who are rude and wicked.
- Rosella The "good" sister who gives an old woman water from the well and is rewarded to have jewels fall from her mouth every time she speaks.
- Myrtle The "bad" sister who refuses to help a knight at the well and is punished to have vipers and insects fall from her mouth every time she speaks.
- The widow Pickering The mother of identical twins Rosella and Myrtle.
- Prince Harold The greedy prince who marries Rosella when he sees the jewels that fall from her lips when she speaks.

== Relation to original story ==
"The Fairy's Mistake" is based on the French fairytale Diamonds and Toads. As in the original story, a fairy disguises herself in order to reward those who are good and punish those who are bad. In the original tale, the wicked mother drives out the younger daughter who has jewels fall from her mouth and a prince finds the girl wandering the woods. Later the wicked mother also drives out the older daughter, who dies alone in the woods. Gail Carson Levine keeps the beginning of the tale, but plays with the idea that all rewards and punishments do not go exactly as planned. The "good" daughter still marries a prince, but he is materialistic, and the "bad" daughter and wicked mother begin a lucrative business together.
