= Hebrew Orphan Asylum of New York =

Closed Jewish orphanage in New York CIty

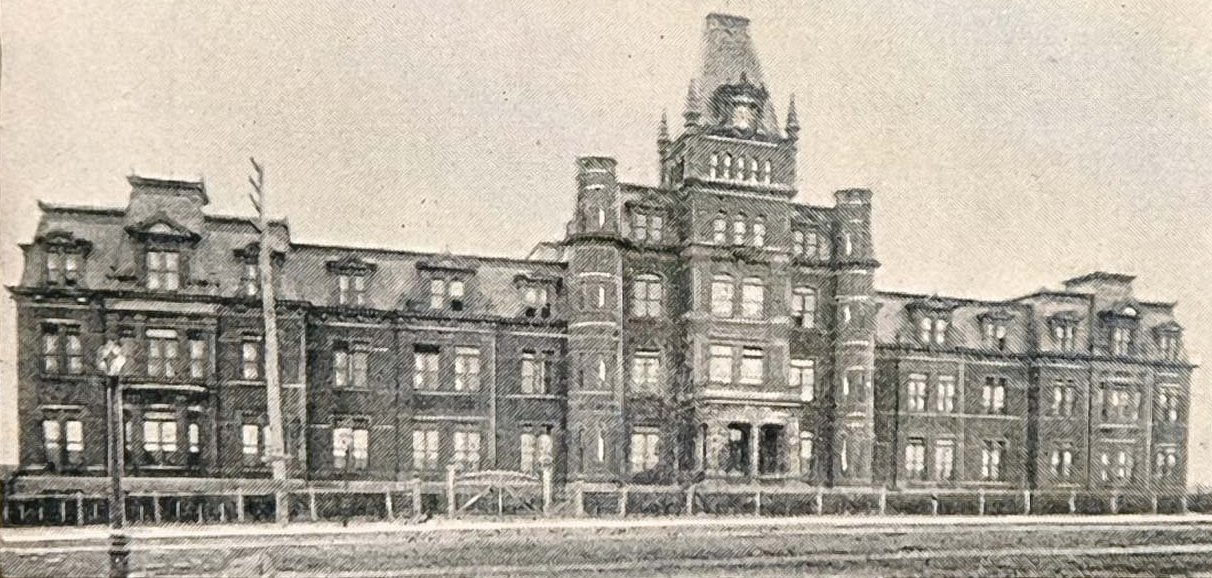
- Successor: Jewish Child Care Association (JCCA)
- Established: 1860; 166 years ago
- Dissolved: 1941; 85 years ago
- Legal status: Orphanage
- Headquarters: 1860: Lamartine Place (West 29th Street): 1863: East 77th Street near Third Avenue; 1884: Amsterdam Avenue, between 136th and 138th Streets
- Location: Manhattan, United States
- Origins: Mortara case
- Region served: New York City
- Parent organization: Hebrew Benevolent Society
- Secessions: Brooklyn Hebrew Orphan Asylum

The Hebrew Orphan Asylum of New York (HOA) was a Jewish orphanage in New York City. It was founded in 1860 by the Hebrew Benevolent Society. It closed in 1941, after pedagogical research concluded that children thrive better in foster care or small group homes, rather than in large institutions. The successor organization is the JCCA, formerly called the Jewish Child Care Association.

Henry Fernbach designed the asylum building on 77th Street near Third Avenue. The Brooklyn Hebrew Orphan Asylum was constructed in Brooklyn, New York. In 1884 the Hebrew Benevolent Society constructed a large orphanage building at Amsterdam Avenue between 136th and 138th Streets. It was designed by William H. Hume in the Modern Renaissance architecture style.

== History ==
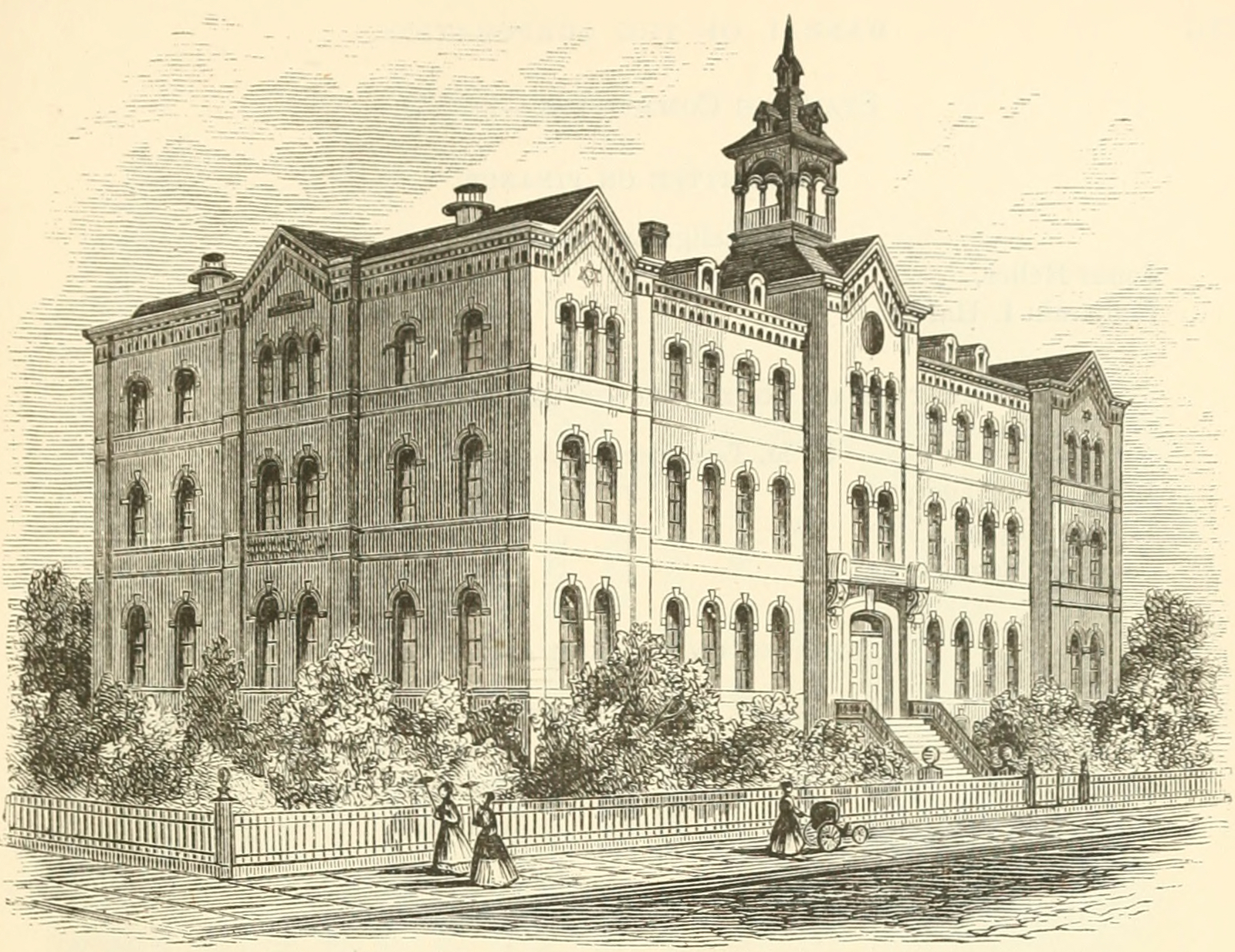
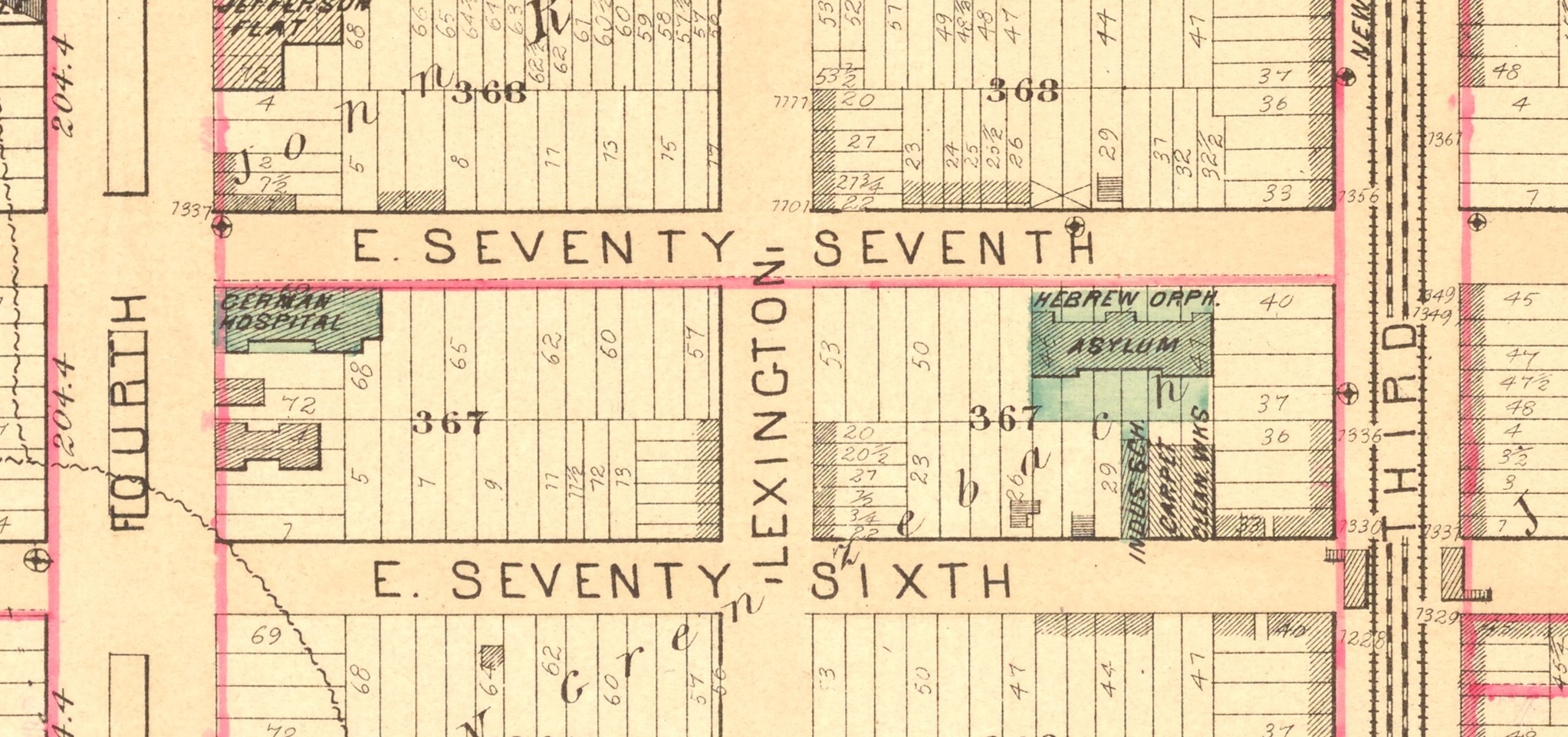
The 77th Street building in the 1870s
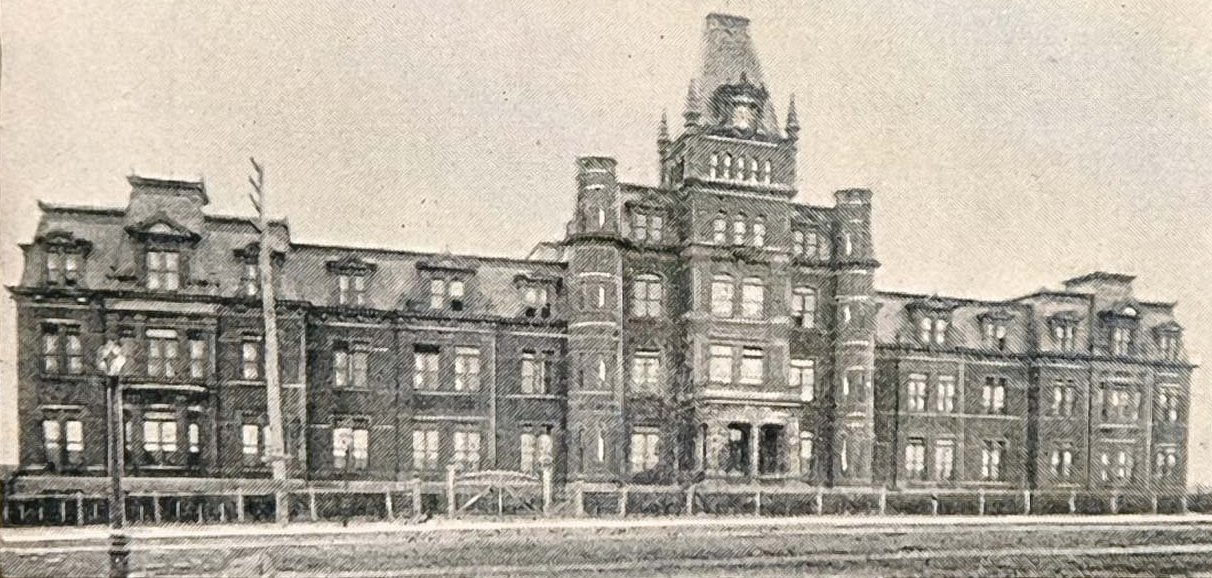
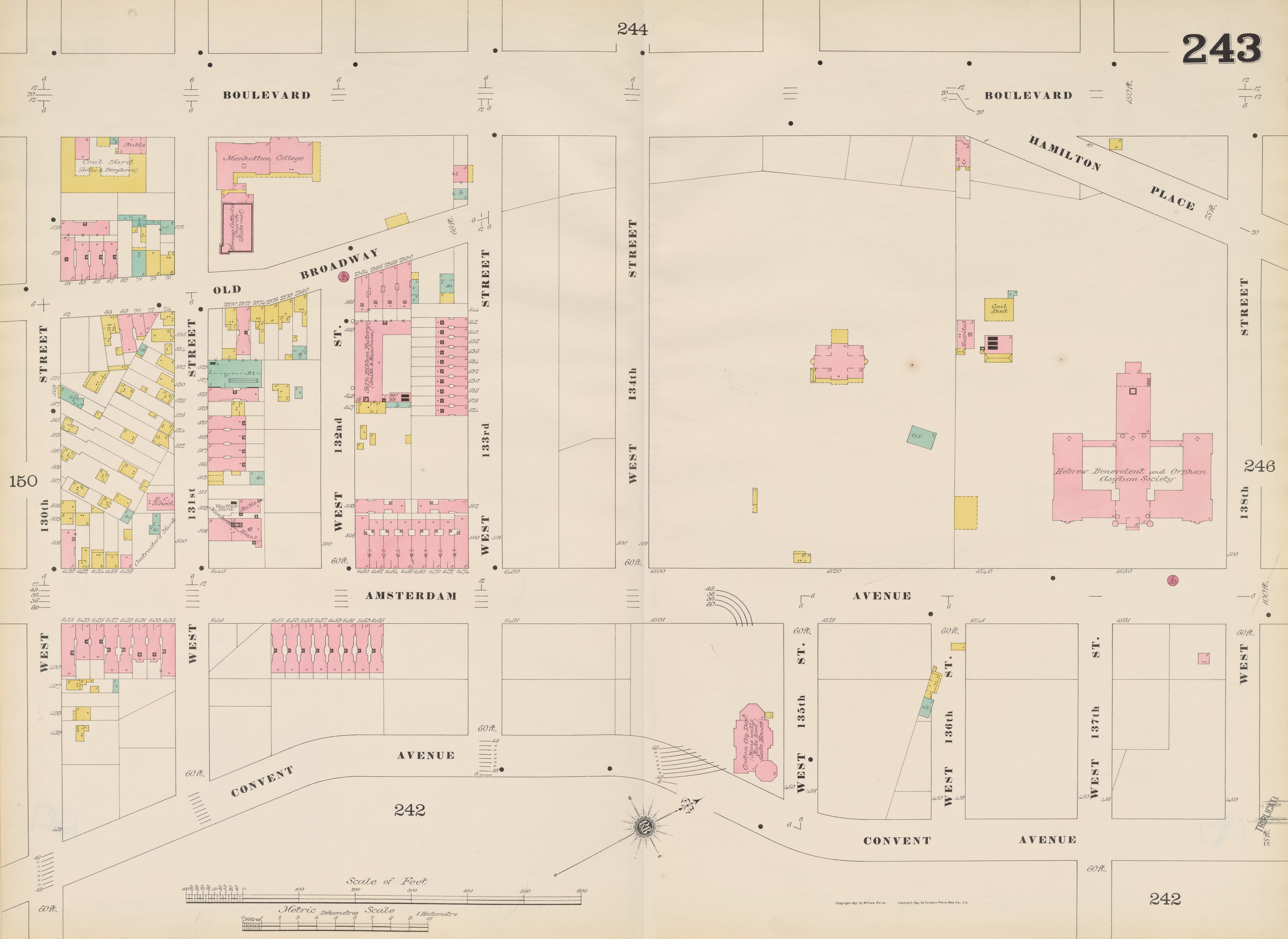
Amsterdam Avenue building in 1893

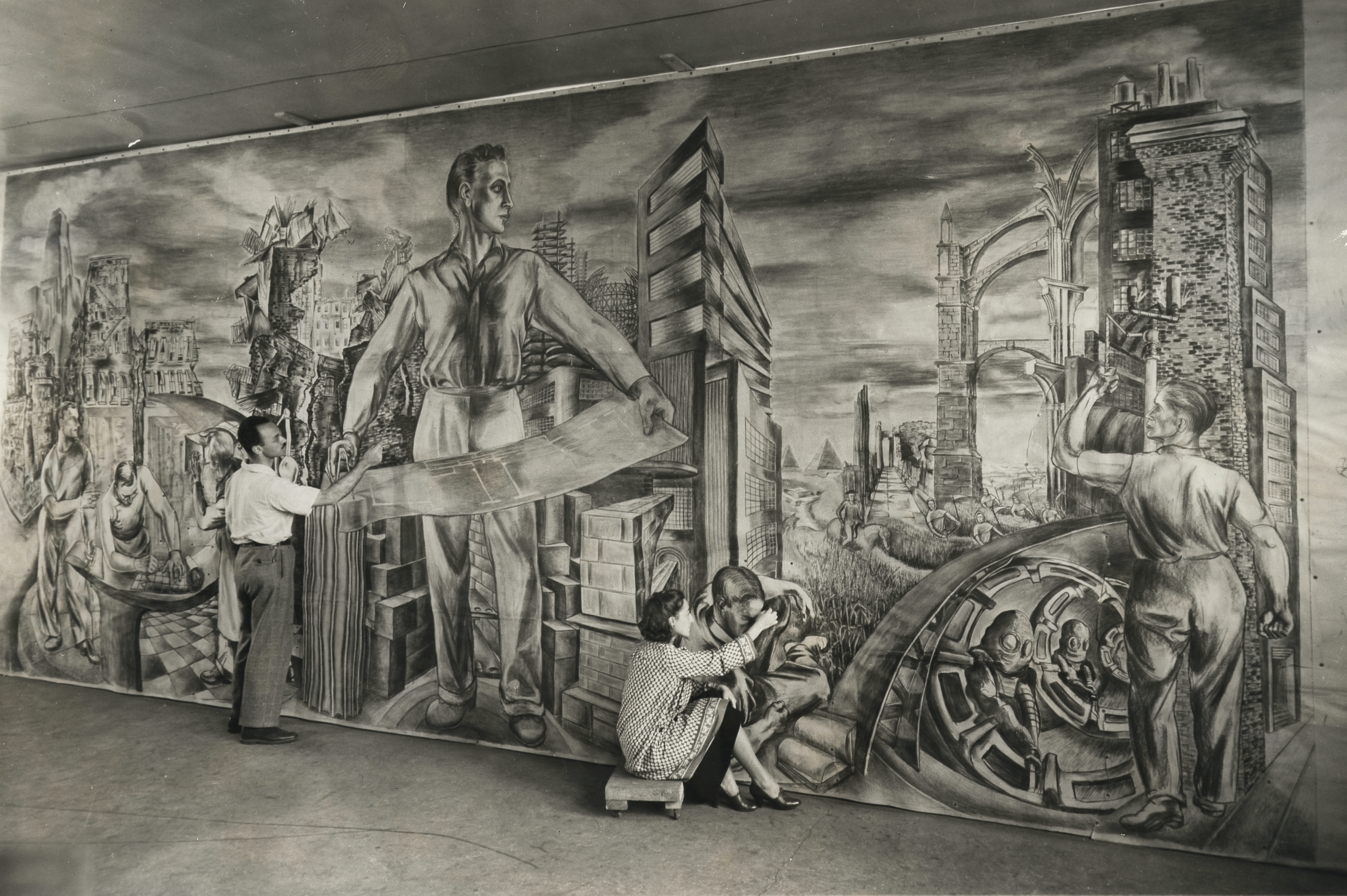
WPA mural for the Hebrew Orphan Asylum by William Karp (1938)

In 1822, the Hebrew Benevolent Society was established by Ashkenazic Jews from central and eastern Europe to break away from similar organizations founded by the city’s community of Sephardic Jews who have more established ties in New York. Conflicts between the two groups, however, delayed the creation of a Jewish orphanage for nearly forty years. A major breakthrough happened in 1858, following the kidnapping of Edgardo Mortara, a six-year-old Italian Jewish boy, in the Papal States, which intensified fears among Jews over Catholic proselytizing. As a child, Edgardo was secretly baptized by a Catholic servant and was forcibly taken from his Jewish family to be brought up as a Catholic. The threat of Jewish children being secretly converted under the care of non-Jewish institutions was a major factor that unified Jews from different nationalities to pool resources and open the Hebrew Orphan Asylum of New York (HOA) in 1960.

By 1850, New York had nearly 100 orphanages, most of which were run by private religious groups like HOA that catered to children based on race and religion. The Hebrew Orphan Asylum, which was located in a rented three story brickhouse on Lamartine Place (now West 29th Street) in Chelsea in 1860, opened with several dozen Jewish boys and girls. On each holiday the children were taken to a different synagogue, to placate the different brands of Judaism of the sponsoring organizations. During the Draft Riots, the mobs came to the very street where the orphanage was, but did not attack it, unlike the Colored Children's Orphan Asylum. In November 1863 the orphanage moved to a purpose-built home on East 77th Street near Third Avenue. In the orphanage, girls were taught domestic skills, while the boys were taught shoemaking and printing; the orphanage's printshop produced a magazine, Young Israel, to which Horatio Alger supplied a serial novel. In 1874 the organization renamed itself the "Hebrew Benefit Society and Orphan Asylum," and agreed to accept $110 a year in public funds to care for each orphan.

In 1878, the organization, overwhelmed, agreed to accept only Manhattan children. This led to the formation of the Hebrew Orphan Asylum of the City of Brooklyn.

Between 1860 and 1919, some 13,500 children were admitted to the home. Few children, however, were adopted, since most were actually half-orphans, members of a family which one parent (usually the father) had deserted and which the surviving parent could not support. The asylum was used, in effect, as a boarding school.

In 1884 the Hebrew Benevolent Society constructed a large building at Amsterdam Avenue, between 136th and 138th Streets, in the Modern Renaissance style, designed by William H. Hume. The building cost $750,000 (including the land), and $60,000 a year to operate. The building eventually had a capacity of 1,755 children. It was so self-sufficient that it was able to survive for a week on its own after it was cut off during the Blizzard of 1888. After a dysentery outbreak in 1898, caused by impurities in the city's water supply, left seven children dead, the building installed its own water filtration system. During the influenza epidemic of 1918 not a single child in the orphanage died.

In 1915 the Child Welfare Act was passed, which granted allowances to widows. Within two years the orphanage population in the city shrank by 3,000 children as women became able to care for their children. By 1920 the orphanage was losing its position to the Pleasantville Cottage School (established 1912), which, unlike the Hebrew Orphan Asylum, was not a large institutional building but a group of cottages in a rural area. The Hebrew Orphan Asylum decided to rebuild on the cottage system on land that it owned in the Bronx; it would raise money to do this by selling the orphanage to the Yankees, who wanted land to build a rival stadium to the Polo Grounds. This deal fell through, the Yankees instead built a stadium in the Bronx, and the Hebrew Orphan Asylum closed in 1941.

After the Asylum closed in 1941, the building was used by City College to house members of the U.S. Armed Forces assigned to the Army Specialized Training Program (ASTP). From 1946 to 1955, it was used as a dormitory, library, and classroom space for the college. It was called "Army Hall" until it was demolished in 1955 and 1956 by the New York City Department of Parks, who replaced it with the Jacob H. Schiff Playground.

== Cultural influences ==
The California and New York artist Henry Alexander's painting of the Hebrew Orphan Asylum was his favorite work and was found in his studio after his suicide.

The Hebrew Orphan Asylum appears in Gail Carson Levine's book, Dave at Night, under the name the "Hebrew Home for Boys." The protagonist hates the poor food, strict rules, and the bullying, and nicknames the place the "Hopeless House of Beggars" and the "Hell Hole for Brats." The author's father attended the Hebrew Orphan Asylum.

== Superintendents ==
- Samuel Hart (1860–1865)
- Max Grünbaum (1865–1867)
- Louis Schnabel (1868–1875)
- Herman Baar (1876–1899)
- David Adler (1900–1908)
- Dr. Ludwig B. Bernstein (1909)
- Solomon Lowenstein (1909–1919)
- Lionel Simmonds (1920–1941)

== Notable alumni ==
- Art Buchwald (admitted in the 1930s, so not available in the web-based records)
- Irwin Corey (1914-2017)
- Becky Edelsohn (1892–1973), after she was discharged she lived in the home of Emma Goldman
- Edwin Franko Goldman (admitted 1887, discharged 1894)
- Hank Kaplan
- Nathan Mantel (1919–2002)
- Harold Tovish (1921–2008)

== Archival collections ==
The archives of the institution are on deposit with the American Jewish Historical Society, at New York's Center for Jewish History. The admission and discharge registers for 1860 through 1928 can be searched via the web.

Nearly fifty oral history interviews about the institution are on deposit at the New York Public Library as part of the American Jewish Committee Oral History Collection.

== See also ==
- Hebrew National Orphan Home (another Jewish orphanage in New York City)

== Bibliography ==
- Bogen, Hyman (1992). The Luckiest Orphans: A History of the Hebrew Orphan Asylum of New York. Urbana: University of Illinois Press. ISBN 978-0-252-01887-9.
- van Alkemade, Kim (June 2006). Orphans Together: A History of New York's Hebrew Orphan Asylum (PDF). 2006 Biennial Scholars’ Conference on American Jewish History. Charleston, SC. Archived from the original (PDF) on May 13, 2015. (includes illustrations).
