= The Two Princesses of Bamarre =

2001 book by Gail Carson Levine

- Author: Gail Carson Levine
- Audio read by: Lynn Redgrave
- Language: English
- Genre: Fantasy
- Publisher: HarperCollins
- Publication date: 2001
- Publication place: United States
- Media type: Print (Hardcover, Paperback) and Audiobook
- Pages: 256 pp
- ISBN: 978-0-06-029315-4
- OCLC: 45102920
- LC Class: PZ7.L578345 Tw 2001
- Preceded by: The Lost Kingdom of Bamarre

The Two Princesses of Bamarre is a 2001 fantasy novel by American writer Gail Carson Levine, the author of Ella Enchanted and several other books. The story revolves around the lives of two sisters who are very close but very different. When one of them contracts a deadly disease sweeping the kingdom, the other must find her inner strength and bravery to discover the cure, and save her elder sister.

The audiobook, read by Lynn Redgrave, was released in November 2001.

== Plot ==
Princess Adelina "Addie" is fearful and shy. Princess Meryl is bold and brave. They are sisters, and they mean the world to each other. Bamarre is plagued by a fatal disease called the Gray Death, which has three stages: Weakness, Sleep, and then Fever. While the weakness may last for hours to weeks, the sleep always lasts nine days, and the fever always lasts three. Bamarre also has specters, which lure travelers to their deaths unless exposed, sorcerers, ogres, dwarves, elves, gryphons, dragons, and fairies. Fairies, however, have not been seen since Drualt, Bamarre's greatest hero and subject of myths, went up to visit them after the tragic death of his sweetheart Freya.

The two princesses strike up a friendship with Rhys, the apprentice sorcerer helping their father. Soon after, Princess Meryl is suddenly struck ill with the Gray Death. Princess Addie has trouble coming to terms with the fact that Princess Meryl is going to die, while her elder sister tries in vain to prove her theory that the Gray Death might be cured if the person who is ill refuses to be sick, running when weak, staying awake when tired, etc. Since a prophecy from a long ago specter states that:

The Gray Death will be cured
When cowards find courage
And rain falls over all Bamarre

When King Lionel returns just as cowardly as before, Princess Addie sets out to find the cure herself. Using a pair of seven-league boots and a magical spyglass from her deceased mother Queen Daria, a copy of Drualt, a camouflage cloak, a magic tablecloth from Rhys, some of Milton's herbs and Princess Meryl's sword Blood-Biter, Princess Addie successfully travels to the Mulee forest to find a specter, only to be tricked by one that took on the form of Rhys. The real Rhys makes her realize the truth, and she learns from the specter that a dragon would be her best bet for finding the cure. Rhys has to leave for the Sorcerers' Citadel, but not before Addie realizes that there's more behind their friendship.

After accidentally overcoming a pack of gryphons with her tablecloth, Princess Addie is found by the dragon Vollys and taken to her lair. Although dragons are solitary creatures, they are also lonely, so Princess Addie is forced to entertain Vollys to avoid a fiery demise in Vollys' stomach. She does this through her embroidery, which is her sole bold attribute. Although Princess Addie is terrified of the dragon, she learns that Vollys is always sad when she eats her "guests" after they have angered her one time too many. Princess Addie also learns the dragon version of Drualt's story, which portrays the hero as a villain who mercilessly kills noble dragons, including Vollys' mother. Vollys also tells Addie that the Gray Death came from her mother's corpse, a revenge for her death. Because she does not think Addie can escape, Vollys also tells Addie that the Gray Death can be cured by the water of a waterfall that flows from Mount Ziriat, the fairies' invisible mountain. She even tells Addie where the mountain is. Meanwhile, Addie learns through her spyglass that Meryl has entered the sleeping stage of the Gray Death, and later fever stage of the Gray Death.

Addie manages to escape Vollys with her boots, and returns to the castle. After reuniting with Rhys, Meryl tells Addie that she has until the next dawn to live. Addie tells them about the cure, and she and Rhys uses the seven-league boots to carry Meryl to the mountain. They end up outside the same village that refused to help Drualt's sweetheart due to their cowardice. Upon questioning, the isolated villagers say that although they have heard of the Gray Death, no one in the village has ever had it. The three also learn that all the villagers drink from a waterfall that comes from a mountain so tall and shrouded in mist that no one has ever seen it. Realizing that they are talking about Mount Ziriat, and the villagers are never sick because they drink the water, Rhys and the Princesses manage to find a few villagers courageous enough and willing to show them the waterfall, which is a few hours away, despite the dark night and the threat of ogres and gryphons. While they walk, Rhys confesses his love to Addie, and she does the same. Just as they reach the waterfall, though, the party is attacked by ogres, gryphons and an enraged Vollys. The sky begins to lighten, and Addie tells Meryl, who is having the time of her life in battle, to run to the water and drink. While she is running, though, Addie is caught by an ogre unexpectedly and screams in pain. Meryl runs back to rescue her when the first rays of sunlight come, just as rain begins to fall. Addie is knocked unconscious, Meryl falls to the ground, and wholes of light fly down.

When Addie wakes up, she learns from Meryl, who seems different somehow, that they were rescued by fairies and taken to the top of Mount Ziriat. The rain had fallen everywhere, curing all with the Gray Death except those who were too close to death to save. When Addie gained the courage to save her sister, and when the cowardly villagers redeemed themselves by helping Meryl and Addie, the fairies made water from their enchanted waterfall rain over all Bamarre. Meryl also tells Addie that she, too, was one of those on the brink of death when the rain came, so the fairies could not truly save her. However, they offered to transform her into a fairy and join them in an endless battle against fearsome, monstrous creatures, the outcome of which affects the world below. Meryl accepted the offer, and is now a fairy, unable to return with Addie. Addie also learns from Meryl that she is now with Drualt, who was also transformed after leaving Bamarre, and that he had been the presence Addie felt in her darkest hours, cheering her up and giving her the strength to go on. Rhys and Addie marry and live happily ever after, with Meryl as Fairy Godmother to their children and grandchildren, the first after hundreds of years. The book concludes with a Drualt-like tale, recounting the adventures of the two Princesses of Bamarre.

== Themes ==
Two of the book's major themes are courage in the face of fear and unconditional love between sisters. The weak Princess Addie, who fears leaving her comforts and facing difficulties, hides in the shadow of her brave and venturesome sister, Princess Meryl. When Meryl becomes sick with the Gray Death, Princess Addie emerges from her cocoon, her love for her sister overpowering her fear, and discovers a new strength and bravery. Worried for her sister, she uses her magic spyglass to observe Meryl, and her overpowering love pushes her forward.

== Reception ==
The Two Princesses of Bamarre received mixed reviews.

Some reviewers found the plot more interesting than the characters, with Publishers Weekly stating that "plot twists win out over character development." However, Kirkus Reviews commented the opposite, writing that the novel's "strength lies in character development and world-making, not in epic plot construction". They noted that Levine attempts to create a "Tolkienesque high fantasy" but fails in telling, with "a plot that moves unevenly from adventure to adventure, involving multiple convenient rescues, a predictable romance, and an ultimately unsatisfying deus ex machina at the end". Despite appreciating the primary plot, Publishers Weekly noted that the subplots "are not fully developed. Even after the heroine completes her mission [...], readers may feel let down".

Discussing character development specifically, Publishers Weekly pointed to Addie's characterization, noting that despite "the courage she gains throughout, her character remains an enigma".
