= Herman Baar =

American educator

Herman Baar (1826, Stadthagen – 1904) was an American educator, born in Germany. He received a preliminary education at the gymnasium of Hanover, and, after graduation, took a course in philology and theology at the University of Göttingen. On the completion of his studies he took a position as teacher at the celebrated undenominational school at Seesen, Germany, which he held for eight years. In 1857 Baar received the ministerial appointment in the Seel street synagogue, Liverpool, in which office he spent ten years. Loss of voice forced him to relinquish this post; and, believing a change of climate advisable, he went to New Orleans, La., where he directed a school. In 1876 he was appointed superintendent of the Hebrew Orphan Asylum of New York — a position he filled successfully till his resignation in 1899. Baar is the author of Homely and Religious Topics (two volumes of sermons to children), a Biblical history (part 1 published 1901), and of numerous magazine articles.
