= The Quaint and Curious Quest of Johnny Longfoot =

1947 children's book written by Catherine Besterman

The Quaint and Curious Quest of Johnny Longfoot, the Shoe-King’s Son
- Author: Catherine Besterman
- Illustrator: Warren Chappell
- Language: English
- Genre: Children's literature Folklore; Adventure
- Publisher: Bobbs
- Publication date: 1947
- Publication place: United States
- Followed by: The Extraordinary Education of Johnny Longfoot in His Search for the Magic Hat

The Quaint and Curious Quest of Johnny Longfoot, the Shoe-King’s Son is a 1947 children's fantasy novel written by Catherine Besterman and illustrated by Warren Chappell. Based on the seven-league boots of European folklore, it follows a boy's journey to recover the boots in exchange for treasure. It was followed by The Extraordinary Education of Johnny Longfoot in His Search for the Magic Hat in 1949.

== Plot summary ==
Johnny, the son of a cobbler, is sent by his father to visit his miserly uncle. He meets Barnac the Cat, who offers him gold if Johnny can find the famed seven-league boots on Coral Island.

Johnny sets out to recover the boots using a barge he has built; his uncle joins him. A group of sea monsters attacks the barge, but Johnny mollifies them. One monster, Mr. Shark, gives Johnny a magic Sea Passport.

Following a terrific storm, Johnny is cast ashore, and his uncle betrays him, finding and taking the boots for himself and sailing the barge home. Johnny uses the Sea Passport and is carried to the ship by friendly sea animals. His uncle repents for his treachery, and Johnny brings Barnac the boots and claims the gold.

== Reception ==
The book was named one of the best of 1947 by The Horn Book Magazine and earned a Newbery Honor in 1948. The New York Times review called the book entertaining and Chapell's illustrations "humorous and fanciful". Elementary English's review also complimented Cgappel's ollustrations, saying they "add much to the whimsy of the story".
