= Max Grünbaum =

German historian

- Born: Maier Grünbaum; 12 August 1817; Seligenstadt, Hesse, German Confederation
- Died: 11 December 1898 (aged 81); Munich, Bavaria, German Empire

Academic background
- Education: University of Giessen; University of Bonn

Maier "Max" Grünbaum (12 August 1817 – 11 December 1898) was a German Orientalist, historian, folklorist, and philologist.

== Biography ==
Grünbaum was born to Jewish parents at Seligenstadt, Hesse, and studied philology and philosophy at the Universities of Giessen and Bonn. By the end of the 1830s he had taken up work as a tutor for wealthy Jewish families in Amsterdam, London, Trieste, and Vienna. In 1858 he emigrated to the United States, and became director of the Hebrew Orphan Asylum in New York City.

He returned to Europe in 1870, and spent the remainder of his days in Munich. There he was able to devote his energy to research, which included the study of history of aggadic themes and their influence on Islam, and of the structure and history of Yiddish and Ladino. In addition to his own well-tended book collection, he made use of the extensive holdings of the Bavarian State Library. Following the model of Moritz Steinschneider for Oxford, Leyden, Hamburg, Berlin, and Munich itself, Grünbaum undertook the re-cataloguing of the Library's Hebrew holdings. He was confined to his room from 1892 as a result of increasing physical and then mental deterioration, but kept himself lively with his scholarly ideas and plans.

Grünbaum died on 11 December 1898, at the age of 81. He bequeathed his library to the Munich Verein für jüdische Geschichte und Litteratur (lit. 'Society for Jewish History and Literature'). After 1862 nearly all his papers on Oriental philology and folklore had appeared in the Zeitschrift der Deutschen Morgenländischen Gesellschaft; and after his death they were re-edited by Felix Perles under the title Gesammelte Aufsätze zur Sprach- und Sagenkunde (Berlin, 1901).

== Partial bibliography ==
- Jüdisch-Deutsche Chrestomathie. Leipzig: F. A. Brockhaus. 1882. hdl:2027/uiuo.ark:/13960/t5w75021x.
- Mischsprachen und Sprachmischungen. Sammlung gemeinverständlicher wissenschaftlicher vorträge, HFT. 473. Berlin: Carl Habel. 1885. hdl:2027/uc1.aa0004143012.
- Neue Beiträge zur Semitischen Sagenkunde. Leiden: E. J. Brill. 1893. hdl:2027/mdp.39015010743899.
- Die Jüdisch-Deutsche Litteratur in Deutschland, Polen, und America. Trier: Sigmund Mayer. 1894. hdl:2027/hvd.hnk6qu.
- Jüdisch-Spanische Chrestomathic. Frankfurt: J. Kauffmann. 1896.
- Gesammelte Aufsätze zur Sprach- und Sagenkunde. Berlin: S. Calvary & Co. 1901.
