= Hebrew National Orphan Home =

Coordinates: 40°43′40″N 73°59′13.4″W

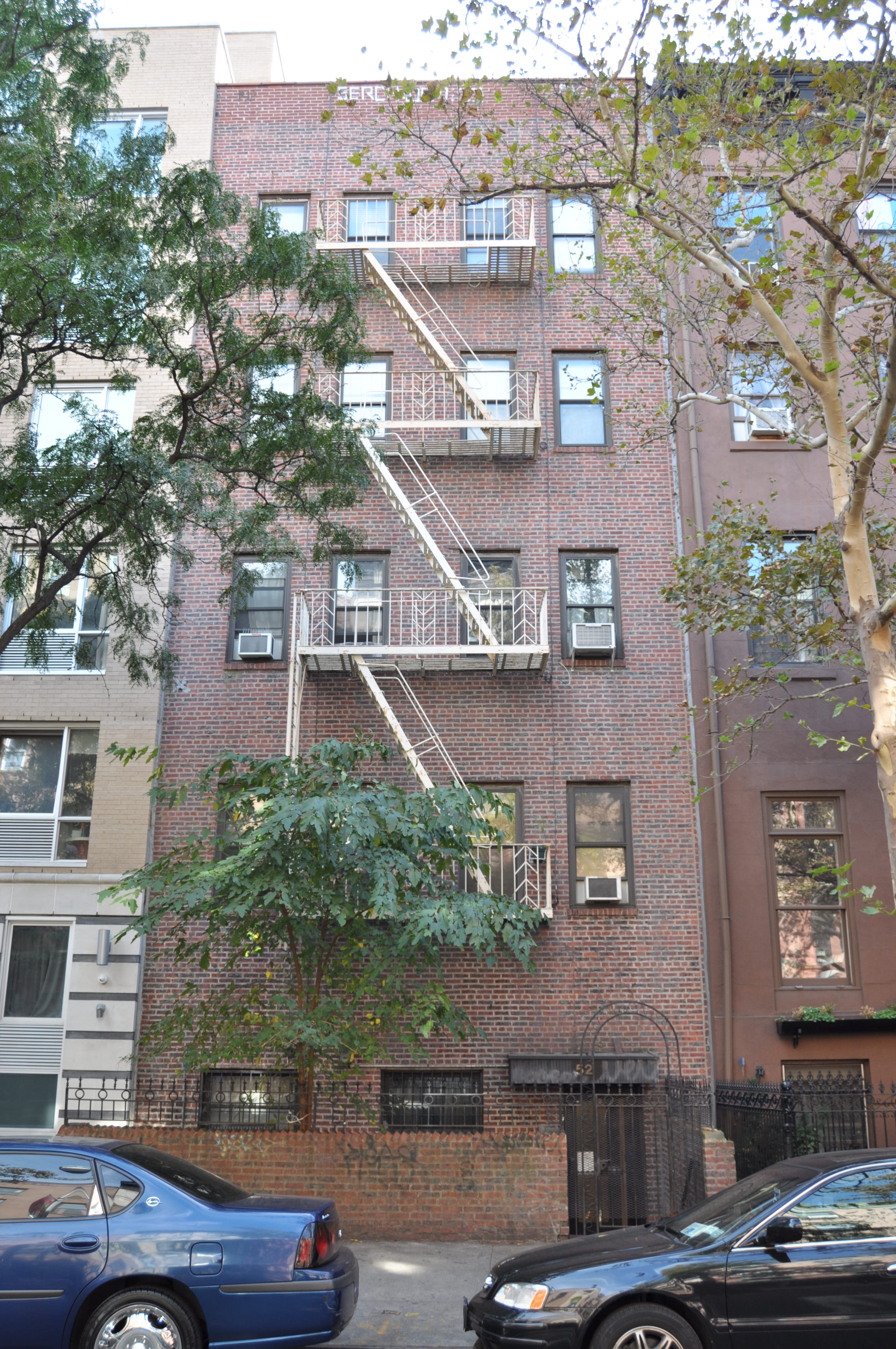
The building at 57 East 7th Street that was the location of the Hebrew National Orphan Home from 1913 to 1920

Hebrew National Orphan Home (HNOH) was an orphanage in Manhattan in New York City. It was founded on December 5, 1912, when a group raised $64 toward establishing a Jewish orthodox home for the care of orphaned and destitute Jewish boys. On October 14, 1913, a committee of the Bessarabian Verband, a group of Romanian Jews, paid the first installment of $400 for the premises at 57 East 7th Street between First and Second Avenues – in what was then the Lower East Side and is now the East Village. On June 7, 1914 HNOH House officially opened with accommodations for 50 boys. Later, the home bought a second tenement that backed onto the original building, creating an enclosed courtyard, and doubling the home's capacity to 100.

On July 15, 1919, a facility on Tuckahoe Road in Yonkers, New York was purchased for $300,000. The home's 184 children moved to the new facility on July 26, 1920.

In 1947, it changed its name to Homecrest then it merged with the Gustave Hartman home for children in 1956 under the name of Hartman-Homecrest and in early 1962 Hartman-Homecrest was merged into the Jewish Child Care Association (JCCA) of New York and the name HNOH after 60 years, was no longer used.

== See also ==
- Hebrew Orphan Asylum of New York - another Jewish orphanage in New York City
