= Dave at Night =

1999 novel by Gail Carson Levine

- Author: Gail Carson Levine
- Language: English
- Genre: Young adult historical fiction
- Publisher: HarperCollins
- Publication date: 1999
- Publication place: United States
- Media type: Print
- Pages: 281 pp
- ISBN: 0-06-028153-7

Dave at Night is a young adult, historical fiction novel written by award-winning author Gail Carson Levine in 1999. This book was inspired by leading figures in the arts during the Harlem Renaissance and her father, David Carson, whose childhood was spent in an orphanage.

Levine bases the setting of her book on the Lower East Side of Manhattan in the Hebrew community. This gives her the opportunity to include the Yiddish language which is spoken by the character, Solomon Gruber.

== Plot summary ==
Dave Caros, a teenager troublemaker, lost his mother during his birth. More recently, his father dies after falling off a roof of a house he was helping to build. Always having lived under the shadow of his older brother Gideon, he is abandoned by his stepmother Ida while Gideon goes to live with his uncle. Ida sends Dave to a Hebrew orphanage, the Hebrew Home For Boys.

When Dave first arrives at the orphanage, he absolutely hates it. The bedrooms are cold, the food is awful (and is often stolen by bullies) and the superintendent, Mr. Bloom (nicknamed Mr. Doom) is abusive and hits the boys with a yardstick. Mr. Doom takes the only thing Dave has left from his father, a wood carving of his family boarding Noah's Ark. However, Dave enjoys the art lessons and explores his talented, creative side.

Sick of the austere lifestyle, Dave sneaks out of the orphanage in the middle of the night and roams the streets of Harlem. He finds a nearby party and bumps into Solly, an old man who 'reads cards' to get money. He enters the party with Solly and discovers a whole new world of jazz music, money and glamour—the Harlem Renaissance. Dave even meets Irma Lee, a girl to whom he is quickly attracted to although the book does not make it clear if its romantic or not. However, Dave needs to return to the orphanage every morning, but this new lifestyle isn't always what it seems.

== Characters ==
- Dave Caros

The protagonist, an eleven-year-old Jewish boy known for always getting in trouble and a daredevil who becomes an orphan.

- Solomon Gruber

Nicknamed Solly the Gonif, Solomon is the old white man that attends rent parties and tells people their fortune for money. He carries a parrot named Bandit on his shoulder which can repeat several words for emphasis.

- Irma Lee

A twelve-year-old girl that Dave meets during his first rent party, she is home schooled and lives in a reddish stone, three stories tall house which has well-known leisure class parties. She has a cousin named Emmie, whose rent party is the first ever that Dave attends.

- Mrs. Parker

Irma Lee's "Mama"; Irma Lee's real mama's cousin, she adopted Irma Lee when her parents died. Her house parties are so exclusive that even the prince of Sweden couldn't get in.

- Mike

One of Dave's buddies from HHB who has the twitches that constantly makes him jumpy. He spends most of his time drawing violins.

- Harvey

Another buddy from HHB with the hoarse voice and the know-it-all attitude, Dave is not fond of him at first but when he finds out that Harvey has his back he feels better about him.

- Eli

Tall, skinny boy he's been at HHB since he was seven years old when both of his parents died.

- Alfie

Another eleven-year-old buddy of Dave's, he has a bad case of consumption that causes him to leave HHB and move upstate where he would be able to get fresh air and a wholesome diet to get better.

- Moe

Dave's older bully, he always eats Dave's food before eating his own during meals, his only weakness is that he's very superstitious.

- Superintendent Bloom

Nicknamed Mr. Doom, Bloom is the superintendent at HHB, his version of disciplining the boys is to beat them viciously with a yard stick until they are able to get away or he breaks one of their limbs.

- Mr. Meltzer

The man that works there in charge of the elevens at the orphanage, who is not as mean as Mr. Doom.

- Mr. Gluck

Nicknamed Mr. Cluck, Gluck is Dave's teacher who lectures more on how the boys are worthless, good-for-nothings, and how stupid they are, than on actual learning topics.

- Mr. Hillinger

The art teacher at HHB and the only teacher that Dave actually likes, he teaches Dave several drawing techniques and encourages him with art, he introduces Dave to a passion and gift that he never knew he had before.

- Gideon

Dave's fourteen-year-old brother who was always in the library or studying, the opposite of Dave.

- Papa (Abraham)

A woodworker who made cabinets for the sultan of Turkey before he moved to New York City, he died on Tuesday, October 26, 1926 when he fell off of a roof.

- Mrs. Smith

One of Solly's regular customers, she's very gullible and tends to believe anything Solly tells her.

- Bert

A waiter and a frequent customer of Solly.

- Ed

The janitor at HHB that lives in the basement.

- Pat

The mean old guy.

- Mrs. Stern

The neighbor from across the hall at the house where Dave lived when his Papa was alive.

- Dave's family

Dave's family includes his stepmother, Ida, who made lady blouses at the house before Papa's death and worked at a sewing factory afterwards, and Aunt Sarah and Aunt Lily. Aunt Sarah is Papa's sister while Aunt Lily is Mama's sister, who lives with Sarah. Dave's Uncle Jack lives in Chicago and is Gideon's favorite relative. Jack also adopted Gideon after Papa's death, but he constantly has headaches and works as a bookkeeper at a printing press. Dave's mother, Mama, died when giving birth to him.

== Yiddish definitions ==
Boychik- a little boy

Landsman- a fellow Jew

Mazel Tov- congratulations

Gonif- somebody who fools people out of their money

Shayneh shvartzeh maidel- pretty black girl

Meshuggeneh- a crazy person

Alrightnik- someone who forgets that he wasn't born a doctor, a judge, or a businessman; he forgets that a lot of people made it possible for him to get so high-and-mighty

== Comparison to reality ==
Dave Caros was inspired by Levine's father David Carasso who later changed his name to Carson to be a "real American".

The Hebrew Orphan Asylum was the name of the actual orphanage that Levine's father grew up in, not the Hebrew Home for Boys. The Hebrew Orphan Asylum took in boys and girls and the process to enter was more formal than depicted in the book.

The rent parties were fictional; however there were parties and salons during the Harlem Renaissance on the 1920s and '30.

== Awards ==
ALA Best Book for Young Adults

New York Public Library Best Children's Books of the 20th century

Dorothy Canfield Fisher Children's Book Award 2000-2001 Masterlist (1 of 30)

"Outstanding Achievement" Honor Book for 1999 by Parent's Guide to Children's Media

One of Amazon.com's 1999 Top Ten Best Books for ages 9–12

School Library Journal Best Book

Book Sense Pick

== Other editions ==
Denmark

Germany

Italy

France
