= Henry Alexander (painter) =

American painter

- Born: 1860; San Francisco, California
- Died: May 15, 1894 (aged 33–34); New York, New York
- Education: Academy of Fine Arts Munich
- Known for: painting

Henry Alexander (1860 – May 15, 1894) was an American painter from San Francisco. He left San Francisco for New York City in 1887, but he suffered from recurring money troubles and alcoholism. On May 15, 1894, his money troubles led him to commit suicide by swallowing oxalic acid in the Oriental Hotel Following his death, many of his works were destroyed in the San Francisco earthquake of 1906.

== Career ==
He was born in San Francisco. After early exhibiting a talent for drawing and painting, he went to study at the Academy of Fine Arts in Munich, where his teachers were Ludwig von Loeffts and the history painter Wilhelm Lindenschmidt.

Aside from a few trompe-l'œil paintings, his paintings generally depict individuals within highly detailed interiors. He is especially known for his paintings of men in cluttered offices filled with business furnishings or laboratory equipment, such as his several paintings of the mineralogist Thomas Price. He also painted Chinese and Japanese subjects.

He left San Francisco for New York City on April 15, 1887, in order to be at the center of the art world, but he suffered from money troubles and alcoholism. He had a studio at 51 West Tenth Street. The other artists in the building avoided him, because he was always trying to borrow money.

== Suicide and lost works ==
Alexander's work attracted enough notice that the New York Herald described him as one of the creators of the modern school of art. On May 15, 1894, his money troubles led him to commit suicide by swallowing oxalic acid in the Oriental Hotel at Broadway and Thirty-Ninth Street.

Many of his works were destroyed in the San Francisco earthquake of 1906.

== List of paintings ==
- Morning Prayer
- Sunday Afternoon
- Scene from 'The Mikado' with Louise Paullin
- Lost Genius
- First Lesson
- Neglecting Business (Playing Chess), 1887 (now in the Fine Arts Museum of San Francisco)
- The Letter Home
- Lesson in Gunning
- The Cap Makers (as of 1892, in the collection of Thomas D. Clark)
- Sunday Morning (as of 1892, in the collection of Thomas D. Clark)
- Interesting Game (as of 1892, in the collection of Thomas D. Clark)
- The Hebrew Orphan Asylum (the painter's favorite)
- In the Laboratory (painted 1885–87; a portrait of the San Francisco assayer Thomas Price; in the collection of the Metropolitan Museum of Art, purchased 1939, item number 39.46)
