= Ludwig B. Bernstein =

Latvian-American Jewish-American sociologist and social worker

Ludwig Behr Bernstein
- Born: May 4, 1870; Mitau, Courland, Russia
- Died: December 27, 1944 (aged 74); Los Angeles, California, USA
- Education: New York University School of Pedagogy; Columbia University
- Spouses: Sophia Kivman (m. 1899, d. unknown) Ethel Deborah Lipman (m. 1936)
- Children: 4

Ludwig Behr Bernstein (May 4, 1870 – December 27, 1944) was a Latvian-American Jewish-American sociologist and social worker.

== Early life and education ==
Bernstein was born on May 4, 1870, in Mitau, Courland Governorate, Russia, the son of Moses Bernstein and Rasya Loevinsohn. He immigrated to America in 1892.

Bernstein attended the Gymnasium Academicum in Mitau, graduating from there with a Testimonium maturitatis in 1890. He then went to the New York University School of Pedagogy and Columbia University. He graduated from the latter with an A.M. in 1894 and a Ph.D. in 1897. He initially worked as an instructor in public schools in New York City, New York. From 1898 to 1903, he worked as an instructor in Latin and German at DeWitt Clinton High School. In 1903, he passed the examination for the position of 1st assistant vice-principal in high schools, the only Jew to hold that position at the time.

== Career ==
In 1903, Bernstein became managing director of the Hebrew Sheltering Guardian Orphan Asylum in Pleasantville. He held that position for fifteen years, during which time he organized and developed one of the largest cottage home plans in the country for the care and education of dependent children as well as the Home Bureau of the Hebrew Sheltering Guardian Society, the first comprehensive Jewish foster home bureau. He then worked as executive director of the Bureau of Social Research in New York City, conducting surveys on child welfare and juvenile delinquency in the Jewish communities of Chicago and Philadelphia in 1919 and New York City in 1920. In 1921, he moved to Pittsburgh, Pennsylvania, and became director of the local Federation of Jewish Philanthropies. He began lecturing for the University of Pittsburgh Department of Philosophy in 1925, and in 1928 he became special lecturer on child care at the Graduate School of Jewish Social Work in New York City.

Bernstein was a member of a committee that studied and inspected child-caring institutions in New York City from 1915 to 1916. In the 1930s, he was a pioneer in the movement to establish Jewish community councils in American cities. He wrote numerous articles for the Proceedings of the New York State Conferences of Social Work and the Proceedings of the National Conferences of Social Works. He wrote several books, including The Order of Words in Old Norse Prose in 1897, How 500 Children Live and Learn in 1914, and Questions and Suggestions With Regard to Child Care in Institutions and Agencies in 1918. He also participated in the first White House conference on child welfare at the invitation of President Theodore Roosevelt. He retired as executive director of the Pittsburgh Federation of Jewish Philanthropies in 1937, after which he moved to Los Angeles, California.

Bernstein was chairman of the child welfare section of the New York State Conferences of Charities, chairman of the Social Service Exchange of Pittsburgh, president of the Allegheny Board of Visitors, director of the Pittsburgh Federation of Social Agencies, an executive committee member of the Pennsylvania State Conference of the National Child Labor Committee, president of the National Conference of Jewish Social Service in 1925, president of the New York Association Modern Language Teachers from 1900 to 1902, president of the Social Workers Club, honorary president of Askon, and a member of B'nai B'rith. He attended Congregation Rodef Shalom.

== Personal life ==
In 1899, he married Sophia Kivman. Their children were Evelyn Krohn, Marie Namser, Pauline Oseroff, and Stanley Burnshaw. In 1936, he married Ethel Deborah Lipman in New York City in a ceremony performed by Solomon Lowenstein. Bernstein died at St. Vincent's Hospital in Los Angeles from a two-day illness that followed a heart attack on December 27, 1944. He was buried in Westview Cemetery in Pittsburgh.
