= Ella Enchanted (film) =

2004 film by Tommy O'Haver

- Canadian theatrical release poster
- Directed by: Tommy O'Haver
- Screenplay by: Laurie Craig; Karen McCullah Lutz; Kirsten Smith; Jennifer Heath; Michelle J. Wolff
- Based on: Ella Enchanted (1997 novel) by Gail Carson Levine
- Produced by: Susan Miller; Jane Startz
- Starring: Anne Hathaway; Hugh Dancy; Cary Elwes; Vivica A. Fox; Joanna Lumley; Minnie Driver; Eric Idle
- Cinematography: John de Borman
- Edited by: Masahiro Hirakubo
- Music by: Nick Glennie-Smith
- Production companies: Blessington Film Productions; Jane Startz Productions
- Distributed by: Miramax Films (US); Miramax International (through Buena Vista International; international)
- Release dates: April 9, 2004 (US); December 17, 2004 (UK/Ireland)
- Running time: 92 minutes
- Countries: United States; United Kingdom; Ireland
- Language: English
- Budget: $31 million
- Box office: $27.4 million

Ella Enchanted is a 2004 musical fantasy comedy film directed by Tommy O'Haver from a screenplay co-written by Karen McCullah Lutz and Kirsten Smith, loosely based on Gail Carson Levine's 1997 novel. Starring Anne Hathaway and Hugh Dancy, the film is a satire of the fairy tale genre. The cast also features Cary Elwes, Vivica A. Fox, Joanna Lumley, Minnie Driver and Eric Idle.

As an infant, Ella (Hathaway) receives a misguided present from her fairy godmother, a spell to be constantly obedient, a fact she must hide from everyone, especially from her new stepfamily in order to protect the prince and soon to be king, a friend she is falling for.

An international co-production between companies in the United States, the United Kingdom, and Ireland, the film was a box-office bomb and received mixed critical reviews. It was heavily criticized for its changes to the source material and addition of new characters, and Levine stated that the film is "so different from the book that it's hard to compare them" and suggested "regarding the movie as a separate creative act". It has become a popular cult classic, with stars including Dancy making appearances at fan conventions.

== Plot ==
In the kingdom of Frell, the misguided and obnoxious fairy godmother Lucinda Perriweather bestows the "gift" of obedience on newborn Ella of Frell, causing her to obey any command literally and immediately. On her deathbed, Ella's mother warns her not to tell anyone about the gift, fearing that someone may exploit it. Ella is also told there is something in her stronger than any spell.

Years later, Ella's father Sir Peter marries a wealthy socialite, Dame Olga, who mistreats Ella. Ella publicly protests and meets Prince "Char" Charmont, who invites her to his coronation ball. Jealous, Olga's daughter Hattie finds out about Ella's obedience and uses it to humiliate and control her. Ella resolves to find Lucinda to undo the "gift". Mandy, the household fairy, lends Ella her boyfriend, Benny, whom she has accidentally transformed into a magic book. Ella learns that Lucinda is in Giantville and goes to find her.

On her journey, Ella rescues Slannen, an elf who aspires to become a lawyer rather than an entertainer. They are captured by ogres but are rescued by Char. He joins them, intending to avenge the death of his father. Ella opens his eyes to the cruelty of the laws that Char's uncle, Sir Edgar, the King Regent, has enacted to oppress elves and giants.

Ella and Char begin to fall in love as they travel to the capital for Char's coronation. Learning of Ella's "gift" from her stepsisters, Edgar orders Ella to murder Char at midnight and keep the plan a secret. Edgar inadvertently reveals he murdered Char's father, and that Char's death will make him king. Ella writes Char a letter, saying she must leave but cannot explain why. She has Slannen chain her to a far-off tree, hoping to wait out Edgar's command, while Slannen recruits more elves and giants to protect Char.

Lucinda appears, and Ella begs her to reverse the spell. Offended, Lucinda insists Ella must do so herself and unchains her. Forced to return to the castle to carry out Edgar's order, Ella stumbles into the ball.

Char takes Ella to the hall of mirrors where he proposes. As she is about to stab him, she sees her reflection along with a vision of her late mother, and commands herself to no longer be obedient, freeing her from the curse. Char notices the dagger, and Edgar, who was watching in hopes of witnessing the murder, has Ella arrested before she can explain herself.

Benny reveals Ella is in the dungeon, so Slannen sneaks into the castle along with a band of elves, giants, and ogres, and frees her. He also warns them that Edgar has poisoned Char's crown, intending to kill him at the coronation. Ella and the others interrupt the ceremony and a brawl ensues.

In the scuffle, Mandy manages to turn Benny human again. As Char and Ella fight off the guards, she confesses her love for him and reveals Edgar's plot. Edgar's talking snake, Heston, almost fatally bites Char, which the latter takes as evidence of his uncle's guilt. Edgar proclaims himself king, puts on the poisoned crown, and collapses.

Soon after, Char and Ella are married, and Char toasts to a new era of equality among all citizens of the kingdom. Edgar is revealed to still be alive, but disabled and using a wheelchair. The cast performs a final dance number of "Don't Go Breaking My Heart" before the newlyweds ride off on their honeymoon.

== Cast ==
- Anne Hathaway as Ella of Frell, a girl given the "gift" (or curse) of obedience by the fairy Lucinda, which magically compels her to literally obey every command she is given, even if it is against her wishes. She has a powerful singing voice, big enough to blow out a fire.
  - Aimee Brigg as young Ella
- Hugh Dancy as Prince "Char" Charmont, son of the late king and heir to the throne. He has his own overzealous fan club and is treated like a teen heartthrob, though he disagrees with this label.
- Cary Elwes as Sir Edgar, the Prince's evil uncle and king regent who wants the crown for himself. He killed King Florian and took over the crown years ago.
- Vivica A. Fox as Lucinda Perriweather, an angry, misguided, and often unhelpful fairy who gave the "gift" of obedience to Ella as a newborn infant.
- Joanna Lumley as Dame Olga, Ella's cruel stepmother.
- Jimi Mistry as Benny, Mandy's boyfriend whom she had accidentally transformed into a giant magic book (before the film's events) and a pumpkin for a short time. He is later turned back into his human form towards the end of the film.
- Steve Coogan as the voice of Heston, Edgar's pet snake and royal advisor.
- Aidan McArdle as Slannen, an elf who wants to become a lawyer.
- Heidi Klum as Brumhilda, a giantess and Slannen's love interest.
- Minnie Driver as Mandy, a household fairy who lives in Ella's home.
- Patrick Bergin as Sir Peter, Ella's father and Eleanor's husband.
- Eric Idle as the Narrator, our storyteller who speaks only in rhymes and is often seen breaking the fourth wall.
- Jim Carter as Nish, an ogre who eats humans and the leader of the pack of ogres.
- Jennifer Higham as Olive, Ella's kleptomaniac and dim-witted stepsister who always follows her older sister Hattie.
- Parminder Nagra as Areida, Ella's childhood best friend.
  - Ankita Malkan as young Areida
- Lucy Punch as Hattie, one of Ella's cruel stepsisters who is obsessed with Prince Charmont.
- Donna Dent as Lady Eleanor, Ella's birth mother and Peter's first wife.
- Alvaro Lucchesi as Koopooduk, a giant
- Johnny Trí Nguyễn, Lin Oeding, Sophia Crawford, Roger Yuan, and Ron Yuan as Red Knights

== Themes ==
The film can be seen as a feminist re-working of the classic Cinderella, offering a message of self-determination and individual empowerment to counter the typical passive acceptance of fate.

== Production ==
Hathaway, who first read the book when she was 16, says that there was originally a version of the script that was much closer to the book but that it did not work as a film; she added that she prefers the way the movie actually turned out because it "makes fun of itself for being a fairy tale." Levine states that the film is "so different from the book that it's hard to compare them," noting the addition of new characters such as Sir Edgar and Heston, and suggested "regarding the movie as a separate creative act".

Hathaway did her own singing in the film.

Jimi Mistry, a British actor of Indian descent, said that he enjoyed playing a talking book in the film because it offered him the opportunity to do something different from his other roles. "You can't get less Indian than a talking book, and an American talking book, so it was great," he said.

Tommy O'Haver signed up to direct in early 2001.

Filming took place in Ireland at Ardmore Studios and on location in Wicklow during August–December 2002. Locations included Luggala Estate, Killruddery House and Garden, and Kiltegan.

== Release ==
Miramax Films released the film on April 9, 2004.

=== Box office ===
Ella Enchanted opened on April 9, 2004, and earned $6,169,030 in its opening weekend, ranking number nine at the domestic box office. At the end of its run, the film grossed $22,918,387 domestically and $4,470,380 overseas for a worldwide total of $27,388,767.

=== Critical response ===
The film received mixed reviews from critics. The Irish Film and Television Network reported that, although the film faced criticism for its perceived lack of originality in incorporating contemporary elements into a medieval setting, aspects such as the cast, settings, art direction, and cinematography received praise. Review aggregator Rotten Tomatoes gives it a 51% approval rating based on 115 reviews with an average rating of 5.6/10. The site's consensus reads: "Hathaway is a charming heroine, but the simple storyline gets overwhelmed by silly gimmickry." On Metacritic, the film has a 53 out of 100 rating based on 30 critics, indicating "mixed or average" reviews. Audiences polled by CinemaScore gave the film an average rating of "A-" on an A+ to F scale.

Chicago Sun-Times critic Roger Ebert gave the film 3.5 stars out of 4, praising it as "the best family film so far this year" (April 9, 2004), and in July 2004, "a movie that came out in April and sank without a trace, despite the fact that it was magical, funny, intelligent, romantic and charming".

== Home media ==
Buena Vista Home Entertainment (under the Miramax Home Entertainment banner) released the film on DVD in the United States (Region 1) on August 24, 2004. This release was presented in widescreen. Miramax Home Entertainment released the film on DVD in the United Kingdom (Region 2) on April 18, 2005, while in Australia (Region 4) it was released at an undetermined date in approximately mid-2005. The film also received a Hong Kong VCD release on August 9, 2005, which was handled by local distributor Panorama.

Lionsgate Home Entertainment reissued the film on DVD on April 26, 2011, before releasing it on Blu-ray on October 16, 2012. The 2012 Lionsgate release was a Blu-ray/DVD combo pack.

On September 22, 2020, Paramount Home Entertainment reissued Ella Enchanted on Blu-ray, with this being one of many Miramax titles that they reissued around this time. The 2020 Paramount Blu-ray included a digital download code for the film, but was not a Blu-ray/DVD combo pack like the 2012 Lionsgate release.

The film was made available on Paramount's subscription streaming service Paramount+, which launched in 2021, in addition to being made available on their free streaming service Pluto TV.

== Soundtrack ==
The film's soundtrack was released on April 6, 2004, by Hollywood Records, Epic Records and Sony Music Soundtrax and features Kelly Clarkson's cover of Aretha Franklin's "Respect" along with Hathaway's cover of "Somebody to Love" by Queen and "Don't Go Breaking My Heart" by Elton John and Kiki Dee, covered by Hathaway and Jesse McCartney.

== TV series ==
In 2026, it was announced that Paramount Television Studios and Miramax are developing a TV series adaptation for Disney+. Anne Hathaway will serve as executive producer with Beth Schwartz as showrunner and Ilana Wolpert writing.
