= Catherine Besterman =

Polish-American children's author

- Born: Katarzyna Lejtin; 8 August 1904; Warsaw, Poland
- Died: February 1985 (aged 80)
- Occupation: Author
- Writing career
- Genre: Children's literature

Catherine Besterman (née Katarzyna Lejtin; 8 August 1904 – February 1985) was a Polish-American children's author. Her book The Quaint and Curious Quest of Johnny Longfoot was a Newbery Honor recipient in 1948.

== Early life ==
Besterman was born in Warsaw, Poland.

== Career ==
In Warsaw, she worked as a journalist. She married fellow journalist Władysław Besterman (1903–1974) in 1934. In 1941, during World War II, Besterman fled Poland to the United States through Lisbon and Rio de Janeiro, with her husband and their 4-year-old son, Karol. They resided in Washington, D.C. where her husband worked as a press attaché for the Polish Embassy during the war.

Before her departure from Poland, Besterman had considered adapting a Polish folktale for young readers. After arriving in the US, Besterman elected to do so; her first book, The Quaint and Curious Quest of Johnny Longfoot, was published in 1947. It was named to the Best Books of 1947 list by The Horn Book Magazine, and then was selected as a Newbery Honor title in 1948.

Besterman published one further novel, a sequel titled The Extraordinary Education of Johnny Longfoot in His Search for the Magic Hat (1949). Both books were illustrated by Warren Chappell.

== Personal life ==
Her husband was a foreign correspondent for the United Press International in Warsaw from 1928 to 1939. In the United States, where he anglicized his name to Walter Maurice, he worked as an immigration aide and then a diplomat. The couple later returned to Europe, where Walter worked for the Intergovernmental Committee for European Migration and was a senior vice president with the Tolstoy Foundation. He died in Geneva in 1974.

She died in Europe in February 1985.
