= Gail Carson Levine =

American writer (born 1947)

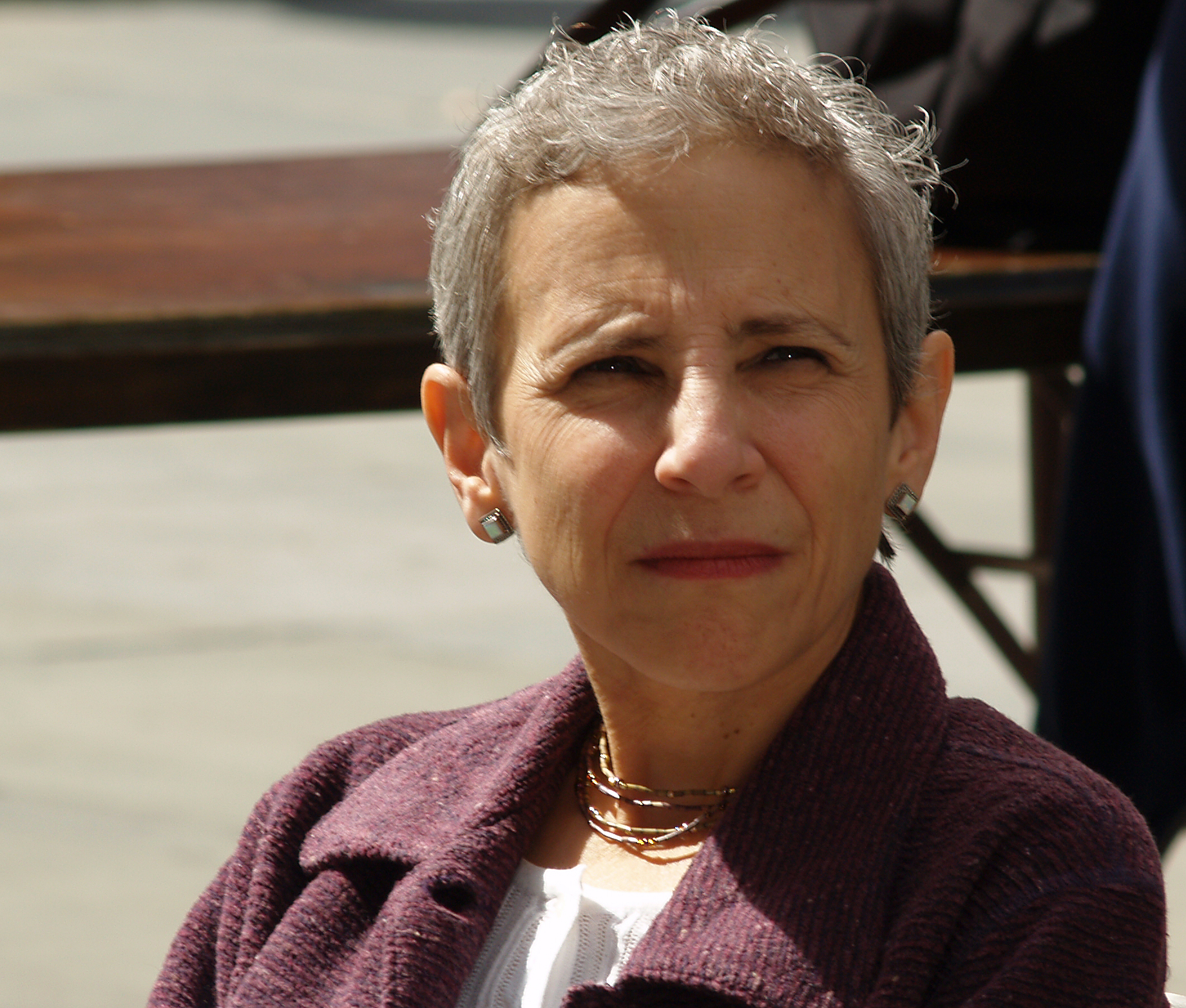
- Born: September 17, 1947 (age 78); New York, New York
- Education: City College of New York
- Spouse: David Levine (m. 1967)
- Writing career
- Genre: Young adult literature
- Notable works: The Two Princesses of Bamarre; Ella Enchanted; Fairest
- Notable awards: Newbery Honor
- Website: gailcarsonlevine.com

Gail Carson Levine (born September 17, 1947) is an American author of young adult books. Her first novel, Ella Enchanted, received a Newbery Honor in 1998.

== Early life ==
Levine grew up in New York City, New York in a Jewish family. She credits her parents David and Sylvia for her creative streak. Her father, whose childhood in the Hebrew Orphan Asylum of New York provided inspiration for her story Dave at Night, owned a commercial art studio, and her mother was a teacher who wrote plays for her students to perform. Her older sister, Rani, her senior by five years, became a painter.

As a child, Levine read avidly; her favorite book was James M. Barrie's Peter Pan, and she also enjoyed the works of Louisa May Alcott and L. M. Montgomery. She initially aspired to be an actress and painter, and participated in theater troupes before losing interest in acting.

In 1967, she married David Levine. She majored in philosophy at New York's City College, where she received her B.A. in 1969. She spent the next 27 years working for the government of the state of New York, mainly as a welfare administrator, helping people find jobs. She also has an Airedale Terrier named Reggie.

== Writing career ==
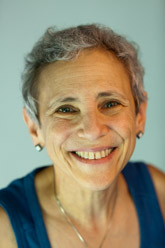
Photo of Gail Carson Levine

After taking a class in writing and illustrating for children, Levine discovered that she enjoyed writing far more than illustrating. Thus in 1987, she began writing, but over the next nine years, all of her manuscripts were rejected. During this time she took writing classes and joined writer's groups. Reflecting on her experiences, Levine says "those years were some of my happiest. I was learning to write."

Her first published novel was Ella Enchanted, which was accepted for publication by HarperTrophy. Levine recalls, "That day, April 17, 1996, was one of the happiest in my life." The book was published in 1997, and in 1998, it received a Newbery Honor. It would later be the inspiration for the 2004 film of the same name. The success of Ella Enchanted made it possible for Levine to retire from government work and pursue writing full-time.

Levine's next novel, Dave at Night, was inspired by her curiosity about her father's experiences living in an orphanage. Levine says, "I made up my own version of my father's childhood. It's entirely fiction, but I think the character of Dave is somewhat like my father. And I think that the friendship, the intense bonding, among the boys must be close to what happened." For her following novel, The Wish, a book about popularity in middle school, Levine, who skipped eighth grade, had to do some research: "I spent a day following an eighth grade class around, and I asked a lot of questions. I also interviewed several kids about their hobbies, their classes, their opinions on popularity and life."

Levine, following the success of her adaptation of the Cinderella story into Ella Enchanted, continued telling fairy tales with a twist in what would become her Princess Tales series. According to Levine, "After Ella Enchanted was published, I submitted some of my old, much rejected picture books to my editor. She liked one, which was then called Talk Is Cheap? But she thought it should be a short novel, rather than a picture book, and she asked me to do three more. That picture book turned into The Fairy's Mistake, and that's how the series got started." Her six short stories reinvent traditional fairy tales, looking to fill gaps in logic. As Levine says, "In Sleeping Beauty, the prince falls in love with the princess when he knows only three things about her: she's pretty, she's a princess, and she doesn't snore. In Princess Sonora and the Long Sleep… I give the prince a real reason to kiss Sonora even though, after 100 years, she's covered with spider webs!" Keeping with this genre, Levine also wrote a picture book, Betsy Who Cried Wolf, adapted from Aesop's fable of The Boy Who Cried Wolf. In 2010, she released a second picture book titled Betsy Red Hoodie, an adaptation of the fable "Little Red Riding Hood".

Levine continued to write fantasy novels, beginning with The Two Princesses of Bamarre, an original fairytale that revolves around the relationship between two very different sisters as one must conquer her fears in an attempt to save the other. Also in the fantasy genre came Fairest, a novel inspired by the story of Snow White and set in the same world as Ella Enchanted. Later she would publish Ever, a fantasy set in ancient times which explored mythological themes.

Levine also wrote an illustrated novel for young readers called Fairy Dust and the Quest For the Egg, which was published in 2005 by Disney Press as the cornerstone of the new "Disney Fairies" franchise. The novel explores the world of Never Land (of Barrie's and Disney's Peter Pan) and the community of fairies who live in the area of the island known as Fairy Haven. Familiar characters such as Tinker Bell and Captain Hook appear in the story, as well as original characters. The book was followed in 2007 by a sequel, entitled Fairy Haven and the Quest for the Wand. Another sequel, Fairies and the Quest for Never Land, was released in 2010.

Levine also runs writing workshops for children in her community. "I love the kids. I love doing it. It's great. It's the best thing I do I think." In her workshops, Levine created a number of exercises for the students, which led to the development of her non-fiction book Writing Magic: Creating Stories That Fly, a book for children about writing.

== Themes ==
Themes of Levine's books include magic and magical creatures, love and marriage, and strong female leads. Most of her novels end with some type of romantic relationship, often marriage. Common messages from her books include the importance of kindness, selflessness, self-confidence and courage in the face of danger.

== Bibliography ==
- Ella Enchanted (1997) – Loose retelling of "Cinderella"
- Dave at Night (1999)
- The Princess Tales: Volume One (2002) (compilation volume)
  - The Fairy's Mistake (1999) – Retelling of "Toads and Diamonds"
  - The Princess Test (1999) – Retelling of "The Princess and the Pea"
  - Princess Sonora and the Long Sleep (1999) – Retelling of "Sleeping Beauty"
- The Wish (2000)
- The Two Princesses of Bamarre (2001)
- Betsy Who Cried Wolf (2002)
- The Princess Tales: Volume Two (2004) (compilation volume)
  - Cinderellis and the Glass Hill (2000) – Retelling of "The Princess on the Glass Hill"
  - For Biddle's Sake (2002) – Retelling of "Puddocky"
  - The Fairy's Return (2002) – Retelling of "The Golden Goose"
- Fairy Dust and the Quest for the Egg (2005)
- Fairest (2006) – Retelling of "Snow White and the Seven Dwarfs" and set in the same world as Ella Enchanted
- Writing Magic: Creating Stories That Fly (2006)
- The Fairy's Return and Other Princess Tales (2006) (compilation volume of all six Princess Tales stories)
- Fairy Haven and the Quest for the Wand (2008)
- Ever (2008)
- Fairies and the Quest for Never Land (2010)
- Betsy Red Hoodie (2010)
- A Tale of Two Castles (2011)
- Forgive Me, I Meant to Do It (2012)
- Stolen Magic (2015)
- Writer to Writer (2015)
- The Lost Kingdom of Bamarre (2017) – set centuries before The Two Princesses of Bamarre and inspired by "Rapunzel"
- Ogre Enchanted (2018) – set before the events of Ella Enchanted
- A Ceiling Made of Eggshells (2020)
- Sparrows in the Wind (2022)
