= Solomon Lowenstein =

American rabbi and social worker

Solomon Lowenstein (March 3, 1877 – January 20, 1942) was an American rabbi, social worker, and philanthropist.

== Life ==
Lowenstein was born on March 3, 1877, in Philadelphia, Pennsylvania, the son of Levi Lowenstein and Diana Newmayer.

Lowenstein moved to Ohio with his parents when he was a child, attending public school in Cleveland. He graduated from the University of Cincinnati with a B.A. in 1898. He then went to Hebrew Union College, where he was ordained a Reform rabbi in 1901. He began working in social work in 1900 when he became head of Cincinnati's Jewish Settlement. From 1901 to 1904, he was in charge of the city's United Jewish Charities. He moved to New York City following his marriage in 1904, at which point he became head of New York's United Hebrew Charities. He resigned from there in 1905 to become superintendent of the Hebrew Orphan Asylum of New York, working there for the next fifteen years. From 1918 to 1919, he was also deputy commissioner of the American Red Cross Commission to Palestine.

In 1920, Lowenstein became director of the Federation of Jewish Philanthropic Societies. He served in that position until 1935, when he became the Federation's vice-president. He served as vice-president until his death. During his time with the Federation, he coordinated and systematized its operations to handle the ongoing Great Depression. He was president of the 1938 National Conference of Social Work.

Lowenstein was a member of the Temporary Emergency Relief Committee of New York State in 1934. In 1936, he was on the New York State Board of Social Welfare. He was chairman of the executive group of the New York City coordinating committee of employment as well as chairman of the Welfare Council committee on social service exchange. He was also president of the 1922 National Conference of Jewish Social Service, the 1923 New York State Conference of Social Work, and the 1932 and 1933 New York City Conferences of Social Work.

In 1934, as chairman of the German Jewish Children's Aid, Inc., he announced arrangements were made to bring 250 German Jewish children to the United States. He spent the next several years frequently asking the American government to give sanctuary to a proposed quota of 20,000 European children. He was a trustee of the American Jewish Committee, vice president of the American Friends of the Hebrew University, a director of Survey Associates, the Joint Distribution Committee, and the National Refugee Service, and a member of the Admission and Distribution Committee of the Greater New York Fund and the Hospital Council of Greater New York.

Lowenstein was a member of Phi Beta Kappa, the Harmonie Club, and the City Club of New York. In 1904, he married Linda Berger of La Crosse, Wisconsin. Their children were Leonore, Nathan, Judith, and Rebecca.

Lowenstein died from a heart attack while on his way to meeting with the JDC on January 20, 1942. His funeral service was conducted by Rabbi Jonah Wise. Over 1,500 people attended the funeral, including Bailey Barton Burritt, Joseph M. Proskauer, Stanley M. Isaacs, Homer Folks, George Z. Medalie, Samuel D. Leidesdorf, Victor F. Ridder, Mitchell May, Edward Lazansky, Max Warburg, Adele Lewisohn Lehman, Iphigene Ochs Sulzberger, Samuel Rosenman, Mary Kingsbury Simkhovitch, Charles Culp Burlingham, John M. Schiff, Rabbi Louis Israel Newman, Rabbi Louis Finkelstein, and Rabbi David de Sola Pool.
