= Fairest (novel) =

2006 novel by Gail Carson Levine

- Author: Gail Carson Levine
- Genre: Fantasy
- Publisher: HarperCollins
- Publication date: 2006
- Pages: 326
- ISBN: 0-06-073408-6
- OCLC: 63178754
- LC Class: PZ8.L4793 Fa 2006
- Preceded by: Ella Enchanted

Fairest is a 2006 novel by Gail Carson Levine. It uses some plot elements of the classic "Snow White" and is set in the same world as Ella Enchanted. The kingdom of Ayortha, the setting of the story, is the neighboring kingdom of Kyrria, where Ella Enchanted was set and the story makes several allusions to the previous work.

== Synopsis ==
Aza, the adopted daughter of innkeepers in Ayortha, has always hated her appearance. Her prodigious size and her odd coloring—milk-white skin, dragon tongue lips, and hair that seems to be frying-pan black—are greatly at variance with the land's standards of beauty and often make her the target of stares and rude comments. However, Aza's voice garners as much attention as her looks, for Ayortha is a land of song, and Aza is an amazing singer. Besides being skilled at singing, Aza can also flawlessly mimic people and throw her voice without moving her mouth, a form of ventriloquism she calls "illusing". Still, Aza is flattered when a frequent visitor to the inn, a gnome named Zhamm, tells Aza that her hair is the most beautiful he has ever seen. While her hair looks black to humans, it is the lovely color htun, a dark purplish color, to gnomes. Zhamm foresees that they will meet again at some point in the future.

When Aza's sister, Areida, goes to finishing school, the Duchess of Olixo, an irritable guest at the Featherbed Inn, requests that Aza accompany her to the royal wedding because her companion has fallen ill. The new queen, the beautiful Ivi, discovers Aza's unusual musical gift and manipulates her. As Ivi cannot sing well, she offers to reward Aza with land, wealth, and riches for her family, as well as elevation to the rank of lady-in-waiting in exchange for Aza illusing a marvelous singing voice for her when she needs to sing; when Aza tries to refuse, Ivi threatens to imprison her and close her family's inn.

Soon after Aza reluctantly accepts Ivi's offer, the castle is thrown into turmoil when King Oscaro is terribly wounded during a sporting event with centaurs because the king threw himself in front of Ivi to save her. Aza is caught in the midst of Ivi's power-hungry plotting, the affection of the king's nephew, Crown Prince Ijori, the suspicions of the choirmaster Sir Uellu (a senior official in this land of song), and her own increasing desperation to become beautiful, a desire which grows so strong that she tries a beauty spell, but instead the spell turns her to stone. Although she recovers, she's left with a marble pinky toe. When the country seems to be on the verge of revolt, Aza and Ivi's deception is publicly discovered by accident. The incident with the marble toe does not deter her desire to be beautiful, which leads Aza to drink a beauty potion created by Skulni, the mysterious, evil creature living in a magic mirror given to Ivi as a wedding gift from the fairy Lucinda. Aza becomes beautiful, but still remains self-conscious about herself. Aza is branded as the dangerous relative of an ogre because of her figure and strong powerful voice and imprisoned, but she escapes with Ivi's guard Uju, who later tells her that he was ordered by Ivi to kill her, but could not now that she is beautiful. Uju takes Aza to the Gnome Caverns to keep her safe, fulfilling Zhamm's prophecy.

In exile, Aza is welcomed by the gnomes; Zhamm provides her with food, shelter, and a sense of heritage. He is surprised by her appearance and then tells her about how she now almost has no htun left in her hair. He assures her that while she is certainly not part ogre, he believes one of her ancestors was a gnome, explaining her strange appearance and htun hair, and also the point that she can see htun if he holds her hand. She learns that the gnomes can illuse as well, though they can't mimic different voices. After Aza has spent some time with the gnomes, Ivi appears, disguised as a gnome, and tricks Aza into eating a poisoned apple. Her spirit is taken back to the enchanted mirror, where she discovers that Ivi's actions have been manipulated by Skulni so that he can take a vacation when Ivi is killed since then Ivi's spirit would take Skulni's place, and her spirit would be trapped in the mirror until Skulni returns. Aza manages to destroy the mirror and warn Ivi about Skulni's evil plans through the mirror; the mirror's destruction also removes Aza and Ivi's magically obtained beauty. Aza awakens back in Gnome Caverns with a newfound respect for herself. To her surprise, Ijori is also there, and he apologizes for not defending and believing her.

Aza marries Ijori, King Oscaro finally recovers, and Ivi turns from her evil ways. The King decides to abdicate in favor of his nephew, since he still loves Ivi but does not trust her with having access to power, and retires with Ivi to the southern castle. Aza becomes queen of Ayortha, alongside her husband, now King Ijori. She bears three children, all of whom greatly resemble their father but have htun hair and can illuse just like their mother. Though she does not learn who her biological parents were, Zhamm manages to find out that they are distant relatives through a mutual great-great-great grandmother. Aza lives happily ever after along with the family that raised her and truly loved her.

== Characters ==
- Aza – A sixteen-year-old girl from Ayortha, who was adopted by an innkeeper when she was left in the Lark chamber of his inn as a one month-old infant. She is the main protagonist of the story. Aza's adoptive sister, Areida, appears in Ella Enchanted as Ella's best friend. Ella's father, Sir Peter, is mentioned as a guest at the Featherbed Inn where Aza lives. When Aza was found, she was covered in a velvet blanket with gold trim, leading her family to suspect she is of noble or royal origin. She is insecure about her appearance and is convinced she is hideous and ugly, but has a beautiful speaking and singing voice to compensate. She was suspected to be part ogre, but is actually part gnome. She can illuse, or throw and send her voice from anywhere without moving her lips, and is also an extremely talented mimic of both speaking and singing voices. She ultimately falls madly in love with and marries Prince Ijori, becomes Queen of Ayortha and has three children, all three of whom inherit her gnome ancestry.
- Queen Ivi – (Pronounced like "Ivy") A 19-year-old commoner from the Kyrrian town of Bast who becomes Queen of Ayortha after marrying King Oscaro. She blackmails Aza into becoming her singing voice in order to preserve her own reputation. She is self-absorbed, as well as simple-minded, insecure, and concerned with beauty. When her new husband is injured, she uses Aza's voice in order to gain dictatorial control of Ayortha. Although typically selfish and uncaring, Ivi occasionally demonstrates concern for others, staying with her injured husband every night, and helping Aza find fashions which better suit her. She is sent to the southern castle at the end of the book for being too cold-hearted and power-hungry.
- Prince Ijori – The Crown Prince of Ayortha, the king's nephew and heir to the throne. Ijori is two years older than Aza. He first meets Aza in the receiving line at the royal wedding, and is later partnered with her in a song composing game, which they win. Throughout the course of the story, he becomes good friends with Aza, and eventually romantically kisses her, but he doubts her when she is accused of being part-ogre and plotting against the kingdom. He soon regains his faith in her while she lies dying in Gnome Caverns after eating the poisoned apple from Ivi that stuck in her throat. He revives her by hitting her on the back and dislodging the apple in her throat. Ijori ultimately proposes to Aza and Aza happily accepts, thus becoming King and Queen of Ayortha.
- zhamM – A gnome who frequents the Featherbed Inn. He becomes friends with Aza and welcomes her into his home at Gnome Caverns when she is in hiding. He is a judge and can read into the future to a certain extent, predicting the danger that Aza will find herself in. He teaches Aza about Gnome culture and helps her uncover her heritage. He learns at the end that he is Aza's distant cousin.
- Skulni – The main antagonist of the book. He lives in a mirror given to Ivi by Lucinda, the same fairy who granted Ella of Frell's "gift" of obedience. Those who use the potions of the mirror can become beautiful or take on disguises, but the price they pay is that, at their death, they become trapped in the mirror until Lucinda gives the mirror again, while Skulni takes a holiday. When not in the mirror, Skulni travels under the name "Master Ikulni." He even stayed at Aza's family's inn prior to the story's timeline; he apparently paid well, but when he left the money he paid vanished into thin air. In an effort to obtain his vacation sooner, Skulni expedites the deaths of the mirror's owners by preying on their weaknesses, giving them ill advice, and manipulating them; he has negatively influenced much of Ayorthaian history throughout the years. He is ultimately defeated by Aza; after she smashes the mirror, he is never heard of again.
- King Oscaro - He is the deeply respected and worshiped king of Ayortha and Ijori's maternal uncle. During a centaur show, the king was badly injured and left partially paralyzed and bed-ridden. He gradually recovers from Ivi's visits and eventually becomes sufficiently healed enough to make the conscious decision to leave the kingdom to his nephew while he retires to live with the exiled Ivi.
- Areida - Aza's adoptive younger sister. Becomes very good friends of Ella of Frell, alluding to Ella Enchanted.
- Fairy Lucinda - Gift giving fairy. Gave Queen Ivi gifts. (Also In Ella Enchanted)

== Sources ==
- Levine, Gail Carson. Fairest. New York : HarperCollins, 2006.
- Fairest at HarperCollins
- The Plain Truth New York Times Review by Naomi Wolf
  - A Little Too Harsh Perhaps Author Gail Gauthier's Response to Naomi Wolf's Review
- "Fairest" Review by KidsReads.com
