= Ella Enchanted =

1997 novel by Gail Carson Levine

- Book cover
- Author: Gail Carson Levine
- Language: English
- Genre: Fantasy
- Publisher: HarperCollins
- Publication date: January 1, 1997
- Publication place: United States
- Media type: Print (Hardcover, Paperback) and Audiobook
- Pages: 240
- ISBN: 0-06-440705-5
- OCLC: 39641341
- Followed by: Fairest

Ella Enchanted is a critically-acclaimed fantasy novel written by Gail Carson Levine. It was published in 1997 by HarperCollins Publishers. The book tells the story of Ella of Frell, a teenage girl who struggles to gain control of her own life as she navigates friendship, danger, and love while trying to break the curse of obedience that was placed on her at birth. The story is a retelling of "Cinderella" that features various mythical creatures, highlights modern themes relating to gender and autonomy, and draws a traditional fairytale into the modern era.

The book won a Newbery Honor in 1998. It was also the basis for a popular 2004 film adaptation and an award-winning stage musical.

In 2006, Levine went on to write Fairest, a retelling of the story of "Snow White" that is set in the same world as Ella Enchanted. Levine later published Ogre Enchanted, a prequel to Ella Enchanted, in 2018.

== Plot summary ==
At birth, Ella of Frell receives the "gift" of obedience from the fairy Lucinda, which turns out to be a terrible curse, forcing Ella to instantly and literally obey even the simplest commands from others. Throughout her childhood, Ella is guided and protected by her mother, Eleanor, and her family cook, Mandy. Eleanor passes away when Ella is fifteen, and at her funeral, Ella meets and befriends Prince Char.

Ella's father, Sir Peter, sends Ella to finishing school alongside Hattie and Olive, two daughters of the wealthy Dame Olga. At school, Hattie discovers and takes advantage of Ella's obedience, using it to end Ella's friendship with her best friend, Aredia. Devastated, Ella resolves to find Lucinda and reverse the spell.

Using her mother's magic book, Ella tracks Lucinda to a giant's wedding. On her journey, Ella is trapped by ogres, who command her not to run away, intending to eat her. She stays up all night practicing their language to talk them to sleep and successfully escapes. She then encounters Char and a group of soldiers, who apprehend the ogres. One of Char's men is sent to escort Ella to the wedding.

Upon finding Lucinda, Ella learns that she turns ungrateful recipients of her gifts into squirrels. Using an alias, Ella confronts Lucinda, who dismisses her and orders Ella to be happy with her gift.

Upon returning home, Ella is informed by Peter that he is financially ruined and must marry Dame Olga. At their wedding, Lucinda gifts them eternal love. Olga is livid after discovering Peter's financial situation, but, unable to stay angry at him due to Lucinda's gift, projects her anger onto Ella. When Peter leaves on a business trip, Hattie informs Olga of Ella's curse, and Olga makes Ella a servant.

Ella and Char secretly write to each other while he travels abroad. They begin to fall in love, but Ella, realizing her curse could endanger him and the kingdom of Kyrria once he assumes the throne, leads him to believe she has run off with a rich earl, leaving him heartbroken.

Mandy confronts Lucinda about the disastrous consequences of her gifts and convinces Lucinda to experience Ella's curse for herself. Six months later, Lucinda returns, disheveled and remorseful about the suffering she has caused. Ella learns that Char is set to return to Kyrria and begs Lucinda to remove the curse, but Lucinda insists that Ella must do so herself.

With Mandy and Lucinda's help, Ella attends Char's homecoming balls in disguise. On the ball's third night, Hattie unmasks Ella, forcing her to flee and lose one of her glass slippers. Char discovers the slipper and visits Ella at her home. After the two profess their love, Char unknowingly orders Ella to marry him. After an internal struggle, Ella successfully defies the order, hoping to protect him and the kingdom; her unselfish love for Char breaks the spell. She explains everything to him and happily accepts his marriage proposal.

Ella is welcomed warmly into the royal family. Mandy becomes the castle cook and fairy godmother to Char and Ella's future children.

== Characters ==
=== Ella of Frell ===
The novel’s protagonist. She is cursed with the gift of obedience at birth and must follow every order she is given. She goes on a series of misadventures throughout the novel and faces torment from her step-family, but eventually falls in love with Prince Charmont and lives happily ever after.

=== Prince Charmont of Kyrria ===
Ella’s friend, love interest, and eventual romantic partner. He is a loyal friend to Ella and the future king of Kyrria, eventually helping free Ella of her curse when he proposes to her.

=== Mandy ===
A house cook of Ella’s childhood home, later revealed to be Ella's fairy godmother. She supports Ella through her misadventures and treats her with love and respect throughout the book.

=== Sir Peter ===
Ella’s father. Marries Olga to save himself from financial ruin. At the end of the book, he does not visit Ella in the castle.

=== Olga ===
The novel’s main antagonist. She forces her step-daughter Ella into servitude after discovering her curse of obedience.

=== Hattie and Olive ===
Ella’s step-sisters. At finishing school, they bully and torment Ella upon discovering her curse of obedience. Olive tends to blindly follow in Hattie’s footsteps.

=== Lucinda ===
A stubborn but well-meaning fairy who bestowed the gift of obedience upon Ella. She stands behind her choice until the novel, when she repents for her actions and apologizes to Ella.

=== Lady Eleanor ===
Ella’s mother. She maintains a close relationship with her daughter until her death.

== Analysis and themes ==
Critics have expressed that Ella Enchanted blends key aspects of the Cinderella tale while greatly extending them. Cited alongside novels like Meg Cabot’s The Princess Diaries, Levine's novel fits into a category of contemporary fiction that has “taken traditional princess stories and altered them in unexpected ways." In Horn Book, Anne Deifendeifer observed that Levine's “expert characterization and original ideas enliven this novelization of Cinderella."

=== Gender roles and power ===
The story of Ella Enchanted has been described as having a “girl power twist” in comparison to the original source material. Ella is a character who defies the stereotype of women being passive; she is outspoken and empowered when she refuses to accept her curse of obedience, embarking on a series of quests to reclaim her story.

=== Self-actualization and romance ===
Levine's version of Cinderella challenges the notion of a traditional love story. The nature of Ella and Char’s romance “attempt[s] to reimagine Cinderella’s happily ever after in ways that accommodate both a relationship with Prince Charming and a life outside of that relationship," which decenters the heterosexual romance present in many Cinderella narratives.

Ella Enchanted also differentiates from other retellings because she does not meet the Prince at the ball, as Ella and Char have an established relationship long before the balls. Similarly, Ella’s story does not culminate in marriage to Char in the end; instead, Ella continues on into a new chapter in which she rules over the kingdom alongside him.

In the end, Ella's love for Char is what enables her to break the curse, as ultimately, Ella finds that “the power to achieve happily ever after has been inside of [her] the whole time." Scholars have interpreted this difference as feminist, particularly in how Levine and other authors in this genre present romance and marriage as just one component of what makes a modern Cinderella protagonist's life fulfilling.

Their relationship has also been cited as successful and authentic due to the respect they share for one another.

=== Female friendships ===
The relationship between Hattie, Olive, and Ella has also been examined as a catalyst for consumption-driven competition, aggression, or “mean girl” behavior among girls. In these relationships, power is asserted through exclusion, control, and excess.

By contrast, Ella’s friendship with Areida demonstrates pro-social behavior that is grounded in mutual support, generosity, and equality. This offers a model of connection that resists dominance and instead values care and reciprocity.

=== Obedience and willpower ===
Levine has expressed that Ella's curse of obedience fills a logical flaw in the original Cinderella story, explaining exactly why Ella had to obey her stepmother and stepsisters despite the torment they inflicted upon her. Ella’s obedience was key to making her character possible: “the curse was an explanation and the problem that set the whole story going."

Ella’s internal battles have also been described as a “tug-of-war between obedience and rebellion” that many teenage readers would be able to relate to.

== Development and reception ==
Ella Enchanted was Gail Carson Levine’s first novel. She got the idea to write a Cinderella retelling while taking a writing class on children’s books. Levine wrote the novel on the train while commuting from upstate New York to her job in New York City over the course of two years.

Levine has expressed that she loves writing fairy tales and has drawn inspiration from many children’s literature classics, including Peter Pan, Anne of Green Gables, Black Beauty, and Little Women. She once commented: "As a child I loved fairy tales because the story, the what-comes-next, is paramount. As an adult I am fascinated by their logic and illogic."

Ella Enchanted was initially rejected by many major children’s book publishers in America. It took nine years for the book to be published, which happened in 1996. The book was revised in 2011. Critics have described it as “superbly plotted and thoroughly enjoyable."

In 1998, Ella Enchanted received the Newbery Honor, an annual award given by the Association for Library Service to Children, a division of the American Library Association, to the author of the most distinguished contribution to American children's literature.

In 2012, it was ranked number 85 on a list of the top 100 children's novels published by School Library Journal. School Library Journal also called it “A thoroughly enchanting novel that deepens and enriches the original tale." Similarly, ALA Booklist said it’s “As finely designed as a tapestry, with a heroine so spirited that she wins readers’ hearts."

In addition to the Newbery Honor, Ella Enchanted has received over 15 other literary awards. The book had been printed over 150,000 times by October of 1998.

== Adaptations ==
=== Film ===
Ella Enchanted was adapted into a major motion picture by Miramax Films in 2004. The film was directed by Tommy O'Haver and starred Anne Hathaway as Ella and Hugh Dancy as Prince Charmont. The film received mostly mixed reviews, and was criticized for its changes to the source material and addition of new characters.

Levine views the film positively and remained in the process of making and promoting the film. She maintained consulting rights on the film’s script, noting that the producers accepted her notes on the logistics of Ella’s obedience, but not on the film’s plot. Levine has suggested that fans “regard the movie as a separate creative act."

=== Stage musical ===
The book was also adapted into a stage musical by Karen Zacarias and Deborah Wicks in 2017. It won a Helen Hayes Award for Outstanding Musical Adaptation in 2018. Successful productions have been mounted across the DMV area since 2017.

== See also ==
- Gail Carson Levine
- Ella Enchanted (film)
- Cinderella
- Fairy tale
- The Two Princesses of Bamarre
