= Kaho Shimada =

Japanese singer and musical theater actress (born 1963)

- 島田歌穂
- Born: September 19, 1963 (age 62); Tokyo, Minato, Tokyo, Japan
- Occupations: Actress, Singer
- Years active: 1974–present

Kaho Shimada (島田 歌穂, Shimada Kaho; born September 19, 1963) is a Japanese singer and musical theater actress. Born and raised in Minato, Tokyo, she attended Tokyo Municipal Jonan High School. She is an assistant professor of drama at the Osaka University of Arts located in Osaka Prefecture, Japan.

Her father, Takaho Shimada, was a musician who gave voice training to Isao Sasaki. Her mother is Reiko Tsukubane, a jazz singer.

Shimada debuted as an actress at the age of eleven in Ganbare!! Robocon (1974–1977) as Robin-chan.

She is best known for her role as Éponine in the Tokyo production of Les Misérables, which she portrayed in English on the album Les Misérables – The Complete Symphonic Recording. Shimada did not speak any English at all, and learned her entire role in English phonetically for the recording.

In 2013, she played the role of Catherine in the British musical Tomorrow Morning at Theatre Creation, Yūrakuchō, Chiyoda, Tokyo – the Japanese premiere of the award-winning internationally acclaimed show by Laurence Mark Wythe. Her performance was watched by British Queen Elizabeth II.

She is an adherent and a member of the fine arts department of Soka Gakkai, became in 1974.

== Theatre roles ==
- Cinderella (1982)
- Les Misérables – Eponine (Original Japanese Cast, 1987–2001, 2005, 2007, 2011)
- Annie Get Your Gun – Annie Oakley (1988)
- She Loves Me – Ilona Ritter (1988)
- Sweet Charity – Charity Hope (1992)
- And the World Goes 'Round (1998)
- The Rink (1998–2000)
- Fiddler on the Roof – Tzeitel (2001)
- Blood Brothers – Mrs. Johnstone (2003)
- West Side Story – Maria (2004)
- The Beggar's Opera – Lucy Lockit (2006–2008)
- The Light in the Piazza – Margaret Johnson (2007)
- Zorro – Inez (2011)
- Tomorrow Morning – Catherine (2013)
- Billy Elliot – Mrs. Wilkinson (2015–2017)
- Mary Poppins – Bird Woman and Miss Andrew (2018-2026)
- Violet – Old Lady/Hotel Hooker (2020)
- The Producers – Hold Me-Touch Me (2024)

== Film roles ==
- The Fall of Ako Castle (1978)
- Song of Kamuy (2023)
