= Samantha Barks =

British actress (born 1990)

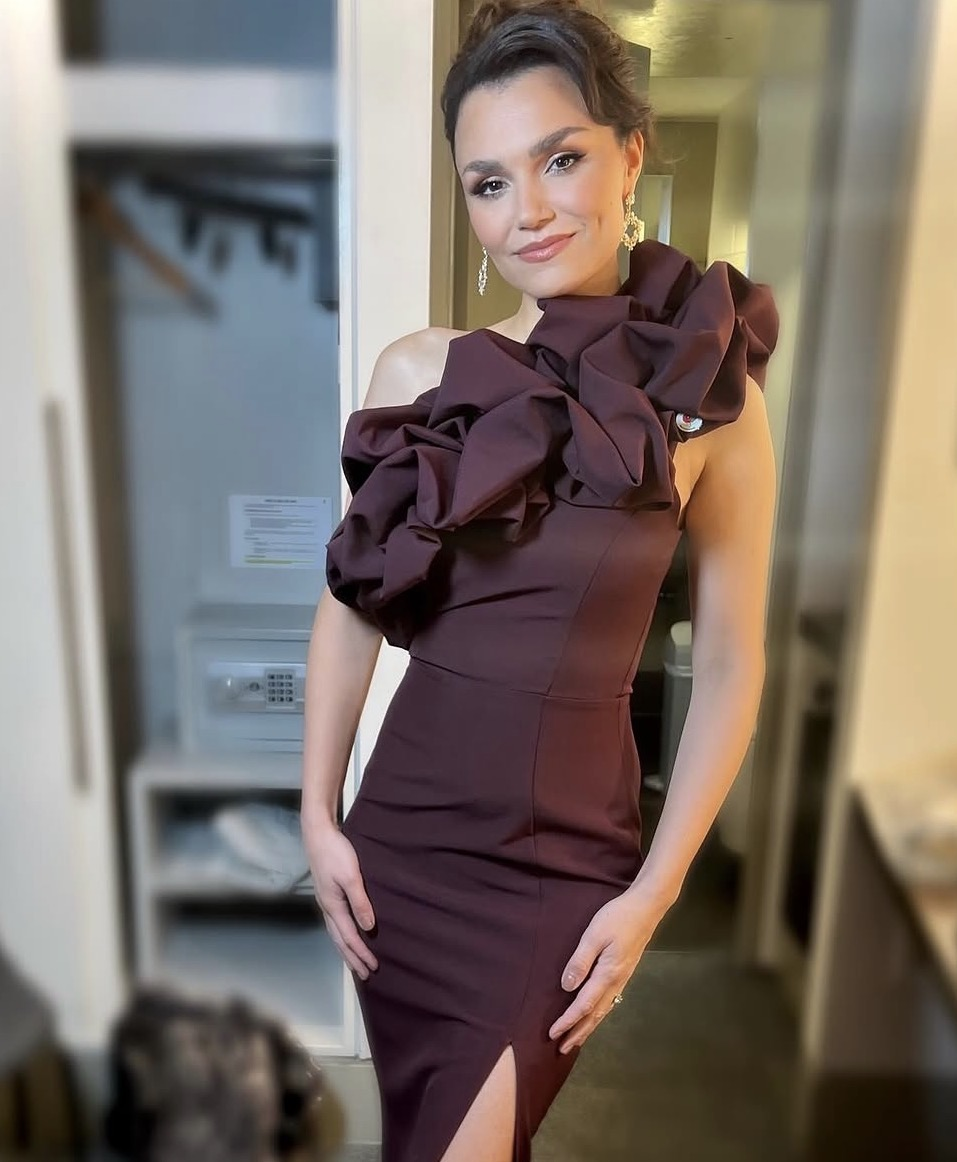
- Barks in 2025
- Born: Samantha Jane Barks; 2 October 1990 (age 35); Laxey, Isle of Man
- Occupations: Actress; singer
- Years active: 2007–present
- Spouse: Alex Michael Stoll (m. 2022)
- Children: 2
- Website: www.samanthabarks.global

Samantha Jane Barks (born 2 October 1990) is a British actress and singer who rose to fame after placing third in the BBC talent show–themed television series I'd Do Anything in 2008. She has released three studio albums: Looking in Your Eyes (2007), Samantha Barks (2016), and Into the Unknown (2021).

Barks made her film debut as Éponine in the Tom Hooper–directed Les Misérables in 2012. Her performance in the film won her the Empire Award for Best Female Newcomer and a shared National Board of Review Award with the film's cast. She starred opposite Jonathan Bailey in the Disney Channel musical-comedy Groove High (2012–2013) and again, in the London revival of the musical The Last Five Years in 2016. In 2018, she originated the role of Vivian Ward in Pretty Woman: The Musical on Broadway. From 2021 to 2024, she starred as Elsa in the West End production of Frozen.

== Early life ==
Barks was born and raised in Laxey on the Isle of Man. Her mother is from Malahide, Ireland. Barks attended Laxey Primary School and St Ninian's High School, Douglas.

When she was 16, Barks moved to London by herself to complete her A levels at the Arts Educational School (ArtsEd) in Chiswick. Her first non-industry job was working at River Island. Barks danced from the age of three, training in ballet, modern and tap with Dancers Barre, then Stagecoach Isle of Man, Theatrix, Stage One Drama School and the Manx Ballet Company.

== Career ==
=== First studio album, I'd Do Anything, and rising popularity (2007–2011) ===
In April 2007, Barks released her debut album, Looking in Your Eyes, which sold around 600 copies. The album featured several songs which she co-wrote and was released on the independent label Brunswick Studios. She performed at the Peel Bay Festival in June 2007 supporting Matt Willis and the Sugababes. In December 2007, Barks represented the Isle of Man in the Maltese International Song Competition where she won the main prize of €2000 and the title of Best Foreign Singer. She sang the song "Nothing Else" from her album and "Play On", a hit song in Malta.

In 2008, Barks competed in I'd Do Anything in which she was one of the finalists in a search for a new, unknown lead to play Nancy in a West End revival of the British musical Oliver!. She reached the final where she finished third. On 29 April 2008, at the midpoint of the competition, Tourism Minister Adrian Earnshaw renamed the Isle of Man to be the "Isle of Sam" as a sign of support. Welcoming signs at Ronaldsway Airport and Douglas Sea Terminal were changed after a renaming ceremony. In week eight of the show, Barks performed "Defying Gravity" from the musical Wicked and in the week leading up to the show she received support from American actress Idina Menzel, who originated the role of Elphaba, the Wicked Witch of the West in Wicked. In week nine, Barks received the lowest number of public votes and so had to participate in the sing-off with Rachel Tucker. They sang "Memory" from the musical Cats. Andrew Lloyd Webber chose to save Barks and eliminate Tucker saying, "Last night Cameron and I were both saying that we thought both of you would be fantastic Nancys and now here am I faced with this. But I've got to make a decision and I've got to think of where the show ultimately for Cameron is going to go and I think I have to go with you, Samantha." In the week leading up to the two part final on 31 May, the Nancy finalists posed for publicity pictures recreating some of Madonna's iconic images. Each Nancy also had a "Master Class" with Liza Minnelli in London. At the end of part one of the final, Barks was announced as finishing third with Andrew Lloyd Webber saying, "Do you know what, I did think this would happen. But you've done so well to have got this far, Samantha." Barks said, "It's been the most amazing experience of my life. Thanks to everyone and the panel for making it so incredible."

Performances in I'd Do Anything
Show	Song	Results
Week one	"I Love Rock 'n' Roll"	Safe
Week two	"See the Day"	Safe
Week three	"Somewhere" from the musical West Side Story	Safe
Week four	"Hurt"	Safe
Week five	"Since U Been Gone"	Safe
Week six	"Sway"	Safe
Week seven	"Survivor"	Safe
Week eight (quarter-final)	"Defying Gravity" from the musical Wicked	Safe
Week nine (semi-final)	"When You Believe" from the film The Prince of Egypt "Memory" from the musical Cats	Bottom two
Week ten (final)	"Anyone Who Had a Heart"	Third place

In June 2008, one month after I'd Do Anything ended, Barks sang the Isle of Man National Anthem "O Land Of Our Birth" on Senior Race day of the Isle of Man TT to begin the races. Barks was then announced to play the lead role of Sally Bowles in the UK tour of Cabaret from 29 August 2008 to 11 July 2009. Barks performed alongside her I'd Do Anything cast-mates Sarah Lark and Jodie Prenger at the Theatregoers Choice Awards in February 2009. Toward the end of her run with Cabaret, Barks put on her own concert, An Audience with Sam Barks, at the Villa Marina on the Isle of Man on 3 January 2009 to thank those that supported her during her time on I'd Do Anything and to thank those that have continued to support her.

Barks launched the new Manx Ship, the Caly Manx, in Shanghai, China on 30 September 2009. Barks, along with Wendy Craig and Jess Conrad, switched on the Christmas Lights in Windsor's town centre on 21 November 2009. Barks officially launched BreastHealth UK's new clinic at the Spire Thames Valley Hospital in Wexham on 27 November 2009. She played the title role in Aladdin during the Christmas Pantomime Season 2009/10 at the Theatre Royal, Windsor.

Barks starred as Éponine in the London production of Les Misérables at the Queen's Theatre from 21 June 2010 to 18 June 2011. Barks was chosen to play Éponine in the 25th Anniversary concert of Les Misérables at the O2 Arena on 3 October 2010 by Cameron Mackintosh, after he saw her play the role in her opening night at the Queens Theatre, in London's West End. Also in 2010, Barks resumed her music career by releasing a song called "Let Go", which she co-wrote with Garry Lake. The single debuted in 2010, but received an official release in 2011 through the independent label Flour Records. Barks promoted the song with a live performance on SB.TV. Barks performed the song at Stuart Matthew Price and James Yeoburn's benefit concert for Dress Circle, the Dress Circle Benefit Gala, on 7 August 2011 at Her Majesty's Theatre and the song was later included on the tribute compilation album Standing Ovation: A CD Tribute to Dress Circle which was released on 17 August 2011.

Barks began 2011 with a starring role in the concert Direct From the West End. Run by a company called "Musical Ovation Ltd" set up by Scott Garnham and Martin Neely, the concert was performed for three nights—23 January in York, 6 February in Oxford and 13 February 2011 in Windsor. The concert featured two hours of songs from popular West End musicals. On 27 February 2011, Barks performed in the concert The Songs of Bobby Cronin at the New Players Theatre. On 20 March, Barks performed in Stars of the West End Sing the Songs of Steven Luke Walker at Charing Cross Theatre. Barks performed "On My Own" at the Classical Brits 2011 at The Royal Albert Hall on 12 May 2011. Barks performed in a concert at the Battersea Barge in London on 21 August 2011, singing works by British composer/lyricists Laurence Mark Wythe, Grant Olding, Dougal Irvine and Tim Sutton. She performed with fellow West End stars Stephen Ashfield, Annalene Beechey and George Ure. Barks performed the Grand Final anthem "Jerusalem" for the Engage Super League Grand Final at Old Trafford on 8 October 2011.

Barks starred as Zoe, opposite Jonathan Bailey's character Tom, in the Disney Channel television series Groove High, a mixture of live-action and animation, which premiered on the Disney Channel UK 10 November 2012. The first season lasted 26 episodes and has been sold to broadcasters across the world. Barks recorded her voice for the series in April 2010, with live-action filming completed in Ireland a year and a half later in October 2011. During an interview in January 2011 Samantha said this of Groove High: "I play Zoe, one of the leads who is really sweet, but also a little feisty, she tells it like it is and doesn't take any rubbish from anybody. It's great because I also get to do a lot of singing for the show." Barks starred as Nancy in the UK tour of Oliver! from 10 December 2011 to 1 April 2012. Barks had planned to perform the entire tour, but temporarily left the tour on 1 April to film Les Miserables. She was replaced on the tour by Cat Simmons.

=== Les Misérables and wider recognition (2012–2014) ===
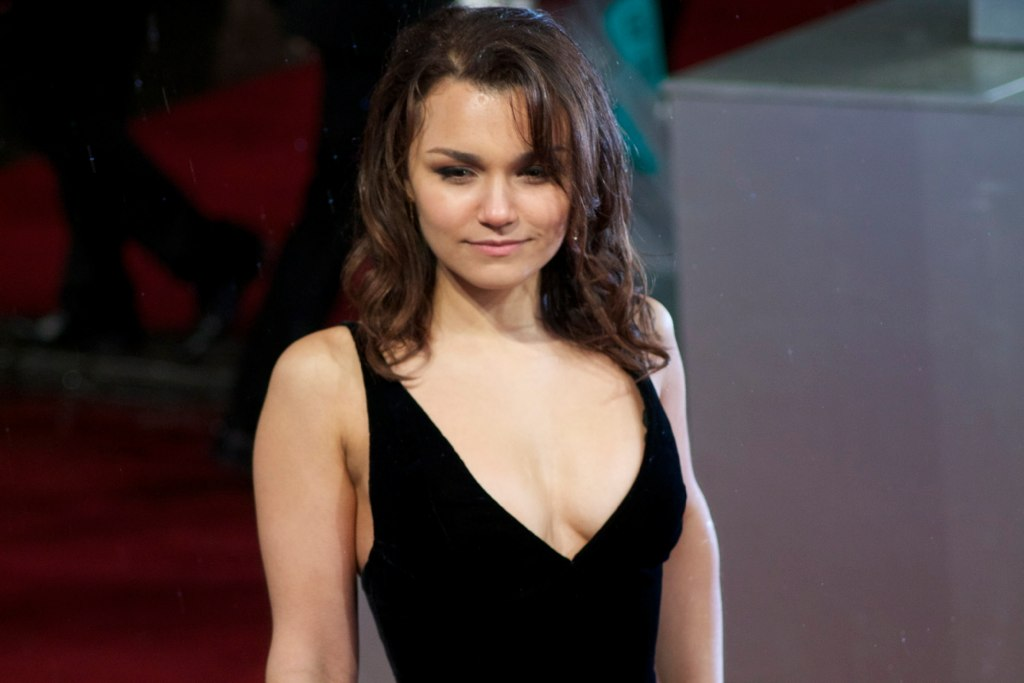
Barks in 2013

Barks reprised her role as Éponine and made her film debut in the 2012 film adaptation of Les Misérables. She learned the news from Cameron Mackintosh during an Oliver! curtain call. During filming for Les Misérables, Barks recorded the song "Defective" for the album Scott Alan Live which was released in December 2012. In June 2012, just days after completing Les Misérables, Barks returned to the UK tour of Oliver! for two weeks at the Edinburgh Playhouse. On 24 June 2012, Barks performed in a Little Women charity concert at the Playhouse Theatre in London.

On 13 October 2012, Barks performed at the Indoor Garden Party concert in New York City's Gramercy Theatre. The concert was part of a concert series created by Russell Crowe and Alan Doyle. Barks performed at another Indoor Garden Party concert at New York City's Joe's Pub on 8 December. In early November 2012, Barks briefly returned to the Oliver! UK tour at the Grand Theatre, Leeds. Barks permanently returned to the Oliver! UK tour on 12 December at Bord Gáis Energy Theatre in Ireland and continued with the tour until 20 February 2013 at the Bristol Hippodrome. She left the show early in order to head to Los Angeles for rehearsals with fellow Les Mis co-stars for their cast performance at the Oscars on 24 February 2013. Her rendition of "On My Own" from Les Miserables reached number 97 on the Billboard Hot 100, and number 43 in the UK, being her first entry on each chart.

On 11 February 2013, Barks won Best Breakthrough Performance at the Elle Style Awards. Barks performed with her co-stars from the film Les Miserables at the 85th Academy Awards ceremony on 24 February 2013. Immediately after the Oscars, Barks flew to the Isle of Man to begin work on her second film, The Christmas Candle. In March 2013, Barks took part in the television special Andrew Lloyd Webber: 40 Musical Years for ITV, performing "Another Suitcase in Another Hall" in honor of Andrew Lloyd Webber. In June 2013, Barks performed at The Recording Academy Honors. The same month, Barks took part in the one-night only 24 Hour Plays at the Broad Stage Theater in Santa Monica, California.

Barks played the role of Velma Kelly in the 2013 production of Chicago at the Hollywood Bowl in July 2013. In late 2013, Barks starred as the romantic lead in Bitter Harvest, a film released in 2017, and co-starring Max Irons and Barry Pepper. In October 2013, Barks played the part of Jules in the private workshop production of a potential musical of Bend It Like Beckham with a score by Howard Goodall, lyrics by Charles Hart, and book by Gurinder Chadha and Paul Mayeda Berges.

Barks had a role in Dracula Untold, which was released on 10 October 2014. She portrayed Baba Yaga, an angelic woman who turns into an evil witch; however, her scenes were cut from the film. In 2014, Barks was cast in the ensemble drama A Hundred Streets and announced she would be returning to West End theatre in the revival of City of Angels directed by Josie Rourke with musical direction by Gareth Valentine and choreography by Stephen Mear.

=== Work on Broadway (2015–2018) ===
In July 2015, Barks began rehearsing for the world premiere of Amélie, A New Musical at the Berkeley Repertory Theatre in California. The show opened on 29 August and had its run extended to 18 October. In January 2016, it was announced that Barks was cast in the movie musical Strike!. Also, in February 2016, it was announced that she would star in the drama Interlude in Prague. In 2016, Barks and her Groove High co-star Jonathan Bailey reunited as the leads in Off-West End production of The Last Five Years at St. James Theatre from 27 October to 3 December 2016. She joined director Jason Robert Brown again for a one-off concert of his musical, Honeymoon in Vegas, at the London Palladium on 12 March 2017, starring alongside Arthur Darvill.

Barks has continued her music career playing at various venues around the UK since her album release. Following her self-titled album release on 10 June 2016, she launched her first solo tour around the UK to promote and perform songs from her album at 13 venues. She performed live in concert at Mayflower Theatre in Southampton alongside guest singer Kerry Ellis on 20 May 2017. Barks made her American solo concert debut with four dates at Feinstein's/54 Below in New York City in July 2017. In September 2017, it was announced that Barks would be playing the role of Vivian (played by Julia Roberts in the film) in the stage musical Pretty Woman. The musical premiered at Chicago's Oriental Theatre in March 2018, before transferring to Broadway in July 2018. Pretty Woman marked her Broadway debut.

=== Return to the West End (2019–present) ===
On 5 December 2019, Barks was cast as Elsa in the West End production of Frozen, beginning in August 2021.

Barks spent several weeks in March and April 2022 presenting the Elaine Paige on Sunday radio show on BBC Radio 2. In December 2022, it was announced that Barks would be doing a solo concert at the Theatre Royal, Drury Lane in May 2023. Orfeh, Bradley Jaden and The Overtones will appear as special guests. In May 2023, it was announced that Barks would be a judge on the upcoming ITV competition show Mamma Mia! I Have a Dream alongside Alan Carr, Jessie Ware, and Amber Riley. The show will follow the search for two musical theatre performers to play the roles of Sophie and Sky in Mamma Mia! in London's West End for its 25th anniversary. In 2025, Barks participated in and won the sixth series of The Masked Singer as "Pufferfish".

In October 2025 it was announced that Barks will be joining the cast of the world premiere of the musical of The Greatest Showman in the role of Charity Barnum, together with Oliver Tompsett as P. T. Barnum, Lorna Courtney as Anne Wheeler, Ben Joyce as Phillip Carlyle, Vajèn van den Bosch as Jenny Lind and Malinda Parris as Lettie Lutz.

== Personal life ==
Barks is a vegetarian. On 1 February 2021, she became engaged to actor Alex Michael Stoll, whom she met while they were both in the Broadway production of Pretty Woman. Their wedding took place in Tuscany on 18 June 2022. On 1 August 2023 Barks revealed via her Instagram profile that the couple were expecting their first child. She gave birth to a son on 16 October. She took maternity leave from Frozen and returned on February 7, 2024. On 8 May 2025 she revealed she was expecting her second child during the broadcast of 'VE Day 80: A Celebration To Remember' on BBC One. She gave birth to a daughter in June 2025.

== Filmography ==
=== Film ===
Year	Title	Role	Notes	Ref.
2010	Les Misérables in Concert: The 25th Anniversary	Éponine		
2012	Les Misérables	Éponine		
2013	The Christmas Candle	Emily Barstow		
2013	Jack and the Cuckoo-Clock Heart	Miss Acacia	English-language voice	
2015	A Hundred Streets	Lotte		
2015	The Canary	Emaline	Short film	
2017	Bitter Harvest	Natalka		
2017	Interlude in Prague	Josefa Duchek		
2019	For Love or Money	Connie		
2021	First Date	Casey		
2022	Tomorrow Morning	Catherine		
2025	Frozen	Elsa	Live recording of stage musical	

=== Television ===
Year	Title	Role	Notes	Ref.
2008	I'd Do Anything	Herself	Contestant; third place	
2012	Groove High	Zoe Myer	Disney Channel series	
2014	Robot Chicken	Elizabeth James; Selina Kyle; Sabrina Duncan	Voice role; episode: "Legion of Super-Gyros"	
2016	Bear Grylls: Mission Survive	Herself		
2021	All Star Musicals	Herself	Judge	
2022	Rob & Romesh Vs	Herself	Episode: West End	
2023	Mamma Mia! I Have a Dream	Judge		
2025	The Masked Singer UK	Pufferfish	Series 6 Winner	

== Stage ==
Year	Title	Role	Theatre	Location	Ref.
2008–2009	Cabaret	Sally Bowles	—N/a	UK National Tour	
2010–2011	Les Misérables	Éponine	Queen's Theatre	West End	
2010	Les Misérables	Éponine	The O2 Arena	London	
2011–2013	Oliver!	Nancy	—N/a	UK National Tour	
2013	Chicago	Velma Kelly	Hollywood Bowl	Los Angeles	
2014	City of Angels	Mallory / Avril	Donmar Warehouse	Off-West End	
2015	Amélie	Amélie	Berkeley Repertory Theatre	California	
2016	The Last Five Years	Cathy Hiatt	The Other Palace	Off-West End	
2017	Honeymoon in Vegas	Betsy Nolan	London Palladium	West End	
2018	Pretty Woman: The Musical	Vivian Ward	Oriental Theatre	Chicago	
2018–2019	Pretty Woman: The Musical	Vivian Ward	Nederlander Theatre	Broadway	
2020	Chess	Florence	Umeda Arts Theater	Tokyo International Forum	
2021–2024	Frozen	Elsa	Theatre Royal, Drury Lane	West End	
2022	Chess	Florence	Theatre Royal, Drury Lane	West End	
2026	The Greatest Showman	Charity Barnum	Bristol Hippodrome	World premiere	
2026	Les Misérables	Fantine	Sondheim Theatre	West End	
2026	Les Misérables	Fantine	Arena Birmingham	International Concert Tour	
2026	Les Misérables	Fantine	Royal Albert Hall	International Concert Tour	
2026	Les Misérables	Fantine	Radio City Music Hall	International Concert Tour	

== Discography ==
Release date	Title	Format	Label	Ref.
2007	Looking In Your Eyes	Debut album	Brunswick Studios	
2010	"Strong Without You"	Song from the album Move with Every Line: The Music of Tim Prottey-Jones	My Protégé Records	
2011	"Let Go"	Single	Flour Records	
2011	"Tir Na N'og"	Song from Acoustic Overtures: The Songs of Dougal Irvine	Simon Greiff/SimG Records	
2012	"Defective"	Song from the album Scott Alan Live	Billy-Boo Records	
2012	Les Misérables: Highlights from the Motion Picture Soundtrack	Cast recording of the film	Universal Republic Records	
2013	Les Misérables: Original Motion Picture Soundtrack	Cast recording of the film	Universal Republic Records	
2014	"You Fixed My Broken Wings"	Song from the album Love on 42nd Street	DLC Records	
2016	"Love in a Place Like This" (with Marc Devigne)	Single	Danny Schur Records	
2016	Samantha Barks	Second studio album	United Agents Records	
2021	Into the Unknown	Third studio album	Westway Music Ltd	

== Awards and nominations ==
Year	Award	Category	Work	Result	Ref.
2012	Awards Circuit Community Awards	Best Cast Ensemble	Les Misérables	Won	
2012	Chicago Film Critics Association Awards	Most Promising Performer	Les Misérables	Nominated	
2012	EDA Female Focus Awards	Best Breakthrough Performance	Les Misérables	Nominated	
2012	Hollywood Film Awards	Spotlight Award	Les Misérables	Won	
2012	Phoenix Film Critics Society Awards	Best Ensemble Acting	Les Misérables	Nominated	
2012	San Diego Film Critics Society Awards	Best Supporting Actress	Les Misérables	Nominated	
2012	San Diego Film Critics Society Awards	Best Ensemble Performance	Les Misérables	Nominated	
2012	Satellite Awards	Best Actress in a Supporting Role	Les Misérables	Nominated	
2012	Satellite Awards	Best Ensemble - Motion Picture	Les Misérables	Won	
2012	Washington D.C. Area Film Critics Association Awards	Best Supporting Actress	Les Misérables	Nominated	
2013	Central Ohio Film Critics Association Awards	Best Ensemble	Les Misérables	Nominated	
2013	Elle Style Awards	Best Breakthrough Performance	Les Misérables	Won	
2013	Empire Awards	Best Female Newcomer	Les Misérables	Won	
2013	Glamour Awards	Pandora Breakthrough	Les Misérables	Won	
2013	Gold Derby Awards	Ensemble Cast	Les Misérables	Nominated	
2013	Gold Derby Awards	Breakthrough Performer	Les Misérables	Nominated	
2013	London Critics Circle Film Awards	Young British Performer of the Year	Les Misérables	Nominated	
2013	National Board of Review Awards	Best Acting by an Ensemble	Les Misérables	Won	
2013	Screen Actors Guild Awards	Outstanding Performance by a Cast in a Motion Picture	Les Misérables	Nominated	
2013	Online Film and Television Association Awards	Best Breakthrough Performance: Female	Les Misérables	Nominated	
2013	Online Film and Television Association Awards	Best Music, Adapted Song	"One Day More" in Les Misérables	Nominated	
2022	WhatsOnStage Awards	Best Actress in a Musical	Frozen	Nominated	
