= Renee Brna =

American actress and singer

- Born: Renee Brna
- Occupation(s): Actress and singer
- Website: reneebrna.org

Renee Brna is an American actress and singer. Brna is best known as Meg in the 1st national Broadway tour of Little Women the musical starring Maureen McGovern with Autumn Hurlbert as Beth, Katie Fisher as Jo and Gwen Hollander as Amy. She went on to understudy the leading role of Young Alex/Aaron Ashbrook and Young Thomas Ledbury in the 2007 London transfer to Broadway Coram Boy at the Imperial Theatre. Under the direction of Melly Still the production garnered six Tony Award nominations.

== Career ==
Brna is a member of Actors Equity Association and has numerous regional and touring credits, including: the first national tour of Oklahoma!, starring as Magnolia in Show Boat, Closer Than Ever at the Edinburgh Fringe Festival, Rosemary in How to Succeed in Business Without Really Trying, and Juliet in Romeo and Juliet.

For South Coast Repertory Brna originated the starring role of Jane in the world premiere of Jane of the Jungle which opened on May 25, 2012

In 2005 Brna played Meg in the first national Broadway tour of the musical Little Women written by Jason Howland and Mindi Dickstein and directed by Susan Schulman. In the role she was described by the San Francisco Chronicle as "a lovely, composed Meg...sweetly empathetic with Jo. She and Michael Minarik [were] particularly appealing in the 'More Than I Am' duet." The tour opened at the San Diego Civic Center and made stops at the Kennedy Center's Opera House (Washington D.C.), Pantages Theatre (Los Angeles), Cadillac Palace Theatre (Chicago), Shubert Theatre (New Haven, CT), Opera House (Boston), and Paramount Theatre (Seattle) to name a few of the 31 tour stops.

After making her Broadway debut in Coram Boy, Brna went on to play Cosette in the regional premiere of Les Misérables at North Shore Music Theatre starring Fred Inkley. She was commended for bringing a "fine soprano to the demanding role of the adult Cosette, who soars into the vocal stratosphere".

In November 2009 Brna appeared alongside Tony-nominated Brad Oscar in the joint production of Barnum at Asolo Repertory Theatre and Maltz Jupiter Theatre, directed by Gordon Greenberg. She was praised as a "soaring soprano" for her performance of Swedish nightingale Jenny Lind.

She went on to star as Eliza Doolittle in the 2009 production of My Fair Lady at the West Virginia Public Theatre directed by Broadway veteran Michael Licata.

She teamed up with It's Always Sunny in Philadelphia director Heath Cullens and writer Cormac Bluestone to play the title role in the musical short, The Botanist's Wife for the 48 Hour Film Project which won the festival award for Best music in 2010.

That year she starred opposite Michael Brian Dunn in the York Theatre's staged reading of the musical Rogues to Riches.

Brna starred as Julia in the 2011 Regional Premiere of The Wedding Singer musical directed by Larry Raben. She was reviewed being "marvelous as Julia, as adorable as can be—and with vocal pipes to match". The cast included Derek Keeling from NBC's Grease: You're the One That I Want!, Mary Jo Catlett as Rosie and American Idol finalist Todrick D. Hall. She was reviewed as "a charmer, boasting a wonderful singing voice and an endearing quality that helps anchor the broadly funny shenanigans with genuine heart" as Julia.
