= Bailey Hanks =

American singer, actress, and dancer (born 1988)

Bailey Hanks Weidman
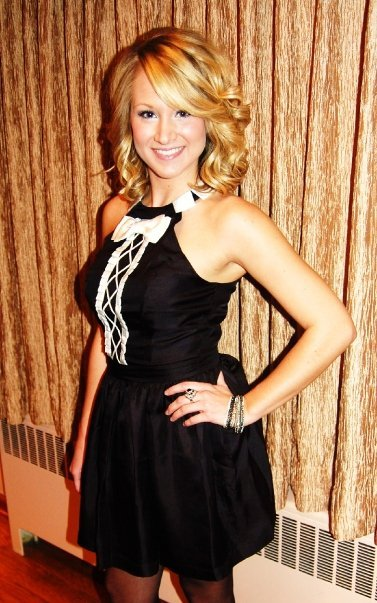
- Hanks in Mumbai
- Born: February 6, 1988 (age 38); Anderson, South Carolina
- Education: Tri-County Technical College; Coastal Carolina University
- Occupations: Stage and television actress, singer, dancer
- Spouse: Jason Weidman (m. 2014)
- Children: 2

Bailey Noel Hanks Weidman (born Bailey Noel Hanks; February 6, 1988) is an American singer, actress, and dancer best known for winning MTV's Legally Blonde: The Musical – The Search for Elle Woods. She performed on Broadway as Elle Woods in Legally Blonde: The Musical in 2008.

== Early life and career ==
Hanks was born on February 6, 1988, in Anderson, South Carolina, to Brad and Angie Hanks. She has one older sister, Brooke, and one younger sister, Bradlee. Her father is a pastor and youth minister in addition to being a highway patrolman, and her mother is a nurse. Hanks attended Westside High School in Anderson. She transferred to and graduated from Pendleton High School in 2006.

Hanks performed the National Anthem for president Bill Clinton in 2000, at age 12.

Growing up in local theater, her notable appearances were as Dorothy in The Wizard of Oz; Gertrude McFuzz in Seussical the Musical; Elle Woods in Legally Blonde; Baby June in Gypsy; Hello, Dolly!; The Music Man; A Year With Frog and Toad; Annie; Bye Bye Birdie; A Funny Thing Happened on the Way to the Forum; and High Steppin' Country.

Hanks was crowned Miss Liberty Teen 2005 and competed in the Miss SC Teen Pageant.

She attended Tri-County Technical College in Pendleton, South Carolina, as well as Coastal Carolina University, where she was a member of the Gamma Phi Beta sorority, though she did not graduate.

== Career ==
In 2008 Hanks appeared on the reality television show Legally Blonde: The Musical – The Search for Elle Woods and was declared the winner. She made her Broadway debut as Elle Woods in Legally Blonde at the Palace Theatre on July 23, 2008, and continued performing in the role until the musical ended its run on October 19, 2008. Later that year she starred as Sharpay Evans in a production of High School Musical which ran from November 5 to December 7, 2008, at the Paper Mill Playhouse.

Hanks appeared in the daytime television soap opera Guiding Light in April 2009.

She played the part of the NYU Tour Guide in the third installment of Touchstone Pictures' "Step Up" franchise. The film, titled Step Up 3D, premiered in August 2010.

== Personal life ==
Hanks currently resides in Piedmont, South Carolina. Hanks is currently Worship Leader at her father's church, Living Hope, and is a hair stylist. Hanks married Jason Weidman in 2014. They have two daughters.

== Work ==
=== Stage ===
Year	Title	Role	Notes
2008	Legally Blonde: The Musical	Elle Woods	Broadway debut; Palace Theatre
2008	High School Musical	Sharpay Evans	Paper Mill Playhouse
2009	VOTE!		New York International Fringe Festival
2009	Freckleface Strawberry	Emily	Manhattan Movement Arts Center
2012	Legally Blonde: The Musical	Elle Woods	Diablo Theatre Company
2012	Legally Blonde: The Musical	Elle Woods	Red Mountain Theatre
2012	9 to 5: The Musical	Doralee Rhodes	Roxy Regional Theatre

=== Television ===
Year	Title	Role	Notes
2008	Legally Blonde: The Musical – The Search for Elle Woods	Self	Winner
2009	Guiding Light	Amy	2 episodes
2010	Wiener & Wiener	Bridgette's assistant	Webseries

=== Film ===
Year	Title	Role	Notes
2010	Step Up 3D	NYU Tour Guide	
