= Legally Blonde: The Musical: The Search for Elle Woods =

- Official logo
- Country of origin: United States
- No. of seasons: 1
- No. of episodes: 8

Production
- Running time: 44
- Production companies: MGM Television; MTV

Original release
- Network: MTV
- Release: June 2 – July 21, 2008

Legally Blonde: The Musical: The Search for Elle Woods is an MTV program created in order to cast an actress to replace Laura Bell Bundy in the role of Elle Woods in the Broadway production of Legally Blonde: The Musical. The show debuted on June 2, 2008.

The winner of the show, Bailey Hanks, in addition to being cast in the role, was given the opportunity to record her own single of the musical's first-act closer, "So Much Better". The show concluded on July 21, 2008. Autumn Hurlbert was the runner up. She served as Hanks' understudy and performed in the ensemble of the show (replacing Becky Gulsvig who left to join the tour). Bundy's last performance in the musical was on July 20, 2008. Hanks began performances on July 23, 2008, and remained with the show until it closed on October 19, 2008.

Two other show finalists, Rhiannon Hansen and Lauren Zakrin, performed in the "Legally Blonde" national tour. Hansen played Margot, and Zakrin performed in the ensemble as well serving as understudy to Becky Gulsvig as Elle Woods.

The show began with 15 contestants. All except the winner were eliminated over eight episodes, in which they performed songs and faced other challenges. A three-judge panel made the elimination decisions. Most episodes involved a small prize for the winner of the challenge, which could be shared with another contestant of the winner's choosing.

== Judges and mentors ==
- Haylie Duff, singer, actress, and Broadway Performer
- Jerry Mitchell, director and choreographer of Legally Blonde: The Musical
- Paul Canaan, ensemble member of Legally Blonde: The Musical
- Bernard Telsey, casting director
- Heather Hach, librettist of Legally Blonde: The Musical
- Seth Rudetsky, musician, comedian, actor, writer, vocal coach
- Denis Jones, Associate Choreographer of Legally Blonde: The Musical
- Marc Bruni, associate director of Legally Blonde: The Musical

== Contestants ==
Name	Age^{1}	Hometown	Status
Bailey Hanks	20	Anderson, South Carolina	Winner
Autumn Hurlbert	28	Mesa, Arizona	2nd Place
Rhiannon Hansen	19	Logan, Utah	3rd Place
Lauren Zakrin	18	Rochester, Michigan	Eliminated 7th
Natalie Lander	25	Malibu, California	Eliminated 6th
Emma Zaks	26	Bronx, New York	Eliminated 5th
Cassie Silva	19	Los Angeles, California	Eliminated 3rd
Celina Carvajal	28	San Francisco, California	Eliminated 3rd
Lindsey Ridgway	24	Chicago, Illinois	Eliminated 2nd
Cassie Okenka	22	Toledo, Ohio	Eliminated 1st

- ^1Age at the time of filming.

== Episode summaries ==
In each episode, the contestants met different cast members from the Broadway cast of Legally Blonde: The Musical. They also studied a song from the show and faced various tests and challenges that were evaluated by the panel of judges. Most weeks, a challenge winner received a special prize to help them for the upcoming audition.

Episode Number 1 – "You're Cut" (Originally aired June 2, 2008)

50 contestants traveled to New York hoping to star as the next Elle Woods in Legally Blonde: The Musical. An initial dance audition ensued, and the field was narrowed down to 15 contestants. The 15 contestants learned the song "So Much Better,” and a dance. Later on, the contestants auditioned for the judges. Five contestants were eliminated as the judges were not satisfied with their singing and dancing, leaving 10 remaining contestants. The 10 contestants were moved to a penthouse to stay for the next 8 weeks for their upcoming auditions.

Episode Number 2 – "And Then There Were 10" (Originally aired June 9, 2008)

Episode 2 was focused on acting. Scene partner Nikki Snelson (who played Brooke Wyndham in the musical) purposely drops a line during the contestants' auditions to see how the contestants react if their scene partner forgets a line. The contestants also learned the song, "Delta Nu Nu Nu". The challenge winner, Bailey Hanks, won personal time with Nikki Snelson. She shared the prize with Ridgway.

Episode Number 3 – "Omigod, She Threw Us Under the Bus!" (Originally aired June 16, 2008)

After a grueling vocal workshop on spin bikes to test the contestants' stamina, Silva isolates herself from the other contestants by complaining to the judges that the other contestants failed to give their all during her rehearsals. The episode also focused on the song "Omigod You Guys". The prize was a manicure and pedicure with Orfeh (who played Paulette in the musical), won by Zakrin and shared with Silva.

Episode Number 4 – "It's Time to Get Serious" (Originally aired June 23, 2008)

The top eight contestants experience illness and nerves, while learning the song "Serious" and performing a challenging comedic scene. The prize was a date with Richard H. Blake (who played Warner Huntington III in the musical), won by Hurlbert and shared with Carvajal.

Episode Number 5 – "These Pink Boots Are Made For Dancing" (Originally aired June 30, 2008)

The six contestants test their dancing skills on the cobblestoned streets of Brooklyn and face a Hip-Hop dancing challenge ("Shake Your Junk" dance sequence). The song for the episode was "Positive". Lander won a yoga lesson with Kate Shindle (who played Vivienne Kensington in the musical), which she shared with Hansen.

Episode Number 6 – "Blonde to the Bone" (Originally aired July 7, 2008)

The final five contestants were given makeovers and performed the ballad "Legally Blonde." The episode's challenge involved modeling, and the featured song was "Legally Blonde". Lander won a lunch date with Andy Karl (who played Kyle The UPS Guy and understudied Emmett in the musical).

Episode Number 7 – "Triple Threat Test" (Originally aired July 14, 2008)

Four finalists auditioned with a challenging number that tested their singing, acting and dancing abilities. Their costume change skills were also tested, as was their stamina. The song featured was "What You Want". All the contestants won dinner at the loft and Legally Blonde-style Tiffany necklaces.

Episode Number 8 – "A Star is Born!" (Originally aired July 21, 2008)

Hurlbert and Hanks performed three Legally Blonde numbers live at the Palace Theatre on Broadway, and Hanks was declared the winner. The three songs were "Omigod You Guys", "Positive" and "So Much Better". In addition to winning a contract to perform the role of Elle Woods on Broadway for at least three months, Hanks was given the opportunity to record her own single of the musical's first-act closer, "So Much Better". Hurlbert, as the runner up, will act as Hanks' understudy and perform in the ensemble of the show. Zakrin, the third runner up, will understudy the tour's Elle Woods, Becky Gulsvig, and will also be a member of the ensemble. And, Hansen, the second runner up, will play the role of Margot, Elle's best friend, on tour, as well as understudying Elle.

== Broadway cast appearances ==
In each episode, the contestants meet a cast member from Legally Blonde: The Musical. Usually, these opportunities were awarded as prizes.

- Episode 1: Jerry Mitchell (Director), Laura Bell Bundy (Elle Woods)
- Episode 2: Nikki Snelson (Brooke Wyndham)
- Episode 3: Orfeh (Paulette Bonafonté)
- Episode 4: Boo-Boo (Bruiser), Teddy (Bruiser), William Berloni (animal trainer), Richard H. Blake (Warner Huntington III)
- Episode 5: Kate Shindle (Vivienne Kensington), Nick Kenkel (Ensemble)
- Episode 6: Laura Bell Bundy, Andy Karl (Grandmaster Chad/Dewey/Kyle; u/s Emmett Forrest)
- Episode 7: Rusty Mowery (Dance Captain, Swing), Michelle Kittrell (Ensemble, Dance Captain), Asmeret Ghebremichael (Pilar), April Berry (Ensemble/Kristine the Delta Nu), Manuel Herrera (Ensemble/Nikos), and Nick Kenkel (Ensemble)
- Episode 8: Jerry Mitchell, and current cast members

== Auditions ==
These were the following auditions or workshops for each episode. These are similar to "challenges" on other reality shows.

- Episode 1: Dancing/Singing
- Episode 2: Acting
- Episode 3: Stamina
- Episode 4: Bonding with Bruiser
- Episode 5: Hip-Hop Dancing
- Episode 6: Becoming Elle/Modeling
- Episode 7: Being a Triple Threat (Singing, Dancing, Acting)/Costume Changes/Stamina
- Episode 8: Performing Live at the Palace Theatre

== Musical numbers ==
These were the musical numbers from the Broadway show that the contestants were taught during each episode.

- Episode 1: So Much Better
- Episode 2: Delta Nu Nu Nu
- Episode 3: Omigod You Guys
- Episode 4: Serious
- Episode 5: Positive ("Shake Your Junk" Dance sequence)
- Episode 6: Legally Blonde
- Episode 7: What You Want
- Episode 8: Omigod You Guys, Positive, and So Much Better

== Rewards/Gifts ==
- Episode 1: None
- Episode 2: Personal time with Nikki Snelson. Won by Hanks and shared with Ridgway.
- Episode 3: Manicure and pedicure with Orfeh. Won by Zakrin and shared with Silva
- Episode 4: A date with Richard H. Blake. Won by Hurlbert and shared with Carvajal.
- Episode 5: Yoga lesson with Kate Shindle. Won by Lander and shared with Hansen.
- Episode 6: Lunch date with Andy Karl. Won by Lander.
- Episode 7: Dinner at the loft and Legally Blonde-style Tiffany necklaces. Shared by all of the contestants.
- Episode 8: Becoming Elle Woods. Won by Hanks.

== Competition ==
=== Elimination process ===
During the course of the auditions, the three judges determine which contestants to eliminate and which ones to continue in the competition. After the judges figure out who will go and who will stay they write the names down, in order by best audition, on "the list" similar to the one referred to during the song So Much Better. Haylie Duff is then given the list and announces the list in order. The remaining contestants who are not on the list must immediately head to the building's casting office where the three judges will determine the eliminated contestant.

=== Elimination chart ===
Call-Out Order
Number	List	Episodes								
Number	List	1	2	3	4	5	6	7	8	
01	Hurlbert	Hanks	Hanks	Hurlbert	Hansen	Lander^{1}	Hurlbert	Hurlbert	Hurlbert	Hanks
02	Hanks	Ridgway	Zakrin	Hanks	Zaks	Hanks	Zakrin	Hanks	Hanks	Hurlbert
03	Okenka	Okenka	Zaks	Lander	Zakrin	Zakrin	Hanks	Hansen^{3}	Hansen^{4}	
04	Silva	Hurlbert	Lander	Hansen	Hanks	Hansen	Hansen	Zakrin^{2}		
05	Carvajal	Lander	Hansen	Silva	Lander	Hurlbert	Lander			
06	Chloe	Carvajal	Hurlbert	Zaks	Hurlbert	Zaks				
07	Zaks	Emma	Carvajal	Carvajal	Silva					
08	Zakrin	Silva	Ridgway	Zakrin	Carvajal					
09	Libby	Zakrin	Silva	Ridgway						
10	Ridgway	Hansen	Okenka							
11	Mara	Rachel								
12	Mary	Mara								
13	Lander	Mary								
14	Rachel	Libby								
15	Hansen	Chloe								

The contestant won the role of Elle Woods in Legally Blonde: The Musical.
The contestant won the reward challenge.
The contestant was not on the casting list but remained in the competition.
The contestant won the reward challenge but was not on the casting list and remained in the competition.
The contestant won the reward challenge, but was eliminated.
The contestant was eliminated.

- ^1In episode 5, the panel of judges informed Lander that she would be on the list prior to the official announcement of the list.
- ^2In episode 7 there was no one on the casting list. Additionally, Zakrin was eliminated before Hurlbert, Hanks, or Hansen were told they were safe, so they are listed alphabetically.
- ^3On a Zoom reunion call held in April 2020, Hansen revealed that although all four contestants shared the reward, she won the final challenge.
- ^4This elimination is based on the performances in episode 7. It narrowed down the competition to two contestants before the second elimination in episode 8, which determined the winner. Also, Hansen's elimination was announced before Hurlbert and Hanks's continuing, so they are listed alphabetically.

== After the show ==
Hanks was chosen as the winner by Jerry Mitchell during her final audition at the Palace Theatre.

Autumn Hurlbert was declared the runner-up and served as Hanks' understudy while also performing in the ensemble.

Finalists Rhiannon Hansen (3rd place) and Lauren Zakrin (4th place) participated in the musical's first national tour, respectively, as Margot and as the understudy for Elle. Zakrin later starred in the first National Tour of Wicked in the ensemble and as an understudy for Glinda. Zakrin also closed the Broadway company of Rock of Ages as Sherrie Christian. Zakrin was in the ensemble and an understudy for Natasha in Natasha, Pierre & The Great Comet of 1812 on Broadway, and was with the show in its two previous iterations Off-Broadway. She originated the role of Kathryn Merteuil in Cruel Intentions: The Musical. She most recently was in the ensemble of Jesus Christ Superstar Live in Concert.

Lander lives in Los Angeles and has prominent recurring guest star roles on ABC's The Middle, TV Land's Lopez with George Lopez, and TNT's Major Crimes. She was also a series regular on the Disney Junior show Goldie & Bear voicing "Goldie." Lander has over 80 credits on IMDb that include TV, film, animation, and video game roles. Her father was David L. Lander, who played Squiggy on Laverne & Shirley.

Cassie Silva originated the role of Mrs. Wormwood on the first National Tour of Matilda after originally appearing in the Broadway company. She joined the Broadway company of Six as an alternate in 2022. In 2024, she performed as Anne Boleyn in the Six national tour.

Celina Carvajal now goes by a shorter version of her name, Lena Hall. She has gone on to originate the role of Nicola in Kinky Boots and has also performed as Yitzak in the 2014 revival of Hedwig and the Angry Inch with Neil Patrick Harris. The role of Yitzak earned her a Tony for Best Featured Actress in a Musical in 2014. Hall is also the lead singer of the band The Deafening.

Emma Zaks, daughter to Tony-Winning Director Jerry Zaks, went on to perform in the Broadway revival of Hair.

Cassie Okenka performed as Dorothy Gale in the national tour of The Wizard of Oz, was the understudy to Bonnie in Bonnie and Clyde on Broadway and recently performed in the 1st National Tour of Wicked in the ensemble and as an understudy for Glinda. Okenka appeared in School of Rock on Broadway where she understudied Patty.

Rachel Potter performed in the ensemble of the second National Tour of Wicked and as an understudy for Glinda from August 2010 to February 2011, as Wednesday in The Addams Family on Broadway from March 2011 to December 2011 and played The Mistress in the first Broadway revival of Evita in 2012. Potter competed on the 3rd season of The X Factor singing competition show in 2013, and was eliminated during the third live show.

Libby Servais performed as an original cast member of the second National Tour of Wicked from March 2009 to February 2010 in the ensemble and as an understudy for Glinda. She became the standby for Glinda in the San Francisco company of the show from February 2010 to September 2010, when the production closed. She was a standby for several roles in the original Broadway musical Lysistrata Jones.

In Summer 2018, many of the contestants participated in a 10 year reunion concert at 54 Below.

On April 11, 2020 theatre producer Jen Sandler and YouTuber Tim Murray livestreamed a reunion of all the cast members. The contestants talked about the unseen parts of being on the show and all the fabricated drama. They also mentioned where they are now and how the show affected them.
