= Laurence Mark Wythe =

English composer, lyricist and writer

- Born: Laurence Mark Wythe
- Occupations: Composer, lyricist
- Website: http://www.laurencemarkwythe.com

Laurence Mark Wythe is an English composer, lyricist and writer for West End, international and Off-Broadway musicals. He is principally known for the off-Broadway musical Tomorrow Morning (2011), Through the Door and Midnight. Tomorrow Morning won the Jeff Award in Chicago for Best Musical (midsize) in 2009. The musical opened at the Landor Theatre in South London in October 2010, and off-Broadway at the Theatre at Saint Peters on Lexington Avenue in New York on 31 March 2011 and has played all over the world. Also: Creatives written with Irvine Welsh has been seen in the US and the UK; Extraordinary was produced by the University of Central Lancashire in 2017. He has also written one play's incidental music (Fucking Men by Joe DiPietro). The movie adaptation of Tomorrow Morning was shot in 2021 and will be released by Kaleidoscope Films in 2022, starring Samantha Barks and Ramin Karimloo with Omid Djalili, Fleur East, Joan Collins, Henry Goodman and Harriet Thorpe.

Tomorrow Morning has now been seen on four continents in multiple languages. He wrote Through the Door (book by Judy Freed) which was seen in the West End at Trafalgar Studios in 2009 starring Julie Atherton and Paul Keating and later had a Broadway presentation in 2011 starring Broadway star Kerry Butler. The show has seen multiple productions in Seoul, Korea. In 2013 he wrote music for television channel Nickelodeon. He wrote the musical Midnight with bookwriter Timothy Knapmann, which ran in London in 2018, and in Korea in 2018 and 2019 and is currently playing in Seoul. In 2017 he composed the score for the independent film Last Laugh written by John Godber. His musical GROWL! with Tim Knapman was produced by the NYMT (National Youth Music Theatre) in 2019 after development workshops in 2018. Their musical Danni Hero (originally Danny Hero) was commissioned by Made in Corby and performed at the Core at Corby Cube in England and ran in October 2016.

== Awards ==
All Whythe's award nominations/winners have come from the musical Tomorrow Morning.

Outstanding New Off-Broadway Musical Outer Critics Circle Awards (Nominee)
Best New Musical Off-Broadway Alliance Awards 2011 (Nominee)
Best Musical BestofOffBroadway.com Tina Awards 2011 (Nominee)
Best Ensemble BestofOffBroadway.com Tina Awards 2011 (Nominee)
Best Actress in a Musical BestofOffBroadway.com Tina Awards 2011 (Nominee)
Best Musical (midsize) 2009 Jeff Awards, Chicago (Winner)
Best Artistic Specialization 2009 Jeff Awards Chicago (Winner).
Best Musical UK Theatre Radio's Best Musical 2006(Nominee).

== Career ==
Wythe began his career as an actor in musical theatre appearing in stage productions including Peter Pan at the Cambridge Theatre in the West End, and The Secret Garden at Manchester Library Theatre. He later became a musical director before concentrating on writing and composing. He has also spent time teaching/lecturing in musical theatre in the UK and US.

Tomorrow Morning ran off Broadway in 2011. Prior to this it played at the Greenhouse Theatre in Chicago for a limited six-week run in 2008, receiving strong notices from all the major Chicago critics including Chris Jones at the Chicago Tribune, who called the a "Must See Work" and gave it 3-and-a-half stars; and Hedy Weiss at the Chicago Sun-Times. The show won a Jeff Award for Best Musical (mid-size production) and for Best Artistic Specialization (Mike Tutaj – Film & Video Design).

His other musicals include Through the Door and The Lost Christmas, the former in concert in the West End in 2009, and both of which were presented in the West End in 2008. The Lost Christmas starred Suranne Jones and Jayne Wisener. The Lost Christmas was produced at the Waterloo East Theatre in London in 2011 and also has been produced by Hazlitt Arts Centre in Kent in the United Kingdom; He wrote Midnight with a book by Tim Knapman and GROWL also book by Tim Knapman (NYMT).

In 2010, West End performer Stuart Matthew Price recorded Wythe's song "Goodnight Kiss" for his debut album All Things in Time for SimG Records. Other songs of his have been performed in concerts and cabarets, most notably "Action Man" from The Lost Christmas, which was performed in the West End at "Christmas in New York", "The Recurring Dream" and also "David's House" which has been most notably performed by Samantha Barks.

In 2012 a production of Roll on the Day played at the Etcetera Theatre in London, directed by Vik Sivalingam, design by Marie Kearney. The book is by Roberto Trippini, music and lyrics by Lawrence Mark Wythe.

It has been suggested that Wythe is perhaps the most talented British composer and lyricist of his generation, and that he is an exciting new voice in British musical theatre which has for some time not produced hit musicals from unknown creatives, i.e. beyond those created by already established names.

== Critical reception ==
In 2010, Lyn Gardner in The Guardian said that much of the score for Tomorrow Morning was "sublime, and sublimely delivered". She gave the show three and a half stars. Time Out London gave the show four stars and made it Critics Choice. Michael Coveny in The Independent had less glowing praise for the show itself, but pointed out Wythe's skill as a composer and lyricist, and his potential for the future. Paul Vale in The Stage called the show "thoughtful and intelligent". Mark Shenton, in the Sunday Express, described the show as "coolly adult, neatly propelled by an earnest song cycle".

Critic Mark Shenton has previously supported the show, and described Wythe as potentially the most talented British musical theatre writer of his generation.

== Tomorrow Morning ==
Tomorrow Morning has now been seen on four continents and has been translated into several languages. The show originated in London in 2006 starring Emma Williams and Stephen Ashfield. The production in New York in 2011 garnered several award nominations for Best Musical and starred Autumn Hurlbert and Matthew Hydzik. The show has been seen in cities including London, NYC, Lisbon, Tokyo, Melbourne, Seoul and other towns in Germany, Austria, Mexico, Italy and beyond. The show has been translated into German, Japanese, Korean, Portuguese, Danish and Italian. Three cast albums are available (USA, UK and German versions.)

== Midnight ==
Commissioned in 2014 by producer Sanan Aly who is of Azerbaijan descent, the show is based on the play Citizens of Hell by Elchin, one of Baku's foremost figures and playwrights. The world premiere production took place in Seoul, Korea in 2016 and the English speaking premiere was at the Union Theatre in London in 2017. The show returned to Seoul repeatedly during 2019-2023, with the original London production being recreated alongside the existing Korean production.

== The Lost Christmas ==
This family musical was presented in the West End in 2008 at the Trafalgar Studios and later at Waterloo East Theatre. The show has seen numerous productions by youth theatre groups, licensed through Broadway Musicals.

== Danni Hero ==
Wythe and Knapman won the commission in May 2015 to write a show for Made in Corby and the show premiered at the Core at Corby Cube in October 2016 as Danny Hero. The story is of a child who mourns the loss of a father and finds comfort in a fantasy world of superheroes... when a malevolent property developer arrives in town, Danni is the only one who can see through his lies and is forced to step up and save the day. The show is licensed through Broadway Musicals.

== Creatives ==
Creatives is a play by Irvine Welsh (creator of Trainspotting) and Don De Grazia, author of American Skin. Laurence wrote songs for the show which played in Chicago in 2016 and at the Edinburgh Festival in 2017.

== Through the Door ==
Through the Door (book by Judy Freed) began life in 2008 when the show was showcased by Perfect Pitch Musicals in London at the Trafalgar Studios in the West End. The show was seen again the following year in a full scale main-house presentation of the show starring Julie Atherton and Paul Keating. In 2011, Wythe and Freed took the show to New York for a workshop with Broadway star Kerry Butler and development workshops in Detroit, Michigan. Since 2014, the show has been in development with Korean producers and the show has seen multiple productions in Korea. Development of the show has seen it under the title Forever Paris in a completely rewritten version.

== GROWL! ==
Growl! is subtitled The True Story of the Big Bad Wolf. This family musical with book and co-lyrics by Tim Knapman premiered in the UK in 2019 with a touring production by the National Youth Music Theatre NYMT directed by Richard Fitch which will play in China in 2020.

== Extraordinary ==
This show was commissioned by Perfect Pitch Musicals for the BBC Children in Need in 2017 and developed at the University of Central Lancashire UCLAN in Preston, England. The premiere studio production was directed by Pip Minnithorpe and choreographed by Ellen Kane. Wythe wrote book, music and lyrics for the show which was featured on Children in Need in November 2017.

== Framed ==
Originally title Girlfriends the show was renamed Framed after some confusion in the industry over an earlier musical by composer Howard Goodall. Framed is a musical romcom which was presented in London in 2011 with a cast including Emma Williams, Michael Xavier, Ashleigh Gray and Gabriel Vick. The show began life as a commission from a Korean producer and after development in 2010 with a bookwriter, the show was taken on as an independent project and rewritten by Wythe and has yet to see a full scale professional production.

== Roll On The Day ==
This show played at the Etcetera Theatre in London in 2012. With a book by Roberto Trippini, the musical was directed by Vik Savilingam which was positively reviewed.

== Making Waves ==
His first professionally produced show Making Waves was a song-cycle of love songs which played at the Fox Theatre in North London in 1995 when Wythe was just 21.
