= Tomorrow Morning (musical) =

British musical

Tomorrow Morning is an off-Broadway musical by Laurence Mark Wythe. In 2022, a film musical adaptation was directed by British director Nick Winston.

The musical was first seen in London in 2006 at the New End Theatre. It was presented at Victory Gardens Greenhouse Theater in Chicago where it won a 2009 Jeff Award for Best Musical. Further productions have been given, including an Off-Broadway production by the York Theatre in 2011 and was seen in Tokyo (2012), Portugal (2014), Seoul (2012–16) plus productions in Germany, Austria, Italy and Australia. Productions in Mexico, Rome and Russia were cancelled or postponed due to the global COVID-19 outbreak and subsequent lockdowns.

The show has been nominated for an Outer Critics Circle Award for Best Musical, among others and has now played on four continents in five languages.

== Plot ==
Two couples are separated by a span of time. Jack and Catherine, who are in their late 30s, are getting divorced. John and Kat, who are in their 20s, are getting married. On the eve of their wedding, Kat reveals to John that she is pregnant. When she informs him, he walks out on her. Catherine and Jack argue about their divorce settlement. Their 10-year-old son disappears, helping the couple to realize that they still care for each other. It turns out that the two couples are the same people: John and Kat are Jack and Catherine's memories of their younger selves. John returns to Kat, and Jack and Catherine reconcile.

== Film adaptation ==
On 25 March 2021, Baz Bamigboye of the Daily Mail announced a feature film adaptation to be released in late 2021 starring Samantha Barks and Ramin Karimloo, directed by Nick Winston.

Unlike in the stage production, the lead actors in the film portrayed themselves at both stages of their lives, a decade apart, with Barks taking on the role of Catherine and her younger counterpart Cat, and Ramin Karimloo playing Bill (formerly known as Jack) and his younger self, Will.

Another difference to the four person stage show was that the film featured other characters, including Catherine's friend and confidante (Fleur East), her mother Joy (Harriet Thorpe), her grandmother Anna (Joan Collins) and a cameo appearance from comic star Omid Djalili as Bill's father Dariush.

== Productions ==
Over the years 2002 to 2006, the musical had development workshops supported by Mercury Musical Developments and West End producer Hilary A. Williams. The show was showcased at Theatre Building Chicago's Stages Festival of New Musicals in 2007.

The show premiered in London in 2006 at the New End Theatre and was later presented at Victory Gardens Greenhouse Theater in Chicago in 2008. Several changes were made when the show moved to Chicago. The song The Time is Coming was replaced by The Pool Guy, Chapter 17 replaced by Self Portrait and the finale Suddenly by All About Today. The plot was also extensively re-written by Laurence Mark Wythe to introduce a pregnancy for the character of Kat. Also, the song Look What We Made was originally sung by the characters of Jack and Catherine, but in Chicago it became a song for the two men, Jack and John, thinking about their son and the son of the future respectively. In later productions since the 2012 Tokyo stage production by Toho Company and in the movie adaptation, this has been reversed and reverted back to the original version.

An Australian production of the show opened in Melbourne on 1 September 2010 at the Treble Clef Jazz Lounge, directed by Joel Baltaha and later transferred to Chapel off Chapel in downtown Melbourne. A London production played at the Landor Theatre in October 2010 starring Julie Atherton and Jon Lee.

An Off-Broadway production began previews at the York Theatre in New York City on 21 March 2011, and officially opened on 30 March, in a limited engagement that closed on 23 April 2011. Directed by Tom Mullen, with choreography by Lorin Latarro, it starred D.B. Bonds, Autumn Hurlbert, Matthew Hydzik and Mary Mossberg. This production was played without an intermission and changes were made to the story. Several songs were removed, and two new songs, What it Takes and The Game Show were added.

== Critical reception ==
The critics were mostly very favorable to the show in Chicago, where Chris Jones of the Chicago Tribune gave the show 3 1/2 stars and ranked it in his top 20 shows of 2008. He also called it "A Must See Work" and said "What Could Be Better Value for Money?" Hedy Weiss at the Chicago Sun Times said it was "Deftly Structured" and "Neatly Observed" though she was slightly more muted in her praise of the show, despite having done a full feature a few weeks earlier. In London the show received good reviews - The Stage called it "A remarkable collaboration of all round talent"; Whats on Stage.com called it "Witty & Poignant". A 2008 production ran at Spirit of Broadway Theatre in Norwich, Connecticut.

The Off-Broadway production received mixed reviews. Backstage praised the writing but commented: "Though smart and pleasant from moment to moment, the show is lukewarm and unoriginal overall." The New York Post similarly wrote that the show "conveys the less-than-revelatory message that marriage can lead to divorce." Talkin' Broadway gave the musical a positive review, calling it "Irresistible".

In 2010, Lyn Gardner in The Guardian said that much of the score for Tomorrow Morning was "sublime, and sublimely delivered". She gave the show three and a half stars. Time Out London gave the show four stars and made it Critics Choice. Michael Coveny in The Independent had less glowing praise for the show itself but pointed out the skill of the composer and lyricist and his potential for the future. Paul Vale in The Stage called the show "thoughtful and intelligent". Mark Shenton, in the Sunday Express described the show as "coolly adult, neatly propelled by an earnest song cycle".

In Australia, Theatrepeople.au wrote: "Due to the delicacy, intelligence and honesty of the writing, it may very well be Tomorrow Morning that goes down in posterity as the preeminent work in this expanding, subgenre of musical theatre".

== Notable casting ==
	Kat (*Cat)	John (*Will)	Catherine	Jack (*Bill)
2021 Screen Adaptation(*)	Samantha Barks	Ramin Karimloo	Samantha Barks	Ramin Karimloo
2006 London	Emma Williams	Stephen Ashfield	Annette McLaughlin	Alastair Robins
2008 Connecticut	Courtney Rioux	Jeremy Jonet	Lisa Foss	Frank Calamaro
2008 Chicago	Emily Thompson	Michael Mahler	Charissa Armon	Jonathan Rayson
2010–2011 Australia	Krystal Shute	Jonathan Guthrie-Jones	Natasha Bassett	Blake Testro
2010 London	Julie Atherton	Jon Lee	Yvette Robinson	Grant Neal
2011 New York City	Autumn Hurlbert	Matt Hydzik	Mary Mossberg	DB Bonds
2014 Kottingbrunn/Austria (first German production)	Anja Haeseli	Oliver Arno	Kathleen Bauer	Martin Pasching

== Recordings ==
The London cast album was released in 2006 on the Dress Circle label. The Chicago production's cast album was released in 2010. Both albums are produced by the composer, though conductor Matt Brind is credited as co-producer on the 2006 album, with Nigel Wright credited as Executive Producer. The first foreign language album was released in November 2015 in a German translation by Daniel Grosse-Boymann on the CoCordis record label in Austria.

The movie soundtrack was released by Sony Masterworks on their Milan Records label, with the album produced by the composer, Theo Buckley, and co-produced, engineered and mixed by London music producer Sam Featherstone, and mastered by Rob Kleiner at Edison Studios in LA.

== Awards ==
- 2009 Jeff Awards, Chicago - Best Musical (midsize) (Winner)
- 2009 Jeff Awards Chicago - Best Artistic Specialization (Winner)
- 2011 Outer Critics Circle Awards - Outstanding New Off Broadway Musical (Nominee)
