= Mamma Mia! I Have a Dream =

British talent television series

- Genre: Reality competition
- Presented by: Zoe Ball
- Judges: Samantha Barks; Alan Carr; Amber Riley; Jessie Ware
- Country of origin: United Kingdom
- Original language: English
- No. of series: 1
- No. of episodes: 8

Production
- Executive producer: Ashley Whitehouse
- Production company: Thames

Original release
- Network: ITV
- Release: 22 October – 10 December 2023

Mamma Mia! I Have a Dream is a British reality talent competition that began airing on 22 October 2023 on ITV. The show documented the search for two new, unknown musical theatre performers to play the roles of Sophie Sheridan and Sky Ramand in the West End production of the musical Mamma Mia!. The series was presented by Zoe Ball, and features Samantha Barks, Alan Carr, Amber Riley and Jessie Ware as judges. The series was won by Stevie Doc and Tobias Turley to play Sophie and Sky respectively.

== Format ==
The series documented the search to find two unknown musical theatre stars to play the central roles of Sophie Sheridan and Sky Ramand in the 2024 West End production of the musical Mamma Mia! for the musical's 25th anniversary. The format was similar to that of the BBC competitions How Do You Solve a Problem like Maria?, Any Dream Will Do, I'd Do Anything and Over the Rainbow which aired on BBC One in 2006, 2007, 2008 and 2010 respectively. ITV later aired a similar programme in 2012, Superstar. The series featured fourteen contestants, seven men and seven women, who took part in masterclasses, challenges and workshops focused on singing, dancing and acting which led to a finale set which took place in a West End theatre where a public vote decided the winners.

== Production ==
In September 2022, it was reported that ITV were planning to revive the musical theatre talent search format with a new series based on Mamma Mia. In December 2022, ITV confirmed the commissioning of Mamma Mia! I Have a Dream. The series was produced by Thames, the production company behind the reality television formats Britain's Got Talent and I Can See Your Voice. The series is filmed in Corfu, Greece and is presented by Zoe Ball. The judges included Samantha Barks, who was a finalist on I'd Do Anything in 2008, comedian Alan Carr, Glee actress Amber Riley and singer Jessie Ware.

== Contestants ==
The fourteen contestants competing for the roles of Sophie and Sky were announced on the day of the show's broadcast.

=== Sophie ===
Name	Age	Hometown	Result
Maddy Erzan-Essien	20	Bolton	Eliminated 1st on 29 October 2023
Maisie Waller	22	Margate	Eliminated 3rd on 12 November 2023
Leah Rutherford	20	Redcar	Eliminated 5th on 19 November 2023
Desmonda Cathabel	27	Jakarta	Eliminated 7th on 26 November 2023
Stephanie Costi	22	St Albans	Third/Eliminated 9th on 3 December 2023
Esme Bowdler	22	Chester	Runner-Up on 10 December 2023
Stevie Doc	22	Glasgow	Winner on 10 December 2023

=== Sky ===
Name	Age	Hometown	Result
Darcy James	23	Hampshire	Eliminated 2nd on 5 November 2023
Callum Ravden	22	Oxfordshire	Eliminated 4th on 12 November 2023
Zackhiel Smith	22	London	Eliminated 6th on 19 November 2023
Marcellus Whyte	36	High Wycombe	Eliminated 8th on 26 November 2023
Craig Watson	26	Perthshire	Third/Eliminated 10th on 3 December 2023
Owen Johnston	25	Belfast	Runner-Up on 10 December 2023
Tobias Turley	23	Somerset	Winner on 10 December 2023

== Weekly summary ==
=== Results summary ===
Colour key

–	Contestant was eliminated
–	Contestant was in the bottom two
–	the Sophie who received the most public votes
–	the Sky who received the most public votes

Weekly results per contestant
Contestant	Week 1	Week 2	Week 3	Week 4	Week 5	Week 6	Week 7	Final
Stevie Doc	SAFE	SAFE	—N/a	SAFE	SAFE	SAFE	SAFE	SOPHIE
Tobias Turley	SAFE	—N/a	SAFE	SAFE	SAFE	SAFE	SAFE	SKY
Esme Bowdler	SAFE	SAFE	—N/a	BTM 2	SAFE	SAFE	SAFE	RUNNER UP
Owen Johnston	SAFE	—N/a	SAFE	SAFE	SAFE	SAFE	SAFE	RUNNER UP
Craig Watson	SAFE	—N/a	SAFE	SAFE	SAFE	SAFE	ELIM	
Stephanie Costi	SAFE	SAFE	—N/a	SAFE	SAFE	SAFE	ELIM	
Marcellus Whyte	SAFE	—N/a	SAFE	SAFE	BTM 2	ELIM		
Desmonda Cathabel	SAFE	SAFE	—N/a	SAFE	BTM 2	ELIM		
Zachkiel Smith	SAFE	—N/a	SAFE	BTM 2	ELIM			
Leah Rutherford	SAFE	SAFE	—N/a	SAFE	ELIM			
Callum Ravden	SAFE	—N/a	SAFE	ELIM				
Maisie Waller	SAFE	SAFE	—N/a	ELIM				
Darcy James	SAFE	—N/a	ELIM					
Maddy Erzan-Essien	SAFE	ELIM						

=== Week 1 (22 October) ===
For the show's the first episode, the fourteen contestants were placed in either duos or trios and performed a song by ABBA.

Group performances:

- "Mamma Mia"
- "I Have a Dream"

Contestants' performances on the first episode
Order	Act	Song	Result
1	Maddy Erzan-Essien	"Money, Money, Money"	Safe
1	Stephanie Costi	"Money, Money, Money"	Safe
2	Craig Watson	"SOS"	Safe
2	Marcellus Whyte	"SOS"	Safe
2	Tobias Turley	"SOS"	Safe
3	Callum Ravden	"Knowing Me, Knowing You"	Safe
3	Darcy James	"Knowing Me, Knowing You"	Safe
4	Esme Bowdler	"Fernando"	Safe
4	Leah Rutherford	"Fernando"	Safe
5	Owen Johnston	"Waterloo"	Safe
5	Zachkiel Smith	"Waterloo"	Safe
6	Desmonda Cathabel	"Chiquitita"	Safe
6	Maisie Waller	"Chiquitita"	Safe
6	Stevie Doc	"Chiquitita"	Safe

=== Week 2 (29 October) ===
In the show's second episode, the Sophies had to demonstrate their acting skills by recreating a scene from the film, before having to perform solo for the first time.

Group performance: "Dancing Queen"

Contestants' performances on the second episode
Order	Act	Song	Result
1	Desmonda Cathabel	"I'll Never Love Again"	Safe
2	Stephanie Costi	"Flashdance... What a Feeling"	Safe
3	Leah Rutherford	"Somebody to Love"	Safe
4	Esme Bowdler	"Just a Girl"	Safe
5	Stevie Doc	"Trustfall"	Safe
6	Maddy Erzan-Essien	"I Say a Little Prayer"	Eliminated
7	Maisie Waller	"I Dreamed a Dream"	Safe

=== Week 3 (5 November) ===
In the show's third episode, the Skys had to demonstrate their acting skills by recreating a scene from the film, before having to perform solo for the first time.

Group performance: "Gimme! Gimme! Gimme! (A Man After Midnight)"

Contestants' performances on the third episode
Order	Act	Song	Result
1	Owen Johnston	"Luck Be a Lady"	Safe
2	Darcy James	"Kiss Me"	Eliminated
3	Zachkiel Smith	"Footloose"	Safe
4	Craig Watson	"Your Song"	Safe
5	Callum Ravden	"Shivers"	Safe
6	Marcellus Whyte	"Can't Take My Eyes Off You"	Safe
7	Tobias Turley	"Pointless"	Safe

=== Week 4 (12 November) ===
For the show's the fourth episode, the Sophies and Skys were paired up and had to recreate a scene between the characters and sing "Lay All Your Love on Me, before performing a duet together.

Group performance:

- "Take a Chance on Me"

Contestants' performances on the first episode
Order	Act	Song	Result
1	Esme Bowdler	"The Power of Love"	Bottom two
1	Marcellus Whyte	"The Power of Love"	Safe
2	Craig Watson	"You're the One That I Want"	Safe
2	Maisie Waller	"You're the One That I Want"	Eliminated
3	Desmonda Cathabel	"Love Is an Open Door"	Safe
3	Tobias Turley	"Love Is an Open Door"	Safe
4	Leah Rutherford	"All for You"	Safe
4	Zachkiel Smith	"All for You"	Bottom two
5	Callum Ravden	"Rewrite the Stars"	Eliminated
5	Stephanie Costi	"Rewrite the Stars"	Safe
6	Owen Johnston	"Shallow"	Safe
6	Stevie Doc	"Shallow"	Safe

=== Week 5 (19 November) ===
For the show's the fifth episode, the Sophies and Skys were sorted into new pairs and had take part in a choreography work shop before performing a dance style in a duet together.

Group performance:

- "Voulez-Vous"

Contestants' performances on the first episode
Order	Act	Song	Dance	Result
1	Stevie Doc	"All That Jazz"	Fosse	Safe
1	Tobias Turley	"All That Jazz"	Fosse	Safe
2	Owen Johnston	"Made You Look"	Commercial	Safe
2	Stephanie Costi	"Made You Look"	Commercial	Safe
3	Desmonda Cathabel	"You Are the Reason"	Waltz	Bottom two
3	Zachkiel Smith	"You Are the Reason"	Waltz	Eliminated
4	Leah Rutherford	"Night Fever"	Disco	Eliminated
4	Marcellus Whyte	"Night Fever"	Disco	Bottom two
5	Craig Watson	"True Colors"	Contemporary	Safe
5	Esme Bowdler	"True Colors"	Contemporary	Safe

=== Week 6 (26 November) ===
For the show's sixth episode, the Sophies had to embark on an acting workshop in which they had to recreate a scene from the film between Sophie and her mother Donna Sheridan, played Mazz Murray, who played the role of Donna in West End production of Mamma Mia!. The Sophies and Skys were again sorted into new pairings and had to perform a new duet.

- Guest performance: Mazz Murray—"The Winner Takes It All"

Contestants' performances on the sixth episode
Order	Act	Song	Result
1	Desmonda Cathabel	"Say Something"	Eliminated
1	Owen Johnston	"Say Something"	Safe
2	Stevie Doc	"The Best"	Safe
2	Craig Watson	"The Best"	Safe
3	Stephanie Costi	"Falling"	Safe
3	Marcellus Whyte	"Falling"	Eliminated
4	Esme Bowdler	"Who Wants to Live Forever"	Safe
4	Tobias Turley	"Who Wants to Live Forever"	Safe

=== Week 7: Semi-final (3 December) ===
In the semi-finals episode, the Sophies and Skys were sorted into new pairings; (Esme & Owen, Craig & Stephanie and Stevie & Tobias) for their final acting workshop in which each pair had to recreate the wedding scene between Sophie and Sky. Each contestant then performed an ABBA song solo, before the finalists were announced.

Group performance: "I Do, I Do, I Do, I Do, I Do"

Contestants' performances on the seventh episode
Order	Act	Song	Result
1	Craig Watson	"Take a Chance on Me"	Eliminated
2	Owen Johnston	"When All Is Said and Done"	Safe
3	Tobias Turley	"Does Your Mother Know"	Safe
4	Stephanie Costi	"Angeleyes"	Eliminated
5	Stevie Doc	"The Name of the Game"	Safe
6	Esme Bowdler	"Dancing Queen"	Safe

=== Week 8: Final (10 December) ===
For the final episode, the show was broadcast live from the Novello Theatre (home of Mamma Mia in the West End) and the Sophies and Skys had to perform one last time in a bid to impress the public, who would vote for who they wanted to win and ultimately play the roles of Sophie and Sky in the West End production of Mamma Mia!.

- Group performance: "Mamma Mia"

Contestants' performances on the eighth and final episode
Order	Act	Song	Result
1	Stevie Doc	"Thank You for the Music"	Sophie
2	Esme Bowdler	"My Love, My Life"	Runner-up
3	Owen Johnston	"Our Last Summer"	Runner-up
4	Tobias Turley	"I've Been Waiting for You"	Sky
5	Stevie, Esme, Owen, and Tobias	"The Winner Takes it All"	N/A

- The Final Vote
  - The final vote was then announced and it was revealed that the winners were Stevie and Tobias with Judy Craymer saying "It's a joyous result and I'm delighted to welcome Stevie and Tobias to join the West End cast in this very special year celebrating Mamma Mia!'s 25th anniversary. All our contestants are so talented and worked so hard, they went through the most intensive musical theatre boot camp with such energy, flair and commitment. They were all such a joy to work with and are all winners in my eyes." Stevie and Tobias then concluded the series with a performance of "Mamma Mia".

== Reception ==
Professional ratings
Review scores
Source	Rating
The Daily Telegraph	4/5 stars
The Independent	4/5 stars
The Guardian	2/5 stars

The series was described by Lucy Mangan of The Guardian as a "wildly rushed, tension-free series that is never less than shrill". She ranked the series 2 out of 5 stars and noted that [the programme] showed "virtually nothing of the workshops and even less of the rehearsals" [...] adding that although the show featured full-length renditions of ABBA's greatest hits and great fun, there was "no tension, no investment, no context for any of [the programme]."

Anita Singh of The Daily Telegraph was more positive in her review of the show's format, describing it as a "talent show with actual talent" and an "all-singing, all-dancing delight, perfect to distract from Britain's gloomy skies". The Independent ranked the series 4 stars, a noted that the show "wonderfully captured [Mamma Mia's] unhinged party atmosphere, whilst Digital Spy observed that viewers had compared the series' contestants to that of Love Island.
