= Nikki Snelson =

American actress

Nikki Snelson (born Nicole Snelson) is an American actress, who works mainly in stage musicals.

== Biography ==
Snelson is originally from St. Louis, Missouri, and received her training at the Boston Conservatory. Snelson’s first major role on Broadway came as Winnie Tate in the 1999 Broadway revival of Annie Get Your Gun (musical), opposite Bernadette Peters. She also appeared on Broadway in the revival of Sweet Charity in 2005, starring Christina Applegate.

She was in a long term relationship with actor Christian Campbell from 2005 to 2007.

In 2007, Snelson originated the role of fitness queen Brooke Wyndam in the world premiere of Legally Blonde: The Musical in San Francisco. She reprised her role in the Broadway production at the Palace Theatre, opening in April 2007. She can be heard on the cast recording of the show, and was also in the MTV live broadcast, as well as the reality casting show Legally Blonde: The Musical – The Search for Elle Woods.

She left the company of Legally Blonde to join the national tour of A Chorus Line as Cassie, starting in May 2008. She had been requested to audition for the role after she had been a finalist for the role of Val in the 2006 Broadway revival, as documented in Every Little Step. She then appeared in 42nd Street at The Muny in St. Louis in June 2009, as Anytime Annie, opposite Robert Cuccioli.

Snelson originated the role of the Mad Hatter in the world premiere of the new Frank Wildhorn musical Wonderland: Alice's New Musical Adventure. The musical had its world premiere on November 24, 2009 (previews) at The David A. Straz Jr. Center for the Performing Arts, Tampa, Florida, and opened at the Alley Theatre, Houston, on January 15, 2010. While the plot of the show was reviewed poorly (though the production good), Snelson received great reviews for her portrayal, which featured her performing difficult choreography (by Marguerite Derricks) while singing “high-energy” Wildhorn tunes. Tampa Bay Online says Snelson “gives a knock-out performance.” Variety added that Snelson played the Hatter “deliciously wicked.” However, before its Broadway production, the musical’s creators altered the role of the Hatter drastically, including excising choreography and sarcastic dialogues, as well as replacing her signature song “Nick of Time,” and decided to replace Snelson. In an interview following this, Snelson said, “it was a wonderful experience for me, and I will forever be heartbroken.”

She took part in a reading of a new musical Sphinx Winx on March 15, 2010, in New York. The musical has music and lyrics by Kenneth Hitchner, Jr. and a book by Phillip Capice, Bob Keuch and Anne Hitchner.

Television and Film

Snelson has appeared in several television shows, including as a guest on Desperate Housewives (2005) and as Chelsea on ABC's All My Children (2004).

Snelson was featured in the documentary Every Little Step and auditioned for the part of Val, but was not cast.

She was offered a role in the CW’s Valentine, but her contract with the Chorus Line national tour forbade her from leaving, as the producers threatened to sue.
