= Little Women (musical) =

2005 musical

- Original Broadway Logo
- Music: Jason Howland
- Lyrics: Mindi Dickstein
- Book: Allan Knee
- Basis: Little Women by Louisa May Alcott
- Productions: 2005 Broadway; 2005 US tour 2008 Sydney; 2017 Manchester; 2021 London; 2024 North American tour

Little Women is a musical with a book by Allan Knee, lyrics by Mindi Dickstein, and music by Jason Howland.

Based on Louisa May Alcott's 1868–69 semi-autobiographical two-volume novel, it focuses on the four March sisters— traditional Meg, wild, aspiring writer Jo, timid Beth and romantic Amy,— and their beloved Marmee, at home in Concord, Massachusetts, while their father is away serving as a Union Army chaplain during the Civil War. Intercut with the vignettes in which their lives unfold are several recreations of the melodramatic short stories Jo writes in her attic studio.

== Productions ==
A workshop production was presented at Duke University in February 2001, directed by Nick Corley. This production followed a workshop reading in March–April 2000. The production next played another workshop at Duke University in October 2004. This version was directed by Susan H. Schulman.

After 55 previews, the Broadway production ran at the August Wilson Theatre from January 23–May 22, 2005, after 137 performances. It was directed by Susan H. Schulman, with choreography by Michael Lichtefeld, scenic design by Derek McLane, costume design by Catherine Zuber, and lighting design by Kenneth Posner.

The Broadway cast featured Sutton Foster as Jo, Maureen McGovern as Marmee/The Hag, Janet Carroll as Aunt March/Mrs. Kirk, Jenny Powers as Meg/Clarissa, Megan McGinnis as Beth/Rodrigo II, Amy McAlexander as Amy/The Troll, Danny Gurwin as Laurie/Rodrigo, Robert Stattel as Mr. Laurence/The Knight, Jim Weitzer as Mr. Brooke/Braxton, and John Hickok as Professor Bhaer.

A 30-city U.S. tour, with McGovern as Marmee, Kate Fisher as Jo, Renee Brna as Meg, Autumn Hurlbert as Beth, and Gwen Hollander as Amy ran from August 2005 (San Diego, California) through July 2006 (Kennedy Center, Washington, DC).

Kookaburra produced the Australian premiere production, which ran at the Seymour Centre in Sydney from November 2008 through December 2008. Opera Australia's Stuart Maunder directed, with music direction by Peter Rutherford. The cast included Kate-Maree Hoolihan as Jo, Trisha Noble as Marmee, Judi Connelli as Aunt March, Erica Lovell as Amy, Octavia Barron-Martin as Meg, Jodie Harris as Beth, Hayden Tee as Professor Bhaer, Stephen Mahy as Laurie, David Harris as John, and Philip Hinton as Mr. Laurence.

The show was first produced in Europe in an Austrian production billed as the European premiere by Theater im Neukloster, Wiener Neustadt, in 2007 using the German title "Beth und ihre Schwestern" ("Beth and her sisters"). The German premiere using the same translation (but with "Betty" in the title) was mounted in 2010 by Waldbühne Kloster Oesede in Georgsmarienhütte. It was brought to the Hope Mill Theatre in Manchester in 2017, led by Amie Giselle-Ward in the role of Jo. Bronagh Lagan directed with music direction from Rickey Long; the production was also billed as the European premiere.

In July 2010, the show made its UK premiere at the Sennheiser Theatre. The cast included Rachel Faith Heath (Jo), Ryan Gibb (Laurie), and Magnus Warness (Professor Bhaer). The show was directed by Emma Higginbottom and music directed by David Williams.

The musical made its Off West End premiere at the Park Theatre from November through December 2021.

A Dutch production ran during the winter of 2023 in the DeLaMar West theater in Amsterdam (a secondary location of the DeLaMar theater). It featured Michelle van de Ven as Jo, Lisanne Veeneman as Beth, Natalie Salek as Meg, Sem Gerritsma as Amy, Céline Purcell as Marmee, and Wim van den Driessche as Mr. Laurence.

In September 2023, a production of Little Women premiered in Buenos Aires' Paseo La Plaza, starring Macarena Giraldez as Jo. It was the first official production of the musical in Spanish.

== Plot ==
=== Act I ===
In 1865, Josephine March (Jo) receives a notice of rejection from a publisher; it is her twenty-second rejection. Jo asks Professor Bhaer, another boarder at Mrs. Kirk's boarding house, his opinion on her story ("An Operatic Tragedy"). The professor is not impressed by her story, telling her that he thinks that she can write something better. Jo, taken aback and angry at Bhaer's reaction, asks him what he knows to give him the right to criticize her and insults him by calling him old. He reacts by saying that he is stating his opinion and leaves. Jo, left alone, wonders what could be better than the story she has written, then muses that perhaps her writing was better when she was at home in Concord, Massachusetts ("Better").

Two years earlier in her attic studio, Jo assembles her sisters, Meg, Beth, and Amy, to tell them that she will be putting on a show of her own called the "Operatic Tragedy". The sisters beg Jo to not make the show but Jo convinces them that this play will be a hit and will make for the best Christmas ever ("Our Finest Dreams"). Marmee, their mother, comes in with a letter from their father, who is away as a Union army chaplain in the American Civil War. As Marmee writes a response, she reflects on how hard it is to be the pillar of strength in the March home ("Here Alone").

Aunt March, the sisters' wealthy aunt, asks Jo to change from being a tomboy to a model lady of society. She tells Jo she is considering bringing her along to Europe. Jo begs to go with her, but Aunt March says that she will take her only if she changes. Jo, who has always dreamed of seeing Europe, agrees ("Could You?"). Meanwhile, Meg has one of her own dreams realized: she and Jo are invited to Annie Moffat's Valentine's Day Ball. On the day of the ball, while the two sisters are getting ready, Meg decides that she cannot go. She asks Marmee what she should say when one of her potential suitors asks her to dance. Marmee tells Meg to just smile and say "I'd be delighted" ("Delighted"). Amy, who cares about society life more than Jo, rushes down in Jo's old ball gown to join them in going to the ball, but Jo stops her as she is not invited. Spiteful, Amy burns Jo's manuscript in the fireplace.

At the ball, Jo accidentally sits on Laurie, who is a neighbor of the Marches' along with his grumpy grandfather, Mr. Laurence. Laurie's tutor, Mr. Brooke, comes in and scolds Laurie for not meeting important people, which will make Mr. Laurence angry. Mr. Brooke accidentally takes Meg's dance card; when he returns it, he sees how beautiful she is, asks her to dance, and Meg agrees. Meg and Mr. Brooke are smitten with each other at first sight. Laurie confesses to Jo his need for friends and asks Jo to dance with him. Jo replies that she doesn't dance but Laurie keeps trying ("Take A Chance On Me").

Back at the Marches' after the ball, Jo and Amy have a confrontation after Jo discovers what Amy has done to her manuscript. Marmee sends Amy to bed and apologizes to Jo, but tells her that Amy is just a child and wants to be like Jo. Jo rushes up to the attic to rewrite her story ("Better (Reprise)"). Laurie invites Jo to a skating race, which she at first refuses but eventually agrees to. Amy wants to go with them but has already outgrown her skates. Beth, who intends to stay home, offers Amy her old skates.

Beth is sitting at the family's old piano when Mr. Laurence comes in looking for Laurie. Mr. Laurence discovers Beth's talent at the piano and they sing a duet ("Off to Massachusetts"). Jo and Laurie come in from the skating race with Laurie carrying Amy because she fell through the ice while skating. Jo and Amy reconcile, and Jo makes Laurie an honorary member of the March family ("Five Forever").

Marmee receives a letter informing her that her husband has contracted pneumonia and she must go to Washington to be with him. As Marmee prepares to leave and Amy packs her things to stay with Aunt March, Jo returns with money for Marmee to travel, but confesses that she did not go to Aunt March; she tried to sell her stories in the town common, but ended up cutting and selling her hair. When Aunt March arrives to pick up Amy, she sees Jo and is furious. Jo has a confrontation with Aunt March, ending with Aunt March deciding not to take Jo to Europe after all. Aunt March then turns her focus to Amy, intending to mold her into the society life that she envisioned for Jo. Mr. Brooke tells Meg of his enlistment in the Union army. He then asks Meg for her hand in marriage, and she accepts ("More Than I Am").

Months later, Laurie returns to Concord and visits Jo, who is happy to see him. Laurie tells her that his grandfather has enrolled him in college and that he will be leaving in time for the summer session. Laurie begins to confess his feelings for Jo and kisses her ("Take A Chance On Me (Reprise)"). He put out a ring and tells Jo he loves her. Jo does not accept his marriage proposal and is upset by his words. He tells her that she will marry eventually, but Jo tells him that she will not; Laurie says she will, but not to him. Jo ponders her future, vowing to find another way to achieve her dreams ("Astonishing").

=== Act II ===
At Mrs. Kirk's boarding house in New York City, she is holding a telegram for Jo from Mrs. March. Jo runs in, looking for Professor Bhaer and finding him right in front of her. She has news of her first sale as an author ("The Weekly Volcano Press"). She tells them the story of the sale as well; following Professor Bhaer's advice, she embellished the story. When Jo reads the telegram, she is notified that Beth contracted scarlet fever and immediately packs her bags to return to Concord.

Jo, after a few days, sends a letter to Professor Bhaer, asking him what's new in New York. The professor struggles to write a decent response ("How I Am"). With her new earnings, Jo takes Marmee and Beth to Cape Cod. When Marmee leaves to write to her husband, Beth and Jo put together a kite that Jo got for Beth and they fly it in the air. Beth tells Jo that she is not afraid to die, but says that the hardest part is leaving Jo ("Some Things Are Meant To Be"). Beth dies soon after.

Amy and Aunt March return home from Europe. Laurie also returns home from Europe and sees Jo for the first time in a long time. Jo tells Laurie that she has missed him and that she sold a story; Laurie tells her that she was always meant to "fly on golden wings," and that he was not. Amy comes to them and Amy and Laurie struggle to tell Jo of their impending marriage because they do not wish for Jo to be upset ("The Most Amazing Thing").

Jo, grieving Beth's death, finds herself unable to write another story. Marmee tells Jo of how she copes with Beth's death, telling Jo that she must move forward for Beth's sake ("Days of Plenty"). Jo reminisces about her sisters. Her thoughts of her family and friends inspire her to write her novel, "Little Women" ("The Fire Within Me").

On the day of Laurie and Amy's wedding, Professor Bhaer comes to Concord to see Jo and she is surprised to see him. He tells Jo of his feelings for her ("Small Umbrella In The Rain"). He proposes to her and Jo accepts his proposal. He tells Jo that he sent the manuscript of her novel to Henry Dashwood, the editor of The Weekly Volcano Press. He tells Jo that the publisher agreed to publish it, and Jo proclaims her happiness. As Marmee comes outside and brings Professor Bhaer in, Jo takes a moment to reflect on her life ("Volcano (Reprise)"). Professor Bhaer then comes back out and tells Jo they're all waiting for her inside. Jo goes to Bhaer, takes his hand, and goes inside the house.

== Characters ==
Character	Vocal range	Description
Jo March	mezzo-soprano E3–A5	The second-eldest of the four sisters, Jo is a passionate and determined young author struggling to find her place in the world. Independent and fiery, she rejects Laurie's proposal before eventually becoming engaged to Professor Bhaer.
Marmee March	mezzo-soprano Eb3–Eb5	Marmee is the mother of the March sisters the strong backbone of the March family. She only reveals her true fears and pain when she sings.
Beth March	soprano A3–G5	The timid and musical second-youngest of the sisters, Beth encourages and helps her sisters selflessly. She forms an unlikely friendship with Mr. Laurence but dies of scarlet fever in Act II.
Margaret "Meg" March	soprano Bb3–Bb5	The eldest and most traditional of the sisters, Meg is prim and proper but also romantic and sweet-natured. She marries and has twins with John Brooke.
Amy March	soprano B3–F#5	The youngest sister who yearns for a sophisticated life, Amy is the baby of the family and is used to getting her own way. Ladylike and elegant, she eventually marries Laurie.
Theodore "Laurie" Laurence	tenor Bb2–Bb4	Laurie is the lonely and charming neighbor boy who becomes firm friends with the March family. He proposes to Jo but eventually falls in love with and marries Amy.
Professor Fritz Bhaer	baritone G2–F#4	Professor Bhaer is a sensible German professor boarding with Mrs. Kirk. He persuades Jo that she can write better material, eventually falling in love with and getting engaged to her.
Aunt March	mezzo-soprano Eb3–F#5	Aunt March is the formidable and haughty great-aunt of the March sisters. Exasperated by Jo's lack of propriety, she decides to take Amy to Europe.
Mr. John Brooke	baritenor C#3–G4	Mr. Brooke is Laurie's tutor. A reserved and hard-working young man, he only shows his tender side when he falls in love with Meg.
Mr. Laurence	baritone C#3–E4	Mr. Laurence is Laurie's grandfather, a stiff and stern elderly man who eventually shows his softer side to Beth and gives her his beloved piano that belonged to his dead daughter.
Mrs. Kirk	mezzo-soprano Eb3–F#5	Mrs. Kirk is the Irish owner of the boarding-house in which Professor Bhaer and Jo meet.

Doubling of roles

The show was written to be performed by a cast of ten who play 18 individual roles.

Women:

- 1 – Jo
- 2 – Marmee, Hag
- 3 – Beth, Rodrigo II
- 4 – Meg, Clarissa
- 5 – Amy, Troll
- 6 – Aunt March, Mrs. Kirk

Men:

- 1 – Professor Bhaer
- 2 – Laurie, Rodrigo
- 3 – Mr. John Brooke, Sir Braxton Prendergast
- 4 – Mr. Laurence, The Knight

In the Operatic Tragedy

Character	Description	Doubled with (in the original production)
Clarissa	A sweet young woman fleeing Sir Braxton Prendergast. The heroine of Jo's operatic tragedy.	Meg
Rodrigo	The determined and brave hero of Jo's operatic tragedy.	Laurie
Sir Braxton Prendergast	An evil villain ruthlessly pursuing Clarissa.	Mr. Brooke
The Hag	A mysterious creature who shows Clarissa the way through the forest in return for her combs.	Marmee
The Troll	A greedy monster who takes Clarissa across wild rapids in return for her necklace.	Amy
The Knight	A tired and lonely old man who gives Clarissa his sword as a reward for her kindness.	Mr. Laurence
Rodrigo II	The real hero of Jo's operatic tragedy and Clarissa's long lost sister.	Beth

Optional Chorus

The script and score include notations for the addition of a chorus to include:

- Dancers at the ball
- Ice-skaters
- Chorus of Hags
- Chorus of Trolls
- Chorus of Monks
- Beachcombers

== Musical numbers ==
Act I

- Overture
- "An Operatic Tragedy" – Jo, Clarissa, Braxton and Rodrigo
- "Better" – Jo
- "Our Finest Dreams" – Jo, Beth, Amy and Meg
- "Here Alone" – Marmee
- "Could You?" – Aunt March and Jo
- "Delighted" – Marmee, Meg, Beth and Jo
- "Take a Chance on Me" – Laurie
- "Better (Reprise)" – Jo
- "Off to Massachusetts" – Beth and Mr. Laurence
- "Five Forever" – Jo, Beth, Meg, Amy and Laurie
- "More Than I Am" – Mr. Brooke and Meg
- "Take a Chance on Me (Reprise)" – Laurie
- "Astonishing" – Jo

Act II

- "The Weekly Volcano Press" – Jo, Professor Bhaer, Mrs. Kirk, Clarissa, Braxton, Rodrigo, Hag, Troll, Knight and Rodrigo II
- "Off to Massachusetts (Reprise)" – Mr. Laurence, Beth, Jo, Marmee, Meg and Mr. Brooke
- "How I Am" – Professor Bhaer
- "Some Things Are Meant to Be" – Beth and Jo
- "The Most Amazing Thing" – Amy and Laurie
- "Days of Plenty" – Marmee
- "The Fire Within Me" – Jo
- "Small Umbrella in the Rain" – Jo and Professor Bhaer
- "Sometimes When You Dream (Reprise)" – Jo

"Better (Reprise)", "Take A Chance on Me (Reprise)", and "Off to Massachusetts (Reprise)" are excluded from the cast recording.

== Cast and characters ==
Character	Industry reading (2000)	Duke University workshop (2001)	Duke University workshop (2004)	Broadway (2005)	US tour (2005)	Off West End (2021)	North American tour (2024)
Jo	Kerry O'Malley	Kerry O'Malley	Sutton Foster	Sutton Foster	Kate Fisher	Lydia White	Hannah Taylor
Marmee/The Hag	Jan Maxwell	Mary Gordon Murray	Maureen McGovern	Maureen McGovern	Maureen McGovern	Savannah Stevenson	Aaron Bower
Beth/Rodrigo II	Megan McGinnis	Megan McGinnis	Megan McGinnis	Megan McGinnis	Autumn Hurlbert	Anastasia Martin	Camryn Hamm
Meg/Clarissa	Becky Watson	Rachel Hardin	Amy Rutberg	Jenny Powers	Renee Brna	Hana Ichijo	Rachel Pantazis
Laurie/Rodrigo	Joe Machota	Joe Machota	Danny Gurwin	Danny Gurwin	Stephen Patterson	Sev Keoshgerian	Aathaven Tharmarajah
Amy/The Troll	Jenn Gambatese	Catherine Brunnel	Amy McAlexander	Amy McAlexander	Gwen Hollander	Mary Moore	Noa Harris
Professor Bhaer	John Dossett	Allen Fitzpatrick	John Hickok	John Hickok	Andrew Varela	Ryan Bennett	Mychal Leverage
Aunt March/Mrs. Kirk	Jane Connell	Rita Gardner	Janet Carroll	Janet Carroll	Louisa Flaningam	Bernadine Pritchett	Moriel Behar
Mr. John Brooke/Braxton	Robert Bartley	Robert Bartley	Jim Weitzer	Jim Weitzer	Michael Minarik	Lejaun Sheppard	Aaron Robinson
Mr. Laurence/The Knight	Robert Stattel	Robert Stattel	Robert Stattel	Robert Stattel	Robert Stattel	Brian Protheroe	Chris Carsten

== Reception ==
Reception for the musical was mixed to positive, with praise being aimed at Sutton Foster's performance and the musical's score, and criticism for the book and overall pacing of the production.

Ben Brantley, reviewing for The New York Times, wrote: "You glean the most salient traits of the principal characters, events and moral lessons, but without the shading and detail that made these elements feel true to life in the book [...] Since the characters do not acquire full personalities, you don't feel emotionally invested in them." He wrote of Sutton Foster: "If 'Little Women' does develop the following of young girls and their mothers the producers have targeted, it will be largely Ms. Foster's doing."

The Village Voice's review noted that "the often charming family scenes are dwarfed by the high proscenium arch [...] Allan Knee's script offers long passages of astutely condensed Alcott; Jason Howland's pleasant music, inventively orchestrated by Kim Scharnberg, pulls contemporary shapes out of period waltzes, polkas, and quadrilles, bumpily but gamely supported by Mindi Dickstein's uneven lyrics. And the cast, as always, offers many potential rescuers."

== Awards and nominations ==
=== Original Broadway production ===
Year	Award ceremony	Category	Nominee	Result
2005	Tony Awards	Best Actress in a Musical	Sutton Foster	Nominated
2005	Outer Critics Circle Awards	Outstanding Actress in a Musical	Sutton Foster	Nominated
2005	Drama Desk Award	Outstanding Actress in a Musical	Sutton Foster	Nominated
2005	Drama Desk Award	Outstanding Featured Actress in a Musical	Maureen McGovern	Nominated
2005	Drama Desk Award	Outstanding Orchestrations	Kim Scharnberg	Nominated
