= Autumn Hurlbert =

American actress, singer, and dancer (born 1980)

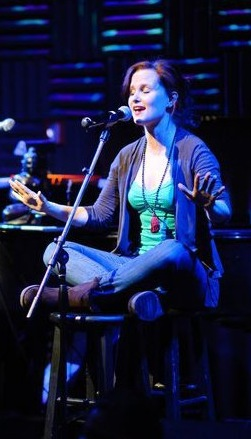
- Hurlbert at Joe's Pub in 2010
- Born: Autumn Marie Hurlbert; Great Falls, Montana
- Education: University of Northern Colorado
- Occupations: Actress, singer, dancer
- Spouse: Tim Norman (2011–present)

Autumn Marie Hurlbert (born 6 March 1980) is an American actress, singer, and dancer. Hurlbert is best known as the runner-up on the reality competition series Legally Blonde: The Musical – The Search for Elle Woods. After taping the competition, Hurlbert served as a member of the Broadway cast in Legally Blonde: The Musical until its closing on Oct 19, 2008. She also understudied the parts of Elle and Margot on Broadway. Ultimately, Hurlbert did headline as Elle Woods in an October 2012 version of the production, directed by Denis Jones in North Carolina.

== Career ==
Hurlbert grew up in Mesa, Arizona and attended the University of Northern Colorado.

Hurlbert's credits include the first national tour of the musical Little Women and numerous regional and touring credits, including: Belle in Beauty & the Beast, Eponine in Les Miserablés, and Perón's Mistress in Evita. In 2009, Hurlbert was awarded the FringeNYC Overall Excellence Award for Outstanding Actor for originating the role of Abby Lawrence in the comedy A Contemporary American's Guide to a Successful Marriage, 1959.

Hurlbert starred as Rachel Hughes in the 2010 film Sudden Death!, written and directed by Adam Hall as his Masters thesis.

In November 2010, Hurlbert appeared with Phylicia Rashad in Marcus Gardley's new play every tongue confess, directed by Kenny Leon at the Arena Stage in Washington, D.C. Hurlbert received critical acclaim for originating the role of Benny Pride. Hilton Als of The New Yorker characterized her performance as "phenomenal."

Hurlbert made her Off-Broadway debut in 2011, starring in the Outer Critics Circle Award-nominated musical Tomorrow Morning at the York Theatre. Tomorrow Morning, with book, music, and lyrics by Laurence Mark Wythe, is a new musical about two couples.

In 2012, Hurlbert starred as Sybil in Noël Coward's Private Lives at the Huntington Theater in Boston, directed by Maria Aitken. This production was slated to return to the stage in 2014 at the Shakespeare Theatre Company, in Washington, D.C. Also in 2012, Hurlbert starred as Elle Woods in Legally Blonde: The Musical at the North Carolina Theatre.

She teamed up again with Hall in 2013 as a scientist named Taylor in the web-series Research, alongside Barry Bostwick and Doug Jones.

Hurlbert played Samantha in the Off-Broadway musical Nobody Loves You at Second Stage Theatre in 2013.

Hurlbert appeared in NBC's The Sound of Music Live! TV special on December 5, 2013, as Dancer #11.

In Spring 2014, Hurlbert reprised her role as Sybil in Private Lives, again under the direction of Maria Aiken. This production played at the Lansburg Theatre of the Shakespeare Theatre Company in Washington, D.C.

Hurlbert starred Off-Broadway in It's Only Kickball, Stupid, directed by Adam Fitzgerald in 2014.

She began performances as Portia in the US National Tour of Something Rotten!, starting on January 10, 2017.
