= Mindi Dickstein =

American lyricist and librettist

- Origin: New York University
- Genres: Musical theatre
- Occupations: Lyricist, Librettist
- Years active: 1993 - present

Mindi Dickstein is an American lyricist and librettist.

Dickstein wrote the lyrics for the 2005 Broadway musical production Little Women, based on the 1868 novel of the same name by Louisa May Alcott. It began previews at The Virginia Theater (now The August Wilson Theater) on December 7, 2004, opened on January 23, 2005 and ran for 137 performances, closing on May 22, 2005. The production received Tony and Drama Desk nominations, including a Best Actress nomination for Sutton Foster, who played Jo March. Licensed by Music Theater International, Little Women has been produced continuously in the U.S. and Canada since its Broadway run, and has had worldwide productions from Australia to London to Tokyo. The Official Broadway Cast Album (recorded by Sh-k-boom/Ghostlight Records) is available on Amazon and other music retailing and streaming sites.

Other notable work includes the book for Toy Story: The Musical for Disney Creative Entertainment, with a score by Groovelily; and lyrics for songs, written with composer Carmel Dean, for the musical Witnesses. Based on the diaries of teens written during the Holocaust, Witnesses is a group show with a book by Robert L. Freedman and songs by several songwriters including, in addition to Dickstein and Dean, Anna K. Jacobs, Matthew Gould, and Adam Gwon. Witnesses had its world premiere at the California Center for the Arts, Escondido in July 2022, and was voted Outstanding New Production of 2022 by the San Diego Theatre Critics Circle.

She also wrote lyrics for Benny & Joon, a new musical based on the MGM film of the same name with music by Nolan Gasser and libretto by Kirsten Guenther. Benny & Joon had its world premiere in 2017 at The Old Globe in San Diego, California -- where it was nominated as Outstanding New Musical by the San Diego Theatre Critics Circle. It then had its east coast premiere in 2019 at the Paper Mill Playhouse in Millburn, New Jersey. Benny & Joon was developed at Rhinebeck Writers Retreat, Theatreworks Silicon Valley, the 2016 National Alliance for Musical Theatre (NAMT) Festival in New York, and the Goodspeed Johnny Mercer Colony, among others.

Since 1996, Dickstein has taught at New York University's Tisch School of the Arts in the graduate musical theatre program. In 2001, Dickstein received the Jonathan Larson Grant. Her songs have been performed at Lincoln Center's "Here And Now: Contemporary Lyricists" and at The Dramatist Guild Fund's "Great Writers Thank Their Lucky Stars." She is the recipient of Playwrighting Fellowships from the Massachusetts Artists Foundation and the New York Foundation for the Arts.

A graduate of Brookline High School in Massachusetts, Dickstein received her Master of Fine Arts in Musical Theater Writing from New York University in 1993. She was an Oscar Hammerstein Fellow there.
