= Diablo Theatre Company =

Diablo Theatre Company, formerly known as Diablo Light Opera Company, is a non-profit theatre and arts organization based in Walnut Creek, California, in the San Francisco Bay Area. Founded in 1959 by a group of local theater enthusiasts, it has evolved over its many years, from its inception as a small theatre group, to a million dollar regional theatre company, to its current iteration as a sponsor of youth and young adult theatre education, through its SingOut! Musical Theatre for Bay Area Children and Young Adults program.

During DTC's years as a mainstage theatre company, it produced large-scale musicals each year in Walnut Creek, California, in the Del Valle Theater, and in the Hofmann Theatre at Dean Lesher Regional Center for the Arts. During that time, DTC was a regional theater company with Actors' Equity Association Guest Artist Contracts. Operations and programs were housed for many years in the "Fire House" in Pleasant Hill, California.

Diablo Theatre Company's youth program, "SingOut! Musical Theatre for Bay Area Children and Young Adults" is a theatre program that provides education in all things musical theatre, including voice, dance, and acting. Originally known as the Youth Theatre Company of Walnut Creek, SingOut!, is headed by Chelsea Bardellini (artistic director), Kevin Weinert (musical director) and Rachel Pergamit (managing director). Diablo Theatre Company partnered with SingOut! in 2015. It produces roughly ten musicals per year, and is home to more than 300 young performers aged 4 to 18.

SingOut! youth competition teams compete annually in the Musical Theatre Competitions of America and the Junior Theatre Festival.

The company's productions range from classic musicals such as The Music Man and My Fair Lady, to more modern musicals such as Annie, The Lion King, Little Shop of Horrors, Come From Away and Into the Woods.
