= Elchin =

Elchin (Azerbaijani: Elçin) is a masculine Azerbaijani given name. Notable people with the name include:

- Elchin Afandiyev (1943–2025), Azerbaijani writer and politician
- Elchin Alizade (born 1986), Azerbaijani boxer
- Elchin Azizov (born 1975), Azerbaijani opera singer
- Elchin Guliyev (born 1967), Azerbaijani politician
- Elchin Ismayilov (born 1982), Azerbaijani judoka
- Elchin Musaoglu (born 1966), Azerbaijani film director
- Elçin Sangu (born 1985), Turkish actress and model
