= Stephen Ashfield =

British actor and singer

Stephen Ashfield is an Olivier Award-winning Scottish actor. He was born in Glasgow, Scotland, and since graduating from the Royal Scottish Academy of Music and Drama and the Royal Academy of Music in London, he has enjoyed a successful stage career. In 2011 he was made an Associate (ARAM) of the Royal Academy of Music and was awarded a Fellowship (FRAM) in the 2018 honours list.

== On stage ==
Ashfield made his West End debut in 2002 as Boy George in Taboo, before playing the role of Basilio in the critically acclaimed Music Theatre London adaptation of Mozart's The Marriage of Figaro at the Drill Hall, London.

In 2004, Ashfield returned to the role of Boy George for the first national tour of the award-winning musical Taboo. Subsequently, he appeared in the title role of Harry in the West End showcase of When Harry Met Barry, and created the leading role, George, in The Ha'penny Bridge at The Point, Dublin.

Ashfield was soon back in the West End as Nick Piazza in Fame, before appearing as John in the brand new musical Tomorrow Morning by Laurence Mark Wythe at London's New End Theatre. His passion for new musical theatre writing led him to create the role of Adam in Imagine This at the Theatre Royal, Plymouth.

Having started in March 2008, Ashfield originated the role of Bob Gaudio in the West End production of Jersey Boys at the Prince Edward Theatre, with his final performance taking place on Sunday 13 March 2011. For his performance, he won Best Supporting Actor in a Musical at the WhatsOnStage Theatregoers' Choice Awards 2009.

In March 2011, Ashfield made his cabaret debut at Lauderdale House, Highgate, before taking over the role of Emmett Forrest in the West End production of Legally Blonde until its closure in April 2012.

In November and December 2012, Ashfield starred in the limited-run UK premiere of Boy Meets Boy at the Jermyn Street Theatre before taking on the role of Elder McKinley in the Broadway transfer The Book of Mormon, which opened at the Prince of Wales Theatre on 25 February 2013. He was awarded an Olivier Award for his performance. He concluded his West End run on 5 August 2016 to continue his award-winning performance as Elder McKinley at the Eugene O'Neill Theatre on Broadway.

In 2019, Ashfield originated the role of Hamish McClarnon in the world premiere of the musical adaptation of Becoming Nancy. The production played at the Coca-Cola Stage at the Alliance Theatre, which is part of the Atlanta Theatre Company, from September 6 to October 6, 2019. He reprised the role in the UK premiere at the Birmingham Repertory Theatre from October 2 to November 2, 2024.

== On screen ==
In 2007 Ashfield appeared in Sweeney Todd directed by Tim Burton for Warner Bros. He has also performed with Jersey Boys on Strictly Come Dancing, GMTV, This Morning, Alan Titchmarsh, The Paul O'Grady Show, Loose Women, Children In Need, and The 80th Royal Variety Performance.

In March 2014 Ashfieldce appeared in the season 3 finale of Call the Midwife as Philip Worth.

== Awards and nominations ==
Year	Award	Title	Result
2009	WhatsOnStage Award - Best Supporting Actor in a Musical	Jersey Boys	Won
2014	WhatsOnStage Award - Best Supporting Actor in a Musical	The Book of Mormon	Won
2014	Laurence Olivier Award - Best Performance in a Supporting Role in a Musical	The Book of Mormon	Won
