= Nicki Minaj–Cardi B feud =

Rap Feud. Nicki Minaj Vs Cardi B

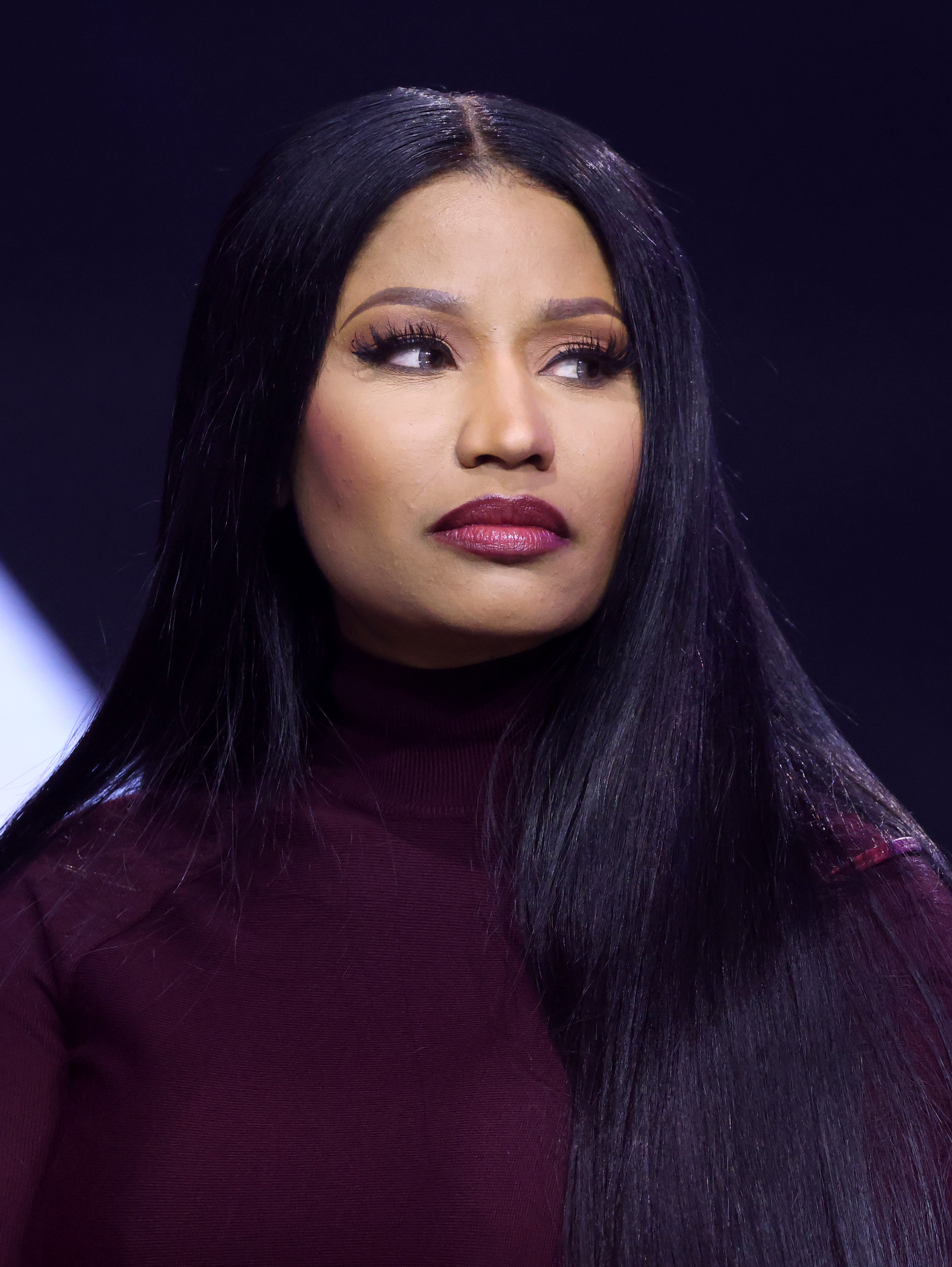
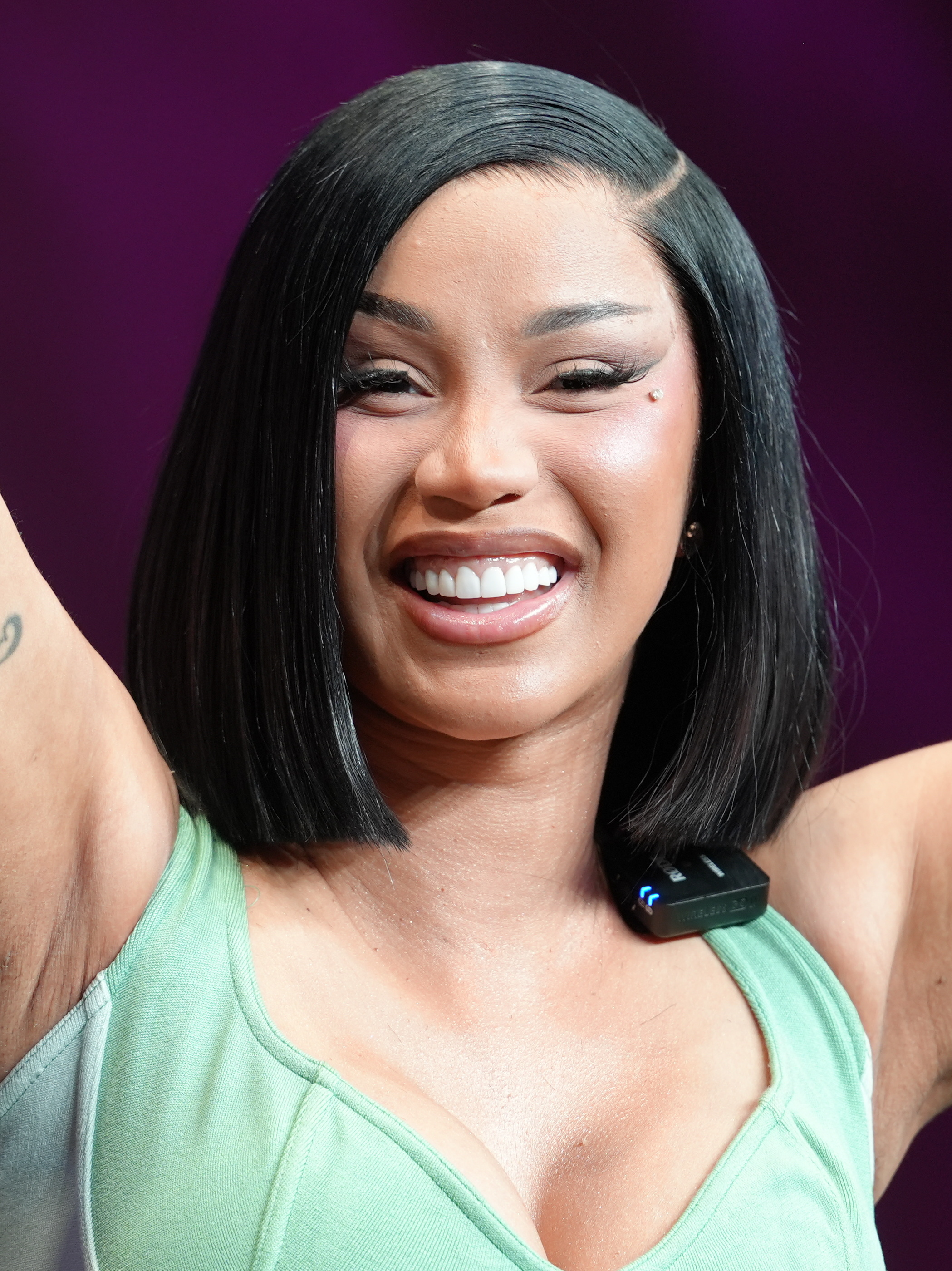
- Nicki Minaj in 2025 Cardi B in 2026
- Date: c. mid-2017–present
- Medium: Social media, attempted fight
- Status: Ongoing

Parties
Nicki Minaj; Rah Ali	Cardi B; Hennessy Carolina

Trinidadian rapper Nicki Minaj and American rapper Cardi B have been involved in a highly publicized feud since around 2017.

As Cardi B's song "Bodak Yellow" rose to popularity in 2017, rumors of a feud between her and Minaj began circulating. Both rappers' guest verses on songs released that year were alleged to be disses toward one another, which they both denied. They were both featured on the 2017 Migos song "MotorSport"; the two appearing separately in its music video and interviews about Minaj's verse on the song furthered discussions of a feud between them. In September 2018, Cardi B attempted to physically attack Minaj at a New York Fashion Week party, which left Cardi B with a welt on her head and attracted widespread media attention. Cardi B attributed it to Minaj "liking" a comment mocking Cardi B's parenting skills soon after giving birth to her daughter Kulture, which Minaj denied.

Following the release of Cardi B's second studio album Am I the Drama? (2025), the feud was re-ignited when Minaj tweeted insults toward Cardi B regarding her pregnancy and her album sales. This led to a 3-day long back-and-forth between them, during which both rappers made derisive remarks about one another's children, including Minaj calling Kulture ugly and Cardi B calling Minaj's son "slow" and "non-verbal"; the two made numerous accusations about each other's families, drug use, and mental health.

Since 2018, commentators and other public figures have denounced the feud as disappointing and unnecessary and criticized both rappers for their role in the feud, with some singling out Minaj for her role in it.

== History ==
=== 2017–2018: "MotorSport" and attempted New York Fashion Week fight ===
==== Origins and alleged sneak disses ====
Rumors of a feud between Nicki Minaj and Cardi B began to circulate online in March 2017, when the Twitter account Pop Crave shared a screenshot from an Instagram comment calling a freestyle by Cardi B "dumb ass bars". Minaj soon liked a tweet from a fan, who wrote that the screenshot had been faked. During Minaj's feud with fellow rapper Remy Ma and following the release of Ma's song "Shether", a diss track against Minaj, Cardi B performed the song "U.N.I.T.Y." with Ma during her June 2017 performance at Summer Jam. Minaj's verse on the 2017 London on da Track song "No Flag", which was released two months later and on which she rapped, "Lil' bitch, I heard these labels tryna make another me/Everything you getting, little hoe, is cause of me", fueled further rumors of a feud between Minaj and Cardi B. Minaj tweeted that she had written her verse two months prior to the song's release and denied that it was in response to Cardi B's performance with Ma.

Cardi B's feature on the G-Eazy song "No Limit", released later that year, featured the verse "Can you stop with all the subs?/Bitch, I ain't Jared," which was assumed to be directed at Minaj. She stated in an interview with the radio show The Breakfast Club that the verse was directed at women from her old neighborhood rather than toward Minaj, whom she had previously spoken with. Minaj's fans also accused Cardi B of copying Minaj's style and demeanor in the song's music video, released in December of that year. Minaj soon tweeted, "I'm glad y'all peeped," which both BuzzFeed News and Atlanta Black Star wrote seemed to be in agreement with the assessment.

Cardi B's song "Bodak Yellow" topped the Billboard Hot 100 in September 2017, making Cardi B the first solo female rapper to peak at number one on the chart since Lauryn Hill in 1998. Minaj soon posted a congratulatory tweet addressed to Cardi B, calling it "a RECORD BREAKING achievement", which Cardi B responded to by thanking her and writing that it "means sooo much coming from you".

==== "MotorSport" contentions ====
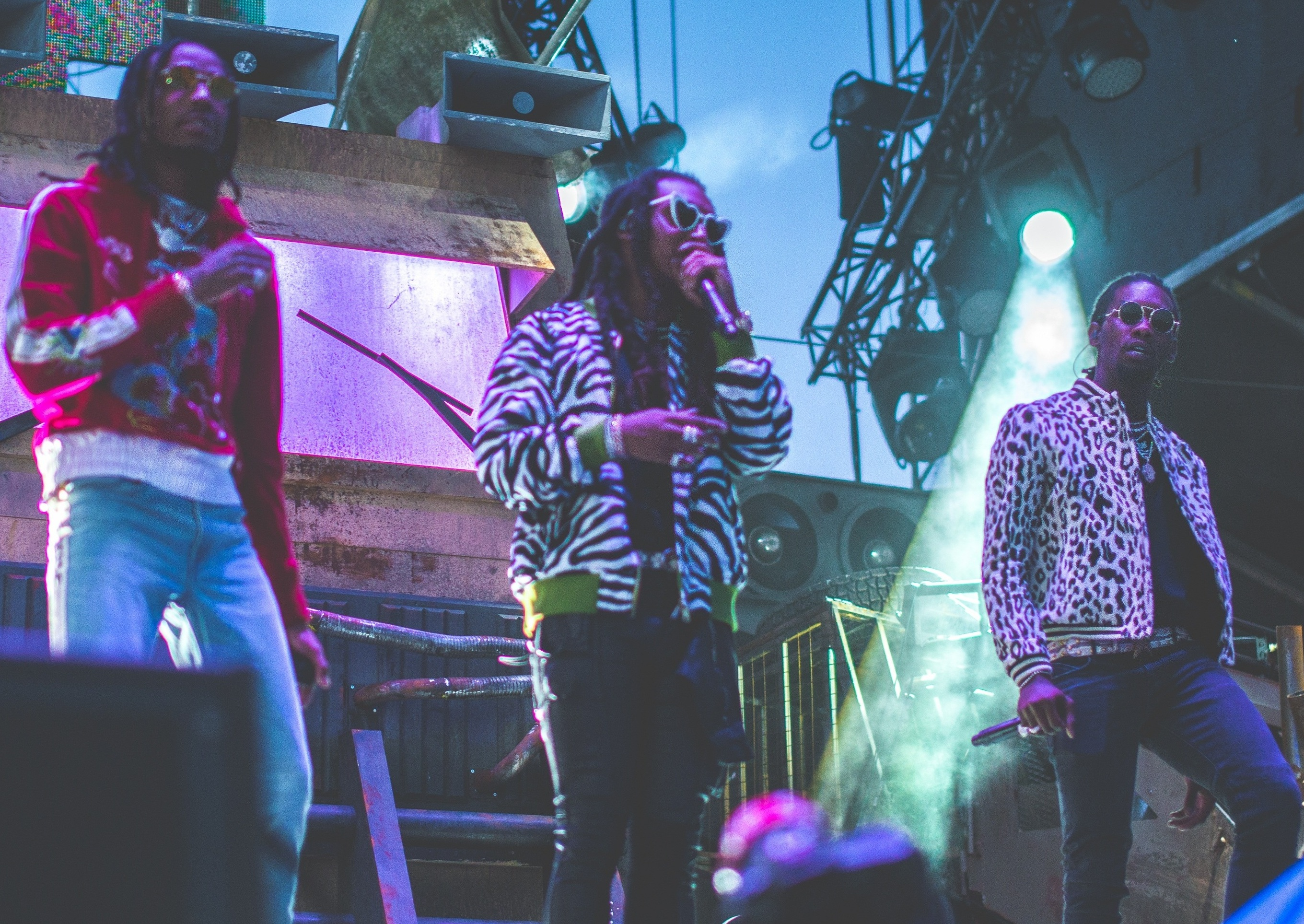
Minaj and Cardi B's collaboration on the 2017 song "MotorSport" by hip hop trio Migos (pictured) led to further discussions of a feud between them

Minaj and Cardi B collaborated on the hip hop group Migos' song "MotorSport", which was released in December 2017 with a music video as a single from the group's 2018 album Culture II. The two rappers' verses were believed by fans to be disses toward one another. Both denied these claims, with Cardi B stating in an interview with Complex that "people just want that drama" and that fans "wouldn't even be satisfied even if me and [Nicki] was making out". Minaj agreed with her in a tweet. A lyric from Minaj's original verse ("If Cardi the QB, I'm Nick Lombardi") was also changed to replace Cardi B's name with Quavo's. Minaj alleged on Twitter the following year that Atlantic Records, Cardi B's record label, had asked her to remove Cardi B's name from her verse per her request. Despite Minaj's insistence that the song had already been finished by the time Cardi B was added to it, Cardi B said in a Capital Xtra interview prior to the song's release that Minaj's verse was unfinished when she was first asked by Quavo to join the song. Quavo corroborated Cardi B's explanation. The two did not appear onscreen together in the music video, which was noted by fans, though Quavo later said in an interview with Ebro Darden that he attempted to get them to. Minaj claimed in 2018 that it was because her hairstylist, Tokyo Stylez, had a scheduling conflict the day of the video shoot.

In April 2018, Minaj said tearfully in an interview with Beats 1 that she had been "really, really hurt" by Cardi B's lack of public support and "genuine love" toward her, citing her 2017 Capital Xtra interview as an example, and that Cardi B should have been more enthusiastic to have collaborated with her. The interview further fueled rumors of their feud. In another Beats 1 interview soon after, Cardi B said that the feud had been fabricated by fans online due to their being entertained by "see[ing] people beef".

==== Met Gala photographs ====
Three photographs of Minaj and Cardi B conversing at the 2018 Met Gala briefly squashed rumors of a feud between the two. Cardi B stated in an interview on The Howard Stern Show soon after that the photo showed them speaking about a "misunderstanding" and that they had never had a feud. In August 2018, Minaj said on her Beats 1 radio show Queen Radio that she "didn't know Cardi and I had an issue" and that she "may have taken an issue with things that I've said", though she did not specify what they were. Also that month, Minaj got into a separate feud with reality television personality DJ Self, who was also Cardi B's former costar on Love & Hip Hop: New York, after he posted on Instagram that Cardi B had "the best female album out", referring to her debut studio album Invasion of Privacy, which he later deleted. Minaj responded, alleging that he had previously been dissing Cardi B to try and earn Minaj's favor and that he had been spreading rumors about Cardi B to Minaj.

==== New York Fashion Week altercation and aftermath ====
On September 7, 2018, during Christina Aguilera's performance at Harper's Bazaar's invite-only "Icons" party at the Plaza Hotel for New York Fashion Week, Cardi B lunged at Minaj as she was leaving. In a video of the altercation, Cardi B yelled, "Bitch, come here!" and "I will fuck you up!" at Minaj, then threw a shoe toward Minaj and at reality television personality Rah Ali, Minaj's friend and one of Cardi B's co-stars on Love & Hip Hop: New York. She was escorted out of the building barefoot, with her Dolce & Gabbana dress torn and a large knot over her eye, the result of one of Minaj's security guards elbowing her in the face. A photo of her walking out of the party with the knot on her head soon went viral online and the incident was widely reported on. Cardi B soon posted on Instagram, alleging that the attempted fight was prompted by Minaj liking comments about her abilities as a mother and speaking about her daughter, Kulture, whom she had given birth to two months prior. She also claimed in the post that Minaj had tried to "stop [her] bags" by lying about her and threatening not to work with artists who worked with her. Two days later, Minaj denied talking about Kulture, stating on Queen Radio, "I would never talk about anyone's child or parenting." She also described the fight as "mortifying" and "humiliating" and called Cardi B a "disgusting pig" whose career had been bolstered by "sympathy and payola". Days later, Cardi B reposted a photo of a young girl recreating her look at the party, joking that the girl "forgot the knot" on her head.

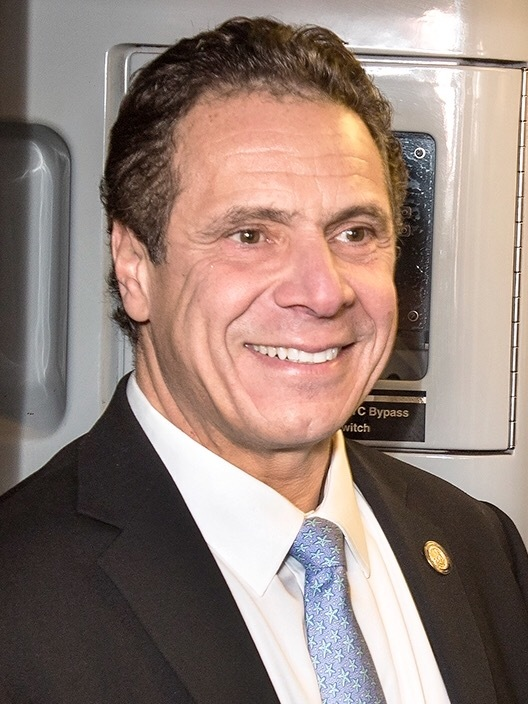
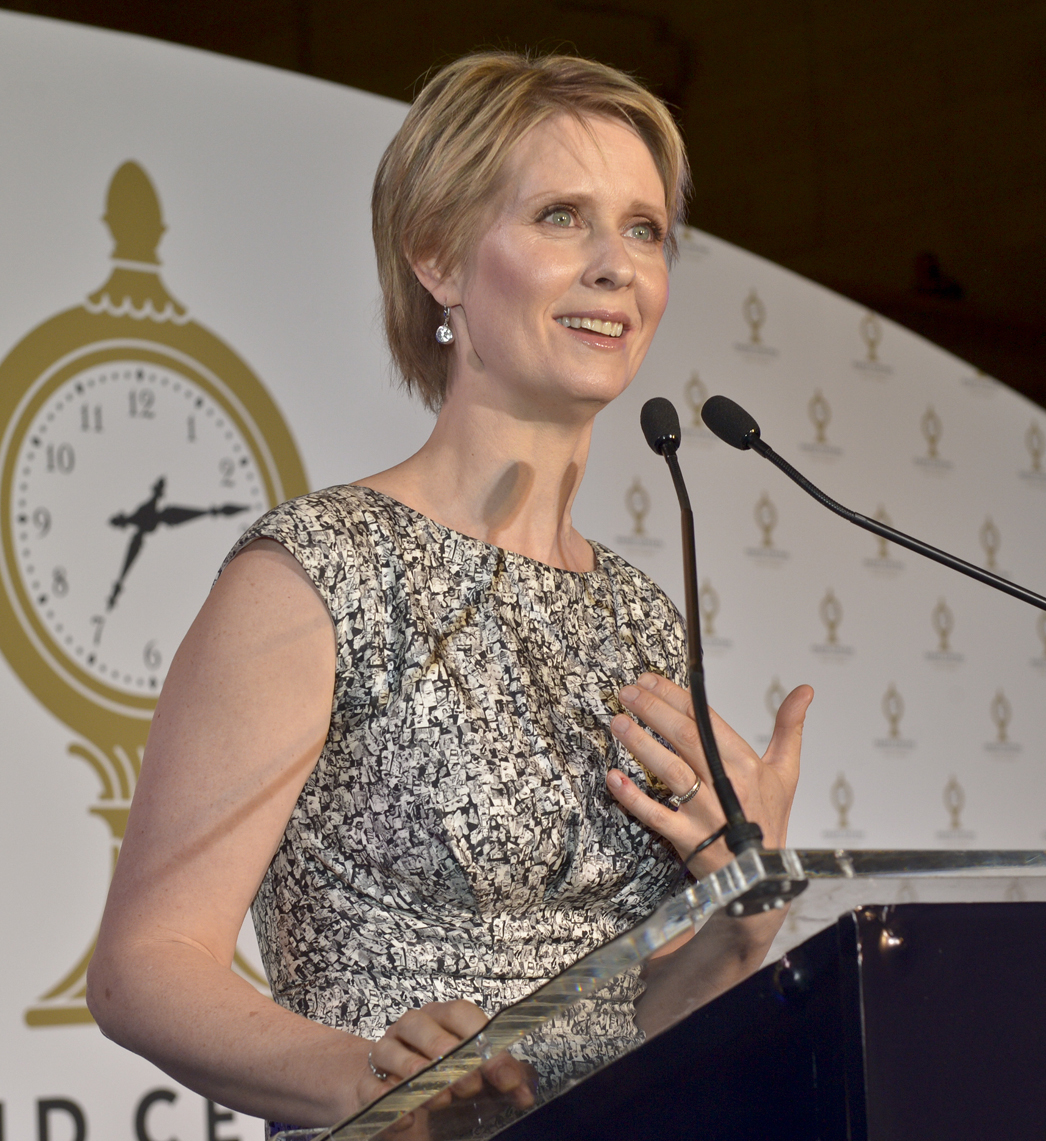
Shortly after Minaj endorsed Andrew Cuomo (left) in the 2018 New York democratic gubernatorial primary election, Cardi B endorsed rival candidate Cynthia Nixon (right), which was described as an escalation of their feud.

Minaj and Cardi B soon endorsed rival candidates in the 2018 New York democratic gubernatorial primary election, with Minaj endorsing Andrew Cuomo on Twitter and Cardi B endorsing Cynthia Nixon on Instagram a day later. Judy Kurtz of The Hill wrote that their opposite endorsements showed that "the battle between [them] appears to be intensifying", while Eric Durkin of The Guardian called them "duelling last-minute endorsements from the feuding rappers". For The Journal of Aesthetics and Art Criticism, Christopher Jenkins described Cardi B's verse on her and Pardison Fontaine's collaborative single "Backin' It Up", which was released shortly after the altercation and on which she raps "I know how to make a bitch mad, don't I?" and "Chill with the beef and try some chicken instead", as Cardi B signifyin' at Minaj by indirectly referencing their feud. In October 2018, Minaj began selling merchandise bearing the phrase "Nicki Stopped My Bag", which she had previously made into a Twitter meme that mocked Cardi B's Instagram post following the fight. In an interview with W, Cardi B said that Minaj had been "taking a lot of shots" at her "for a while now", but that they had spoken twice before the altercation and had "come to an understanding". However, she said, Minaj "kept going", including, according to her, liking and then unliking a tweet that made fun of her as a mother and sparked the attempted fight. She responded to critics of where she chose to try and fight Minaj by saying, "I'm not going to catch another artist in the grocery store or down the block."

In an October 29 episode of Queen Radio, Minaj alleged that Rah Ali had punched Cardi B at the New York Fashion Week party; denied allegations from Cardi B's sister, influencer Hennessy Carolina, that she had leaked Cardi B's phone number to her fan pages; offered $100 thousand to anyone who could offer her surveillance footage of the attempted fight; and accused Cardi B of attempting to stop rapper 21 Savage from appearing on "No Flag". Cardi B posted a series of ten videos responding to Minaj on Instagram, in which she called her a liar; denied Minaj's claims that Rah Ali had attacked her and that she had prevented 21 Savage from appearing in the music video for "No Flag" and on the remix to Farruko and Bad Bunny's 2017 song "Krippy Kush", both of which featured Minaj; accused Minaj of leaking her phone number soon after their altercation; threatened to sue Minaj for defamation for alleging that Cardi B had used payola; and said that she was "tired of talking" about their feud. Rvssian, who produced "Krippy Kush", direct messaged Cardi B that Travis Scott had replaced 21 Savage in the song's music video due to a scheduling conflict involving his child, which she reposted to her Instagram account, and later tweeted that he was "not going to agree with something that wasn't done involving [his] song". Minaj responded that she had "never leaked a number in my life" and that it was an attempt to "make [her] look like a bad person".

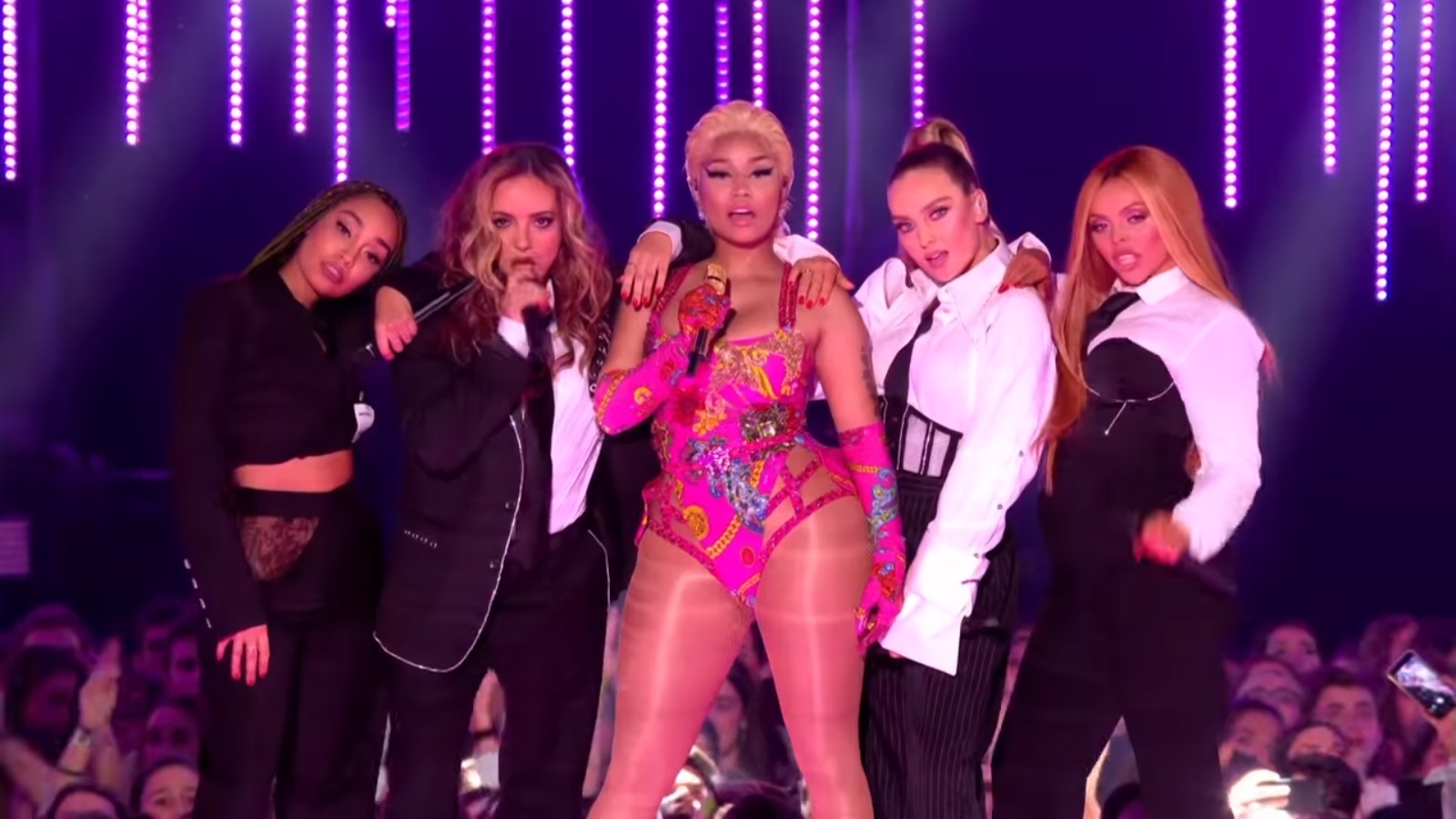
British girl group Little Mix (pictured with Minaj in 2018) denied Cardi B's claims that their single "Woman Like Me", which featured Minaj, was intended to feature her and given to Minaj after she declined.

Cardi B also stated that both Minaj's deal with fashion brand Diesel and her feature on British girl group Little Mix's 2018 song "Woman Like Me" had originally been offered to her before she turned them down. Little Mix denied this in an Instagram post soon after, writing, "Sorry Cardi hun but this is the T. We've always wanted the Queen." A tweet from the group later stated that both rappers had been approached by their record label, Columbia Records, but that they opted to work with Minaj as it had been "a dream of [theirs] to work with her since the beginning". Bill Wackermann, the then–CEO of Wilhelmina Models—to which Minaj had been signed a year before—also denied Cardi B's claims about Minaj's Diesel deal, writing in an Instagram caption, "Tell the truth Boo! That diesel deal was built AROUND the one and only Queen." He later posted screenshots of a text message from someone who wrote that they had never offered Cardi B a deal, under which Minaj commented, alleging that Cardi B's deal with Fashion Nova had originally been offered to her. Cardi B posted a series of emails with Diesel employees to her Instagram in response, which she described as "receipts" that she had been in contact with Diesel. The videos also featured Cardi B using the word "footages", an informal plural form of "footage". As a result, "footages" became Dictionary.com's fifth most-searched word of 2018. Minaj tweeted in response to the videos that Cardi B could "only talk about deals and songs she's supposedly turned down cuz she can't talk about a verse she's ever written" and called her a "fkn fraud".

Nicki Minaj
(@NICKIMINAJ)
tweeted:

Ok you guys, let's focus on positive things only from here on out. We're all so blessed. I know this stuff is entertaining & funny to a lot of people but I won't be discussing this nonsense anymore. Thank you for the support & encouragement year after year. Love you. ♥️

October 30, 2018

Later that day, Minaj tweeted, "Ok you guys, let's focus on positive things only from here on out," adding that she would no longer "be discussing this nonsense anymore". Cardi B reposted a screenshot of the tweet to her Instagram account with the caption, "Alright then! Let's keep it positive and keep it pushing!" The posts were considered as an apparent end to their feud and as the two seemingly calling a truce.

Cardi B said in a December 2018 interview with CBS News Sunday Morning that she felt that the fight had been "bad for business" and distracted people from her music.

=== 2019–2020: Other developments ===
In February 2019, Minaj pulled out of her scheduled performance at the BET Experience after the network tweeted about Cardi B's 2018 studio album Invasion of Privacy winning the Grammy Award for Best Rap Album and added, "Meanwhile, Nicki Minaj is being dragged by her lacefront," which she retweeted a screenshot of. The network later apologized for the tweet in a statement in which they wrote that it "should never have been written". Miley Cyrus, who had previously been engaged in a feud with Minaj in 2015, referenced her feud with Cardi B in a lyric to the song "Cattitude" from her May 2019 extended play (EP) She Is Coming, in which she sang "I love you Nicki, but I listen to Cardi". She soon said in an interview about the song's lyric that both rappers were "queens" and her "go-to" when she "want[ed] to feel powerful and strong". Minaj responded to the lyric by pejoratively calling Cyrus a "Perdue chicken" who was "trying to say the queen's name for clout".

In June 2020, Australian singer Sia mistook a photo of Minaj for Cardi B in a tweet. The hashtag #SiaIsOverParty soon began trending on Twitter and Sia, believing she had restarted the feud between the two, then tweeted, "Hey @iamcardib @NICKIMINAJ you aren't thinking about a feud right now are you? We are focused on the problem of systemic racism." She later deleted the tweet and apologized to Cardi B and Minaj for the mix-up, though neither rapper ever addressed it. An audio snippet of a purported collaboration between Minaj and Cardi B titled "Lavish" circulated on Twitter in October 2020. In November 2020, Cardi B called out rapper Wiz Khalifa on Twitter for "pit[ting] successful women against each other" after he retweeted a Minaj fan, who criticized the Grammy Awards for awarding Cardi B and not Minaj, and responded that "most self made artists" were snubbed by award shows.

=== 2025: Twitter argument ===
Cardi B's second studio album, Am I the Drama?, was released on September 19, 2025, and debuted at number one on the Billboard 200. By then, she was pregnant with her fourth child and her first with her boyfriend, football player Stefon Diggs.

On September 29, 2025, Minaj tweeted "$4.99", the sale price of the album on iTunes, implying that the album's success had been overstated and inflated by discounts. In another set of tweets that day, she parodied the lyrics of the album's track "Magnet" to mock Cardi B's pregnancy—calling her "Barney B" and AI-generating several photos of Cardi B as the character—and album sales, and to accuse Cardi B of having human papillomavirus (HPV) and getting surgery to look like Minaj. Cardi B responded with a tweet also parodying the lyrics, which referenced Minaj's husband, Kenneth Petty, being a registered sex offender, and her brother, Jelani Maraj, being sentenced to 20 years in prison for sexually assaulting his 11-year-old stepdaughter. In a series of tweets that followed the next day, Cardi B accused Minaj of having Percocet-related fertility issues; called her "Cocaine Barbie"; and wrote that Minaj compared her own commercial success to Cardi B's instead of that of Rihanna, Taylor Swift, Drake, or other artists who started their careers around the same time as Minaj because she was "doing lower than all of them". She also responded to Minaj threatening physical violence against her sister by telling her to "drop the addy right now".

Cardi B
(@iamcardib)
tweeted:

Alright now this the third tweet talkin about my pregnancy… like you wasn’t going to different fertility doctors cuz you couldn’t reproduce from all them percs scrambling your eggs. NOT ALLEGEDLY…Lord protect my babies

September 30, 2025Tweetiamcardib-pregnancy

The next day, Minaj wrote that Cardi B should not have resorted to using fertility issues as a point of criticism.

Nicki Minaj
(@nickiminaj)
tweeted:

Also let me say this, tho I have never had fertility issues, it's not something to be used as a drag. Until you know the women who are actually living that pain, blaming themselves—we could only imagine & pray for them, love them, uplift them. Not use these women as a punch line

October 1, 2025

She then called Cardi B's then–seven-year-old daughter, whom she referred to as "Kulture Vulture", ugly, saying she would "kick [her] gums back into formation", and also called her youngest daughter Blossom a "monkey and a roach". She also repeatedly criticized Jay-Z throughout the argument and accused him of wearing a wig, at one point telling him to "take off that fucking lace front". Cardi B responded by calling Minaj's son, whom she gave birth to with Kenneth Petty in 2020 and referred to as "Papa Bear" in public, "slow", alleged that Minaj's drug use had made him nonverbal, wrote that their argument was taking place during his birthday, and joked that his "[favorite] color is 5". She also claimed that Minaj had been diagnosed with schizophrenia and bipolar disorder. Minaj called for a boycott of any company affiliated with Cardi B within three days based on her "disgusting remarks about children", specifically calling out Walmart and DoorDash, and criticized TMZ founder Harvey Levin for TMZ's coverage of the feud. Cardi B tweeted a letter addressed to Minaj that she claimed would be her last response to her, in which she wrote that Minaj needed therapy to "heal that trauma"—alleging that her father sexually abused her as a child while using crack cocaine—and made claims that Petty encouraged her alleged drug use so that he could "max out [her] credit card" and "buy the hood chains" while she was passed out.

Cardi B
(@iamcardib)
tweeted:

Dear Onika Tanya Maraj, This my last time responding to you because this past Twitter now.. I gotta see you… but first ima tell you truth.. You said out your own mouth that the lil girl in you haven’t forgave your mother yet and that’s because your mom used to stay silent when your dad used to touch on you everytime he did that crack pipe… I know you experienced a lot of trauma and abuse but drugs is not gonna help you.. you need to go to therapy NOW… ima let you know this today.. your husband is not stoppin you from your actions because he lets you do drugs all day to numb you so he can max out your credit card… yea you think I don’t know?? Them queens nikkas that you be letting in your house everytime you kick them out be coming and spilling your tea in the hood.. but I’m gonna be the realest person to ever tell you.. YOU NEED TO GET HELP!! You need to heal that trauma.. you always coming at people everytime you see them happy because you got so much trauma and pain that you wanna put on others.. your fans are gonna gas you up while you literally lose your god damn mind…. You don’t have no friends.. no family.. just that man in your house that let you do drugs til you pass out so he can spend your money and buy the hood chains.. I’m not throwing away my career and my endorsements going back and forth with wit words wit a possessed drug addict.. ILL SEE YOU WHEN I SEE YOU

October 1, 2025

Minaj tweeted an apology to Kulture the following day, writing that she "did all of this for a bigger purpose" but that Kulture was "an innocent child & [did not] deserve any of this". Twitter users criticized it as a non-apology apology and Cardi B responded with a facetious apology toward Minaj's son, calling him "Papa Perc" and writing that she hoped he could "overcome the pedophilia blood you inherited from your grandfather, father and uncle" and would not "hate me when you grow up cause your mommy rather give me more attention than she gives you", followed by her telling Minaj not to give her a "backhanded apology". She then posted that she "need[ed] to chill" and was done arguing with Minaj but that she would return. In an interview with Paper later that month, Cardi B described their Twitter argument as her first time getting "that nasty for [her] kids" and likened herself to a "mother warrior" because of it.

The hosts of The Breakfast Club criticized Minaj's exchanges with Cardi B in October 2025, with both Charlamagne Tha God and Jess Hilarious saying that they made her seem "miserable". Minaj responded in a tweet, in which she called the hosts "very nasty" and tagged President Donald Trump to ask him to put them in prison. Charlamagne Tha God labeled Minaj the show's "Donkey of the Day" in the following day's episode, saying that she had "stank and nasty" energy and went from "inspiring a generation of young women to hating on [them]" because of her "unhealed trauma". Minaj posted on her Instagram account later that month that three different people had been making unauthorized purchases to her American Express card totaling nearly $25,000, which social media users connected to Cardi B's claims that Petty used Minaj's AmEx card while she was "sedated".

== Commentary ==
For CNN, Deena Zaru wrote in early 2018 that the feud had been "made-up" by fans on social media. Radio personality Angela Yee described it at the time as "mak[ing] it seem like there can only be room for one woman to be an artist at a time in this hip-hop world", while academic Treva Lindsey said of the feud that "mediocre and less than mediocre" male rappers were not put in competition with one another in the same way as female rappers, which she attributed to the patriarchy. In April 2018, Kyle Munzenrieder wrote for W that rumors of a feud between them were social media–led "conspiracy theories" spurred by it being the first time since 2001 that two female rappers were famous enough "where even random white moms at least recognize their name". Kevin Fallon of The Daily Beast similarly wrote that month that the rappers had a "media-portrayed rivalry" prompted by "social media theories", the result of the "myopic, sexist, and racist trope" of "painting Nicki Minaj as the villain". In June 2018, Maeve McDermott of USA Today wrote that, though it was "unfair to assume Cardi and Minaj are at odds just because they're rap's two reigning women", there had been "enough drama" between them that Minaj's album Queen", which was released two months later, would be "seen as a response to Cardi's rise".

Soon after Minaj and Cardi B's altercation in September 2018, McDermott called it "the shoe-throw heard round the world" and their feud "the feud that nobody wanted to see happen" on her list of the worst music feuds of 2018, while Isabel Torrealba of Slate described their feud as "depressing". Kelly Rowland, who had witnessed the attempted fight, said in an interview with E! News about it that it was "just not the time" for "us as women to fight" when "Serena Williams is fighting for equality" and praised both rappers as "extremely talented". Love & Hip Hop producer Mona Scott-Young called the fight "disheartening". In 2025, Moises Mendez II of Out retrospectively called it "infamous". For The New York Times, Jon Caramanica wrote that Cardi B's series of Instagram videos responding to Minaj demonstrated how "in the social media era, the terrain of rap beef has expanded, as have the terms" and how, despite Cardi B being "not as good a rapper" as Minaj, "the hip-hop battlefield has relocated to Cardi's turf" of "straight talk" on social media.

As their feud was ongoing, rapper Lil Yachty stated in an October 2018 interview for the BET series Raq Rants that he would side with Cardi B "every time", citing his loyalty to her then–husband Offset, and that he "couldn't" work with Minaj despite wanting to. Mary J. Blige said in a February 2019 interview on The View that the feud was "negative" for women. Latto said in 2022 that she would not pick sides in the feud because it was "not [her] beef" and she "fuck[s] with both of them". In 2022, Ernest Owens wrote for The Daily Beast that Minaj's "penchant for indulging in embarrassing online nastiness" and "beefing with newcomers left and right" started with Cardi B in 2018 and caused later feuds with rappers Megan Thee Stallion and Latto. GloRilla's song "Aite" from her 2024 mixtape Ehhthang Ehhthang included a call for the feud to end, with her rapping, "I just pray one day the bad bitches would come together/'Cause Cardi and Nicki on a track would break some fuckin' records". Krystal Kakimoto, writing for the International Journal of Information, Diversity, & Inclusion in 2022, called the feud "infamous".

During their 2025 feud on Twitter, Charleston White expressed support for Minaj and accused Cardi of "fuck[ing] her way to the top". After remaining neutral on the feud since its beginning, 50 Cent posted on Instagram in 2025 that he hoped it would end soon due to the dangerous nature of the things both rappers were posting about one another. Users on TikTok and Threads showed support for Cardi B and largely expressed disappointment in Minaj. Pie Gonzaga of Rolling Stone Philippines called the feud's reescalation potentially "the biggest and nastiest celebrity Twitter feud in a long time", while Amber Corrine of Vibe wrote that the feud showed them both "stoop[ing] to new lows". For The Cut, Olivia Craighead called it a "truly ugly fight" centered around both rappers' children that made her "tired", adding, "There are a lot of other ways to go about this that aren't in front of millions of people online." Cerys Davies of Los Angeles Times remarked that Minaj's insults toward Cardi B's children were "mean-spirited".
