= Kirsten Smith (writer) =

American screenwriter and novelist (born 1970)

Kirsten "Kiwi" Smith
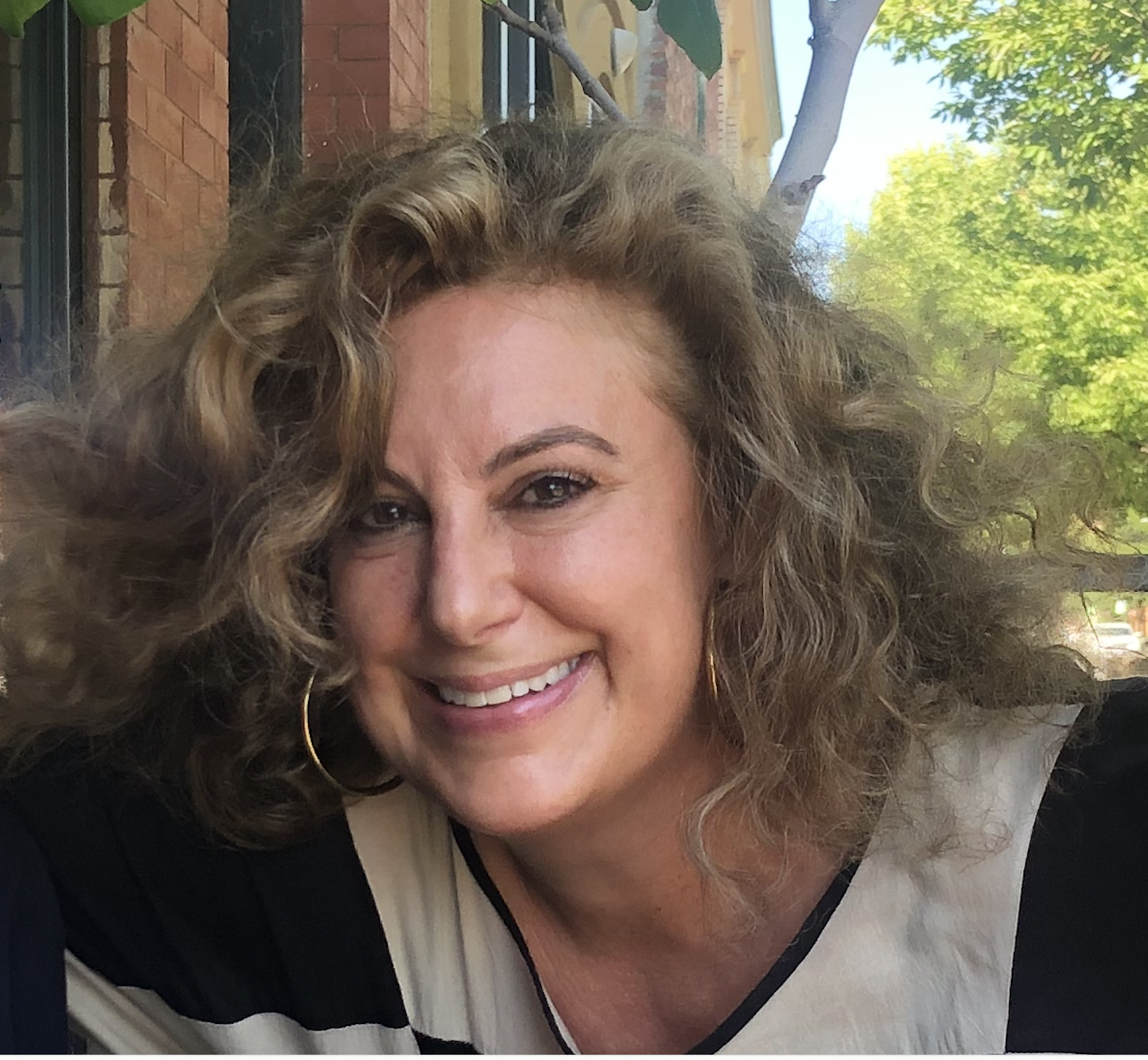
- Smith in 2022
- Born: August 12, 1970 (age 56); Contra Costa County, California
- Occupations: Screenwriter; Novelist
- Website: kiwilovesyou.com

Kirsten M. "Kiwi" Smith (born August 12, 1970) is an American screenwriter and novelist whose credits include Legally Blonde and Ella Enchanted. She has written most of her screenplays with her screenwriter partner Karen McCullah.

== Early life ==
Kirsten M. Smith was born, 12 August 1970, in Contra Costa County, California and grew up in San Pedro, Los Angeles, on a sailboat, without TV, and spent much of her childhood writing. After her family moved to Port Ludlow, Washington, she worked as a clerk at a video store before moving to Los Angeles in 1988 to attend Occidental College, studying English and Film, and getting a degree in 1992, then attended NYU's film program.

While in college, she often submitted poems to local magazines, and after graduation, she received a scholarship to attend the Bread Loaf Writers' Conference in Vermont and was a resident writer at MacDowell, after which she realized she could only advance her poetry career by getting a MFA and going into academia. She then decided to screenwrite for a living to support her poetry.

== Career ==
While in college, Smith got an internship at CineTel Films, an independent film company; after, she began working for CineTel, reading scripts and writing coverage for them. This led to a full-time job there as a Director of Development in 1995, and then she began pursuing screenwriting in earnest. One of the scripts she happened to read and cover was written by Karen McCullah, an aspiring writer living in Denver, Colorado. The two women formed a friendship over the phone, and when McCullah came to Los Angeles, they met in person, and began writing their first script on cocktail napkins that night. That script never sold, but it inspired the women to write together again, and they embarked on a teen comedy called 10 Things I Hate About You, a twist on William Shakespeare's Taming of the Shrew partially inspired by the recent teen comedy Clueless.

In 1997, Smith made her first sale as a screenwriter, with 10 Things I Hate About You, a speculative screenplay. Shortly thereafter, the movie was green-lit, starring the-then-unknown Heath Ledger and Julia Stiles It was shot in Tacoma, Washington, near Smith's hometown. In the writing process for 10 Things, Smith was eager to add feminism and post-feminism from her women's studies classes into the movie's context and had wanted more of a riot grrrl sound for the soundtrack.

Smith went on to co-write Legally Blonde, which was nominated for two Golden Globes. Costing only $18M to produce, the movie was a surprise hit, grossing $20M in its opening weekend in July 2001, and going on to make over $140M worldwide. It also spawned a sequel and a successful Broadway musical, which was based on Smith and Lutz's screenplay.

Smith followed that with Ella Enchanted, starring Anne Hathaway, and She's the Man, a DreamWorks update of Shakespeare's Twelfth Night, starring Amanda Bynes.

In 2006, Smith published a verse novel, The Geography of Girlhood, having published more than 40 poems in various literary magazines in the 1990s. The coming-of-age story of a teenage girl growing up in the Pacific Northwest, it contains a smattering of the poems Smith wrote and published in her early twenties.

In 2008, she wrote and directed a short film, The Spleenectomy, which starred Anna Faris and was financed and produced by Glamour magazine's Reel Moments. She also co-wrote and executive produced The House Bunny, starring Anna Faris, and produced by Adam Sandler's Happy Madison Productions. It grossed almost $50M domestically.

In 2009, she co-wrote The Ugly Truth, directed by Legally Blonde collaborator Robert Luketic and starring Katherine Heigl and Gerard Butler. Her first film as a non-writing producer, Whip It!, starred Elliot Page and was directed by Drew Barrymore, and she also produced American Virgin in 2009, starring Jenna Dewan and Rob Schneider.

Her 2013 novel, Trinkets, was adapted into a streaming television series in 2019. The series has received several Daytime Emmy nominations and wins. It received the award in the Outstanding Writing for a Children's or Young Adult Program category in 2020, as well as the Outstanding Young Adult Drama category in 2020 and 2021.

Smith has also created the graphic novel series Misfit City alongside fellow writer Kurt Lustgarten and illustrator Naomi Franquiz. The narrative follows a group of four small-town girls who set off on an adventure after they find an ancient pirate map. In October 2021, it was announced that HBO Max had started to develop an animated television series based on the comics.

In September 2022, it was announced that Smith and longtime screenwriting partner McCullah were writing a new romantic comedy, titled I Do... Not. The movie is being produced by Mark Vahradian and Lorenzo di Bonaventura for Amazon.

The Smith-McCullah duo worked on a rewrite for K-Pop: Lost in America. The movie will focus on a K-pop band who is about to do their US debut in New York's Madison Square Garden, but accidentally end up in Waco, Texas. Charles Melton and Rebel Wilson are reported to headline the film.

== Credits ==
=== Novels ===
- The Geography of Girlhood (2006) – ISBN 978-0-316-01735-0
- Trinkets (2013) – ISBN 978-0316457620
- Misfit City: Volume One (2018) – ISBN 978-1-68415-027-4
- Misfit City: Volume Two (2018) – ISBN 978-1-68415-172-1

=== Feature films ===
- 10 Things I Hate About You (1999) - an adaptation of William Shakespeare's The Taming of the Shrew set in a modern American high school
- Legally Blonde (2001) - screen adaptation of Amanda Brown's novel Legally Blonde
- Ella Enchanted (2004) - screen adaptation of Gail Carson Levine's 1997 novel Ella Enchanted
- She's the Man (2006) - an adaptation of William Shakespeare's play Twelfth Night, or What You Will.
- The House Bunny (2008)
- The Ugly Truth (2009)
- One for the Money (2012) - film adaptation of Janet Evanovich's 1994 novel One for the Money.

=== Short films ===
- The Spleenectomy (2008) (Reel Moments)
- The Multi-Hyphenate (2009) (Funny or Die)

=== Television ===
- Trinkets (2019)

=== Screenplays (unproduced) ===
- a remake of Nine to Five
