= Reel Moments =

Annual film series project

Reel Moments (sometimes Glamour Reel Moments or Glamour's Reel Moments) is an annual film series project by the magazine Glamour. The program entails a competition where its readers submit short stories with three being selected to be made into short films. The short stories submitted are all personal non-fiction essays. Actors, directors, and crew all donate their time to the project. Sponsors fund scripting, production, and screening costs. Proceeds benefit a charity chosen by each director, such as FilmAid International. It is hoped that the directing experience will open doors for female directors.

Each film is directed by a woman, often a celebrity. As of 2011, 20 films have been produced through the program, including giving directorial debuts to Jennifer Aniston, Jessica Biel, Courteney Cox, Kirsten Dunst, Bryce Dallas Howard, Kate Hudson, Eva Mendes, Demi Moore, and Rachel Weisz. The films are also matched up with female talent throughout the production process, including actresses. Objectives of the project include empowering women by producing female-friendly short films while creating opportunities for actresses to direct and extending the Glamour brand.

== History ==
=== 2004 ===
In 2004, inspired by BMW’s short film series, Glamour Magazine's Publisher Bill Wackermann and his Associate Publisher Leslie Russo https://www.nytimes.com/2006/07/31/business/media/glamours-hollywood-side-films-by-and-about-women.html wanted to attract new advertisers, with Francesca Silvestri as a producer of the film series. Each year, as a part of their general media buy, different advertiser(s) would be the new sponsor(s) of the film series.

=== 2005 ===
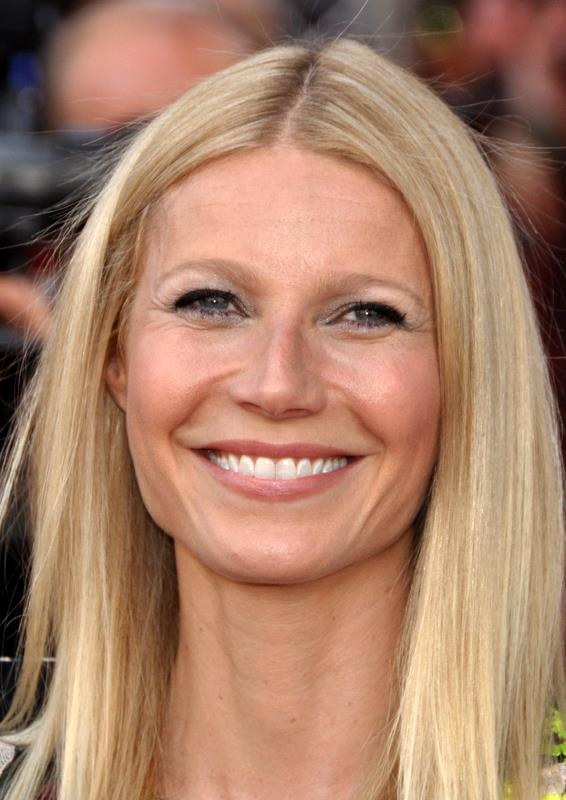
Gwyneth Paltrow directed in 2005, the inaugural year of the project

The series began in 2005 with Bebe Stores, Elizabeth Arden, and Mercury as sponsors. That year, the winners from among the 4000 750-word essays were selected for production by an advisory board of female executives and actresses that included Katie Holmes, Lucy Liu, and Julianna Margulies. Among the directors that year was Gwyneth Paltrow who made her directorial debut. She co-directed Dealbreaker with Mary Wigmore, and the film was introduced in the previews of Ryan Reynolds' Just Friends. She also, co-wrote the film. One of the shorts was accepted into the 2006 Sundance Film Festival and earned the Grammy Award for Best Arrangement, Instrumental and Vocals at the 48th Annual Grammy Awards on February 8, 2006 for "What Are You Doing the Rest of Your Life?", which was a soundtrack song performed by Chris Botti and Sting. All of the films that year were selected to the Santa Barbara International Film Festival. A DVD of the winning films was included in the December 2005 edition of Glamour. Talia Lugacy was also a director in 2005, and her short, Little Black Dress, was received so well that she parlayed the experience into a directing role for the 2007 movie Descent. Other directors in the first year were Jenny Bicks, Lisa Leone, and Trudie Styler, while actresses included Rosario Dawson and Debi Mazar.

=== 2006 ===
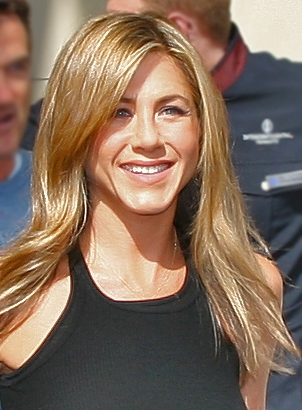
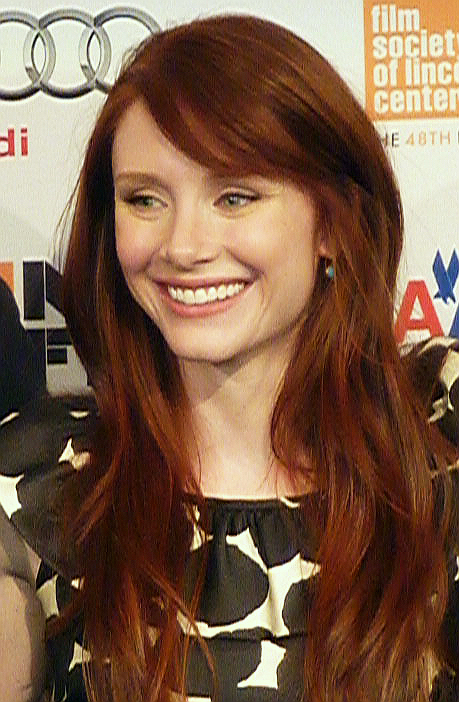
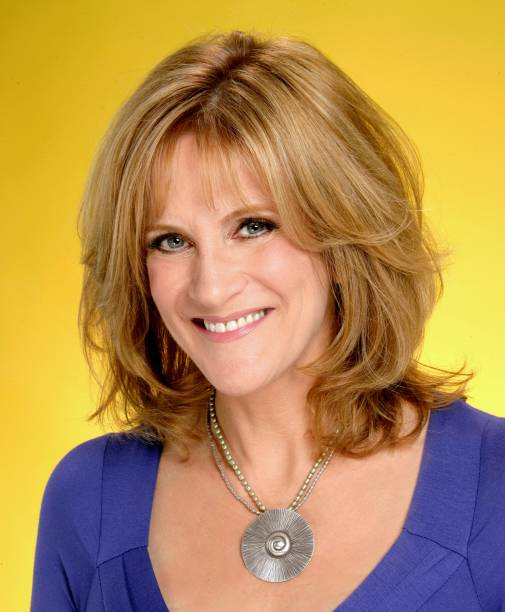
left to right: Jennifer Aniston, Bryce Dallas Howard, and Carol Leifer directed in 2006

Cartier SA paid Glamour 1.8 million dollars to be the sponsor in 2006. The 2006 entries had a love theme about moments in the lives of the entrants that made them "victorious, stronger or wiser." The 2006 selections, which were available on Glamour's website, debuted at the Directors Guild of America in Los Angeles and were shown in 10 cities. Jennifer Aniston's film, Room 10, starred Kris Kristofferson and Robin Wright. Another film that year was by Bryce Dallas Howard, the daughter of director Ron Howard, who directed Orchids, a love story that she co-wrote starring Alfred Molina and Katherine Waterston. Carol Leifer was the final director of Blinders starring Jamie-Lynn Sigler. The publicity for the 2006 films continued well into 2007. They appeared in the Palm Springs International Festival of Short Films in August 2007. After having been written, directed and acted almost entirely by women, the films were also produced by a woman from Moxie Pictures in Los Angeles. Aniston, who was a first-time director, co-directed with Andrea Buchanan.

=== 2007 ===
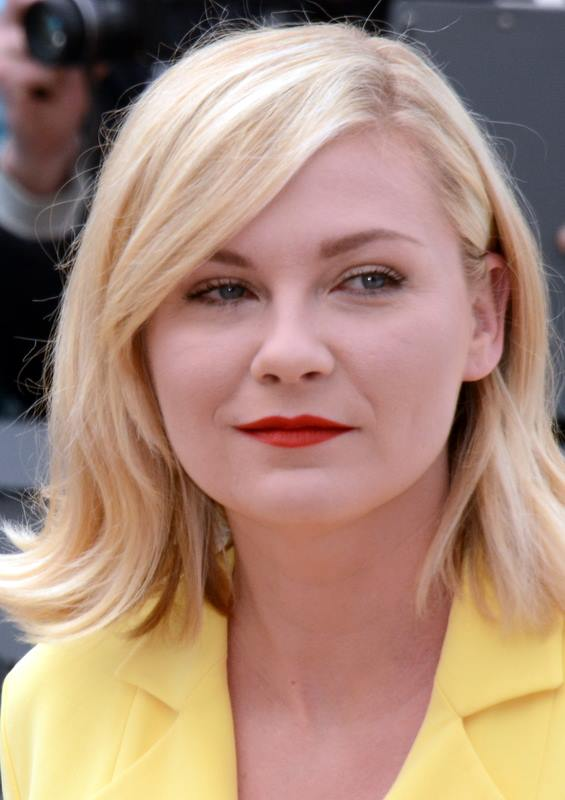
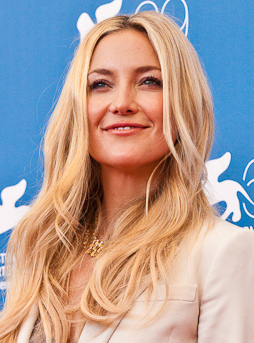
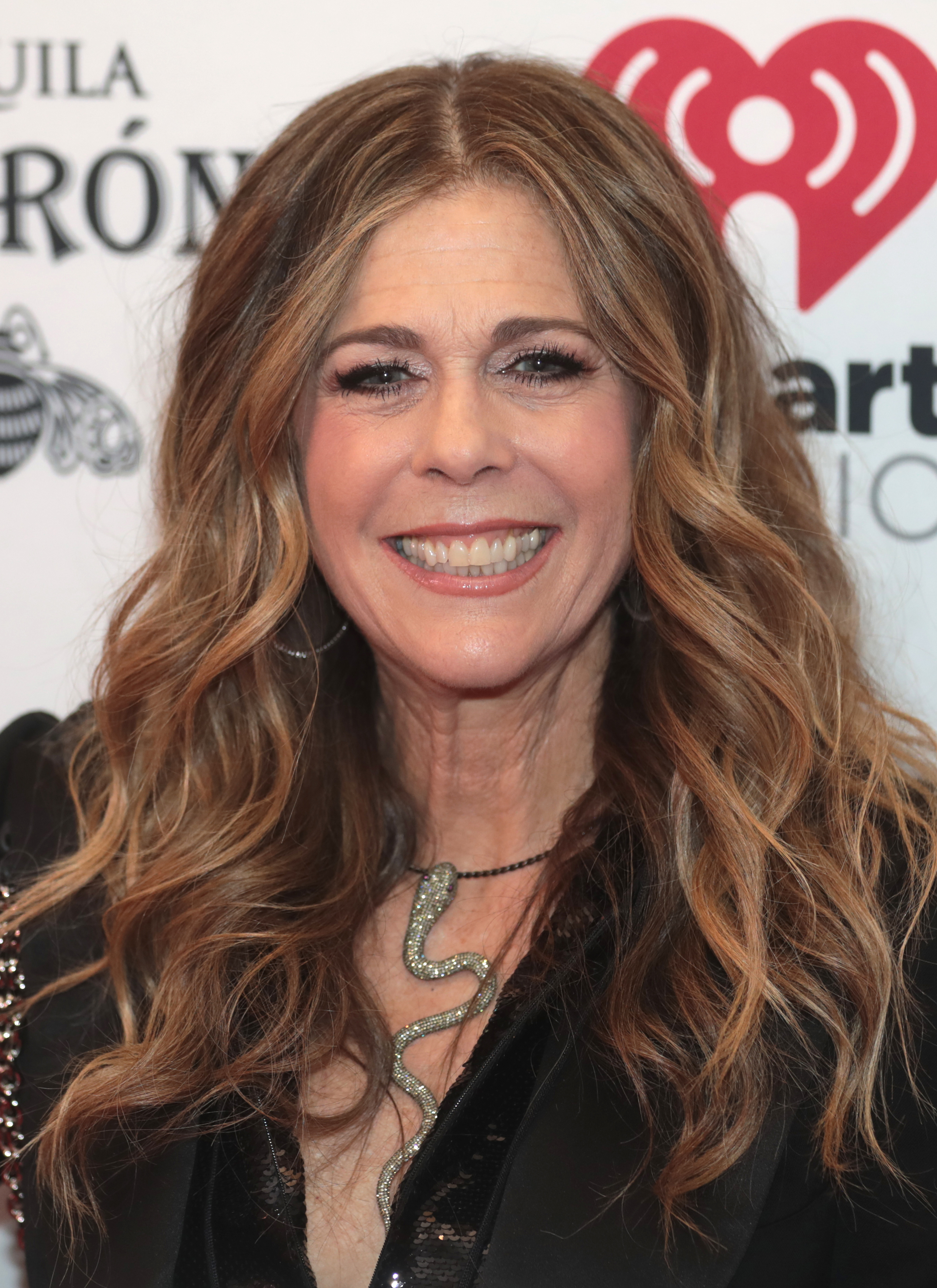
left to right: Kirsten Dunst, Kate Hudson, and Rita Wilson directed in 2007

The 2007 contest was introduced in the January 2007 edition of Glamour. That year, the directors were Kirsten Dunst, Kate Hudson, and Rita Wilson. The acting talent included Camilla Belle, Chevy Chase, Dakota Fanning, Virginia Madsen, Kurt Russell, Winona Ryder, Kristen Stewart, Channing Tatum, Jeanne Tripplehorn, and Aisha Tyler. Hudson directed Chase, Fanning, Madsen, Russell, and Stewart; Dunst cast Ryder in her film and Wilson's film starred Tripplehorn. Wilson sings the closing track in her film. In 2007, Glamour and Clinique partnered to support Big Brothers Big Sisters of America with a $1 donation for each of the first 10,000 viewers of the freely accessible productions online. The 2007 contest's theme for the short story entries was happiness. The films debuted October 9 at the Director's Guild Theater and were available at glamour.com and clinique.com starting October 15. They were also presented on October 13 in the hometowns of each writer. In 2007, the project expanded to include a summit of alumni and filmmaking grant.

=== 2008 ===
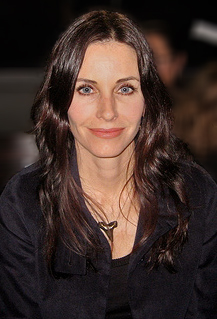
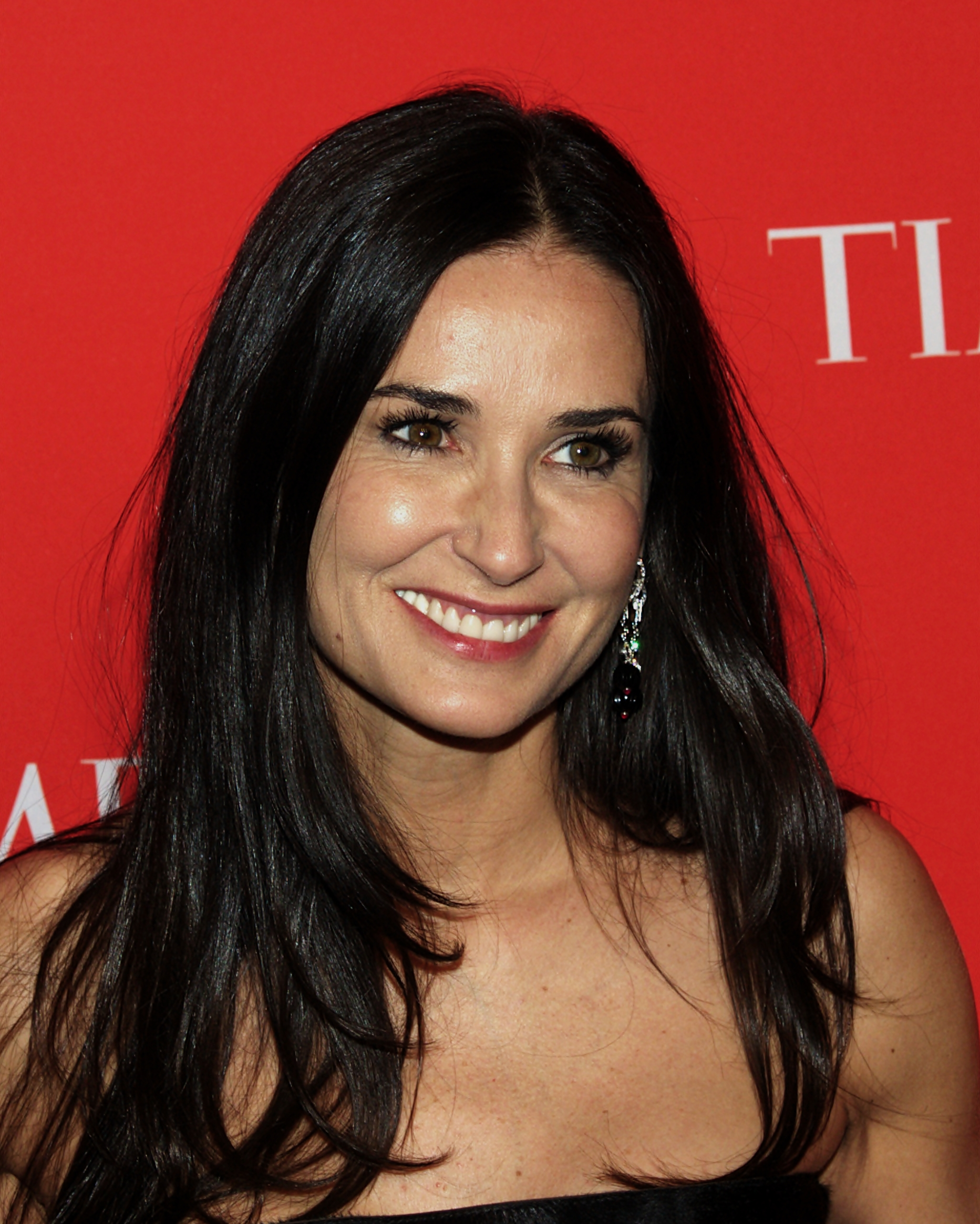
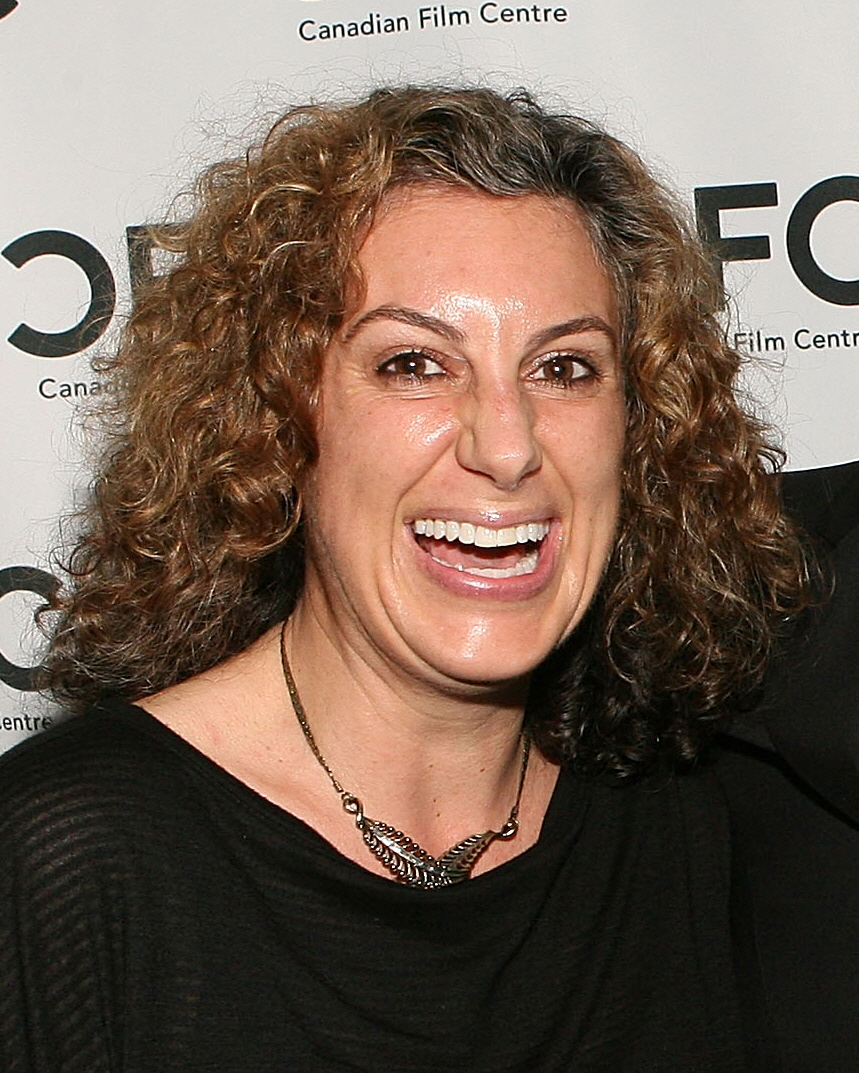
left to right: Courteney Cox, Demi Moore, and Kirsten "Kiwi" Smith directed in 2008

In 2008, the directors were Courteney Cox, Demi Moore, and Kirsten "Kiwi" Smith. The films were debuted at the Directors Guild of America headquarters on October 14, 2008. Moore directed Brittany Snow, Sarah Wright, and Madeline Zima as well as her daughter Rumer Willis in a 12-minute film titled Streak. Cox directed Laura Dern in the 19-minute film entitled "The Monday Before Thanksgiving". Smith directed Anna Faris in The Spleenectomy.

=== 2010 ===
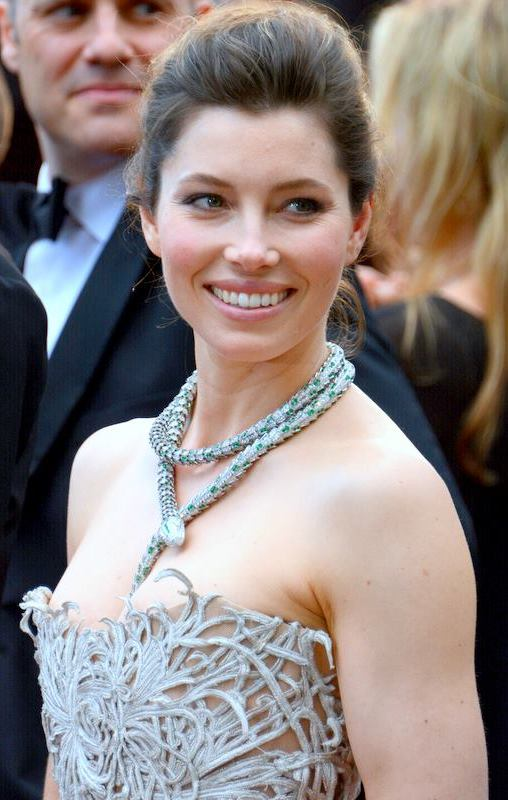
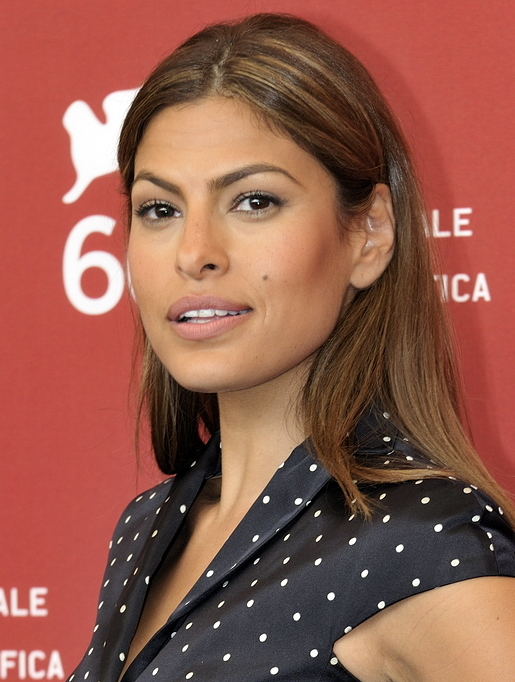
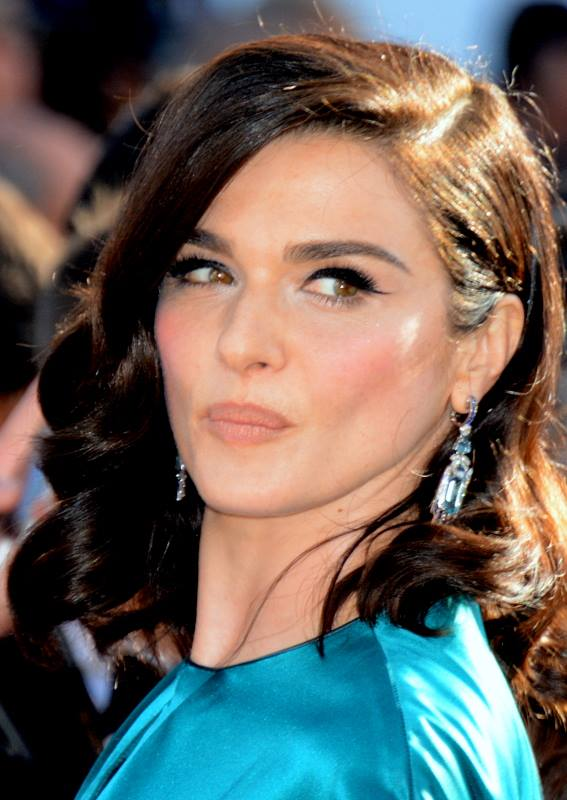
left to right: Jessica Biel, Eva Mendes, and Rachel Weisz directed in 2010

The 2010 directors were Jessica Biel, Eva Mendes, and Rachel Weisz, and all made directorial debuts. The films debuted at the Directors Guild Theater on October 25, 2010 with Weisz in absentia. Sponsor Hyundai Motor Company selected the theme of "doing good" for the contest in 2010. Mendes' film, which was entitled "California Romanza", included a cast of Troy Garity, Kathy Najimy, Christina Ricci, and Daniel Stern. The project continued to benefit FilmAid International. Biel's short, which included performances by youth actresses Emily Skinner and Tyler Wilkins, was entitled "Sodalis". Weisz debuted with a film entitled "Stop Thief", starring Rosemarie DeWitt and Joel Edgerton.

=== 2011 ===
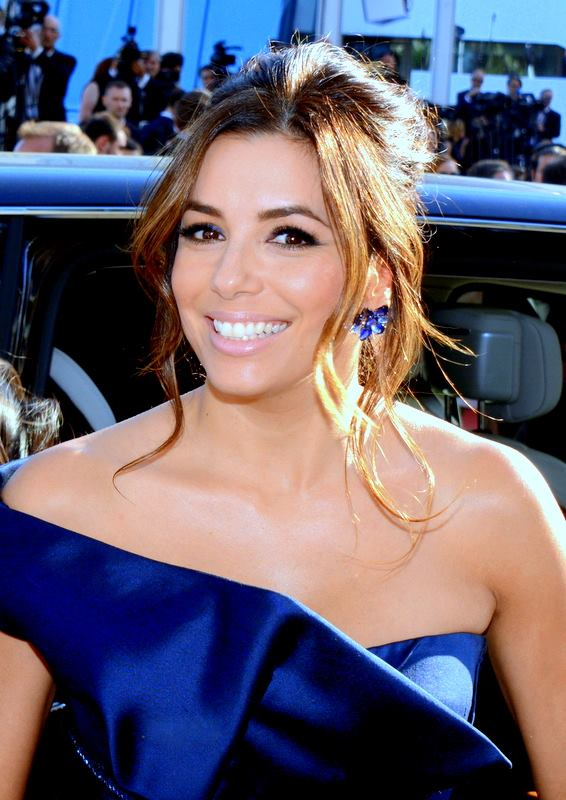
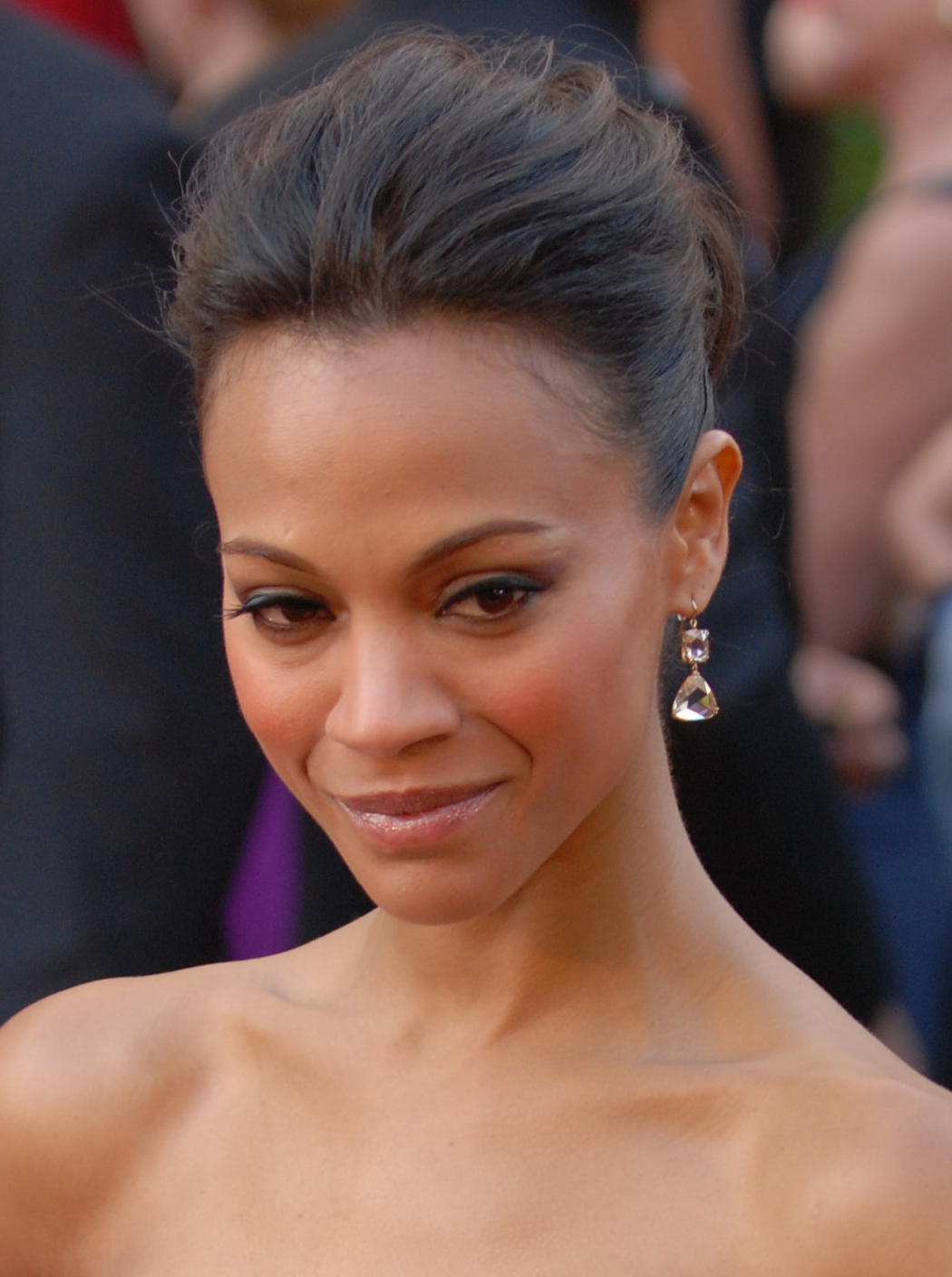
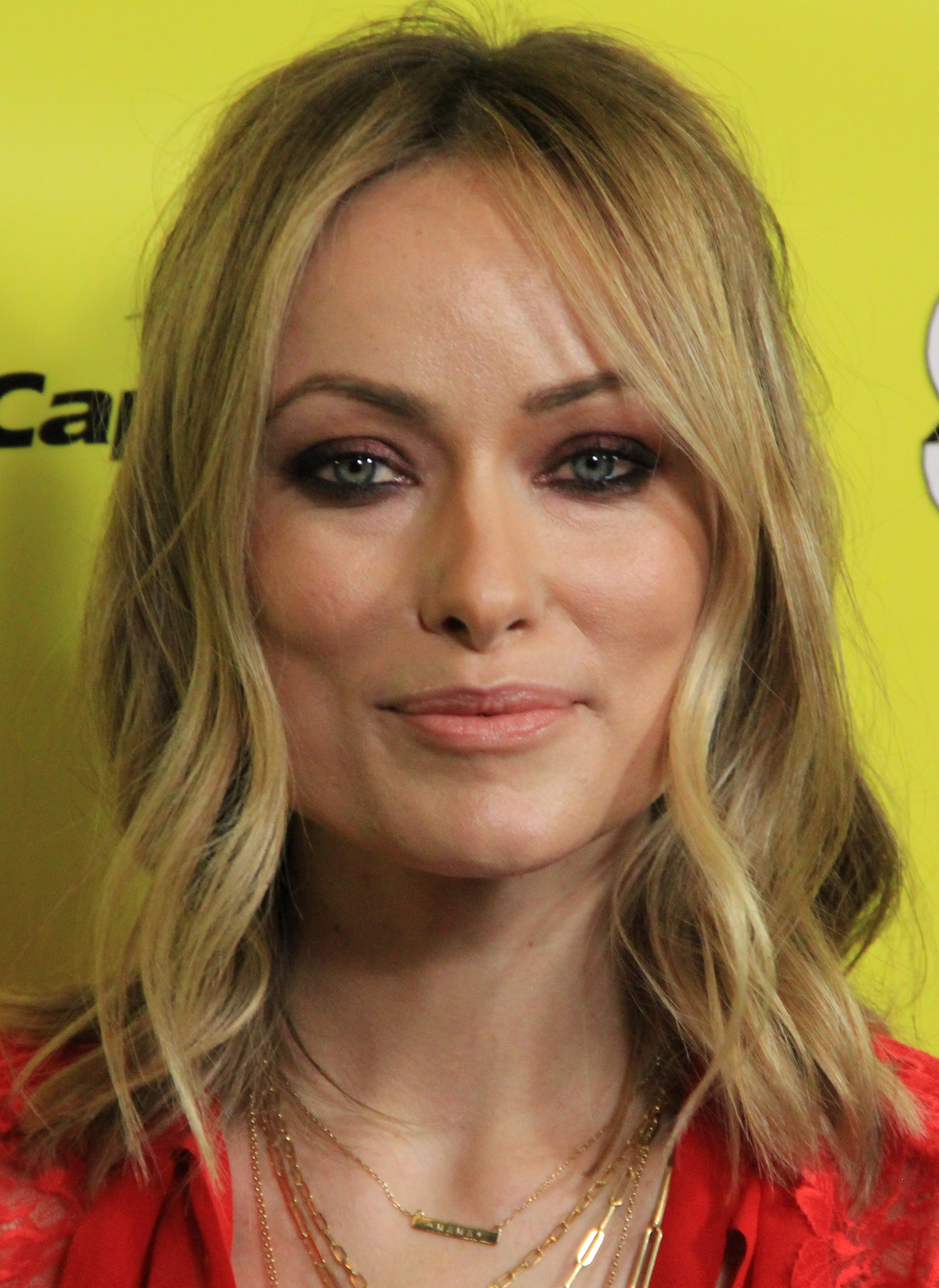
left to right: Eva Longoria, Zoe Saldaña, and Olivia Wilde directed in 2011

In 2011, the project was sponsored by Clarisonic and Freestyle. The directors were Eva Longoria, Zoe Saldaña, and Olivia Wilde. Eva Longoria directed A Proper Send-Off and Olivia Wilde directed Free Hugs. Saldaña cast Malin Åkerman and Bradley Cooper in her short, which was entitled "Kaylien". Other volunteer actors include Aziz Ansari, Jaclyn Jonet, and Justin Long. The shorts, that fall under the year's theme of empowering women to feel beautiful, will open on October 24 at the Director's Guild Theater and be available on glamourreelmoments.com the following day.

=== Reel Music ===
In 2006, Reel Music was spun out of the program as an effort to get women involved in directing music videos. After Pink directed a video in 2006 (that debuted in January 2007), Ciara directed one in 2007.

=== Resulting directorial work ===
As noted above, 2005 participant Talia Lugacy directed the 2007 film Descent starring Rosario Dawson. In 2011, Reel Moments alums Jennifer Aniston (2006) and Demi Moore (2008) joined Patty Jenkins, Alicia Keys, and Penelope Spheeris in directing the Lifetime comedy-drama television film Five.

== List of directors ==
- 2005: Jenny Bicks, Lisa Leone, Talia Lugacy, Gwyneth Paltrow, Trudie Styler, and Mary Wigmore
- 2006: Jennifer Aniston, Andrea Buchanan, Bryce Dallas Howard, and Carol Leifer
- 2007: Kirsten Dunst, Kate Hudson, and Rita Wilson
- 2008: Courteney Cox, Demi Moore, and Kirsten "Kiwi" Smith
- 2010: Jessica Biel, Eva Mendes, and Rachel Weisz
- 2011: Eva Longoria, Zoe Saldaña, and Olivia Wilde
