= MotorSport (song) =

2017 single by Migos, Nicki Minaj and Cardi B

Single by Migos, Nicki Minaj and Cardi B

from the album Culture II
- Released: October 27, 2017
- Recorded: 2017
- Studio: Quad Recording Studios (New York); Offset Mansion (Atlanta); Chalice Recording Studios (Los Angeles); Fried Music (Helsinki); Hit Factory Criteria (Miami)
- Genre: Hip-hop; trap
- Length: 5:03 (album version/radio edit); 5:24 (original version)
- Label: Quality Control; Capitol; Motown
- Songwriters: Quavious Marshall; Kiari Cephus; Kirshnik Ball; Belcalis Almanzar; Onika Maraj; Shane Lindstrom; Tim Gomringer; Kevin Gomringer
- Producers: Murda Beatz; Cubeatz

Migos singles chronology
| "I Get the Bag" (2017) | "MotorSport" (2017) | "Stir Fry" (2017) |

Nicki Minaj singles chronology
| "You Already Know" (2017) | "MotorSport" (2017) | "The Way Life Goes (Remix)" (2017) |

Cardi B singles chronology
| "No Limit" (2017) | "MotorSport" (2017) | "La Modelo" (2017) |

Music video
- "Motorsport" on YouTube

"MotorSport" is a song by the American hip-hop trio Migos, Trinidadian rapper Nicki Minaj, and American rapper Cardi B. Written alongside Murda Beatz and Cubeatz, it was released on October 27, 2017, as the lead single from the trio's third album Culture II (2018). It reached number six on the US Billboard Hot 100, becoming Migos' second top 10 in the country.

== Background and release ==
"MotorSport" marks the first time Migos, Minaj, and Cardi B have worked together on a song; although Offset had already collaborated with Minaj on London on da Track's "No Flag", and with Cardi B (his wife at the time) on her own track "Lick". On October 25, 2017, radio station Hot 93.7 confirmed that a collaboration between Migos, Minaj, and Cardi B would be released two days later. On October 26, the night before its release, Migos previewed the track on Power 105.1's music celebration, Powerhouse. On October 27, the song premiered online and was released worldwide as a download. Soon after it was released, Joe Budden from Everyday Struggle speculated that Ye was originally on the song and that he's the one who actually pitched the idea of getting Minaj on it.

It was also rumored that Cardi B and Minaj were dissing each other on the song in the midst of an alleged feud between the two, which both rappers denied. Minaj commented on the rumors saying that the song was originally only a collaboration between her and Quavo, that she was "in full support of Cardi B's 'MotorSport' feature" and that "the conspiracy theorists are just so tired", while Cardi B said that "people wouldn't be satisfied even if [we] was making out" and "I don't really have the time".

== Composition ==
The song references celebrities such as Criss Angel, Bill Belichick, Boosie, Jackie Chan, Yo Gotti, Selena, Britney Spears, Vince Lombardi, Mike Tyson, Lucy and Ricky Ricardo and Lil Uzi Vert; and brands such as Bugatti, Chanel, Givenchy, Lamborghini, McDonald's, Xanax, Percocet, Porsche, Richard Mille, Patek Philippe, Audemars Piguet and Saks, among others. Cardi B also references Daddy Yankee's 2004 song "Gasolina".

== Critical reception ==
Nicki and Cardi's verses received positive reviews. Editors from Billboard noted Cardi B's line "trap Selena" as an "ambitious statement." Minaj's verse on the song was listed by Angel Diaz of Complex as the "Best Rap Verse of the Month" of October 2017. For another Complex writer, both rappers have "standout moments." Cardi B's verse won Best Featured Verse at the 2018 BET Hip Hop Awards.

== Music video ==
Directed by Migos member Quavo and directors Bradley & Pablo, the music video was released on December 6, 2017, on Apple Music. It was made available on YouTube the next day.

== Commercial performance ==
The song reached number six on the US Billboard Hot 100, becoming Migos' second top 10 in the country. Cardi B won a BET Hip Hop Award for Best Featured Verse for the song, even though she is credited as a lead artist on it. It was also nominated for a BET Award for Viewers' Choice.

== Live performance ==
Cardi B included "MotorSport" on her medley performance at the 2018 iHeartRadio Music Awards. She also performed the song as a special guest on the Aubrey & the Three Migos Tour on August 25, 2018.

Minaj performed the song during her Rolling Loud festival performance on May 13, 2018, in Miami.

== Track listing ==
Digital download
| No. | Title | Length |
|---|---|---|
| 1. | "MotorSport" | 5:24 |

- 7-inch vinyl
1. "MotorSport"
2. "MotorSport" (instrumental)

== Charts ==
=== Weekly charts ===
| Chart (2017–2018) | Peak position |
|---|---|
| Australia (ARIA) | 73 |
| Canada Hot 100 (Billboard) | 12 |
| Czech Republic Singles Digital (ČNS IFPI) | 64 |
| France (SNEP) | 73 |
| Hungary (Stream Top 40) | 40 |
| Greece International (IFPI) | 11 |
| Ireland (IRMA) | 79 |
| Latvia (DigiTop100) | 49 |
| Netherlands (Single Tip) | 4 |
| New Zealand Heatseekers (RMNZ) | 2 |
| Philippines (Philippine Hot 100) | 80 |
| Portugal (AFP) | 57 |
| Slovakia Singles Digital (ČNS IFPI) | 46 |
| Sweden Heatseeker (Sverigetopplistan) | 4 |
| Switzerland (Schweizer Hitparade) | 54 |
| UK Singles (Official Charts) | 49 |
| UK Hip Hop/R&B (Official Charts) | 23 |
| US Billboard Hot 100 | 6 |
| US Hot R&B/Hip-Hop Songs (Billboard) | 3 |
| US Rhythmic Airplay (Billboard) | 6 |

=== Year-end charts ===
| Chart (2018) | Position |
|---|---|
| Canada (Canadian Hot 100) | 63 |
| US Billboard Hot 100 | 34 |
| US R&B/Hip-Hop Songs (Billboard) | 16 |
| US Rhythmic (Billboard) | 30 |

== Certifications ==
| Region | Certification | Certified units/sales |
|---|---|---|
| Australia (ARIA) | Platinum | 70,000^{‡} |
| Brazil (Pro-Música Brasil) | Platinum | 60,000^{‡} |
| Canada (Music Canada) | 3× Platinum | 240,000^{‡} |
| Denmark (IFPI Danmark) | Gold | 45,000^{‡} |
| France (SNEP) | Gold | 100,000^{‡} |
| Italy (FIMI) | Gold | 25,000^{‡} |
| New Zealand (RMNZ) | Platinum | 30,000^{‡} |
| United Kingdom (BPI) | Platinum | 600,000^{‡} |
| United States (RIAA) | 6× Platinum | 6,000,000^{‡} |
^{‡} Sales+streaming figures based on certification alone.

== Release history ==
| Region | Date | Format | Label | Ref. |
|---|---|---|---|---|
| Various | October 27, 2017 | Digital download | Quality Control Music; Capitol; Motown | |
| United Kingdom | November 10, 2017 | Rhythmic Contemporary radio | Quality Control Music; Capitol; Motown | |
