= The Geography of Girlhood =

2006 novel by Kirsten Smith

- Author: Kirsten Smith
- Language: English
- Genre: Coming-of-age
- Publisher: Little, Brown and Company
- Publication date: 2006
- Publication place: United States
- Media type: Print
- Pages: 184
- ISBN: 0316160210
- OCLC: 64179036
- Dewey Decimal: 813.6
- LC Class: PS3619.M5894

The Geography of Girlhood is a coming of age novel written in verse by American writer Kirsten Smith, published by Little, Brown and Company in 2006. The novel follows Penny Morrow, a fourteen-year-old with a missing mother, a wild older sister, a protective younger stepbrother and one severe crush on absolutely the wrong guy. To make matters worse, Penny's trapped in a small town in the Pacific Northwest, where "nothing ever happens / and if it does / all the things with wings / fly away."

== Reception ==
Booklist's Cindy Dobrez called the novel "powerful" and highlighted how "the geography metaphor and wanderlust theme successfully connect the poems, some of which were published previously in literary journals".

According to School Library Journal's Renee Steinberg, The Geography of Girlhood provides "a penetrating portrait of growing up female" through Penny's "memorable" voice, which offers "clarity", "keen understanding", and "apt metaphors".

Kirkus Reviews focused on the development of the main character: "Penny’s transformation from shy little sister to mature teenager is gratifying, and readers will be enormously satisfied that Penny has grown from ditz to balanced young woman, ready to handle the challenges of adulthood."
