= Bill Wackermann =

American executive and author

William Wackermann is a media executive, author and the founder of Wackermann & Partners, a celebrity public relations agency based in New York and Los Angeles. He is also the former chief executive officer of Wilhelmina International Inc. (Wilhelmina Models) in New York City. Before joining Wilhelmina, Wackermann held the position of executive vice president at Conde Nast.

== Career ==
Wackermann started his career in sales and marketing, working at Condé Nast for over 20 years. Wackermann remains the youngest executive vice president in the company's history holding positions of senior vice president and publishing director of the print and digital divisions including Brides, Details, Bon Appétit, Glamour, Domino and W. During his tenure, Wackermann led Glamour Magazine to receive The National Magazine Awards 2010 Magazine of the Year. While overseeing Glamour, Wackermann co-created Glamour Reel Moments, a film series focused on women's empowerment with all female directors including Jennifer Aniston, Demi Moore, Jessica Biel, Olivia Wilde and Rachel Weisz. In 2002, he was named Magazine Publisher of the Year by The Delaney Report.

In 2012, Wackermann wrote Flip the Script: How to Turn the Tables and Win in Business and Life which was published by Simon & Schuster's Free Press imprint. Publishers Weekly called it "a sugar-coated pep talk", continuing, "Sprinkled among platitudes about developing self-belief and displaying solid leadership qualities, Wackermann shares stories of colleagues and his own working-class beginnings, giving the book the feeling of an interview transcription rather than something more practical or utilitarian. [...] This falls short of being a substantive guide and ends up serving as the story of the author's own achievements."

Wackermann became chief executive officer of Wilhelmina Models in 2016. He subsequently founded the company's creative agency, Wilhelmina Studio and signed various artists to the company including Nicki Minaj, Kacy Hill, Leona Lewis, Shawn Mendes, Dustin Lance Black, Machine Gun Kelly, Niall Horan, Maren Morris, and Hopper Penn.

Under Wackermann's leadership, Wilhelmina streamlined and restructured its operations, achieving record revenue.

After four years as CEO of Wilhelmina, Wackermann did not renew his contract.

== Personal life ==
Wackermann holds a B.A. in English from Villanova University
