= Left Neglected =

2011 novel by Lisa Genova

- First edition
- Author: Lisa Genova
- Language: English
- Genre: Fiction
- Published: 2011 by Gallery Books
- Publication place: United States
- Media type: Print
- Pages: 327 pp
- ISBN: 978-1-4391-6463-1
- OCLC: 555641633
- Dewey Decimal: 813.6
- LC Class: PS3607.E55

Left Neglected is a 2011 novel by Lisa Genova, a neuroscientist. It is the author's second novel.

Heller McAlpin of the San Francisco Chronicle stated that Left Neglected "is about tending to neglected areas and healing rifts - familial and emotional as well as neurological."

== Story ==
The novel focuses on 37-year-old Sarah Nickerson who gets into a car accident and receives left neglect, a condition which results from damage to the right hemisphere of the brain. The first quarter of the novel occurs before the brain damage, while the remainder takes place after the brain damage. Prior to the accident Sarah has a busy work and personal life, and this portion of the novel documents her daily routine. Later, Sarah gets into an accident while looking through the contacts on her cell phone while driving. After the accident she learns to live with her condition. Sarah realizes she had previously neglected aspects of her life, and she tries to pay greater attention to them, hence the double meaning of the book's title, "left neglected". Sarah asks her husband to quit his job and the two move to a weekend house in Vermont while navigating their new lifestyle and careers.

Craig Wilson of the USA Today characterized the ending as "a bit of a happy ending, or at least a things-are-getting-better ending."

The novel criticizes consumerism in the suburban lifestyle and the overwork that is often necessary to get the consumerism, since they result in neglect in personal life.

== Characters ==
- Sarah Nickerson - The main character and a resident of Welmont, a fictional Boston suburb
- Bob Nickerson - Sarah's husband, Bob works at a startup company
- Charlie Nickerson - Sarah's seven-year-old son
- Lucy Nickerson - Sarah's five/six-year-old daughter
- Linus Nickerson - Sarah's nine-month-old baby
- Sarah's mother - Sarah is estranged from her mother prior to the accident, and she believed her mother had neglected her after the death of Sarah's brother Nate. After the accident Sarah's mother comes to take care of her and lives with her.

== Reception ==
Jessica Treadway of The Boston Globe wrote that Left Neglected "is a novel worth reading for the way it informs a little-known medical condition, as well as the engaging story of a character who transcends what could have been a tragedy to find a fresh appreciation for life." Treadway argued that some elements of the plot may be, for certain readers, "a bit too neat."

Carla Lucchetta of The Globe and Mail concluded that Genova successfully depicted left side neglect. Lucchetta wrote that the story has some clichés and that it lacked the "vital and immediate" feeling in Still Alice.

Heller McAlpin wrote that the story is "engaging, sympathetic - if not particularly subtle".

USA Today's Craig Wilson argued that "This is a well-told tale from a keen medical mind."

Publishers Weekly stated that compared to Still Alice, Left Neglected is more accessible.
