= Roskamp Institute =

US research institute

The Roskamp Institute
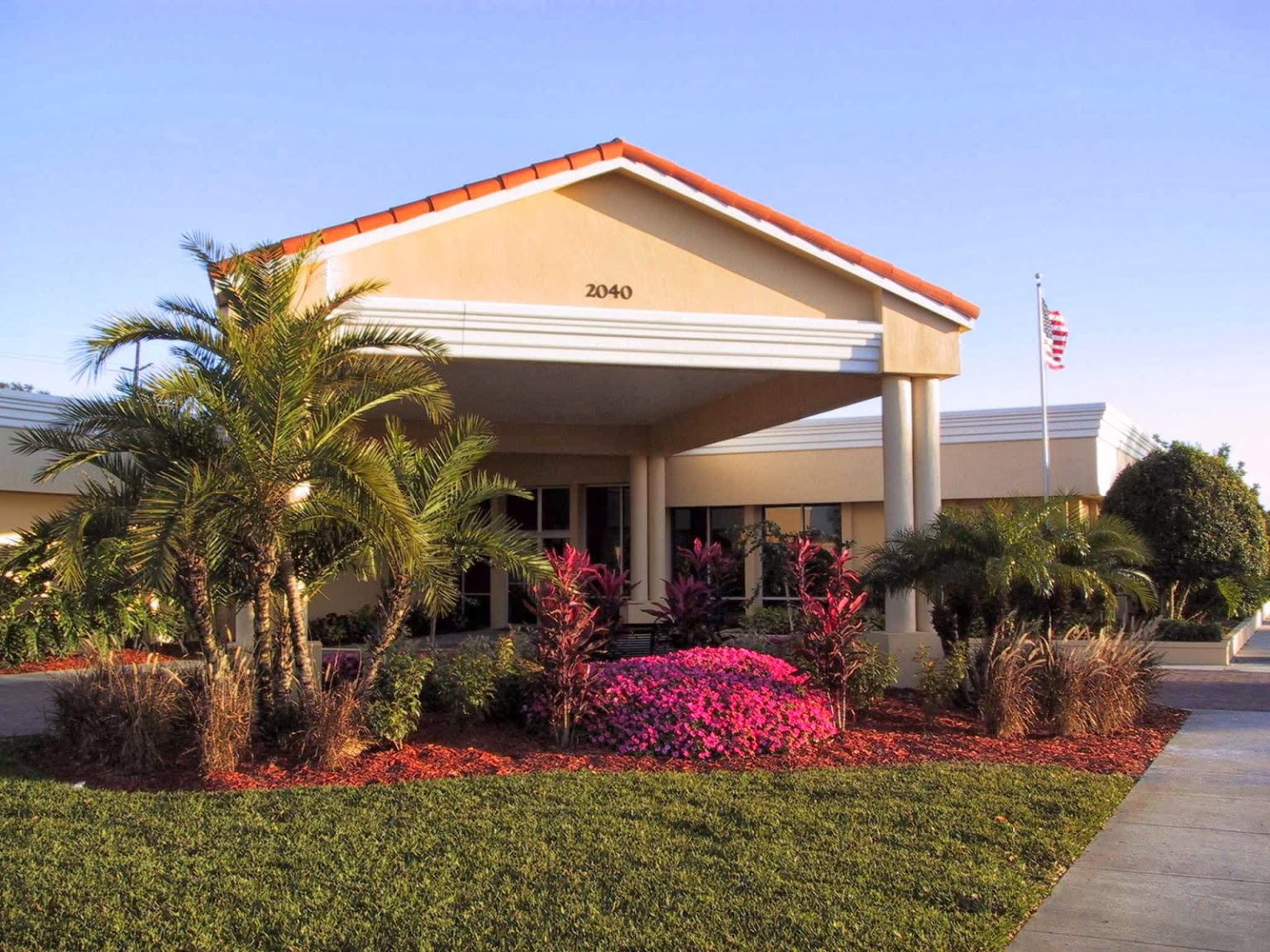
- The Roskamp Institute Headquarters in Sarasota, Florida
- Type: Nonprofit
- Industry: Biotechnology
- Founded: 2003; 23 years ago
- Founders: Michael Mullan; Fiona Crawford
- Headquarters: Sarasota, Florida, United States
- Area served: Worldwide
- Website: roskampinstitute.org

The Roskamp Institute, was co-founded by Robert and Diane Roskamp, and Fiona Crawford and Michael Mullan in Sarasota, Florida in 2003. It is a nonprofit biomedical research facility specializing neurological research including Alzheimer's disease, traumatic brain injury, Gulf War syndrome, and posttraumatic stress disorder. It also operates an onsite neurology clinic. The institute is focused on finding the causes and treatments for neuropsychiatric and neurodegenerative diseases.

The institute's lead researchers, Michael Mullan and Fiona Crawford, were members of a team of scientists who discovered the first genetic errors causing Alzheimer's disease in 1991 in the APP gene in early onset familial cases. Mullan and Crawford also discovered the Swedish mutation which has been incorporated into transgenic mice which are widely used to understand the disease and test new treatments.

The institute is particularly focused on translational research that can lead to novel drug or other therapeutic interventions in neurodegenerative disorders. In this regard, Institute scientists discovered that certain members of a class of drugs called dihydropyridines [DHPs] can lower the levels of amyloid beta in the brains of transgenic models of the disease and decided to take one of them, nilvadipine, forward into clinical trials for Alzheimer's disease. This work was conducted by Archer Pharmaceuticals, a for-profit spin off of the institute, headed by Mullan. In partnership with colleagues at Trinity College, Dublin led by Brian Lawlor, Archer and Institute scientists conducted an open label phase I/II trial of nilvadipine in mild to moderate Alzheimer's disease subjects. More recently, in collaboration with multiple partners at academic institutes in Europe, and again led by Lawlor, Archer and Roskamp Institute scientists partnered to conduct a phase III clinical trial of nilvadipine in mild to moderate Alzheimer's disease.

The institute is currently housed in a 41,000 sq ft (3,800 m^{2}) scientific research facility in Sarasota, Florida. The institute facility contains mass spectrometry, pathology, microscopy, certified GMO testing, and chemistry labs. The organization employs more than 50 scientists, technicians, clinicians, and other research staff.
