= Duncan Heath =

British talent agent

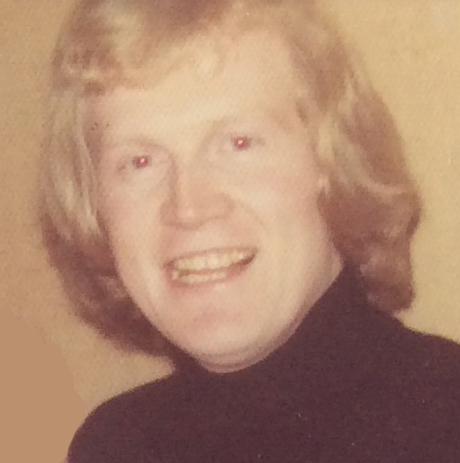
- Heath in around 1977
- Born: Barrie Duncan Heath; June 1946 (age 80); United Kingdom
- Spouses: Hilary Heath (m. 1974; div. 1989); Lex Lutzus (m. 2013)
- Children: 4

Duncan Heath (born June 1946) is a British talent agent, producer, and the founder and chairman of Independent Talent Group, Europe's largest talent and literary agency, based in London. His clients include many leading figures in the British film industry, including Anthony Hopkins, Michael Caine, Maggie Smith, Ian McShane, Steve Coogan, Tom Hooper, Sam Mendes, Jonathan Glazer and Mike Newell.

== Early life ==
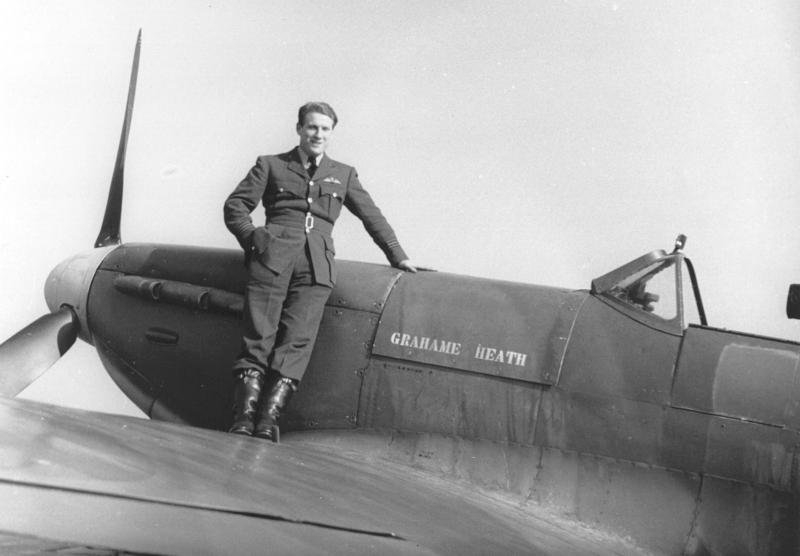
Duncan Heath's father, Barrie Heath, poses on the wing of his Spitfire during the Battle of Britain, 1940.

Heath was born in June 1946, the son of Sir Barrie Heath (1916–1988), a decorated former Battle of Britain Spitfire pilot and later chairman of the industrial conglomerate GKN. Their relationship was not always cordial, and Heath later recalled that his father disapproved of him entering the entertainment industry, adding that he "wanted me to go work in some dark Satanic mill somewhere".

== Career ==
Contrary to his father's wishes, he began his career in advertising, and, in 1971, joined the William Morris Agency in London as a runner, beginning at the very bottom of the industry. After less than a year, he had been fired for behaviour he later described as "insolence and mild violence".

In a later interview with Industrial Scripts, Heath elaborated on his dismissal from the William Morris Agency, saying:

"Certainly insolence, and more than mild violence. The managing director was one of these people who snapped, and eventually I lost it. I also pretended to be an agent when I wasn't. I was actually in charge of photographs."

— Duncan Heath, https://industrialscripts.com/duncan-heath/

=== Duncan Heath Associates ===
In 1973, he and his then-wife-to-be Hilary Dwyer founded the talent agency Duncan Heath Associates. In an interview with the Financial Times in 2002, Heath said "she introduced me to a lot of people - if it wasn't for her, it wouldn't have happened." He found the money to start the business by betting the remains of his wages from William Morris on a horse that his mother had running at Newbury. The horse came in at 35:1 and Heath found himself with £3,500, a sum he described as "a shitload of money in the 1970s". He bought a fifty per cent stake in a company owned and run by Christopher Long, a former ICM agent, though at first business was slow. "We spent most of our time hanging around theatres asking actors if they wanted an agent. Most of the time they just told you to fuck off."

Duncan Heath Associates was sold to the US-based talent agency International Creative Management (ICM) in 1985. In 1991, Duncan Heath Associates merged with ICM London, and Heath became chairman of the merged company.

=== Independent Talent Group ===
In 2002, he led a management buyout from ICM, returning the group to independence. In August 2007, at the Venice Film Festival, he announced that ICM UK would be renamed Independent Talent Group, of which he is chairman. His clients include Anthony Hopkins, Michael Caine, Maggie Smith, Ian McShane, Steve Coogan, Tom Hooper, Sam Mendes, Jonathan Glazer and Mike Newell.

Independent Talent Group is Europe's largest talent and literary agency, representing many of Britain's leading actors, writers, producers & directors. Its clients include Daniel Craig, Rachel Weisz, Jodie Comer, Josh O'Connor, Gemma Arterton, Lennie James, Claire Foy, Kit Connor, Thandiwe Newton, and Jonathan Glazer.

Heath is credited with thanks on nine films: Buster (1988), The Krays (1990), Onegin (1999), The Libertine (2005), Churchill: The Hollywood Years (2004), A Cock and Bull Story (2005), Still Alice (2014), The Danish Girl (2015), and Stan and Ollie (2018).

In 2000, he was a jury member for the British Independent Film Awards

Heath is credited as executive producer on five films: 2020: The Story of Us (2021), Last Song from Kabul (2023), Rainbow Warrior (2023), Klitschko: More Than a Fight (2024), and Death Without Mercy (2024).

== Family life ==
Heath married actress Hilary Dwyer in 1974, although they were divorced in 1989. They have two children, Daniel and Laura. Laura Heath founded and runs the Hope-Martin Animal Foundation in Barbados.

Heath's second wife was film producer Lex Lutzus, with whom he has two children, Jacob and Edie Heath. They have since divorced.
