= Kevin Kain =

Kevin Kain is a tropical disease expert based at the Toronto General Hospital, at which he serves as Director of the Centre for Travel and Tropical Medicine. He is a Professor of Medicine, University of Toronto, the Director of the Sandra A. Rotman Labs at the Sandra Rotman Centre, and holds a Canada Research Chair in Molecular Parasitology.

Kain's sister is the ballerina Karen Kain.

== Selected publications ==
- KC Kain, MA Harrington, S Tennyson, JS Keystone, 1998, Imported malaria: prospective analysis of problems in diagnosis and management, Clinical Infectious Diseases 1998;27:142–9 article
- ET Ryan, KC Kain, 2000, Health Advice and Immunizations for Travelers, New England Journal of Medicine, Volume 342(23):1716-1725, June 8, 2000. extract
- KC Kain, DW MacPherson, T Kelton, JS Keystone, et al., 2001, Malaria deaths in visitors to Canada and in Canadian travellers: a case series, Canadian Medical Association Journal, March 6, 2001; 164 (5) abstract
- ET Ryan, ME Wilson, KC Kain, 2002, Illness After International Travel, New England Journal of Medicine, 347(7):505-516 August 15, 2002.

He has two sons Dylan and Taylor Kain.

== Sources ==
"Current Medical Perspectives". University of Toronto Medical Journal (UTMJ). Issue 3 1983. p176. https://web.archive.org/web/20061013214849/http://www.utmj.org/issues/82.3/Current_Medical_Perspectives__82-3-176.pdf -
