= Lisa Genova =

American female literary fiction writer

- Born: November 22, 1970 (age 55)
- Education: Bates College (BS); Harvard University (PhD)
- Occupations: Novelist; neuroscientist
- Children: 3
- Writing career
- Period: 2007–present
- Genre: Literary fiction
- Notable work: Still Alice (2007)
- Website: lisagenova.com

Lisa Genova (born November 22, 1970) is an American neuroscientist and author. She self-published her debut novel, Still Alice (2007), about a Harvard University professor who suffers early-onset Alzheimer's disease. The book was adapted into a 2014 film with the same title, which won the Academy Award for Best Actress for Julianne Moore's performance as Alice Howland.

Genova has written fiction about characters dealing with neurological disorders. Gallery Books published her next three novels, Left Neglected, Love Anthony, and Inside the O'Briens, all New York Times bestsellers.

== Life and science career ==
Genova graduated valedictorian, summa cum laude, Phi Beta Kappa from Bates College with a Bachelor of Science degree in biopsychology, and in 1998 she received a PhD in neuroscience from Harvard University.

She did research at Massachusetts General Hospital East, Yale Medical School, McLean Hospital, and the National Institutes of Health. Genova taught neuroanatomy at Harvard Medical School in fall 1996.

== Literary and related career ==
=== Still Alice ===
Her first novel was Still Alice (2007), about a woman who suffers early-onset Alzheimer's disease. The central character, Alice Howland, is a 50-year-old cognitive psychology professor at Harvard and a world-renowned linguistics expert. She is married to an equally successful husband, with whom she has three grown children. The disease takes hold swiftly, and it changes Alice's relationship with her family and the world.

Genova self-published the book in 2007 with iUniverse.

The book was later acquired by Simon & Schuster and published in January 2009 by Pocket Books (now Gallery Books). It was on The New York Times best seller list for more than 59 weeks. As of 2012, there were more than a million copies in print, and it had been translated into 26 languages.

The book was later adapted for the stage by Christine Mary Dunford for the Lookingglass Theatre Company in Chicago. The play was produced from April 10 – May 19, 2013.

Neon Park Productions and Killer Films produced a film adaptation of Still Alice in 2014, starring Julianne Moore as Alice, and co-starring Alec Baldwin, Kristen Stewart, and Kate Bosworth. Moore won an Academy Award for Best Actress at the 87th Academy Awards for her role.

=== Left Neglected ===
Left Neglected (2011) tells the story of a woman who has left neglect (also called hemispatial or unilateral neglect), caused by a traumatic brain injury. As she struggles to recover, she learns that she must embrace a simpler life. She begins to heal when she attends to elements left neglected in herself, her family, and the world around her. It was a New York Times bestseller, the No. 1 Indie Next Pick for January 2011, the Borders "Book You’ll Love" for January 2011, and the No. 4 Indie Reading Group Pick for summer 2011. Left Neglected was chosen by the Richard & Judy Book Club in the UK.

=== Love Anthony ===
Love Anthony, her third New York Times bestseller, was published by Gallery Books in September 2012. The main character is Anthony, a nonverbal boy with autism. This story goes inside the mind of autism and how Anthony affects two women. It spent one week on the New York Times hardcover best-seller list.

=== Inside the O'Briens ===
Inside the O'Briens was published by Gallery Books in April 2015. It focuses on members of the O'Brien family, several of whom have inherited Huntington's disease, and how the disease affects their lives and relationships. It was nominated for the Goodreads Choice Award for fiction in 2015. It was a No. 1 hardcover fiction title in Canada and a New York Times bestseller.

=== Every Note Played ===
Every Note Played is Genova's fifth novel and was released in March 2018. It follows the main character, a pianist by trade, as he discovers and lives with a diagnosis of ALS.

=== More or Less Maddy ===
More or Less Maddy is Genova's sixth novel and was released in January 2025. It follows the main character, a stand-up comedian, as she deals with her diagnosis of bipolar disorder.

=== Non-fiction ===
- Remember: The Science of Memory and the Art of Forgetting, 2021; published by Penguin Random House. New York Times bestseller.

=== Audiobooks ===
- 2009: Still Alice (Audible, read by Lisa Genova)
- 2015: Inside the O'Briens (Audible read by Skipp Suddwith)
- 2018: Every Note Played (Audible, afterword read by Lisa Genova)
- 2021: Remember: The Science of Memory and the Art of Forgetting (Audible, read by Lisa Genova )

== Awards and honors ==
On April 23, 2015, it was announced that Genova would receive the third annual Pell Center Prize for Story in the Public Square, an award "recognizing a contemporary storyteller whose work has had a significant impact on the public dialogue". The award is bestowed by the Pell Center for International Relations and Public Policy at Salve Regina University.

Genova was also awarded with the Sargent and Eunice Shriver Profiles in Dignity Award, which recognizes individuals whose actions have promoted greater understanding of Alzheimer's and its effects on diagnosed individuals, families and caregivers. She received the Abe Burrows Entertainment Award for the film Still Alice, Global Genes - Fourth Annual RARE Champions of Hope Award, Bates College Sesquicentennial Award and the American College of Neuropsychopharmacology Media Award for Informing the Public about Treatment and Ongoing Research in Medical Illness.

The Alzheimer's Association awarded Genova the Rita Hayworth Award on May 7, 2016.

Genova was awarded an honorary degree from Bates College, in Lewiston, Maine, on May 29, 2016.

== Personal life ==
Genova was married and had a daughter in 2000. She started writing full-time in 2004, following her divorce.
