= Love Anthony =

2012 novel by Lisa Genova

- First edition cover
- Author: Lisa Genova
- Publisher: Gallery Books
- Publication date: 2012

Love Anthony is a novel by American writer Lisa Genova. The hardcover was released in September 2012 and the paperback was released in April 2013 to coincide with Autism Awareness Month. Set in Nantucket, Massachusetts, Love Anthony is a story about a mother dealing with the death of her son, who was diagnosed with autism at age three, and ultimately, finding the courage to start over.

== Plot ==
Love Anthony follows Olivia Donatelli, a former book editor and mother, whose son Anthony, was diagnosed with autism at age three. When Olivia was finally coming to terms with daily life involving a son with autism, Anthony dies. Afterwards, a grieving Olivia separates from her husband and moves to their summer cottage in Nantucket, hoping to remove herself from her old life and make sense of Anthony's death. Inspired by her surroundings, she starts a photography business for some extra cash and begins to read over the journals she kept while Anthony was growing up.

Also living in Nantucket is Beth Ellis, Olivia's neighbor who recently found out that her husband has been having an affair. As a way to cope, a devastated Beth begins to write a novel. Eventually, the two women meet when Beth hires Olivia to take family portraits of her and her daughters at the beach. In passing, Beth mentions that she's writing a book, and Olivia offers to help her edit it.

Eventually, Beth finishes her book – a story about a boy with autism named Anthony. Despite Olivia's initial disbelief, it helps her begin to accept Anthony's death. Similarly, after writing the book, Beth begins to come to terms with her husband's infidelity and starts thinking of ways to save her marriage. The story ends with Olivia leaving Nantucket, with the intention of going back to work and getting Beth's manuscript published.

== Reception ==
The novel was published in the fall of September 2012 in hardcover. It spent one week on the New York Times hardcover best-seller list and multiple weeks on the ABA IndieBound hardcover fiction list.

The novel received mostly positive reviews from critics. USA Today called it "beautifully written and poignant to the point of heartbreak" and Booklist echoed the sentiment, citing that "writing with deep empathy and insight, Genova has created an engaging story that fearlessly asks the big questions." Kirkus Reviews commented that "there's a point in the narrative where one of the characters becomes so engrossed in reading a book that she loses track of time. Readers of Genova's latest excellent offering might very well find the same happening to them."
