= Life Happens =

- Theatrical release poster
- Directed by: Kat Coiro
- Written by: Kat Coiro; Krysten Ritter
- Produced by: Justin L. Levine
- Starring: Krysten Ritter; Kate Bosworth; Rachel Bilson; Geoff Stults; Justin Kirk; Fallon Goodson; Andrea Savage; Seymour Cassel; Rhys Coiro; Jason Biggs; Kristen Johnston
- Cinematography: Doug Chamberlain
- Edited by: Adam Catino; Eli Nilsen
- Music by: Mateo Messina
- Production companies: Stardust Pictures; Dot Dot Dot Productions
- Distributed by: Lionsgate
- Release dates: June 18, 2011 (LA Film Festival); April 13, 2012 (United States)
- Running time: 100 minutes
- Country: United States
- Language: English
- Budget: $930,000
- Box office: $30,905

Life Happens (stylized as L!fe Happens) is a 2011 American comedy film directed by Kat Coiro and written by Coiro and Krysten Ritter. The film stars Ritter, Kate Bosworth, Kristen Johnston, Geoff Stults, Jason Biggs, and Rachel Bilson. Ritter plays the main character, Kim, who lives with her two roommates, Deena (Bosworth) and Laura (Bilson), in Los Angeles. Kim becomes pregnant after a one-night stand so she turns to her friends for help. Life Happens was released theatrically on April 13, 2012.

== Plot ==
Deena and Kim each bring home a guy one night. Realizing they have no condoms, they go looking around in their house where Kim ultimately finds the last one, but Deena takes it and Kim has unprotected sex. One year later, Kim is a single mother. She still lives with her two girlfriends, Deena and Laura, while trying to juggle her son named Max. She takes Max to his father Mark, but he announces that he is not interested in being a father. Kim brings Max along to work with her one-day, as a dog service company assistant to her youth-obsessed boss Francesca. Francesca reprimands Kim for bringing Max with her and says that she would be fired if she does it again. Kim then takes Max to her grandfather who is currently living in a retirement home.

Meanwhile, Deena tries to finish writing her book in a library and ends up hooking up with a guy. One night, as Kim works as a bouncer in one of Francesca's parties, she falls for a guy named Nicolas who was with two of his friends, Henri and Sergei, attending the party. That night, Francesca finally allows Kim to have a break and meet up with Nicolas who promised to buy her a drink earlier and they spend the night getting to know each other. They quickly form a relationship after Nicolas intently asks Francesca to have Kim take his dog in his house. Kim brings along Max with her yet again where she lies to Nicolas that Max is a child of one of her roommates and that she was just relied on to look after Max. Kim asks Deena to come with her on her date with Nicolas that evening where Deena agrees. Nicholas arrives along with his friend Henri, where they look to Deena as her roommate with the baby. Kim begs Deena to just go with the lie they have come up with where Deena responds that it wouldn't take long enough for them to know that Kim is the one with a baby. They have a double date where it seems that Deena and Henri are attracted to each other, although Henri dresses up in hippie clothing.

The next day, Deena seems promoted from her career as a writer when someone could recognize her from an article she wrote. Kim on the other hand, seems to be an underdog as Francesca wouldn't allow to invest in her own dog service business. Laura, the other roommate seems to be unstable as she has been shifting jobs every week. Kim asks her to take care of Max since she has a date with Nicholas that night, but tells her she can't. She then freaks out and calls Deena who isn't answering her calls. Finally, she asks a young boy to babysit Max for her. Nicolas and Kim have sex after their romantic date, but it is not long before Nicolas discovers Kim's secret when milk leaks out of her breasts. This leaves Nicholas upset and Kim leaves.

On her way home, she sees a paramedic leave and asks Deena what happened. Kim yells at Deena for not returning home early where Deena strikes back at her saying that Max is her responsibility and there is nothing that could excuse her behavior. Deena and Kim's friendship is compromised. Kim spends all day around the house and finally quits her job telling Francesca she never looked 21. The next day, Kim informs Deena that she has to move out of the house and focus her life on being a mother and as for Deena, her successful career. Kim buys a house and visits Mark who regrets everything he said about not being ready and he wants a shot of being a dad for once. Laura then enters a show competition and seems to be successful. Kim finally reconciles with Deena and Nicolas where they all play pool together.

== Cast ==
- Krysten Ritter as Kim
- Kate Bosworth as Deena
- Rachel Bilson as Laura
- Geoff Stults as Nicholas
- Justin Kirk as Henri
- Fallon Goodson as Jayde
- Andrea Savage as Patti
- Kristen Johnston as Francesca
- Rhys Coiro as Marc
- Jason Biggs as Sergei
- Seymour Cassel as Pop Pop
- Louis Silvers as Barry Robert Philips
- Colin Egglesfield as Ivan #1
- Ivan Shaw as Ivan #2
- Jenny Mollen as Rita the Receptionist
- Abby Brammell as Shiva the Yoga Teacher
- Marguerite Moreau as Pauline
- Lauren Conrad as herself
- Katie Morgan as Dr. Katie
- Nic Novicki as Nurse Nic
- Merrin Dungey as Hester
- Laura Silverman as Ms. Crenshaw
- Devan Leos as Billy
- Milana Vayntrub as Tanya
- Jon Heder as Wrong Number Caller
- Brandon Quinn as Hot Jogger #2
- Zachary & Connor Ross as Baby Max
- Johann Urb as Jason

== Production ==
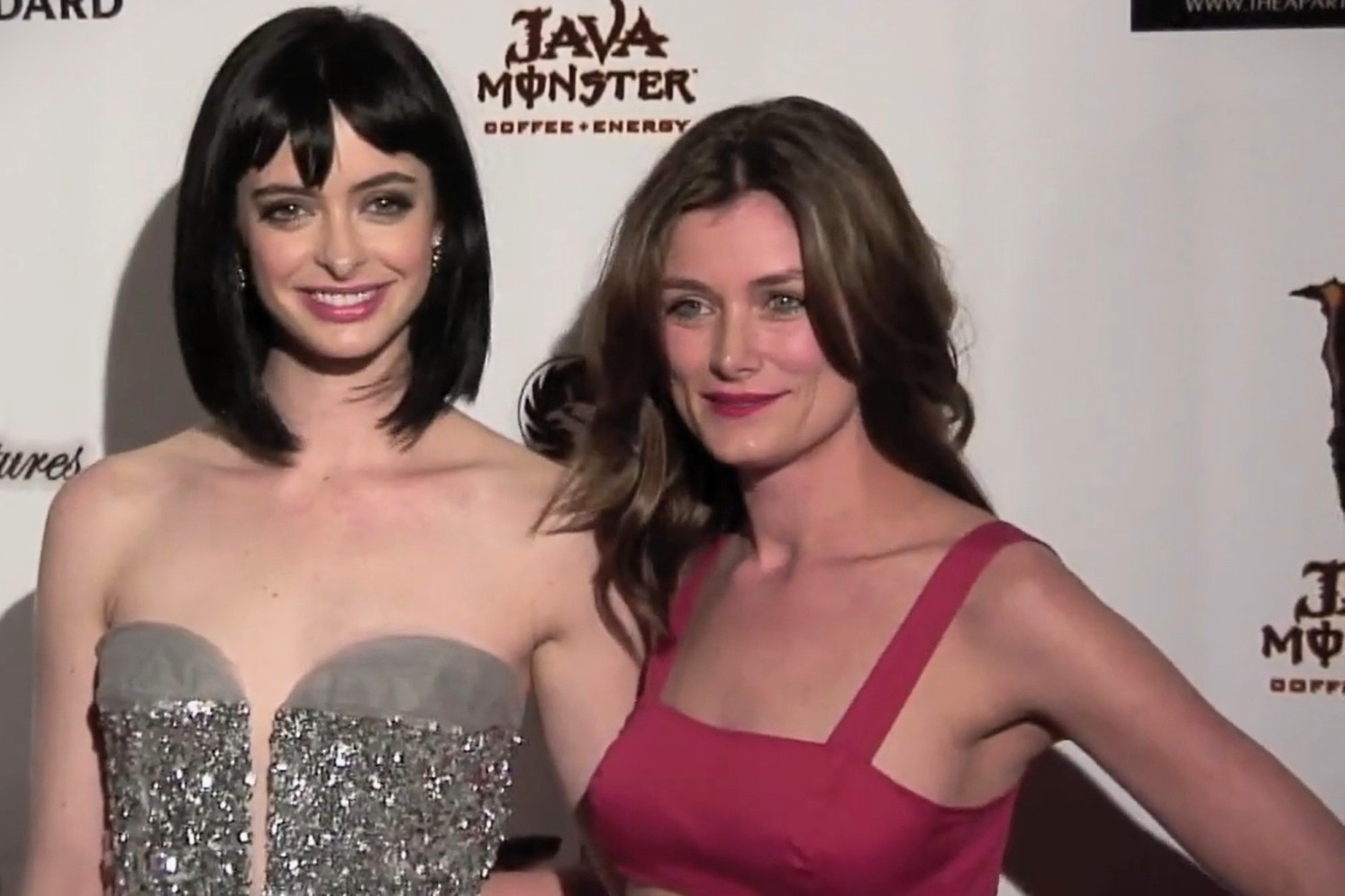
Krysten Ritter and director Kat Coiro of discuss the film in 2010

The working title of the film was BFF & Baby. In an interview, Ritter described how she and Coiro came up with the movie's plot. "Kat and I have been longtime friends. We’re both very psychotically driven, hard-working young women, and we always had this plan to dominate the world, like the two characters in the movie. We started writing and she had a baby, and we had this eureka moment where we just realized that’s the story we wanted to tell, about young girls, figuring out who they are and trying to have it all, but also when you throw a baby in the mix, it creates a whole other set of challenges."

== Soundtrack ==
The soundtrack was arranged by Mateo Messina, who also worked on the music for the film Juno. Ritter, also a singer, contributes a number of songs to the soundtrack.

=== Track listing ===
- "Ridin' Dirty" - Chamillionaire
- "Clementine" - Sarah Jaffe
- "Da Da Da Boom Deeyay" - Mateo Messina
- "Who Let the Dogs Out?"
- "When the Girl Is Lying" - Jordan Galland
- "Get Over It" - Solid Gold
- "Hey Hey" - The Mean
- "I Love the Mall" - Mateo Messina
- "Jump the Moon" - Mateo Messina & Billy Katz
- "Microwebs" - Krysten Ritter
- "My Boyfriend" - Krysten Ritter
- "Rock it" - Little Red
- "Shamma Lamma Ding Dong" - Mateo & The Crunk
- "Sleeping Alone" - 21st Century Girl
- "Softcore" - Dopo Yume and Domino Kirke
- "Three Cold Penguins" - Mateo Messina & Kat Coiro
- "What I Want" - The Mean
- "Wings of Desire" - Aaron Earl Livingston

== Release ==
Life Happens premiered at the Los Angeles Film Festival and was chosen as a selection to the 2012 Tribeca Film Festival.

== Reception ==
On review aggregator website Rotten Tomatoes, the film holds an approval rating of 24%, based on 29 reviews, and an average rating of 4.3/10. On Metacritic, which assigns normalized rating to reviews, the film has a weighted average score of 44 out of 100, based on 16 critics, indicating "mixed or average" reviews.

Richard Roeper of the Chicago Sun-Times called Life Happens "a much milder and more grounded comedy than the recent Bridesmaids, with a smart if somewhat contrived script". Gary Goldstein of the Los Angeles Times said "the film is rarely hijacked by its more familiar themes and sitcom potential. Instead, aided by a nimbly voluble script by Kat Coiro and Ritter, it emerges as an amusing kaleidoscope of contemporary urban angst and romantic aspirations". Justin Lowe of The Hollywood Reporter liked the relationship between the women but thought the "execution dissipate[d] most of the film's potential". Elizabeth Weitzman of The New York Daily News rated the film three out of five stars, noting that the filmmakers "spice up the formula just enough to keep us watching".
