= Mateo Messina =

American composer (born 1972)

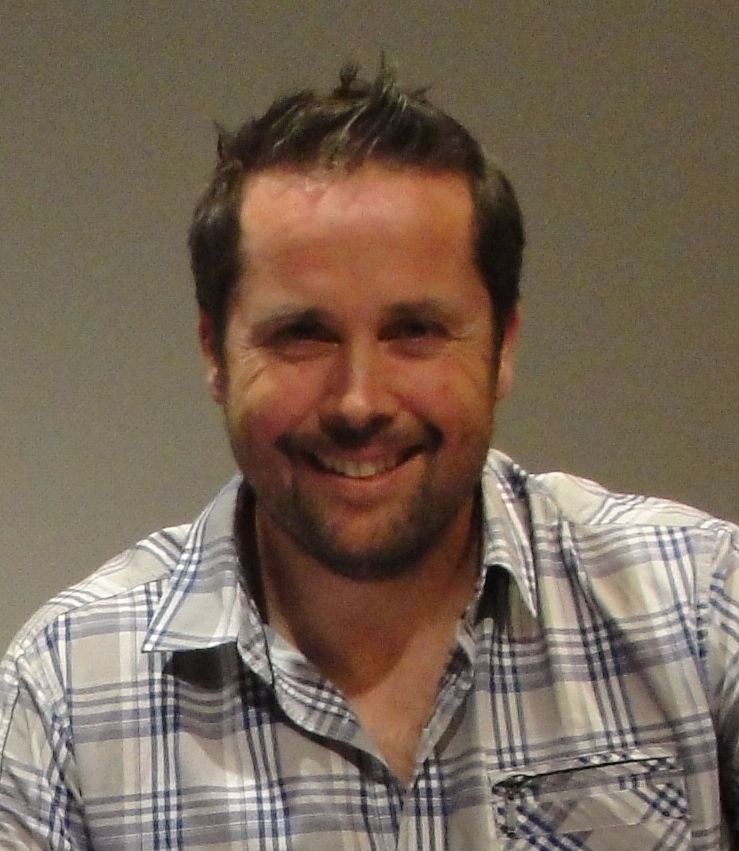

Background information
- Born: 1972 (age 53–54); Seattle, Washington, United States
- Genre: Film score
- Occupation: Composer
- Website: www.mateomessina.com

Mateo Messina is an American composer best known for his soundtrack to the 2007 film Juno. The film won a Grammy Award for Best Compilation Soundtrack Album for Motion Picture, Television, or Other Visual Media.

Messina has written the music for over 30 feature films and over 150 television episodes. in 2026 he directed his first feature film, Reimagined.

== Early life ==
Growing up in Seattle, Messina was drawn to music and started playing piano at the age of three. He began composing early, premiering his first symphony at 25. He’s since written a total of 26 symphonies. He and his team of volunteers, the LUMA Guild, have used these concert premieres to raise money for kids and families going through treatment at Seattle Children's Hospital. Together, they have raised over $2,000,000 to date. He then moved into writing music for film and television.

== Career ==
Messina’s diverse musical styles has been heard in film and on television alike. His provided a folksy, guitar-led score for Jason Reitman’s Juno, contributing to soundtrack album’s Grammy win. He lifted the spirits of the dramedy The Angriest Man in Brooklyn. His turned to funk-flavored music for the dark comedy Butter, and muzak versions of ’90s hits for Young Adult. Messina’s most recent work includes the action comedy Barely Lethal.

Messina is known for his specialization in comedies and coming of age films. He loves writing for inspiring stories.

Messina’s television work includes the comedy series Growing Up Fisher, the high-seas adventure Crossbones, lawyer comedy Fairly Legal, the mini-series Harley and the Davidsons, and the series Perfect Couples. Some of his most popular shows have been NBC's hit Superstore and Hulu's Casual.

== Works ==
Messina also provided source music as well as arranged Sanford and Son Theme for August: Osage County featuring original score by Gustavo Santaolalla. As well, he has written additional music for such hits as Up in the Air, Thank You for Smoking, Young Adult, and NBC's hit, The Office. Also, since the age of 25, Mateo has written, produced, and premiered 26 symphonies. Each premiere has been a benefit concert for families at Seattle Children's Hospital. To date, he and his team have raised over $2,000,000 for these children and their families. His recent works include The Angriest Man in Brooklyn, A Case of You, Butter, Best Man Down, Life Happens, 3,2,1... Frankie Go Boom, And While We Were Here, & The Story of Luke.
