= Swedish mutation =

Genetic cause of early-onset Alzheimer's disease

The Swedish mutation, or familial Alzheimer's disease genetic mutation, is one of the most well known genetic variations that causes early-onset familial Alzheimer's disease. The mutation had important consequences for Alzheimer's disease research. The mutation occurs in the gene which encodes amyloid precursor protein (APP), which is proteolysed into beta amyloid. It results in two neighboring amino-acid changes, K670M and N671L.

== History ==
The mutation was found in 1992 in Florida by Dr. Michael Mullan and Dr. Fiona Crawford working on DNA samples supplied by a group of Swedish researchers led by Dr Lars Lannfelt.

The genetic error causes Alzheimer's disease to develop in the early 50s for the family members who inherit it. On average, about half of the children of someone who carries the mutation will inherit it. The mutation is extremely rare – it has only ever been found in two Swedish families and has never been found in the general population in any other countries.

Beta amyloid is one of the peptides which accumulate in the brains of people with Alzheimer's disease. A great debate had existed between Alzheimer's disease researchers about the relevance of amyloid prior to the 1990s – many scientists believed amyloid was a tombstone of the disease and was not critical to the development of the disease. However, because the only difference between the family members who developed Alzheimer's disease and those that did not in these families was the inheritance of the mutation in the amyloid gene, this suggested that the amyloid protein itself could cause the disease. The idea that amyloid could cause the disease influenced scientific research until this day. Many experimental treatments are directed towards lowering amyloid levels in the brain.

It is thought that the Swedish mutation causes early-onset Alzheimer's disease by beta-secretase cleavage within the secretory pathway.

=== Transgenic mice ===
The other main effect the discovery of the Swedish mutation had was to provide one transgenic mouse model of Alzheimer's disease. Transgenic mice (e.g. Tg2576) were made which overproduce human APP with the Swedish mutation. As a consequence, the mice can develop amyloid plaques at around 13 months old.

The Swedish mutation mice are used to study the effects of amyloid plaques and to develop potential treatments for Alzheimer's disease.

== See also ==
- Early-onset Alzheimer's disease
