= You, Me & Tuscany =

2026 film by Kat Coiro

- Theatrical release poster
- Directed by: Kat Coiro
- Screenplay by: Ryan Engle
- Story by: Ryan Engle; Kristin N. Engle
- Produced by: Will Packer; Johanna Byer
- Starring: Halle Bailey; Regé-Jean Page
- Cinematography: Danny Ruhlmann
- Edited by: Troy Takaki
- Music by: John Debney
- Production company: Will Packer Productions
- Distributed by: Universal Pictures
- Release date: April 10, 2026
- Running time: 105 minutes
- Country: United States
- Language: English
- Budget: $18 million
- Box office: $22.5 million

You, Me & Tuscany is a 2026 American romantic comedy film directed by Kat Coiro, written by Ryan Engle, and starring Halle Bailey and Regé-Jean Page. The film takes place in Italy and tells the story of a young cook who squats in an unoccupied Tuscan villa owned by a man she barely knows and what happens after she meets the owner's brother.

The film was theatrically released in the United States by Universal Pictures on April 10, 2026. It received mixed reviews from critics and grossed $22.5 million, against a production budget of $18 million.

== Plot ==
Anna Montgomery is an aspiring chef who put her dreams on hold after the death of her mother. She works as a house sitter, but has a habit of pretending to live a life that is not hers through her clients’ clothing and homes.

After losing a big client, she meets a handsome Italian man named Matteo Costa and the two have a night of laughter and fun before he invites her back to his room, although Matteo falls asleep while Anna is in the bathroom. Anna scrolls through his photos of his home and sends them to her phone.

The next morning, she awakes to a note from Matteo apologizing for leaving and encouraging her to chase her dreams. She impulsively flies to Tuscany and befriends an eccentric taxi driver named Lorenzo. Upon arrival she discovers that, due to a festival, every hotel is fully booked, and she remembers Matteo's empty villa. Anna walks to the villa and finds the spare key, letting herself in.

The following morning, Anna is awoken by the opera-singing gardener and snoops around the house. She finds an engagement ring in a drawer and is interrupted by Matteo's mother Gabriella and Nonna Alessia. After being caught, Anna pretends that she is Matteo's fiancé to avoid getting arrested.

The family quickly accepts Anna. She meets Matteo's cousin Michael, who she had a run-in with in town the previous day, and develops a mutual attraction to him. Anna grows closer to the family, especially when she helps step in for Matteo's father Vincenzo at his restaurant.

Gabriella insists on showing Anna the vineyard Michael owns and tells her that is where they will marry. On her way to the vineyard, Anna meets Isabella, a childhood friend of both Michael and Matteo, and Matteo's ex-fiancé.

One morning, Anna is awoken by Matteo’s return. He informs Anna that Isabella told him about her, causing his return. They agree that Anna will admit her lies to his family before leaving. They go to the villa where his family lives, prepared to tell them the truth, but Matteo sees how much joy the news of the engagement has brought the family. He quickly decides to continue the ruse.

There is a night of festivities at the family restaurant and Matteo goes out with his boys and Isabella. Anna waits for him at the villa, and tries to end the ruse when he returns, however, they are interrupted by news of Vincenzo being injured.

At the hospital, Michael comforts Anna, and tries to end the budding romance but they are interrupted by the family. Vincenzo is determined still to cook for the final night of the festival, but his family discourages him. Matteo volunteers Anna to be sous chef and she agrees.

The following day, Anna arrives at the restaurant and Michael informs her that Vincenzo is not well, and she will be cooking that evening, reassuring her that the family will help her. When she gets to the kitchen, Anna realizes that Vincenzo didn't follow specific recipes and every night at the restaurant, the menu is different.

In the evening, Anna and her team present a spread of Italian food to Vincenzo, including a special dish inspired by Anna’s mother’s recipe. Vincenzo declares her food excellent and they will name the dish 'Itali-Anna'. When bringing wine to the restaurant, Michael sees Matteo kissing Isabella, although he hides this information and supports Anna through the evening.

The last night of the festival at the restaurant is a success. Anna joins the family in the restaurant and Vincenzo gives a speech. Matteo arrives and announces that he and Anna have decided to return to New York, before leaving abruptly. The family are confused and Michael confronts Matteo over what he saw, leading to a fight between the two men that forces Anna to tell the truth.

Anna prepares to go back to New York until Nonna Alessia finds her at the bus station. She tells Anna that mistakes do not define her, and encourages her to stop running. The family has forgiven her since they were charmed by her, and they, especially Matteo, encourage her to go after Michael. She finds him at the vineyard, serenades him, and they kiss under the sprinklers.

One month later, we see that Anna has stayed in Tuscany to be with Michael and help the Costa family with their restaurant.

== Cast ==
- Halle Bailey as Anna Montgomery, an aspiring chef
- Regé-Jean Page as Michael Costa, a man that Anna falls for
- Lorenzo de Moor as Matteo Costa, Michael's cousin and adoptive brother
- Marco Calvani as Lorenzo, a friendly cab driver
- Aziza Scott as Claire, Anna's friend
- Paolo Sassanelli as Vincenzo Costa, Matteo's father, Michael's adoptive father/uncle, and the proprietor of the family restaurant
- Stefania Casini as Nonna Alessia, Matteo's grandmother
- Nia Vardalos as Mrs. Dunn; Anna works as a housesitter for Mrs. Dunn
- Isabella Ferrari as Gabriella Costa, Matteo's mother and Michael's aunt/adoptive mother
- Emanuele Pacca as Giuseppe, Matteo's groundskeeper
- Desirèe Pöpper as Isabella
- Cocoa Brown as Cora

== Production ==
In March 2025, it was announced that Kat Coiro would be directing a romantic comedy film titled Italianna starring Halle Bailey and Regé-Jean Page. Later in June, Marco Calvani and Aziza Scott joined the cast. In July, Lorenzo de Moor joined the cast.

Principal photography began in June 2025 on location along Italy's Amalfi Coast.

In November 2025, the film was retitled You, Me & Tuscany. The next month, John Debney was confirmed to compose the score for the film.

== Release ==
You, Me & Tuscany was released in the United States on April 10, 2026.

=== Home media ===
The film was released on Blu-ray and DVD on June 16, 2026.

== Reception ==
=== Box office ===
As of September 8, 2026, You, Me & Tuscany has grossed $18.7 million in the United States and Canada, and $3.7 million in other territories, for a worldwide total of $22.5 million. In its opening weekend the film grossed $7.8 million from 3,151 theaters, finishing in fourth.

=== Critical response ===
On the review aggregator website Rotten Tomatoes, 65% of 137 critics' reviews are positive, with an average rating of 5.8/10. The website's consensus reads: "A sweet-natured throwback to the romantic comedies where stakes were low and chemistry easygoing, You, Me & Tuscany doesn't fully justify its credibility gaps but proves as pleasingly light and bubbly as Prosecco." Metacritic, which uses a weighted average, assigned the film a score of 53 out of 100, based on 31 critics, indicating "mixed or average" reviews. Audiences polled by CinemaScore gave the film an average grade of "A-" on an A+ to F scale.
