= And While We Were Here =

- Release poster
- Directed by: Kat Coiro
- Written by: Kat Coiro
- Produced by: Lauren Bratman; Kat Coiro
- Starring: Kate Bosworth; Jamie Blackley; Iddo Goldberg
- Cinematography: Doug Chamberlain
- Edited by: Adam Catino
- Music by: Mateo Messina
- Production companies: 1821 Pictures; Dead Serious Films
- Distributed by: Well Go USA Entertainment
- Release dates: April 22, 2012 (Tribeca); September 13, 2013 (United States)
- Running time: 80 minutes
- Country: United States
- Language: English

And While We Were Here is a 2012 American romantic drama film written and directed by Kat Coiro and starring Kate Bosworth, Jamie Blackley and Iddo Goldberg. It was filmed on the island of Ischia. The film premiered at the 2012 Tribeca Film Festival and showed at the Locarno Film Festival.

The film released to Ultra VOD on August 13, 2012, and to theaters on September 13, 2013. It received mixed reviews from critics.

== Plot ==
Jane and her husband, Leonard, travel to Naples, where Leonard has been hired to teach and perform with his instrument of choice, the viola. Jane and Leonard have a strained marriage, with Leonard, in Jane's belief, not being a supportive or caring husband. Jane is writing a sort of memoir about her grandmother's experiences in the world wars while her husband is at work. Jane visits the island of Ischia to avoid the isolation she faces alone in the couple's hotel room. While out on a walk, she meets the young and outgoing nineteen-year-old Caleb, with whom she strikes up an acquaintance. The two spend the afternoon together and share a dinner later that night. Caleb and Jane run away from the restaurant without paying making Jane feel alive, before Caleb confessing to her that he paid the bill when he went to the bathroom. Caleb asks for Jane's phone number but she refuses and catches a ferry back to her hotel room.

The following day Jane and Leonard share a lunch in which further strain is shown, with Leonard not understanding why Jane has such a fascination with and envy of the life of a 'young, care-free' teenager. As she is saying this, Caleb suddenly arrives at the restaurant and sits with the couple at Jane's invitation. Leonard shows signs of suspicion of the two and promptly asks for the check. The three walk towards Leonard's work and Caleb leaves them but not before writing his address on Jane's hand despite Leonard pointing out that he has a piece of paper. Jane and Leonard say goodbye to each other and Jane walks away and runs into Caleb again. Jane asks Caleb if he is following her to which he asks whether that would be weird. The two walk together and Caleb confesses to Jane that he couldn't sleep after meeting her and actually planned to bump into her so he could see her again. The two share a passionate kiss. However Jane soon pulls away and questions Caleb's motives before leaving and telling him not to follow her. Jane goes home to have a shower but writes down Caleb's address in her notebook so she doesn't lose it when it washes off.

Jane tries to reignite the spark in her marriage and tries to initiate intimacy between the two but Leonard rebuffs her, instead concentrating on his work. Once again, Jane begins to see the cracks in her marriage and soon follows the address in her book to find Caleb. The two share a day of walking, dancing and swimming around the island before the two have sex in his home. Jane goes back to her hotel room and husband the following morning where he scolds her for allowing him to worry about her, especially when she claims she was just walking all night. Jane tells Leonard that they need to talk but he insists that he needs to go to work.

That night, when Leonard arrives home they fight and Jane confesses her affair to him. Leonard is angry at first, throwing a glass at the wall, but soon asks Jane to do what she needs to do. He also asks her to meet him at the train station at four the following day so that can depart the country together and re-patch their marriage, no guilt and no questions asked.

Jane spends the next morning with Caleb but decides to leave him and reject his offer to travel with him. Jane appears at the train station where Leonard is waiting. Leonard smiles but also points out that she is on the wrong side of the tracks and needs to cross over so they can leave together. Jane smiles back with a hint of sadness and a train comes and blocks Leonard's view of Jane. When the train departs, Jane is gone also, implying she got on the train and left both Caleb and Leonard, leaving the latter alone in the train station.

== Cast ==
- Kate Bosworth as Jane
- Jamie Blackley as Caleb
- Iddo Goldberg as Leonard
- Salvatore de Vita as cab driver
- Anthony Migliaccio as pickpocket
- Giuseppe di Iorio as scooter mechanic
- Carlo di Meglio as old man
- Adamo Galano as waiter #1
- Marco Trofa as waiter #2

== Production ==
Coiro chose to shoot on the island of Ischia because one of her producers had a home there where they could film parts of the movie. While writing the script she used Google Earth to find interesting locations and once on Ischia she and the crew would arrive and illegally film in those locations without asking for permission.

The film was shot in color but director Coiro and her cinematographer ultimately wanted it to be shown in black and white. The film had a successful festival run in black and white but Coiro ultimately decided to release the movie in color so as not to limit her potential audience.

== Reception ==
On review aggregator website Rotten Tomatoes, the film has a rating of 45% based on 22 critics, with an average rating of 4.7/10. On Metacritic, the film has a score of 48 out of 100 based on reviews from 10 critics, indicating "mixed or average" reviews.

Stephen Holden of The New York Times wrote "The marital crisis at the [film's] heart has lost its allegorical weight. Jane and Leonard are just another unhappy couple with problems that have nothing to do with the direction of Western civilization". Ellington of the Los Angeles Times had a different take on the film. Her reaction to it was "It's to Coiro's credit that no one emerges as a villain - and that, however painful, on the other side lies hope". Nick Schager of The A.V. Club had compared the film to Richard Linklater's Before Sunrise, calling And While We Were Here derivative. He also praised lead actress, Kate Bosworth, calling her "committed", but also stating that "there's ultimately no real role for her to play-like her male co-stars", adding that "she's simply stuck embodying a series of cliched poses". Wes Greene of Slant Magazine gave And While We Were Here one star out of four and compared the film to another romantic drama, Voyage to Italy by Roberto Rossellini.

While attending Tribeca Film Festival, Frank Scheck of The Hollywood Reporter said that "unfortunately, this tale of an illicit romance between an unhappily married woman and a younger man traffics in far too many genre clichs, beginning with its idyllic locale". According to John Anderson of Variety, "Between the architectural pillars of Renaissance Italy and Kate Bosworth, helmer Kat Coiro hangs a gossamer tale of ruined love and liberation with While We Were Here.
