= Still Alice (novel) =

2007 novel by Lisa Genova

- Author: Lisa Genova
- Audio read by: Lisa Genova
- Cover artist: Mary Austin Speaker
- Language: English
- Publisher: iUniverse, Pocket Books
- Publication date: 2007 (Note: Genova initially self-published Still Alice through iUniverse. The novel was later acquired by Simon & Schuster and published through its Pocket Books division on January 6, 2009.)
- Publication place: United States
- Media type: Print, e-book, audio
- Pages: 292
- ISBN: 1-59722-939-3
- OCLC: 732649658
- Dewey Decimal: 813/.6
- LC Class: PS3607.E55 S75 2008; PS3607.E55 S75 2009

Still Alice is a 2007 novel by Lisa Genova, a neuroscientist and author. The novel is about a woman who suffers early-onset Alzheimer's disease. It is Genova's first novel.

Genova self-published the book in 2007 with iUniverse. Beverly Beckham of The Boston Globe wrote, "After I read Still Alice I wanted to stand up and tell a train full of strangers, 'You have to get this book.'" Beckham notes that the story is told from the inside: "This is Alice Howland's story, for as long as she can tell it."

The book was later acquired by Simon & Schuster and published in January 2009 by Pocket Books (now Gallery Books). It was on The New York Times Best Seller list for more than 40 weeks. It has been sold in 30 countries and translated into more than 20 languages.

== Synopsis ==
Alice Howland, a 50-year-old woman, is a cognitive psychology professor at Harvard University and a world-renowned linguistics expert. She is married to an equally successful husband, and they have three grown children. When she becomes increasingly disoriented and forgetful, a tragic diagnosis changes her life and her relationship with her family and the world.

== Writing style ==
The book presents the story through Alice's point of view, and the thoughts of other characters are not stated. Alexis Gordon of the University of Toronto Medical Journal wrote that Still Alice uses a "plain, unornamented, and sometimes even clinical style, which belies the strong emotions the book brings forth."

== Reception ==
The book won the 2008 Bronte Prize. Alexis Gordon stated that general readers and patients had a positive reception to the book. Sue Ransohoff of the Christian Science Monitor wrote that Genova "writes with authority that makes her subject come alive, and somehow, become less terrifying than one might anticipate." The book was placed on the publication's "reader recommendation" list.

Publishers Weekly wrote that there was "heavy-handed" dialogue and "clumsy" prose, and that "beyond the heartbreaking record of illness there's little here to remember." PW wrote that "it's impossible not to feel for Alice and her loved ones" and "This novel will appeal to those dealing with the disease and may prove helpful".Kirkus Reviews wrote that the book was "Worthy, benign and readable, but not always lifelike."

== Adaptations ==
The book was adapted for the stage by Christine Mary Dunford for the Lookingglass Theatre Company in Chicago, Illinois. The play was produced from April 10 – May 19, 2013.

Memento Films and Killer Films produced a film adaptation of the book, starring Julianne Moore in her Academy Award-winning role as Alice Howland, and co-starring Alec Baldwin, Kristen Stewart, and Kate Bosworth. The film made many changes in its interpretation, the biggest being the change of setting to New York, where Alice teaches at Columbia University. Subsequently, the film also changes John's job offer from chairman of the Cancer Biology and Genetics Program at Sloan-Kettering in New York to a job offer at the Mayo Clinic in Minnesota.
