= A Case of You (film) =

- Theatrical release poster
- Directed by: Kat Coiro
- Written by: Christian Long; Justin Long; Keir O'Donnell
- Produced by: Jesse Kennedy; Logan Levy; Justin Long; Keir O'Donnell; Holly Wiersma
- Starring: Justin Long; Evan Rachel Wood; Brendan Fraser; Vince Vaughn; Peter Billingsley
- Cinematography: Doug Chamberlain
- Edited by: Adam Catino; Matt Landon
- Music by: Mateo Messina
- Production companies: Lagniappe Films; I'm So Sorry Productions
- Distributed by: IFC Films
- Release dates: April 21, 2013 (Tribeca); November 8, 2013 (United States)
- Running time: 89 minutes
- Country: United States
- Language: English

A Case of You is a 2013 American romantic comedy film. The film was directed by Kat Coiro and produced by and starring Justin Long, who wrote the script with his brother Christian and Keir O'Donnell, who also stars in the film. The title is taken from the Joni Mitchell song of the same name, though the song is not featured in the film.

It premiered at the Tribeca Film Festival in April 2013 and was released in the United States by IFC Films in November of the same year. It received mixed to negative reviews from critics.

== Plot ==
Sam, a young New York City author, is dissatisfied with his life. Although his novelization of the blockbuster film Teen Vampire is popular, he does not want to write the other novelizations despite encouragement from his agent, Alan. Sam suffers from writer's block with his own work. He becomes is infatuated with Birdie, a street artist and barista at the local coffee shop, but does not know how to meet her.

After his roommate, Eliot, suggests checking Birdie's Facebook profile, Sam decides to pretend that he shares the interests she lists on her profile. He begins to learn how to play the guitar and cook French cuisine, and buys books by Walt Whitman and songs by Joan Baez. After pretending to accidentally meet at a comedy club Birdie mentioned online the two become friends and partners at a ballroom-dance class, and Sam begins to write a novel based on their relationship.

To spend more time with her Sam pretends to share Birdie's other interests, including pedicures and bourbon. They begin to fall in love, and Birdie accompanies Sam, Eliot, and Eliot's girlfriend, Ashley, to a spiritual retreat where they sleep together for the first time. Although Sam enjoys spending time with Birdie he finds participating in her many interests to be difficult, and is intimidated by her skill in such areas as caricature, singing, and rock climbing.

After Birdie tells Sam that she loves him and mentions her parents' plan to attend their impending dance recital, an insecure Sam discourages her interest in him. At a pitch meeting, Alan and another agent praise Sam's novel as a superb portrayal of a pathetic "eunuch" who, after foolishly breaking up with his girlfriend, is doomed to remain alone. Realizing that he has made a mistake, Sam rushes to the recital where Birdie is about to perform with another partner. He states his love for her and confesses to using her Facebook profile to adjust his public persona. She tells him that she knew all the time, even adding items to see whether he would respond. She decides to let each other begin from where they left off and Sam decides to give his book a happy ending. They begin to dance together.

== Cast ==
- Justin Long as Sam
- Evan Rachel Wood as Birdie
- Sam Rockwell as Gary
- Sienna Miller as Sarah
- Brendan Fraser as Tony
- Vince Vaughn as Alan
- Peter Dinklage as Gerard
- Keir O'Donnell as Eliot
- Busy Philipps as Ashley
- Peter Billingsley as Scott
- Mizuo Peck as Jemily
- Emilio Delgado as Roberto
- Savannah Wise as Lily
- Scott Adsit as Cheesy Announcer

== Release ==
A Case of You premiered at the 2013 Tribeca Film Festival and was released by IFC Films on video on demand platforms as well as in a limited theatrical release on November 8, 2013. It was released on DVD on February 4, 2014.

== Reception ==
On Rotten Tomatoes, the film has a rating of 47%, based on 19 reviews, with an average rating of 4.8/10. Metacritic gives the film a score of 38 out of 100, based on nine critics, indicating "generally unfavorable" reviews.

Andy Webster of The New York Times states in his review, "While this unrelentingly midtempo movie milks Brooklyn for its chic, it manages to denude it of its color. A moment of dramatic anger from Sam feels forced and abrupt, while — surprise — the climax involves a dash to a joyous reunion. The filmmakers sought the rights to Joni Mitchell's classic song 'A Case of You'; to her credit, she wouldn't hand them over, perhaps because the tune is imbued with deep, honest feelings." Dennis Harvey of Variety wrote, "A lot of interesting, funny performers aren't very interesting or funny [...] this surprisingly bland indie version of the generic mainstream romantic comedy has talent to burn, none of it put to good use. It’s not awful, but the paucity of fresh ideas or humor makes this overly safe first writing effort for all three scribes innocuous to the point of instant forgettability."
