= Kat Coiro =

American director and producer

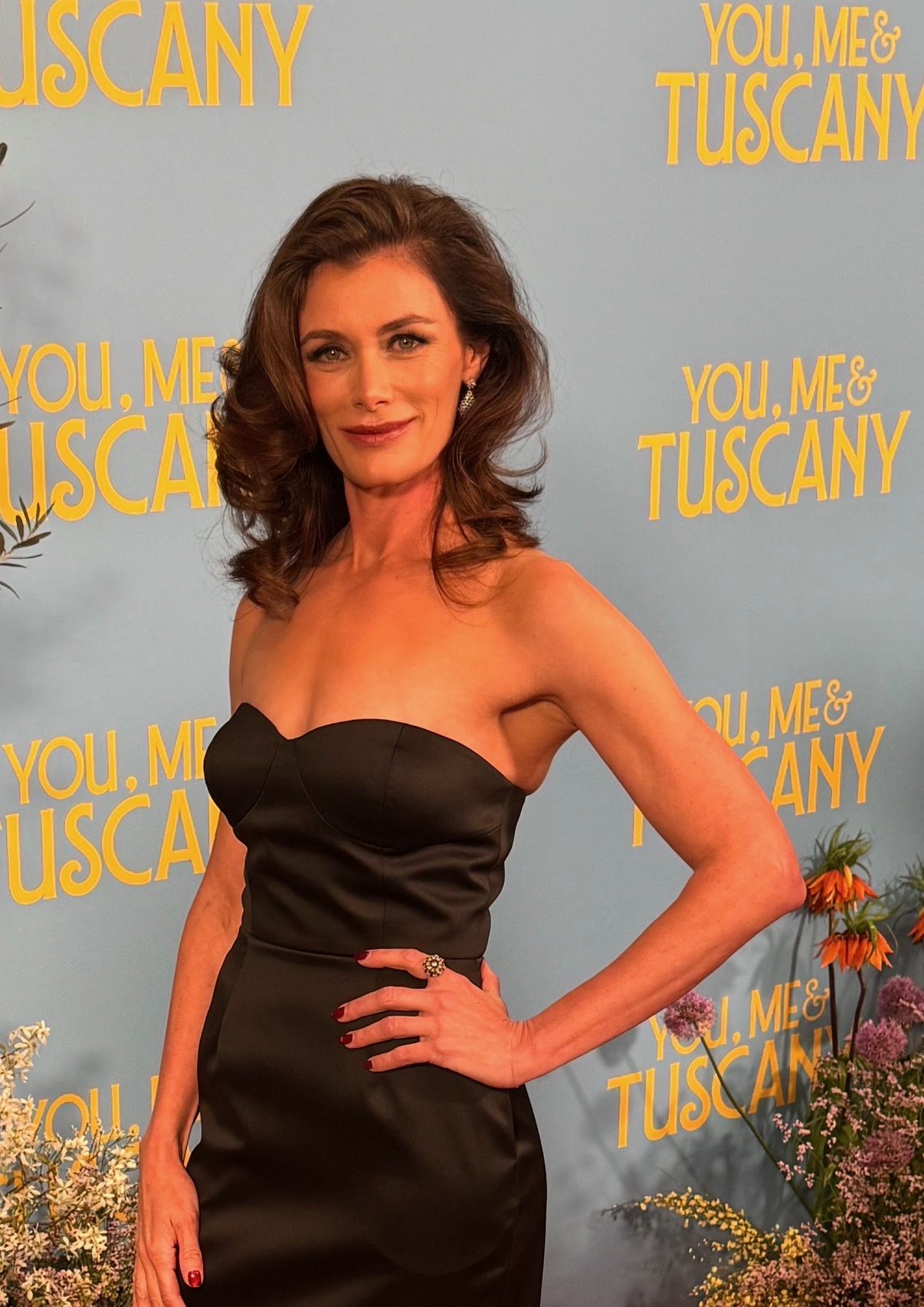
- Coiro in 2026
- Born: New York City, U.S.
- Occupations: Film director; television director
- Notable work: Marry Me; You, Me & Tuscany; Matlock; She-Hulk: Attorney at Law
- Spouse: Rhys Coiro

Kat Coiro is an American film and television director. She directed Marry Me (2022) and You, Me & Tuscany (2026), and has directed and produced television pilots including Matlock, Marvel's She-Hulk: Attorney at Law, and The Spiderwick Chronicles.

== Early life ==
Coiro was born in Manhattan to Peter Eves and Gina Cunningham-Eves, and is of English and Italian descent. Her sister, Emmy Eves worked as an art director on Coiro's first film.

She attended boarding school at Interlochen Arts Academy before studying theater and Russian history at Carnegie Mellon University. She later studied directing at the Moscow Art Theatre in Russia before moving to Los Angeles to pursue filmmaking.

== Career ==
=== Film ===
She began her filmmaking career directing independent micro-budget feature films, including L!fe Happens (2011), starring Krysten Ritter, and And While We Were Here (2012), starring Kate Bosworth which premiered at the Tribeca Film Festival and was shot in Italy.

Coiro later moved into studio filmmaking with the Universal Pictures romantic comedy Marry Me (2022), starring Jennifer Lopez and Owen Wilson. In 2026, Coiro directed the romantic comedy You, Me & Tuscany for Universal Pictures, starring Halle Bailey and Regé-Jean Page. It was filmed in Tuscany, Italy.

=== Television ===
Coiro has directed and executive produced several television pilots and series. She directed and executive produced the pilot for the CBS reboot of Matlock, starring Kathy Bates. She also directed the pilot episodes of Marvel Studios' She-Hulk: Attorney at Law, Peacock's Girls5eva, and Pop TV's Florida Girls.

For Roku's adaptation of The Spiderwick Chronicles, Coiro directed the first two episodes and served as executive producer. The premiere episode, "Welcome to Spiderwick," earned her nominations for Outstanding Directorial Achievement in Children's Programs at the Directors Guild of America Awards and Outstanding Directing for a Single Camera Live Action Series at the Children's & Family Emmy Awards.

Additional episodic directing credits include Modern Family, Brooklyn Nine-Nine, It's Always Sunny in Philadelphia, Dead to Me, Shameless, Mozart in the Jungle, and Single Parents. Coiro has also worked as an actress, appearing in commercials and television series including Charmed, Judging Amy, Law & Order: Special Victims Unit, and Law & Order: Criminal Intent amongst others.

== Personal life ==
Coiro is married to actor Rhys Coiro, whom she directed in Life Happens and She-Hulk: Attorney at Law. They have three children and live in Los Angeles.

Coiro serves on the board of Habits of Waste, has been involved in sustainability initiatives including #LightsCameraPlastic, and she has worked with the Easterseals Disability Film Challenge.

== Credits ==
=== Television ===
Year	Title	Notes	Ref.
2014	Slouching Towards Adulthood	Pilot for NBC based on Sally Koslow's book.	
2015	Splitting the Difference	Pilot for ABC based on Tre Miller Rodriguez's memoir.	
2016	Untitled Kat Coiro	Pilot for ABC based on growing up above a Haitian Restaurant in Miami Beach.	
2017	Girlfriends' Guide to Divorce		
2017	Alone Together	ABC Freeform	
2017	The Mick	5 episodes	
2017	Brooklyn Nine-Nine	1 episode	
2017	Mozart in the Jungle	1 episode	
2018	Sideswiped	2 episodes	
2018	Florida Girls	Pilot + 3 episodes	
2018	Daddy Issues	Pilot	
2018	It's Always Sunny in Philadelphia	4 episodes	
2018	Shameless	1 episode	
2018	Modern Family	1 episode	
2018	The Kids Are Alright	1 episode	
2018–2019	Single Parents	2 episodes	
2019	Dead to Me	2 episodes	
2021	Girls5eva	Pilot; also co-executive producer	
2022	She-Hulk: Attorney at Law	6 episodes; 9 executive producer	
2024–present	The Spiderwick Chronicles	2 episodes; 8 executive producer	
2024-present	Matlock	12 episodes; 32 executive producer	

=== Films ===
Year	Title	Director	Writer	Producer	Ref.
2011	L!fe Happens	Yes	Yes	Co-producer	
2012	And While We Were Here	Yes	Yes	Yes	
2013	A Case of You	Yes	No	No	
2022	Marry Me	Yes	No	No	
2026	You, Me & Tuscany	Yes	No	No	
