= Karen Kain =

Canadian former ballet dancer

Karen Kain CC OOnt
- Born: Karen Alexandria Kain; March 28, 1951 (age 75); Hamilton, Ontario, Canada
- Education: National Ballet School of Canada
- Occupations: Ballet dancer, administrator
- Spouse: Ross Petty (m. 1983)

Karen Alexandria Kain (born March 28, 1951) is a Canadian former ballet dancer and was the Artistic Director of the National Ballet of Canada from 2005 to 2021.

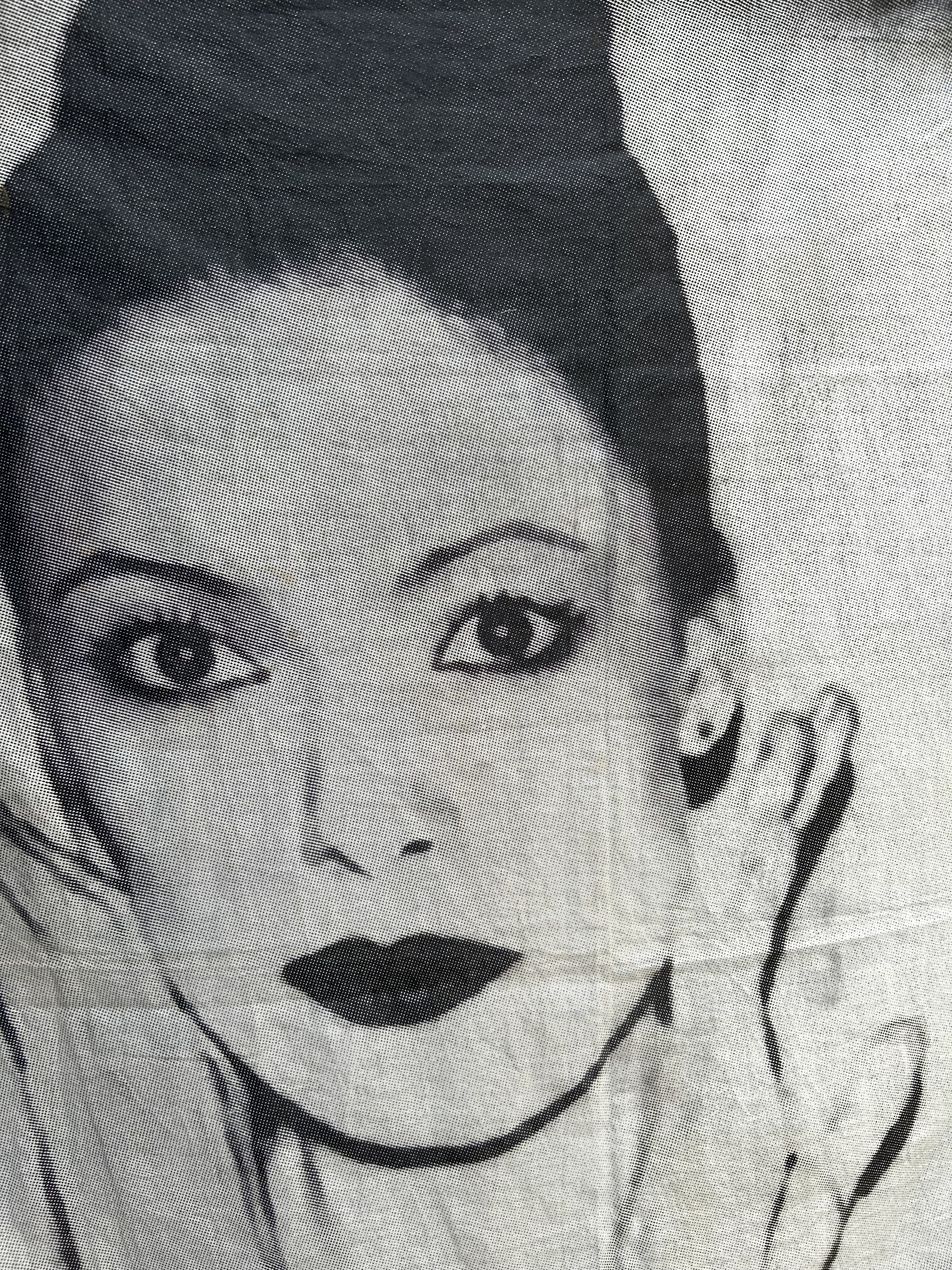
Karen Kain 40” Warhol Test Print 1980

== Early training and childhood ==
Kain's mother enrolled her daughter in ballet training because she believed it would improve her postural alignment, poise, and discipline. The family moved from Ancaster to Erindale Woodlands, Toronto Township when Kain was in grade 6 (age 11, 1962) so she could begin training at the National Ballet School of Canada. (The majority of Toronto Township, including Erindale Woodlands, is now Mississauga.) Upon graduating in 1969, she was invited to join the National Ballet of Canada. She also participated in Girl Guides of Canada programs as a member.

== Career ==
Kain became a principal dancer in 1971, performing central roles in a wide array of ballets, eventually becoming well known in Canada, with the help of legendary dancer Rudolf Nureyev. She worked as a guest artist with Roland Petit's Ballet National de Marseilles, the Bolshoi Ballet, the London Festival Ballet, the Paris Opera Ballet, the Hamburg Ballet, the Vienna State Opera Ballet, and the Eliot Feld Ballet. Kain is a subject of The Portraits of Andy Warhol, c. 1980.

During her career, she performed in many ballets from classical and modern repertoire including among others Swan Lake (Erik Bruhn) Coppélia, The Sleeping Beauty (Rudolph Nureyev), Giselle, Romeo and Juliet (John Cranko), La fille mal gardée, Onegin (John Cranko), The Taming of the Shrew (John Cranko), Pastorale (James Kudelka), Carmen (Roland Petit), Concerto Barocco (Balanchine), A Month in the Country (Frederick Ashton) and Nutcracker in which she was often paired with dancer Frank Augustyn. The talent of Kain and Augustyn came to the attention of the public and peers as soon as 1973 when they won prizes at the 1973 Moscow International Ballet Competition.

In 1977, Kain stopped dancing, but started again in 1981 with the National Ballet of Canada, where she performed for 15 more years. In 1996, Kain reunited with Frank Augustyn to appear in her husband Ross Petty's panto production of Robin Hood at Toronto's Elgin Theatre. Kain retired as a professional dancer in 1997.

In 1998, she returned to the National Ballet of Canada as part of the senior management team, in the role of artistic associate. She supported artistic director James Kudelka against principal dancer Kimberley Glasco in a wrongful-dismissal suit. In 2005, she succeeded Kudelka as artistic director. She stepped down from that role in 2021.

Kain served as a president of the jury at the Prix de Lausanne ballet competition in 2009.

Kain was the founding board president of Canada's Dancer Transition Resource Centre. Kain's autobiography, Movement Never Lies, was published in 1994 by McClelland and Stewart.

== Awards ==
In 1973, she won silver in the women's competition and the first prize for best pas de deux (with Frank Augustyn) at the second International Ballet Competition in Moscow dancing the Bluebird pas de deux from Sleeping Beauty.

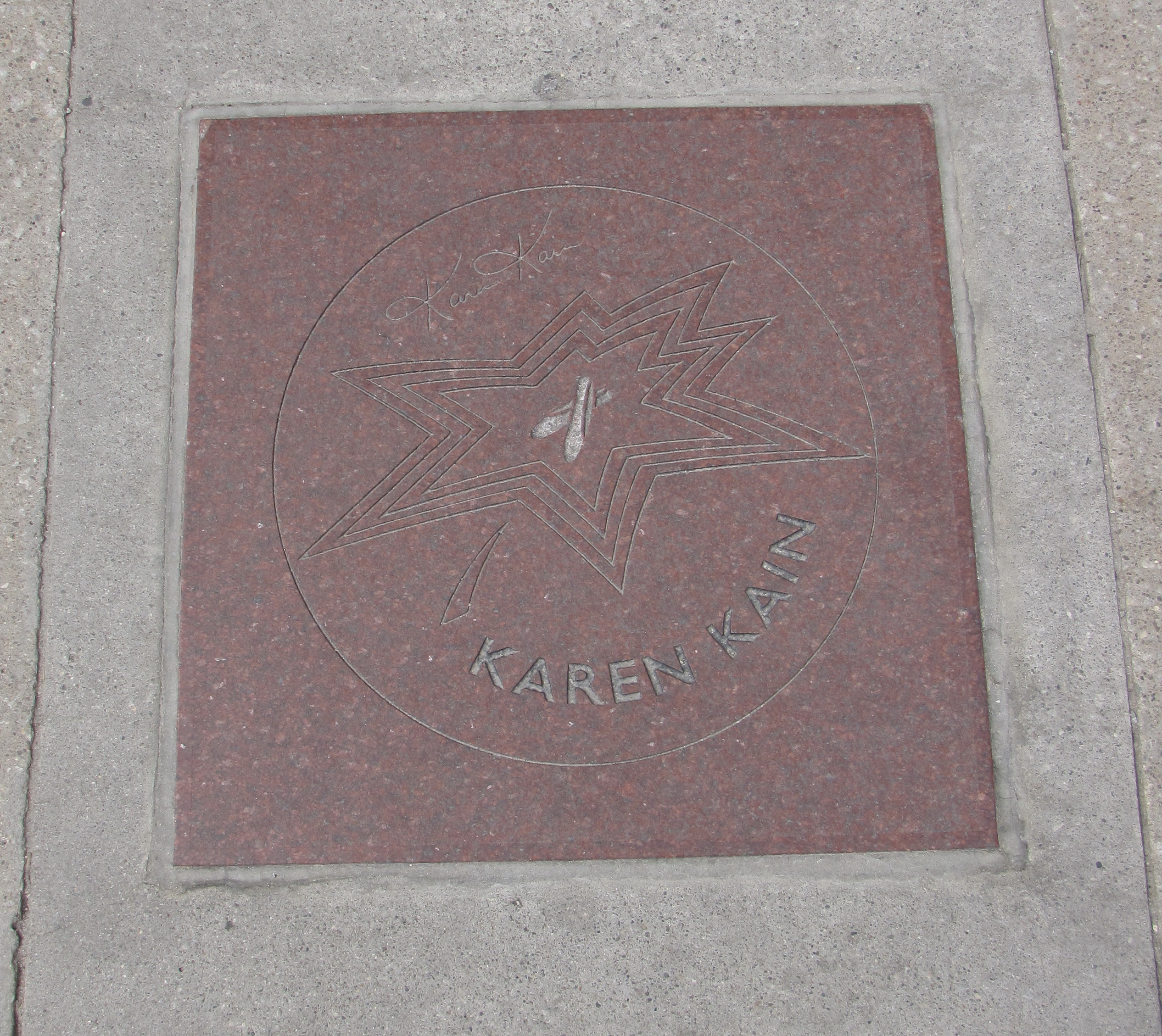
Karen Kain's star on Canada's Walk of Fame.

In 1976, she was appointed an Officer of the Order of Canada (OC) and was made a Companion of the Order of Canada (CC) in 1991. She was made a member of the Order of Ontario in 1990. She holds honorary degrees from the University of Toronto, York University, McMaster University, Trent University, and the University of British Columbia. In May 1998, the French Government named her an Officer of the Order of Arts and Letters. Among Kain's other honours are the National Arts Centre Award, a companion award of the Governor General's Performing Arts Awards (1997) and the Governor General's Performing Arts Award for Lifetime Artistic Achievement (2002). In 1996, she became the first Canadian to receive the Cartier Lifetime Achievement Award. The choreographer Marguerite Derricks cited Kain as one of her heroes. in 1989 the Canadian Broadcasting Corporation made a documentary about her, Karen Kain, Prima Ballerina. In 2002, she received the Queen Elizabeth II Golden Jubilee Medal.

Kain had an arts based public middle school in Etobicoke named after her (Karen Kain School of the Arts) in 2008. In 2012, Kain received the Queen Elizabeth II Diamond Jubilee Medal. In 1998, she was inducted into Canada's Walk of Fame.

=== Honorary postage stamp ===
In April 2021, Kain was recognized by Canada Post as a "legend of ballet" for her lifetime of artistic achievements with a permanent domestic stamp displaying a ballet leap.

== Personal life ==
Kain has been married since 1983 to Ross Petty, a stage and film actor, and producer of theatrical pantomime productions in Canada for over 20 years. Kain's brother, Kevin Kain, is a noted tropical medicine expert based in Toronto, Ontario; she has three younger siblings and two nephews - Dylan and Taylor Kain.

== Other ==
In 1976, Kain appeared in a televised version of the ballet Giselle in the highly coveted title role, alongside Nadia Potts, Frank Augustyn, and Anne Ditchburn. The production was first shown in 1986. In 1985, Kain starred in an episode of the popular Canadian TV series Seeing Things. Kain was also alluded to in the 2003 movie directed by Denys Arcand, The Barbarian Invasions, when Rémy Girard reminisced about his past love affairs. Kain did a TV commercial for The Art Shoppe, a furniture store in Toronto during the 1970s

Kain's production of Swan Lake, her final project as the artistic director for the National Ballet of Canada before her retirement, is profiled in Chelsea McMullan's 2023 documentary film Swan Song.
