= Kate Bosworth =

American actress (born 1983)

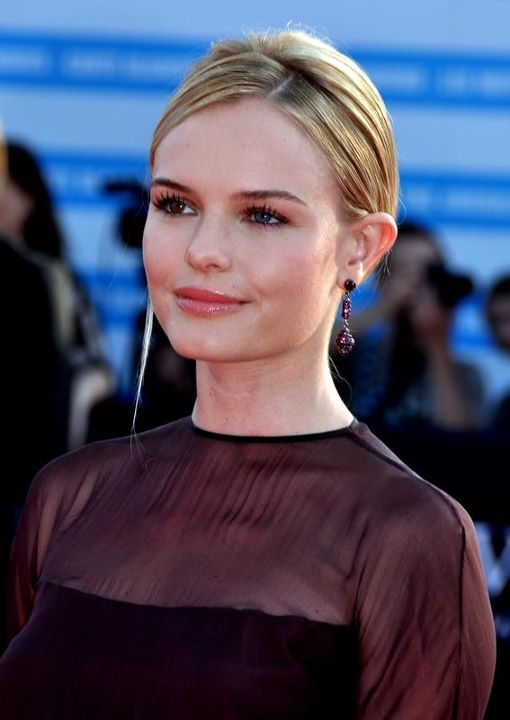
- Bosworth in 2011
- Born: Catherine Anne Bosworth; January 2, 1983 (age 43); Los Angeles, California, U.S.
- Occupation: Actress
- Years active: 1997–present
- Spouses: Michael Polish (m. 2013; div. 2023) Justin Long (m. 2023)
- Children: 1
- Relatives: R. James Long (father-in-law)

Catherine Anne Bosworth (born January 2, 1983) is an American actress. Following minor roles in the films The Horse Whisperer (1998) and Remember the Titans (2000), she had a leading role in the movie Blue Crush (2002).

Bosworth had roles in independent films, playing Dawn Schiller in the true crime film Wonderland (2003) and Sandra Dee in the Bobby Darin biographical drama Beyond the Sea (2004). She portrayed Lois Lane in Superman Returns (2006) and had roles in 21 (2008), Straw Dogs (2011), And While We Were Here (2012), and Still Alice (2014). Bosworth starred in the horror films Before I Wake (2016) and The Domestics (2018), then as KC in the Netflix science-fiction miniseries The I-Land (2019).

== Early life ==
Catherine Anne Bosworth was born on January 2, 1983, in Los Angeles and lived in San Francisco as a child. She is the only child of Patricia (née Potter), a homemaker, and Harold Bosworth, a former executive for Talbots. Bosworth was born with heterochromia iridum, and has a hazel right iris and a blue left iris. When she was six years old, her family moved from San Francisco to various parts of the country due to her father's job. Bosworth was raised mainly on the U.S. East Coast, in Massachusetts and Connecticut.

Bosworth developed an interest in equestrian sports, specifically stadium jumping, and by age 14, she was a champion equestrian. Bosworth graduated from Cohasset High School in Cohasset, Massachusetts in 2001.

== Career ==
=== Early work ===
Bosworth's first film role came after an open casting call in New York for the supporting part of Judith in the 1998 film The Horse Whisperer. The producers needed someone who was an experienced horse rider, and Bosworth won the role. The film earned a positive reception from film critics. In 2000, she starred as Bella Banks in the television series drama Young Americans, which was canceled. That same year, Bosworth had a small part in the film Remember the Titans. In 2001, she moved to Los Angeles to seek better film parts.

=== Initial success ===
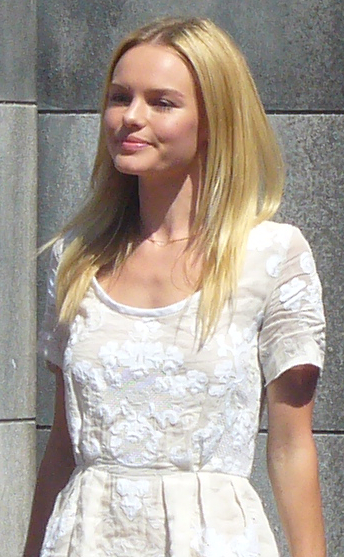
Bosworth in 2006

Bosworth's breakthrough role came in the 2002 surfing film Blue Crush. She prepared for the role by working with two trainers seven hours a day for months, adding 15 pounds (6.8 kg) of muscle to her frame. In his review of the film, Rolling Stone' Peter Travers wrote, "Bosworth is a star in the making, but even she can't outshine the surfing footage, which is flat-out spectacular." The film received positive reviews and grossed $40 million at the United States box office. In 2003, Bosworth took on the lead role in the low-budget Wonderland. She played the teenage girlfriend of porn star John Holmes.

In 2004, Bosworth played the lead role in romantic comedy Win a Date with Tad Hamilton!, opposite Topher Grace. It was critically and financially unsuccessful. Also that year, she portrayed actress Sandra Dee in Beyond the Sea. Reviews were mixed, and it was a box office failure, though Bosworth's performance received critical acclaim. In 2005, she portrayed Chali, a Hare Krishna, in the film adaptation of Myla Goldberg's novel Bee Season about a dysfunctional Jewish family.

=== Late 2000s ===
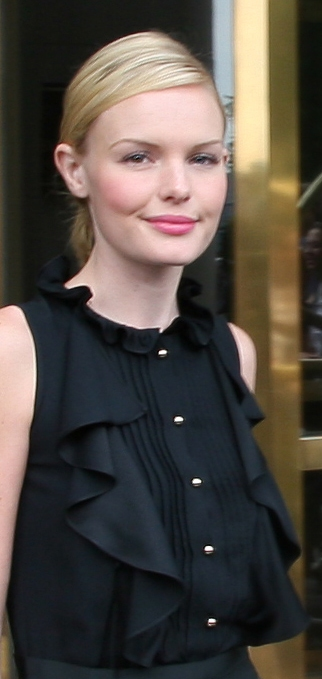
Bosworth at the 2007 Toronto International Film Festival

Bosworth was cast as reporter Lois Lane in Bryan Singer's film Superman Returns (2006), which also starred her Beyond the Sea co-star Kevin Spacey as Lex Luthor, and newcomer Brandon Routh as Superman. It was a box office success and received mostly positive reviews. However, Bosworth's performance was not well received; Anthony Lane of The New Yorker wrote, "The new Lois Lane, Kate Bosworth, is not a patch on Margot Kidder, or, for that matter, on Teri Hatcher, in the TV series." San Francisco Chronicle film critic Mick LaSalle felt that Bosworth, at age 22, was too young to portray Lane, and that the climax did not "match the potential of the tiring 154 minute long film". Although Bosworth's performance was ambivalently received, she loved working on the film. In a candid interview with Teen Vogue published in the August 2006 issue, Bosworth expressed her deep affection for the film and described the experience as a transformative period in her life, where she felt a newfound sense of self and completeness. Bosworth was eventually nominated for worst supporting actress at the Razzie Awards for the part. The movie grossed $52 million on its opening weekend in North America and went on to earn $391 million worldwide.

Bosworth starred as Louise in the psychological drama The Girl in the Park. It premiered at the 2007 Toronto International Film Festival, and was subsequently picked up by The Weinstein Company. Alissa Simon of Variety wrote that Bosworth "tries her best, but her character's too extremely drawn." Bosworth also filmed 21, an adaptation of the book Bringing Down the House, in early 2007 in Boston, Massachusetts and Las Vegas, Nevada, reuniting with co-star Kevin Spacey and director Robert Luketic. It garnered mixed reviews, with Joanne Kaufman of The Wall Street Journal concluding, "Very little adds up in 21."

In 2006, Bosworth optioned the film rights to Catherine Hanrahan's novel Lost Girls and Love Hotels and was set to produce the project with filmmaker Nadia Connors. It was finally made with Alexandra Daddario in the lead role. Four years later, she starred in The Warrior's Way, shot in New Zealand with Korean actor Jang Dong-gun and Geoffrey Rush. It was one of 2010's biggest box-office flops, grossing slightly more than $11,000,000 worldwide against its $42 million budget. Bosworth has said about her roles, "I just don't do comfort zones."

In January 2008, Bosworth was named the new face of Calvin Klein Jeans and appeared in their ad campaigns. She became the spokesperson for the American luxury bag brand Coach in Asia.

=== 2010s: Fashion and acting ===
In 2011, Bosworth was contracted to sing the television jingle for Cotton Incorporated's "Fabric of My Life" advertisement. On December 4, 2012, Topshop revealed that she was the "secret" woman in the new Topshop Christmas advertisements.

Bosworth designed a jewelry line with friend and celebrity stylist Cher Coulter called JewelMint, which launched in October 2010. The first vertical venture of MySpace co-founder Josh Berman and Diego Berdakin's social commerce company, BeachMint features designs by Coulter and Bosworth.

In 2012, Bosworth was the face of skincare brand SK-II.

She appeared in 10 films between 2011 and 2014, moving away from the big-budget Superman franchise into lower-budget film roles, such as Still Alice with Julianne Moore. The short film Lov, featured her and launched fashion designer Vanessa Bruno's fall 2011 campaign.

In 2013, Bosworth was cast in the horror film Before I Wake directed by Mike Flanagan; it was released on Netflix in 2017.

In 2018, Bosworth was cast in the postapocalyptic horror film The Domestics released on June 28 that year. A few months later, she was announced as having the main role of KC on the Netflix science fiction miniseries The I-Land. It was released on September 12, 2019. That year, Bosworth was cast in the sci-fi thriller Genesis.

== Activism and honors ==
In 2018, Bosworth was included in People magazine's list of 25 Women Changing the World. In late 2018, she and then husband Michael Polish debuted their privately funded film Nona, which focuses on the issues of human trafficking. Bosworth works closely with the Coalition to Abolish Slavery and Trafficking.

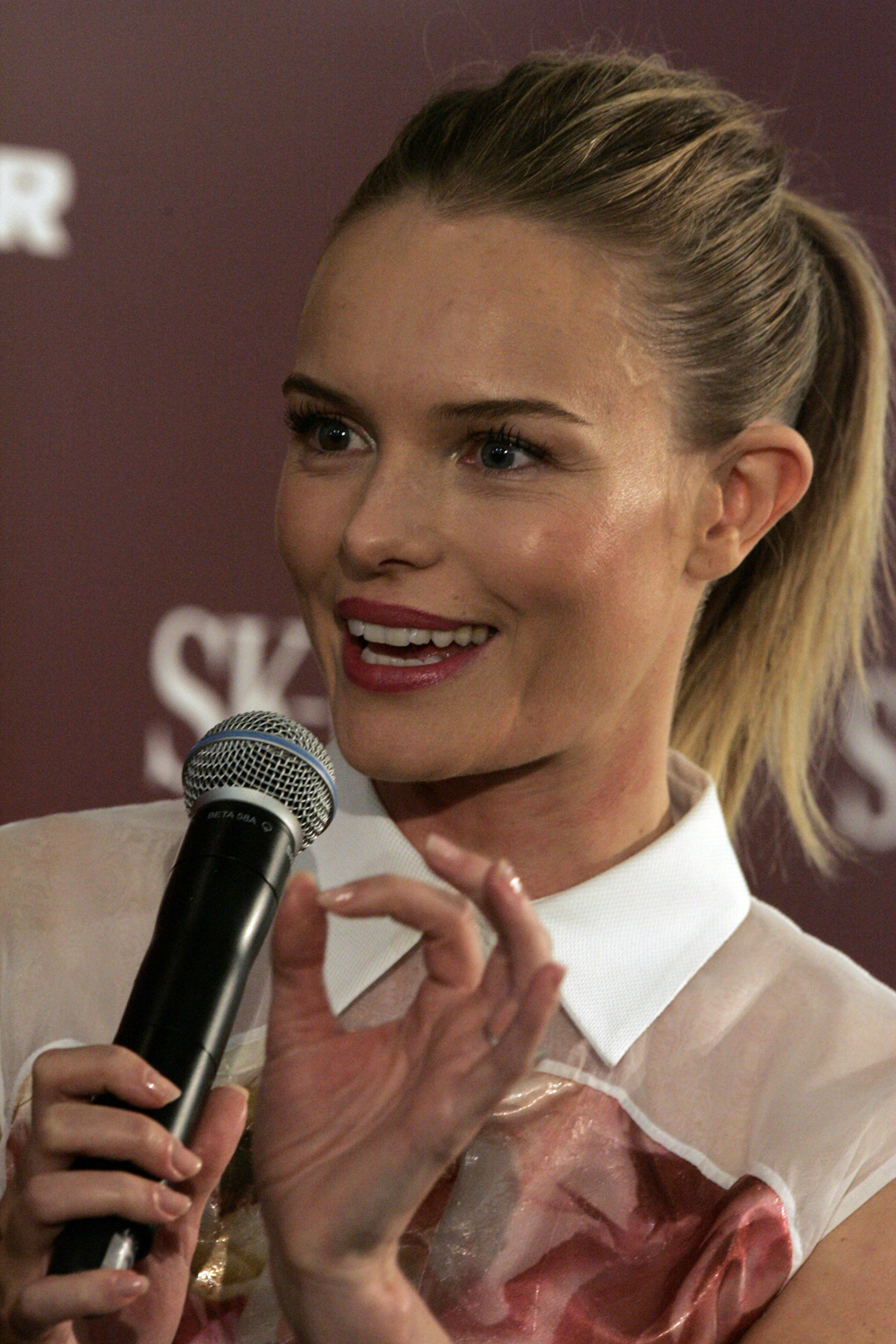
Bosworth in Sydney, Australia, in 2012

In 2018, Bosworth and Polish opened the Montana Institute of the Arts, a summer school for filmmaking students.

== Personal life ==
Bosworth was accepted to Princeton University in late 2000, but because of continual deferral of her attendance, Bosworth's acceptance was revoked. She is a member of the Appalachia Service Project.

Bosworth had a relationship with actor Orlando Bloom from 2002 to 2005. In mid-2011, she began dating American director Michael Polish, whom she met earlier that year when he directed her in Big Sur. They announced their engagement in August 2012, and got married on August 31, 2013, in Philipsburg, Montana. Bosworth became the stepmother to Jasper, Polish's daughter from a previous marriage, whom Bosworth said was "hands-down the greatest unexpected gift of her life." In August 2021, she announced her separation from Polish. They legally divorced in March 2023.

Bosworth is a Buddhist, following Mahayana Buddhism. She enjoys running and Pilates, and practices meditation. Bosworth is a fan of the Dallas Cowboys.

Because Bosworth's grandparents suffered from Alzheimer's disease, the book Still Alice has had an impact on her. Bosworth contacted the author, Lisa Genova, and later appeared in the film Still Alice, based on the book.

In January 2022, it was reported that Bosworth was in a relationship with actor Justin Long. In April 2023, the couple confirmed their engagement. A month later, Long indicated that the couple had married. On July 18, 2025, they had a daughter via surrogacy.

== Filmography ==
=== Film ===
Year	Title	Role	Notes
1998	The Horse Whisperer	Judith	
2000	The Newcomers	Courtney Docherty	
2000	Remember the Titans	Emma Hoyt	
2002	Blue Crush	Anne Marie Chadwick	Nominated – MTV Movie Award for Best On-Screen Duo (shared with Michelle Rodriguez and Sanoe Lake); Nominated – MTV Movie Award for Best Breakthrough Female Performance; Nominated – Teen Choice Award for Choice Movie Actress – Drama/Action Adventure
2002	The Rules of Attraction	Kelly	
2003	Wonderland	Dawn Schiller	
2003	Advantage Hart	Trinity Montage	Short film
2004	Win a Date with Tad Hamilton!	Rosalee Futch	Nominated – Teen Choice Award for Choice Movie Actress – Comedy; Nominated – Teen Choice Award for Choice Movie Blush; Nominated – Teen Choice Award for Choice Movie Liplock (shared with Topher Grace)
2004	Beyond the Sea	Sandra Dee	
2005	Bee Season	Chali	
2006	Superman Returns	Lois Lane	Nominated – Saturn Award for Best Actress; Nominated – Razzie Award for Worst Supporting Actress; Nominated – Teen Choice Award for Choice Chemistry (shared with Brandon Routh)
2007	The Girl in the Park	Louise	
2008	21	Jill Taylor	ShoWest – Special Award for Best Ensemble; Nominated – Teen Choice Award for Choice Movie Actress: Drama
2010	Death Bed Subtext	Daughter	Short film
2010	Idiots	Maggie	Short film
2010	The Warrior's Way	Lynne	
2011	Little Birds	Bonnie Muller	
2011	Another Happy Day	Alice	
2011	L!fe Happens	Deena	
2011	Straw Dogs	Amy Sumner	
2012	Black Rock	Sarah	
2012	And While We Were Here	Jane Byrne	
2013	Big Sur	Billie	
2013	Movie 43	Arlene	Nominated – Razzie Award for Worst Screen Combo (shared with the entire cast)
2013	Homefront	Cassie Bodine	
2014	Still Alice	Anna	
2015	Amnesiac	Hilary	
2015	Life on the Line	Bailey	
2015	90 Minutes in Heaven	Eva Piper	
2015	Heist	Sydney Silva	
2016	Before I Wake	Jessie Hobson	
2016	We Shot Ourselves		
2018	The Domestics	Nina Monroe West	
2019	The Devil Has a Name	Gigi Cutler	
2020	Force of Nature	Troy Barrett	
2021	Wild Indian	Greta Peterson	
2022	The Immaculate Room	Kate	
2022	Along for the Ride	Heidi	
2022	Barbarian	Melissa	Voice
2022	House of Darkness	Mina Murray	
2022	The Enforcer	Estelle	
2023	Last Sentinel	Cpl. Cassidy	
2023	Confidential Informant	Anna Moran	
2023	The Locksmith	Beth Fisher	
2025	Coyotes	Liv	
TBA	Grave Encounters †		

=== Television ===
Year	Title	Role	Notes
1997	7th Heaven	Student in Background	2 episodes
2000	Young Americans	Bella Banks	
2015–2016	The Art of More	Roxanna Whitman	
2017	SS-GB	Barbara Barga	
2017	The Long Road Home	Gina Denomy	
2019	The I-Land	KC	Also producer

=== Video games ===
Year	Title	Voice role	Notes
2006	Superman Returns	Lois Lane	
2010	CR: Superman Returns	Lois Lane	
