= Hilary Dwyer =

British actress (1945–2020)

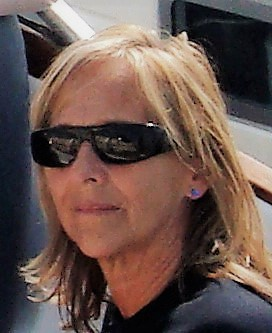
- Dwyer in 2009
- Born: 6 May 1945; Liverpool, England
- Died: 30 March 2020 (aged 74)
- Other name: Hilary Heath
- Education: Royal Central School of Speech and Drama
- Occupations: Actress, businessperson, film producer, addiction counsellor
- Years active: 1965–2014
- Spouse: Duncan Heath (m. 1974; div. 1989)
- Children: 2

Hilary Dwyer (6 May 1945 – 30 March 2020), also known as Hilary Heath, was an English actress, businessperson, and film producer. She was best known for her acting roles in films such as Witchfinder General (1968) and Wuthering Heights (1970). She also performed on the London stage. In 1974, she married the talent agent Duncan Heath, with whom she had two children, and helped to found Duncan Heath Associates, which was later bought by ICM Partners. They divorced in 1989. Later in her career, under her married name, "Hilary Heath", she produced the feature film An Awfully Big Adventure (1995), as well as TV remakes of Daphne du Maurier's Rebecca (1997) and Tennessee Williams's The Roman Spring of Mrs. Stone (2003). Her final producing role was the 2014 miniseries Jamaica Inn.

== Early life ==
Born on 6 May 1945, in Liverpool, England, Hilary Dwyer was the daughter of Frederick Dwyer, a South African-born orthopaedic surgeon noted for his pioneering calcaneal osteotomy, who married Norah Eileen Milroy in 1940. They had two daughters, Hilary and Patricia, the latter of whom would later marry the philosopher Bernard Williams. As a youth, Hilary practised ballet and became a talented pianist, winning a music scholarship to Lowther College in North Wales. At age 16 she attended the Webber Douglas Academy of Dramatic Art (now part of the Central School of Speech and Drama) in London. She trained in repertory theatres and appeared on stage at the Bristol Old Vic.

== Acting career ==
Dwyer is best known for appearing in several horror films distributed by American International Pictures in the late 1960s and early 1970s, most notably her first feature film, Michael Reeves' Witchfinder General (1968), starring Vincent Price, in which she played Sara Lowes, and gave a "sensitive performance...intelligent and articulate". Of the role, Dwyer later recalled "I don't think that I realised I was the star." Dwyer enjoyed working with Reeves, describing him as "terrific, we became really good friends". In a 2010 interview at the Southend Film Festival, Dwyer described her interview for Witchfinder General as her "first casting call", in which she was "absolutely terrified" because she "knew no-one".

Dwyer also appeared in The Oblong Box (1969) and Cry of the Banshee (1970), both again featuring Price. Of working with Price, she said "I adored Vincent...I played his mistress, his daughter and his wife. And he said, 'if you ever play my mother, I'll marry you'." Dwyer also performed in Robert Fuest's Wuthering Heights (1970). Cry of the Banshee was her final feature film appearance.

Her many television roles included The Prisoner, The Avengers, Hadleigh, Z-Cars, and Van der Valk. Her last TV appearance was in a 1976 episode of Space: 1999.

Dwyer also had a successful career on the stage. In 1970 she appeared in The Importance of Being Earnest and in Arms and the Man at the Theatre Royal, Bath, and later on tour with the Bristol Old Vic. In 1978 Dwyer performed in the play Whose Life Is It Anyway? alongside Tom Conti at the Mermaid Theatre in London, and later at the Savoy.

== Duncan Heath Associates, marriage and children ==
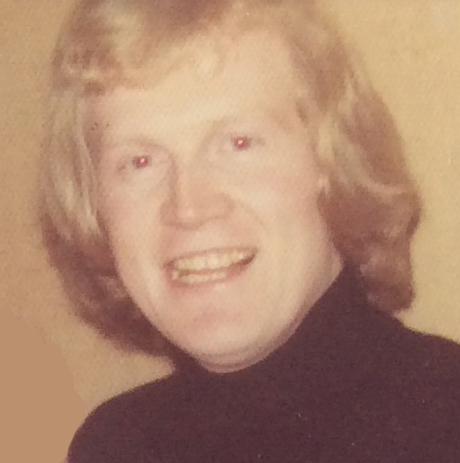
Duncan Heath

In 1973, she helped set up the talent agency Duncan Heath Associates with her then husband-to-be, Duncan Heath, working long hours to set up the business and even taking business calls on her wedding day. Duncan Heath Associates became a successful talent agency, and was later bought by ICM Partners. Today, Duncan Heath is co-chairman of the Independent Talent Group Ltd. In a 2002 interview in the Financial Times, Heath said of Dwyer "She introduced me to a lot of people – if it wasn't for her it wouldn't have happened." Dwyer married Heath in 1974; they had two children, Laura and Daniel. However, working with her husband was not always easy. The relationship was later described by Duncan Heath as "a nightmare", in part because of her strong personality and also because she had begun to drink heavily.

== Producing career ==
She began a career as a producer in the mid-1980s under her married name Hilary Heath. In 1988 she won a CableAce Award for the TV movie The Worst Witch (1986). Unfortunately her marriage did not prosper and she and her husband Duncan separated, and were divorced in 1989. Despite the divorce, she retained a relationship with her ex-husband, which continued to be the most important in her life, and the two continued to speak and meet regularly. She also embraced sobriety, giving up alcohol.

Heath is credited as either producer or executive producer for a number of feature films, including Criminal Law (1988) and An Awfully Big Adventure (1995), starring Hugh Grant and Alan Rickman. She co-produced Gary Oldman's 1997 film Nil by Mouth. She also produced TV-remakes of Daphne du Maurier's Rebecca (1997) and Tennessee Williams's The Roman Spring of Mrs. Stone (2003). In 2014 she executive produced the miniseries Jamaica Inn.

As a producer, she was skilled at managing talent. Jonathan Powell, former controller of BBC 1, said of her: "Everybody knew Hilary. And if they didn't, they couldn't stop her from getting to know them. She had a complete incapacity to understand what the word 'no' meant".

== Addiction counselling ==
Dywer returned to education in her mid 60s, studying cognitive behaviour therapy for a master's degree at the University of Oxford, and forging a new career as an addiction counsellor. She was reportedly a good counsellor, thanks to her frankness, and her openness about her own past struggles with addiction.

== Death and legacy ==
Dwyer died on 30 March 2020, aged 74, from complications related to COVID-19. The health crisis caused by the virus meant that Dwyer's funeral did not take place as she had hoped or planned. The only individuals present were her daughter Laura and the presiding vicar. She was survived by her two children, Laura and Daniel. Laura Heath founded the Hope-Martin Animal Foundation in Barbados. Daniel Heath is a Los Angeles-based film composer, writing songs for artists such as Lana Del Rey.

== Filmography ==
=== Feature films ===
Year	Film	Role	Director
1968	Witchfinder General	Sara Lowes	Michael Reeves
1969	The Body Stealers	Julie Slade	Gerry Levy
1969	The Oblong Box	Lady Elizabeth Markham	Gordon Hessler
1969	The File of the Golden Goose	Ann Marlowe	Sam Wanamaker
1969	Two Gentlemen Sharing	Ethne Burrows	Ted Kotcheff
1970	Wuthering Heights	Isabella Linton	Robert Fuest
1970	Cry of the Banshee	Maureen Whitman	Gordon Hessler

=== Television (incomplete) ===
Year	TV show	Role	Director
1965	About Religion	Gladys	
1967	ITV Play of the Week	Anthea	Christopher Hodson
1967	The Avengers	Hilary	Robert Asher
1967	The Prisoner	Number Seventy-Three	Pat Jackson
1968	Z-Cars	Rita Pearson	John Glenister
1969	Callan	Jenny Lauther	Robert Tronson
1969	Special Branch	Sarah Landring	Jonathan Alwyn
1972	Van der Valk	Nana Schneers	
1972	Man at the Top (TV series)	Kate Fielding	Don Leaver
1973	Hadleigh	Jennifer Caldwell	
1976	Space 1999	Laura Adams	Ray Austin
