= Lex Lutzus =

British film producer and financier (born 1980)

- Born: 1 October 1980 (age 46); London, England
- Other name: Lex Heath
- Years active: 2000-
- Spouse: Duncan Heath (m. 2013)
- Children: Jacob Heath (2013-), Edie Heath (2014-)

Lex Lutzus (born 1 October 1980) is a British film producer and financier. She is CEO of House of Heath Television, based in London. She is the producer of Still Alice for which Julianne Moore won the Oscar for best actress in 2015.

In 2017, House of Heath Television signed an overall deal with NBC Universal.

In 2019, Lutzus created Pod Almighty, a podcast network dedicated to talent-led podcast content.

== Career ==
Lutzus has more than fifteen years experience in the media and finance sector. She started her career in advertising, before going on to create a number of her own successful companies, ranging from fashion brands, art galleries, to film companies and funds.

She successfully helped raise more than £800m in equity investments for funds and media companies, as well as successfully overseeing more than 15 M&A deals.

Prior to becoming a film producer, Lutzus was Chief Operating Officer of British distribution company Tartan Films.

She is the founder and CEO of the production company House of Heath Television, creating premium television content in both the UK and the US, under a first-look deal with NBC Universal . In November 2016, Amblin Entertainment picked up the film rights to the graphic novel Dan and Sam. House of Heath Television will co-produce the film with US based production company Red Wagon Productions.

Lutzus is a co-owner of Docsville a documentary and OTT platform. Through her involvement with the company, she recently produced The Capote Tapes, a documentary exploring the impact of Truman Capote's explosive unfinished novel Answered Prayers which premiered at the 2019 Toronto International Film Festival.

== Personal life ==
Lutzus were married to Duncan Heath, chairman of Independent Talent Group Ltd. She has two young children, Jacob (b. 2013) and Edie (b. 2014). They have since divorced.
