= Still Alice =

2014 film by Richard Glatzer and Wash Westmoreland

- Theatrical release poster
- Directed by: Richard Glatzer; Wash Westmoreland
- Screenplay by: Richard Glatzer; Wash Westmoreland
- Based on: Still Alice by Lisa Genova
- Produced by: Lex Lutzus; James Brown; Pamela Koffler
- Starring: Julianne Moore; Alec Baldwin; Kristen Stewart; Kate Bosworth; Hunter Parrish
- Cinematography: Denis Lenoir
- Edited by: Nicolas Chaudeurge
- Music by: Ilan Eshkeri
- Production companies: Killer Films; Lutzus-Brown; BSM Studio; Big Indie Pictures; Shriver Films
- Distributed by: Sony Pictures Classics
- Release dates: September 8, 2014 (TIFF); January 16, 2015 (United States)
- Running time: 101 minutes
- Country: United States
- Language: English
- Budget: $4-5 million
- Box office: $44.8 million

Still Alice is a 2014 American tragedy film written and directed by Richard Glatzer and Wash Westmoreland and based on the 2007 novel by Lisa Genova. It stars Julianne Moore as Alice Howland, a linguistics professor diagnosed with familial Alzheimer's disease. Alec Baldwin plays her husband, John, and Kristen Stewart, Kate Bosworth, and Hunter Parrish play her children.

Glatzer and Westmoreland were approached by Lex Lutzus and James Brown to adapt Genova's novel in 2011, when Glatzer had just been diagnosed with amyotrophic lateral sclerosis (ALS). Moore was their first choice for Howland, and researched Alzheimer's disease for months to prepare. The film was shot in New York in March 2014, with a budget of $4 million.

Still Alice had its world premiere at the 2014 Toronto International Film Festival on September 8, 2014. It was one of several films stolen in the Sony Pictures hack and leaked online on November 27, 2014. The film was released theatrically on January 16, 2015, and grossed $43.9 million at the international box office. It received positive reviews, with praise for Moore's performance, which won awards including the Academy Award for Best Actress. She dedicated her Academy Award win to Glatzer, who died from ALS in March 2015. The film was included among the year's top ten independent films by the National Board of Review.

== Plot ==
Dr. Alice Howland, a linguistics professor at Columbia University, celebrates her 50th birthday with her physician husband John and their three adult children. After she forgets a word during a lecture and becomes lost during a jog on campus, Alice's doctor diagnoses her with early onset familial Alzheimer's disease. Alice's elder daughter, Anna, and son, Tom, take a genetic test to learn if they will develop the disease. Anna's test is positive, while Tom's is negative. Alice's younger daughter Lydia, an aspiring actress, declines to be tested.

As Alice's memory begins to fade, she daydreams of her mother and sister, who died in a car crash when she was a teenager. She memorizes words and sets a series of personal questions on her phone, which she answers every morning. She hides sleeping pills in her room, and records a video message instructing her future self to kill herself by overdosing on the pills when she can no longer answer the personal questions. As her disease advances, she becomes unable to give focused lectures and loses her job. She becomes lost searching for the bathroom in her home and does not recognize Lydia after seeing her perform in a play.

John is offered a job at the Mayo Clinic in Minnesota. Alice asks him to postpone accepting, but he feels this is impossible. At her doctor's suggestion, Alice delivers a speech at an Alzheimer's conference about her experience with the disease, using a highlighter to remind herself which parts of the speech she has already spoken, and receives a standing ovation.

Alice begins to have difficulty answering the questions on her phone. She loses the phone and becomes distressed. John finds it a month later in the freezer, but Alice thinks it has only been missing for a day.

After a video call with Lydia, Alice inadvertently opens the video with the suicide instructions. With some difficulty, she finds the pills and is about to swallow them, but when she is interrupted by the arrival of her caregiver, she drops the pills and forgets what she was doing.

John, unable to watch his wife deteriorate, moves to Minnesota. Lydia, who has been living in California, moves back home to care for Alice. Lydia reads her a section of the play Angels in America and asks her what she thinks it is about. Alice, now barely able to speak, responds with a single word: "love".

== Cast ==
- Julianne Moore as Alice Daly Howland
- Alec Baldwin as John Howland, Alice's husband
- Kristen Stewart as Lydia Howland, Alice's younger daughter
- Kate Bosworth as Anna Howland-Jones, Alice's eldest daughter
- Hunter Parrish as Tom Howland, Alice's middle son
- Shane McRae as Charlie Jones, Anna's husband
- Stephen Kunken as Dr. Benjamin
- Seth Gilliam as Frederic Johnson
- Daniel Gerroll as Eric Wellman
- Erin Darke as Jenny
- Kristin Macomber as Anne
- Caridad Montanez as Elena
- Eha Urbsalu as Mrs. Daly, Alice's mother

== Production ==
Still Alice is based on a novel of the same name published in 2007. The novel was written by Lisa Genova, a neuroscientist who was inspired by her grandmother's development of Alzheimer's disease to write about the disease from a firsthand perspective. British film producers Lex Lutzus and James Brown bought the rights to a film adaptation of the novel and pitched the project to their friends, filmmaking partners and married couple Richard Glatzer and Wash Westmoreland, in 2011. Glatzer and Westmoreland were initially hesitant to write and direct the film because Glatzer had just been diagnosed with amyotrophic lateral sclerosis (ALS); they thought that writing about Alzheimer's disease, another neurodegenerative disease, "may be a little too close to the bone". They ultimately took up the offer and wrote a screenplay based on Genova's novel in early 2012. Elements of the story were lifted from Glatzer's experience with ALS and Westmoreland's role as his primary caregiver.

Julianne Moore was Glatzer and Westmoreland's first choice for the lead role. Moore prepared for the role over four months, watching documentaries about Alzheimer's disease. She met with Elizabeth Gelfand Stearns, the co-producer of the film and the head of The Judy Fund, which partners with the Alzheimer's Association in the fight to cure Alzheimer's Disease. Introductions were made to Dr. Mary Sano, the director of Alzheimer's disease research at Mount Sinai Hospital. Through Skype, she talked to three women with early-onset Alzheimer's disease; she also visited a support group for women with Alzheimer's disease and a long-term care facility for Alzheimer's patients. She also undertook the cognitive testing used for diagnosing dementia with a neuropsychiatrist. Moore suggested Alec Baldwin to play Alice's husband, since they had previously worked together on the sitcom 30 Rock. Kate Bosworth was cast after she told Glatzer and Westmoreland "how important and personal the subject matter was" to her; she had family members with Alzheimer's disease and, after reading Genova's book, set out to become involved in the film adaptation.

Principal photography took place in New York over 23 days in March 2014. Most of the film was shot in a townhouse on West 162nd Street in Manhattan. Some scenes were filmed in an apartment building in Yonkers and a senior's home in Hastings-on-Hudson. The film was shot by French cinematographer Denis Lenoir, whom Glatzer and Westmoreland had met at a film screening in 1999; they had wanted to work with him ever since. During filming, Glatzer and Westmoreland attempted to divide the directing duties equally between themselves, even though Glatzer's physical condition had deteriorated to the point that he could only communicate by typing on an iPad with a single finger.

The production's $4–5 million budget was funded by the French financier BSM Studio. Post-production on the film was completed ten days before its premiere at the 2014 Toronto International Film Festival. The score was composed by Ilan Eshkeri, who wanted to work on Still Alice because of his experience with people affected by Alzheimer's disease in his personal life. He had worked on several Alzheimer's-related projects before, including the 2012 film Ashes, Tim Wheeler's 2014 album Lost Domain, and an advertising campaign for the Alzheimer's Society; he said of working on Still Alice, "in many ways this was a culmination of an artistic expression of something that has deeply touched me." Eshkeri wrote the score to be performed on piano, which he intended to represent Alice's family life, and by a string trio, of which he thought the challenge of composition was similar to "the challenge of coping with the disease".

== Release ==
Still Alice had its world premiere at the Toronto International Film Festival on September 8, 2014. Sony Pictures Classics, which bought the North American rights for the film, gave it a one-week release in December 2014 so that it would qualify for that year's Academy Awards. After making the deal with Sony, Westmoreland and Glatzer were eager to have the film released as early as possible, partly because of Glatzer's declining health. The film began its proper theatrical run with a limited release on January 16, 2015, earning $197,000 from 12 locations on its opening weekend. On February 20, it was given a wide release, expanding to 765 theaters across the U.S. Overall, the film grossed $18,754,371 over 14 weeks in American theaters. It earned $25,130,281 in other countries for a worldwide gross of $43,884,652.

=== Piracy ===
The film was part of the confidential data stolen in the Sony Pictures hack incident; it was leaked onto peer-to-peer file sharing websites on November 27, 2014, over a month ahead of its scheduled release. Along with it came Fury and three other unreleased Sony Pictures films (Annie, Mr. Turner, and To Write Love on Her Arms). Within three days of the leak, Still Alice had been downloaded by an estimated 103,832 unique IP addresses.

== Reception ==
=== Critical response ===
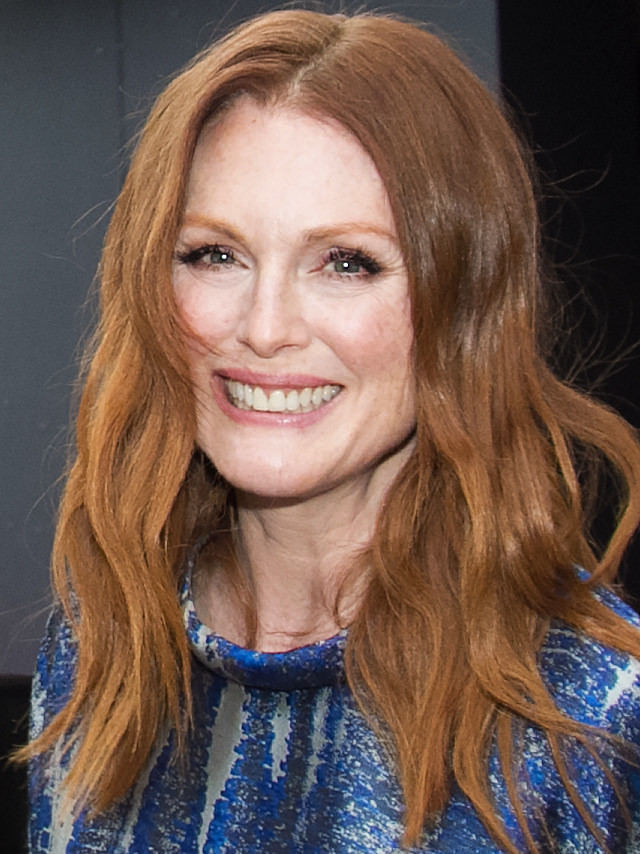
Julianne Moore's performance won her the Academy Award for Best Actress, the first of her career after four previous nominations.

On the review aggregator website Rotten Tomatoes, Still Alice holds an approval rating of 85% based on 206 reviews, with an average rating of 7.4/10. The site's consensus reads, "Elevated by a gripping performance from Julianne Moore, Still Alice is a heartfelt drama that honors its delicate themes with bravery and sensitivity." On Metacritic assigned the film a weighted average score of 72 out of 100 based on 41 critics, indicating "generally favorable reviews".

Rolling Stone critic Peter Travers wrote of "the blazing artistry" of Moore's performance, which he said was "alive with ferocity and feeling and committed to truth". Mick LaSalle of the San Francisco Chronicle described Moore's portrayal of Alice as "convincing, disturbing and personal", while Entertainment Weekly's Chris Nashawaty cited it as being "among her most devastating performances". In a review for The Globe and Mail, Liam Lacey wrote of her "transparent emotional presence", though he felt that "the part [of Alice] barely scratches the surface of her ability". The Daily Telegraph critic Tim Robey felt that Moore's "astonishingly delicate and sad" performance was one of her career highlights, and characterized the film as a whole as "gorgeous [and] piercing".

Empire magazine's David Hughes gave Still Alice five out of five, highlighting Moore's "note-perfect performance" and Glatzer and Westmoreland's "sensitivity and scalpel-sharp precision". Deborah Young, reviewing the film for The Hollywood Reporter, praised the directors' "restrained, understated approach" to the story, which she saw as "the best insurance against sloppy sentimentality". The Los Angeles Times critic Kenneth Turan attributed the film's success to Moore and Stewart's ability "to keep things honest" despite parts of it seeming "contrived and overly familiar". Peter Debruge of Variety complimented Glatzer and Westmoreland's "dignified" and "personal" approach to the subject matter, as well as their decision to tell the story from Alice's point of view.

Other critics gave the film lukewarm reviews. A. O. Scott of The New York Times praised Moore's and Stewart's performances, but felt that the story was "too removed from life to carry the full measure of pain that Alice deserves". The New Yorker critic Anthony Lane criticized Glatzer and Westmoreland for "flinch[ing]" when it came to showing Alice's deterioration and its effect on her family, and found the film's sentimental aspects "manipulative—and effective". The Austin Chronicle's Josh Kupecki gave the film two and a half out of five, finding it clichéd and melodramatic, and likening it to a public service announcement. Richard Roeper, writing for the Chicago Sun-Times, described Moore as giving "a four-star performance in a two-star movie", drawing attention to the "intrusive" score and the "maddeningly overwrought and heavy-handed" storytelling.

=== Accolades ===
For her performance as Alice Howland, Julianne Moore won the Academy Award, BAFTA Award, Golden Globe Award, Screen Actors Guild Award, and Critics' Choice Movie Award. Still Alice marked her first Academy Award win after four previous nominations. Moore dedicated her Academy Award win to Glatzer, who died from ALS several weeks later on March 10, 2015. Although she was widely considered to be the Best Actress frontrunner in anticipation of the Academy Awards ceremony, some critics felt that Still Alice was not among Moore's greatest performances and did not deserve to win. In 2024, Moore said that Marion Cotillard deserved to win the Academy Award for Two Days, One Night (2014) more than she did.

List of accolades
| Award / Film Festival | Category | Recipient(s) | Result | Ref(s) |
|---|---|---|---|---|
| Academy Awards | Best Actress | Julianne Moore | Won | |
| Alliance of Women Film Journalists | Best Actress | Julianne Moore | Won | |
| AACTA International Awards | Best Lead Actress | Julianne Moore | Won | |
| British Academy Film Awards | Best Actress in a Leading Role | Julianne Moore | Won | |
| Chicago Film Critics Association Awards | Best Actress | Julianne Moore | Won | |
| Critics' Choice Movie Awards | Best Actress | Julianne Moore | Won | |
| Dallas–Fort Worth Film Critics Association | Best Actress | Julianne Moore | Runner-up | |
| Detroit Film Critics Society | Best Actress | Julianne Moore | Nominated | |
| Dorian Awards | Best Actress | Julianne Moore | Won | |
| Dublin Film Critics' Circle | Best Actress | Julianne Moore | Won | |
| Florida Film Critics Circle | Best Actress | Julianne Moore | Runner-up | |
| Golden Globe Awards | Best Actress in a Motion Picture – Drama | Julianne Moore | Won | |
| Gotham Independent Film Awards | Best Actress | Julianne Moore | Won | |
| Hollywood Film Awards | Hollywood Actress Award | Julianne Moore | Won | |
| Houston Film Critics Society | Best Actress | Julianne Moore | Won | |
| Humanitas Prize | Feature Film | Wash Westmoreland and Richard Glatzer | Won | |
| Independent Spirit Awards | Best Female Lead | Julianne Moore | Won | |
| Irish Film & Television Awards | International Actress | Julianne Moore | Won | |
| London Film Critics Circle Awards | Actress of the Year | Julianne Moore | Won | |
| Los Angeles Film Critics Association Awards | Best Actress | Julianne Moore | Runner-up | |
| MPSE Golden Reel Awards | Feature English Language – Dialogue/ADR | Javier Bennassar | Nominated | |
| National Board of Review | Best Actress | Julianne Moore | Won | |
| National Board of Review | Top 10 Independent Films | Still Alice | Won | |
| National Society of Film Critics | Best Actress | Julianne Moore | Runner-up | |
| Online Film Critics Society | Best Actress | Julianne Moore | Nominated | |
| Palm Springs International Film Festival | Desert Palm Achievement Award | Julianne Moore | Won | |
| San Francisco Film Critics Circle | Best Actress | Julianne Moore | Won | |
| Satellite Awards | Best Actress – Motion Picture | Julianne Moore | Won | |
| Screen Actors Guild Awards | Outstanding Performance by a Female Actor in a Leading Role | Julianne Moore | Won | |
| St. Louis Gateway Film Critics Association | Best Actress | Julianne Moore | Nominated | |
| Teen Choice Awards | Choice Movie Actress: Drama | Kristen Stewart | Nominated | |
| Toronto Film Critics Association | Best Actress | Julianne Moore | Runner-up | |
| Washington D.C. Area Film Critics Association | Best Actress | Julianne Moore | Won | |
| Women Film Critics Circle | Best Actress | Julianne Moore | Won | |
| Women Film Critics Circle | Courage in Acting | Julianne Moore | Won | |
| Women Film Critics Circle | Best Movie About Women | Still Alice | Won | |
