= Michael Mullan =

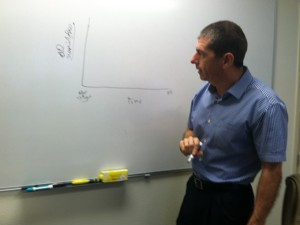
- Mullan describing how the Brain Reserve Index works
- Born: Michael John Mullan; November 14, 1956 (age 69); Farnborough, Kent, U.K.
- Years active: 1985–present
- Title: CEO of Archer Pharmaceuticals; Executive Director of the Roskamp Institute
- Website: www.mullanalzheimer.com

Michael Mullan is an English-American researcher in Alzheimer's disease and related neurodegenerative disorders. Mullan was a co-discoverer of genetic causes of Alzheimer's disease. Subsequently, he was a co-inventor on the original patents that covered three mutations in the amyloid precursor protein (APP) gene, a gene which is linked to familial Alzheimer's disease. He also co-authored articles in Nature and Nature Genetics, describing these three genetic errors; he was the senior author on two of those articles. Dr. Mullan co-discovered a specific genetic mutation, which became known as "the Swedish Mutation," because it was originally identified in DNA samples from two Swedish families whose members often developed early-onset Alzheimer's disease. These human genetic mutations were integrated into mouse DNA to create strains of mice (transgenic animal models) that are being used worldwide to develop new drug treatments for Alzheimer's disease.

Mullan was trained as a physician in England receiving his medical degree from the Royal Free Hospital, London University. As a physician, he won a clinical research fellowship in the UK and subsequently gained a PhD in molecular genetics, also from London University. In the UK and US he specialized in the diagnosis and treatment of Alzheimer's disease. He has co-authored over 200 papers on Alzheimer's disease and related disorders—on many of which he served as senior author. He has held positions as Professorial Chair and positions as professor of psychiatry, Neurology, and Pathology. He cofounded the Roskamp Institute, a not-for-profit, stand-alone biomedical research Institute and was its Director and CEO. Mullan was the CEO and chairman of Rock Creek Pharmaceuticals. Mullan is the CEO of Archer Pharmaceuticals, a for-profit spin-off of the Roskamp Institute. His work has focused on the development of new treatments for inflammatory disorders, particularly of the brain, with the ultimate goal of "reducing the burden of human suffering" associated with these diseases.

== Co-founding the Roskamp Institute ==
Mullan and Crawford cofounded the Roskamp Institute with developer and philanthropist Mr. Robert Roskamp in Sarasota Florida in 2003. Mullan and Crawford wanted to name the institute after Mr. Roskamp and his family in recognition of their extensive contributions to the advancement of scientific research to find new treatments for neurological and psychiatric disorders. The institute was established as a standalone biomedical state-of-the-art research facility to find the causes and new treatments for neuropsychiatric conditions. In the mission statement of the Institute Mullan chose the phrase "to reduce the burden of human suffering" in reference to the mental and physical devastation that such conditions as Alzheimer's cause. The institute is a multicultural multi-ethnic research environment combining a wide variety of expertise in molecular and cell biology, genetics, proteomics, lipidomics, medicinal chemistry, drug discovery and development. The institute is a not-for-profit public charity funded variously by national peer-reviewed grants from the Department of Defense, the NIH, the Veterans Administration and other agencies.

Under the directorships of Mullan and Crawford the Roskamp Institute focuses on discovering new treatments for Alzheimer's disease, traumatic brain injury, multiple sclerosis, Gulf War illness and other central nervous system disorders.

== Swedish mutation patent litigation ==
The patents covering the Swedish Mutation were the subject of extensive litigation due to their commercial value. In one case brought by AIA against Eli Lilly (in which Mullan was an expert witness) the United States District Court for the Eastern District of Pennsylvania found that another individual, John Hardy was a co-inventor on the Swedish mutation patent. The patent was initially filed listing Mullan as the sole inventor at Hardy's suggestion (Hardy was Mullan's PhD supervisor). Hardy was employed by Imperial College at the time. This strategy successfully allowed Lilly and Avid to invalidate the patent. British patent law stipulates that such inventions would be owned by the employer and not the employee.
