= Early-onset Alzheimer's disease =

Alzheimer's disease developed before the age of 65

- Other names: EOAD; Younger-onset Alzheimer's disease; YOAD
- Specialty: Neurology

Early-onset Alzheimer's disease (EOAD), also called younger-onset Alzheimer's disease (YOAD), is Alzheimer's disease diagnosed before the age of 65. It is an uncommon form of Alzheimer's, accounting for only 5–10% of all Alzheimer's cases. About 60% of cases have a positive family history of Alzheimer's and 13% of them are inherited in an autosomal dominant manner. Most cases of early-onset Alzheimer's share the same traits as the "late-onset" form and are not caused by known genetic mutations. Little is understood about how it starts.

Nonfamilial early-onset AD can develop in people who are in their 30s or 40s, but this is extremely rare, and mostly people in their 50s or early 60s are affected.

== Familial and nonfamilial Alzheimer's disease ==
Alzheimer's disease (AD) is a neurodegenerative disease and the most common cause of dementia; it usually occurs in old age. Familial Alzheimer's disease (FAD or EOFAD for early onset) is an inherited and uncommon form of AD. Familial AD usually strikes earlier in life, defined as before the age of 65. FAD usually implies multiple persons affected in one or more generation. Nonfamilial cases of AD are referred to as "sporadic" AD, where genetic risk factors are minor or unclear. Familial Alzheimer's accounts for 10–15% of all EOAD cases. The rest are sporadic and not based on genetic mutations.

== Signs and symptoms ==
Early-onset Alzheimer's disease strikes earlier in life, defined as before the age of 65 (usually between 30 and 60 years of age). Early signs of AD include unusual memory loss, particularly in remembering recent events and the names of people and things (logopenic primary progressive aphasia). As the disease progresses, the patient exhibits more serious problems, becoming subject to mood swings and unable to perform complex activities such as driving. Other common findings include confusion, poor judgement, language disturbance, agitation, withdrawal, hallucinations, seizures, Parkinsonian deficits, decreased muscle tone, myoclonus, urinary incontinence, fecal incontinence and mutism. In the later stages of EOAD, persons with EOAD forget how to perform simple tasks such as brushing their hair and require full-time care.

== Causes ==
Familial AD is inherited in an autosomal dominant fashion, identified by genetics and other characteristics such as the age of onset.

=== Genetics ===
Familial AD is inherited in an autosomal dominant fashion.

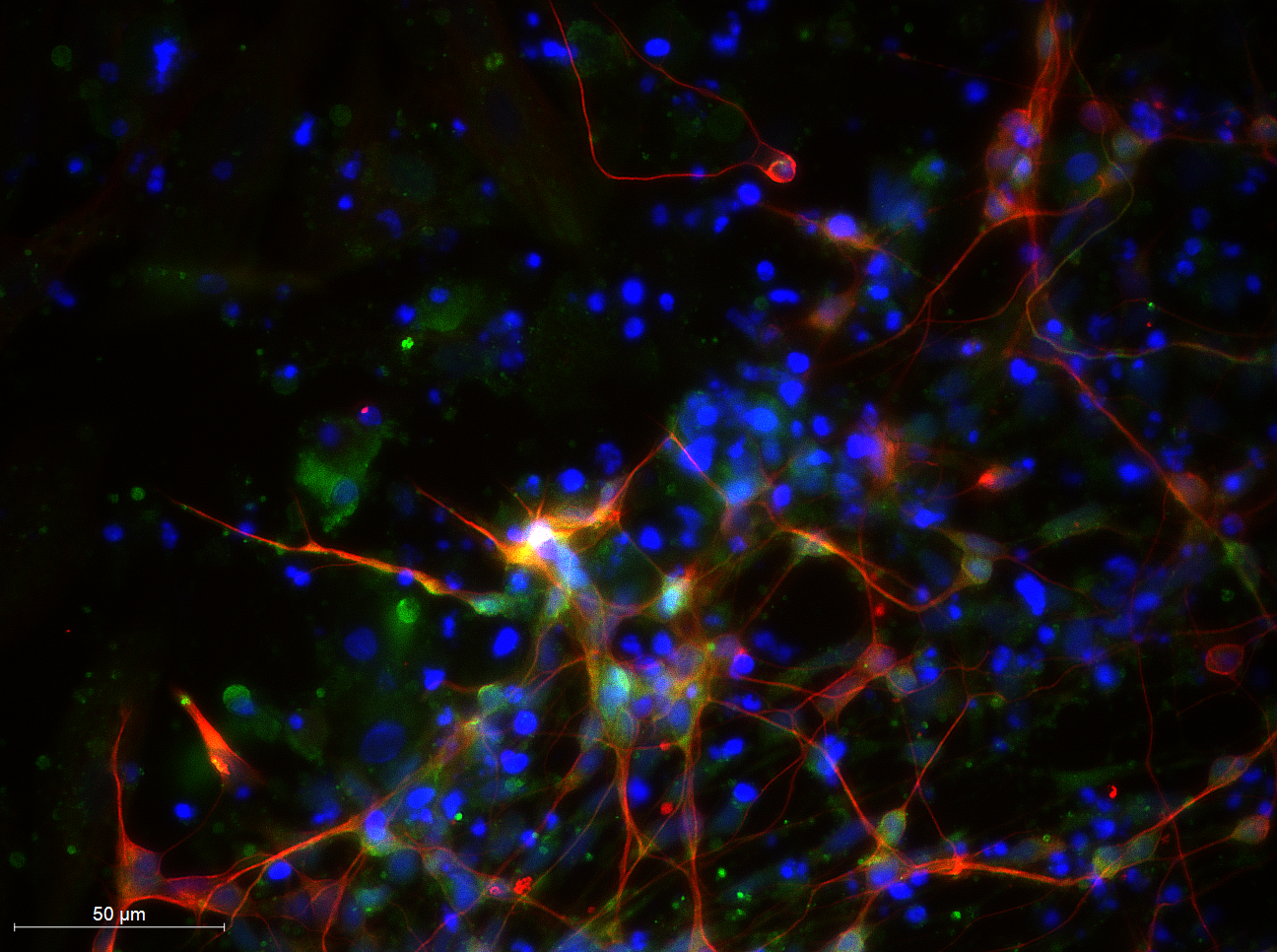
Forebrain neuronal culture after 40 days of differentiation from induced human pluripotent stem cells. iPSCs from a patient with familial Alzheimer's disease, a mutation in the PSEN1 gene. TUJ-1-positive cells express a marker (β3-tubulin) of mature neurons (red). GABA-positive cells (green). Cell nuclei are stained with DAPI (blue).

Familial Alzheimer disease is caused by a mutation in one of at least three genes, which code for presenilin 1, presenilin 2, and APP.

==== PSEN1 – Presenilin 1 ====
The presenilin 1 gene (PSEN1 located on chromosome 14) was identified by Sherrington (1995) and multiple mutations have been identified. Mutations in this gene cause familial Alzheimer's type 3 with certainty and usually under 50 years old. This type accounts for 30–70% of EOFAD. This protein has been identified as part of the enzymatic complex that cleaves amyloid-beta peptide from APP.

The gene contains 14 exons, and the coding portion is estimated at 60 kb, as reported by Rogaev (1997) and Del-Favero (1999). The protein the gene codes for (PS1) is an integral membrane protein. As stated by Ikeuchi (2002) it cleaves the protein Notch1 so is thought by Koizumi (2001) to have a role in somitogenesis in the embryo. It also has an action on an amyloid precursor protein, which gives its probable role in the pathogenesis of FAD. Homologs of PS1 have been found in plants, invertebrates and other vertebrates.

Some of the mutations in the gene, of which over 90 are known, include: His163Arg, Ala246Glu, Leu286Val and Cys410Tyr. Most display complete penetrance, but a common mutation is Glu318Gly and this predisposes individuals to familial AD, with a study by Taddei (2002) finding an incidence of 8.7% in patients with familial AD.

==== PSEN2 – Presenilin 2 ====
The presenilin 2 gene (PSEN2) is very similar in structure and function to PSEN1. It is located on chromosome 1 (1q31-q42), and mutations in this gene cause type 4 FAD. This type accounts for less than 5% of all EOFAD cases. The gene was identified by Rudolph Tanzi and Jerry Schellenberg in 1995. A subsequent study by Kovacs (1996) showed that PS1 and PS2 proteins are expressed in similar amounts, and in the same organelles as each other, in mammalian neuronal cells. Levy-Lahad (1996) determined that PSEN2 contained 12 exons, 10 of which were coding exons, and that the primary transcript encodes a 448-amino-acid polypeptide with 67% homology to PS1. This protein has been identified as part of the enzymatic complex that cleaves amyloid beta peptide from APP (see below).

The mutations have not been studied as much as PSEN1, but distinct allelic variants have been identified. These include Asn141Ile, which was identified first by Rudolph Tanzi and Jerry Schellenberg in Volga German families with familial Alzheimer disease (Levy-Lahad et al. Nature, 1995). One of these studies by Nochlin (1998) found severe amyloid angiopathy in the affected individuals in a family. This phenotype may be explained by a study by Tomita (1997) suggesting that the Asn141Ile mutation alters APP metabolism causing an increased rate of protein deposition into plaques.

Other allelic variants are Met239Val which was identified in an Italian pedigree by Rogaev (1995) who also suggested early on that the gene may be similar to PSEN1, and an Asp439Ala mutation in exon 12 of the gene which is suggested by Lleo (2001) to change the endoproteolytic processing of the PS2.

==== APP – amyloid beta (A4) precursor protein ====
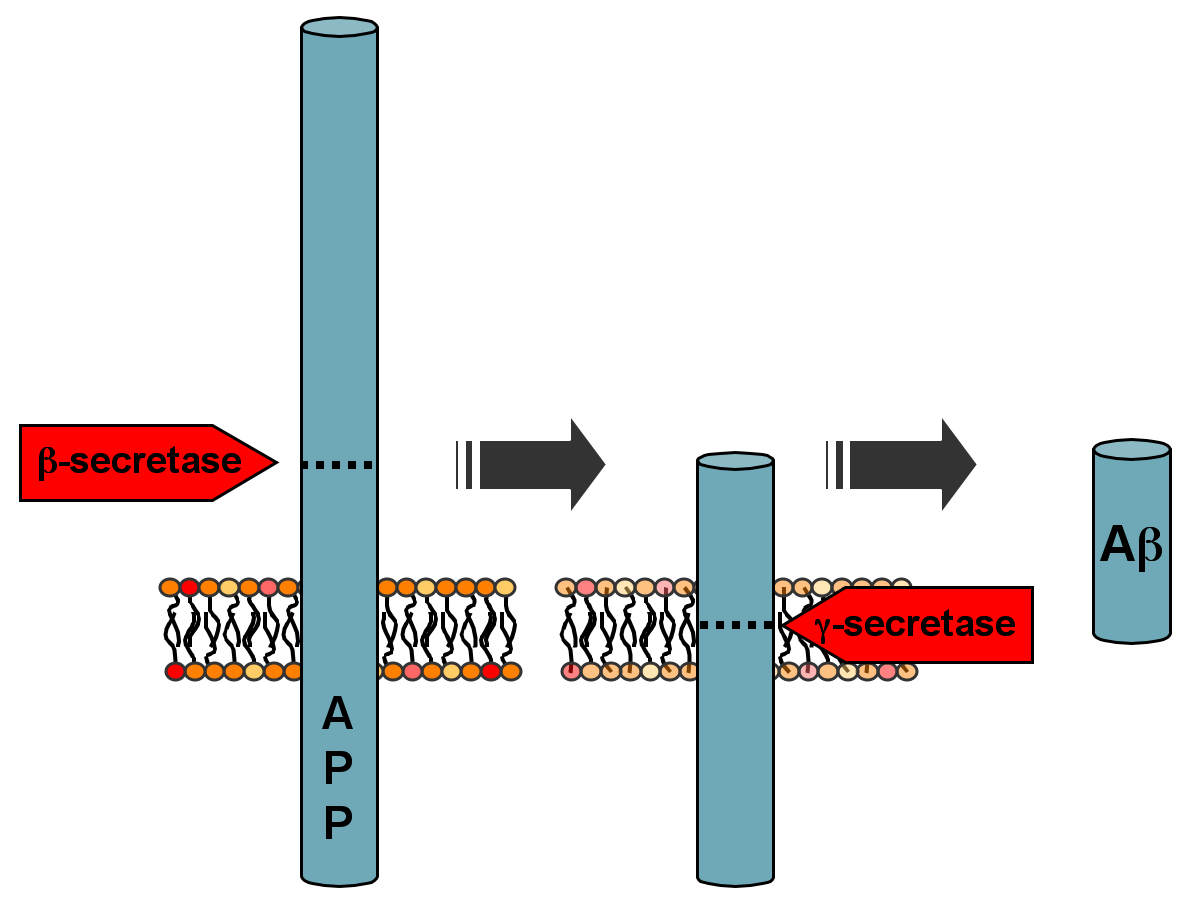
Processing of the amyloid precursor protein

Mutations to the amyloid beta A4 precursor protein (APP) located on the long arm of chromosome 21 (21q21.3) cause familial Alzheimer disease. This type accounts for no more than 10–15% of EOFAD.

As of 2023, the count of known pathogenic APP mutations stands at just over 20. The most prevalent among these mutations - APP V717I, known as the London Mutation - was first identified in 1991 within the family of Carol Jennings by a research team led by John Hardy. Other notable APP mutations include the Swedish (K670M/N671L) and Arctic (E693G) mutations.

Functional analyses of these mutations have significantly increased the understanding of the disease pathogenesis. Whereas the Swedish mutation, located at the cleavage site for β-secretase, results in an overall higher production of Aβ peptides by increasing the β-secretory cleavage, the London mutation, as well as other mutations in the APP at codon 717, shifts the ratio of toxic Aβ species to the more aggregate-prone 42 amino-acid length peptide, while the Arctic mutation leads to a conformation change of the Aβ peptide and increased formation of toxic Aβ protofibrils.

=== Non-genetic risk factors ===
Non-genetic risk factors for early onset sporadic Alzheimer's disease and other forms of early onset dementia are understudied. However, recent research suggests that there are multiple modifiable and nonmodifiable risk factors for young onset dementia.

=== Mechanism ===
Histologically, familial AD is practically indistinguishable from other forms of the disease. Deposits of amyloid can be seen in sections of brain tissue. This amyloid protein forms plaques and neurofibrillary tangles that progress through the brain. Very rarely, the plaque may be unique, or uncharacteristic of AD; this can happen when a mutation occurs in one of the genes that creates a functional, but malformed, protein instead of the ineffective gene products that usually result from mutations.

The underlying neurobiology of this disease is just recently starting to be understood. Researchers have been working on mapping the inflammation pathways associated with the development, progression, and degenerative properties of AD. The major molecules involved in these pathways include glial cells (specifically astrocytes and microglia), beta-amyloid, and proinflammatory compounds. As neurons are injured and die throughout the brain, connections between networks of neurons may break down, and many brain regions begin to shrink. By the final stages of Alzheimer's, this process – called brain atrophy – is widespread, causing significant loss of brain volume. This loss of brain volume affects ones ability to live and function properly, ultimately being fatal.

Beta-amyloid is a small piece of a larger protein called amyloid precursor protein (APP). Once APP is activated, it is cut into smaller sections of other proteins. One of the fragments produced in this cutting process is β-amyloid. β-amyloid is "stickier" than any other fragment produced from cut-up APP, so it starts an accumulation process in the brain, which is due to various genetic and biochemical abnormalities. Eventually, the fragments form oligomers, then fibrils, beta-sheets, and finally plaques. The presence of β-amyloid plaques in the brain causes the body to recruit and activate microglial cells and astrocytes.

Following cleavage by β-secretase, APP is cleaved by a membrane-bound protein complex called γ-secretase to generate Aβ. Presenilins 1 and 2 are the enzymatic centers of this complex along with nicastrin, Aph1, and PEN-2. Alpha-secretase cleavage of APP, which precludes the production of Aβ, is the most common processing event for APP. 21 allelic mutations have been discovered in the APP gene. These guarantee onset of early-onset familial Alzheimer disease and all occur in the region of the APP gene that encodes the Aβ domain.

=== Genetic testing ===
Genetic testing is available for symptomatic individuals and asymptomatic relatives. Among families with EOFAD, 40–80% will have a detectable mutation in the APP, PSEN1, or PSEN2 gene. Therefore, some families with EOFAD will not have an identifiable mutation by testing.

== Prognosis ==
The atypical lifecourse timing of early-onset Alzheimer's means that it presents distinctive impacts upon quality of life. For example, the disease can have devastating effects on the careers, caretakers and family members of patients.

Younger people with Alzheimer's may also lose their ability to take care of their own needs, such as money management. Studies indicate that cognitive rehabilitation can be beneficial in supporting the everyday functioning of those with EOAD.

It has been suggested that conceptualizations of Alzheimer's and ageing should resist the notion that there are two distinct conditions. A binary model, which focuses in particular on the needs of younger people, could lead to the challenges experienced by older people being understated.

== History ==
The symptoms of Alzheimer's disease as a distinct nosologic entity were first identified by Emil Kraepelin, who worked in Alzheimer's laboratory, and the characteristic neuropathology was first observed by Alois Alzheimer in 1906. Because of the overwhelming importance Kraepelin attached to finding the neuropathological basis of psychiatric disorders, Kraepelin made the decision that the disease would bear Alzheimer's name.

== Research directions ==
While early-onset familial AD is estimated to account for only 1% of total Alzheimer's disease, it has presented a useful model in studying various aspects of the disorder. Currently, the early-onset familial AD gene mutations guide the vast majority of animal model-based therapeutic discovery and development for AD. Human genes carrying mutations associated with familial AD are put into lab animals in hope of replicating some important aspects of Alzheimer's disease. The classic example is Tg2576 mice overexpressing the Swedish mutation. Many other effective models exist.

== See also ==
- Still Alice (novel) and the movie Still Alice, whose main protagonist has EOAD
- Spirit Unforgettable, a documentary film about the farewell tour of musician John Mann and his band Spirit of the West following his diagnosis with early-onset Alzheimer's
- Thanmathra (film), an award-winning Indian film detailing the effects of early-onset Alzheimer's disease on a father and his relationship with his son.
