= University of Toronto Medical Journal =

The University of Toronto Medical Journal (UTMJ) was founded in 1923, and is Canada's oldest student-run medical journal. All submissions are peer-reviewed before publication.
