= List of autistic fictional characters =

This is a list of fictional characters that have been explicitly described within the work in which they appear, or otherwise by the author, as being autistic. It is not intended to include speculation. Autistic people involved in the work may be mentioned in footnotes.

== Comics ==
| Year | Character | Series/Franchise | Author/Publisher | Country | Ref. |
|---|---|---|---|---|---|
| 1986 | Johnny Do | Psi-Force | Marvel Comics | USA | |
| 1996 | Claudette St. Croix | Generation X | Marvel Comics | USA | |
| 2000 | Hikaru Azuma | With the Light: Raising an Autistic Child | Keiko Tobe | Japan | |
| 2001 | Reed Richards | Fantastic Four | Marvel Comics | USA | |
| 2003 | Black Manta | Aquaman | DC Comics | USA | |
| 2007 | Zone | Special Forces | Kyle Baker | USA | |
| 2014 | Stephanie "Stephie" Bondu | Assigned Male | Sophie Labelle (Note: Labelle is autistic herself.) | Canada | |
| 2015 | Mark Shiffron | Postal | Top Cow Productions | USA | |
| 2015 | Huck | Huck | Mark Millar | Scotland/USA | |
| 2016 | Brun Khoury | Questionable Content | Jeph Jacques (Note: Jacques is self-diagnosed autistic.) | USA | |
| 2016 | Emma | Jade Street Protection Services | Black Mask Studios | USA | |
| 2016 | Marguerite | Invisible Differences | Julie Dachez, Mademoiselle Caroline | France | |
| 2017 | Scarlet Saltee | Archie | Archie Comics | USA | |
| 2018 | Norma Khan | Deadendia: The Watcher's Test | Nobrow | UK | |
| 2019 | Poison Ivy (as written by Tee Franklin) (Note: Franklin is autistic herself.) | Harley Quinn | DC Comics | USA | |
| 2022 | Frankie | Frankie's World | Aoife Dooley (Note: Dooley is autistic herself.) | Ireland | |
| 2022 | Mia / Elle-Q | Speak Up! | Rebecca Burgess (Note: Burgess is autistic.) / HarperCollins | USA | |
| 2023 | Val | The Ojja-Wojja | Magdalene Visaggio, Jenn St-Onge | USA | |

== Film ==
| Year | Character | Actor | Film | Country | Ref. |
|---|---|---|---|---|---|
| 1969 | Amanda | Lorena Kirk | Change of Habit | USA | |
| 1984 | Mario | Xavier Petermann | Mario | Canada | |
| 1986 | Eric Gibb | Jay Underwood | The Boy Who Could Fly | USA | |
| 1988 | Raymond "Ray" Babbitt | Dustin Hoffman | Rain Man | USA | |
| 1990 | Shane Costello | John and Joseph Vizzi | Backstreet Dreams | USA | |
| 1993 | Randall Eberlin | Jamie Harrold | Family Pictures | USA | |
| 1993 | Sally Matthews | Asha Menina | House of Cards | USA | |
| 1994 | Michael Barth | Bradley Pierce | Cries from the Heart | USA | |
| 1994 | David Goodson | Michael A. Goorjian and Steve Ivany (Note: Ivany is autistic himself.) | David's Mother | USA | |
| 1994 | Henry | Gary Farmer | Henry & Verlin | Canada | |
| 1994 | Verlin | Keegan MacIntosh | Henry & Verlin | Canada | |
| 1994 | Tim Warden | Ben Faulkner | Silent Fall | USA | |
| 1994 | Gregory White | Keegan MacIntosh | The Innocent | USA | |
| 1995 | Rosetta Basilio | Megan Follows | Under the Piano | USA | |
| 1997 | Chuy | Alexander Goodwin | Mimic | USA | |
| 1998 | Simon Lynch | Miko Hughes | Mercury Rising | USA | |
| 1998 | Meaghan Robinson | Laura Harling | Nightworld: Lost Souls | USA | |
| 1998 | Tracy Sinclair | Kulani Hassen | Down in the Delta | USA/Canada | |
| 1999 | Molly McKay | Elisabeth Shue | Molly | USA | |
| 2000 | Cody O'Connor | Holliston Coleman | Bless the Child | USA | |
| 2002 | Chloé | Adèle Haenel | Les Diables | France | |
| 2003 | Dewa | Dicky Lebrianto | Biola Tak Berdawai | Indonesia | |
| 2003 | Nicky Shields | Jamie Martin | Hear the Silence | UK | |
| 2004 | Vernon Jackson | Lucas Black | Killer Diller | USA | |
| 2004 | Jovana | Jovana Mitic (Note: Mitic is autistic herself.) | Midwinter Night's Dream | Serbia | |
| 2004 | Karl | Blake Pittman | Somersault | Australia | |
| 2004 | Steven Morgan | Zac Efron | Miracle Run | USA | |
| 2004 | Philip Morgan | Thomas Lewis | Miracle Run | USA | |
| 2005 | Cho-won | Cho Seung-woo | Marathon | South Korea | |
| 2005 | Rama Krishna | Jiiva | Raam | India | |
| 2005 | Donald Morton | Josh Hartnett | Mozart and the Whale | USA | |
| 2005 | Isabelle Sorenson | Radha Mitchell | Mozart and the Whale | USA | |
| 2006 | Bea | Poppy Rogers | Breaking and Entering | USA/UK | |
| 2006 | Linda Freeman | Sigourney Weaver | Snow Cake | Canada/UK | |
| 2006 | Kyle Graham | Andrew Byrne | After Thomas | UK | |
| 2007 | Ben | Greg Timmermans | Ben X | Belgium/Netherlands | |
| 2007 | Daniel Connelly | Harry Connick Jr. | P.S. I Love You | USA | |
| 2007 | Anna Woodruff | Nikki Haddad | Imagination | USA | |
| 2007 | Sarah Woodruff | Jessi Haddad | Imagination | USA | |
| 2008 | Charlie Mollison | Luke Ford | The Black Balloon | Australia | |
| 2008 | Poppy | Lizzy Clark (Note: Clark is autistic themself.) | Dustbin Baby | UK | |
| 2008 | Noah Connelly | Michael Worth | God's Ears | USA | |
| 2008 | Sarah | Skye Bennett | Dark Floors | Finland | |
| 2008 | Zen | Yanin Vismitananda | Chocolate | Thailand | |
| 2008 | Nelson Hodge | Alvin Keith | If You Could Say It in Words | USA | |
| 2009 | Charles | Gabriel Gaudreault | Suzie | Canada | |
| 2009 | Chris | James Lance | City Rats | UK | |
| 2009 | Max Horowitz | Philip Seymour Hoffman (Note: Narrator Barry Humphries was autistic himself.) | Mary and Max | Australia | |
| 2009 | Adam Raki | Hugh Dancy | Adam | USA | |
| 2010 | Dafu | Wen Zhang | Ocean Heaven | Hong Kong | |
| 2010 | Rizwan Khan | Shahrukh Khan | My Name Is Khan | India/USA/UAE/Hong Kong | |
| 2010 | Mandy | Ashley Rickards | Fly Away | USA | |
| 2010 | Tom Taylor | Charlie Tahan | Burning Bright | USA | |
| 2010 | Alan Wheddon | Braeden Reed and Luke Benward (Note: Reed is autistic himself.) | Dear John | USA | |
| 2010 | Simon | Bill Skarsgård | Simple Simon | Sweden | |
| 2011 | Alfred Jones | Ewan McGregor | Salmon Fishing in the Yemen | UK | |
| 2011 | Dana Minor | Devon Graye | Exodus Fall | USA | |
| 2011 | Yoav Pomerantz | Michael Hanegbi | Dr. Pomerantz | Israel | |
| 2011 | Tomer Roshko | Michael Moshonov | Mabul | Israel | |
| 2011 | Oskar Schell | Thomas Horn | Extremely Loud and Incredibly Close | USA | |
| 2011 | Mickey Tussler | Luke Schroder | A Mile in His Shoes | Canada | |
| 2012 | Jhilmil Chatterjee | Priyanka Chopra | Barfi! | India | |
| 2012 | Walter Hill | Dexter Darden | Joyful Noise | USA | |
| 2012 | Luke | Lou Taylor Pucci | The Story of Luke | USA | |
| 2012 | Zack | Seth Green | The Story of Luke | USA | |
| 2012 | Nick Young | Booboo Stewart | White Frog | USA | |
| 2013 | Duncan | Chris Marquette | The Odd Way Home | USA | |
| 2013 | Haridas | Prithviraj Das | Haridas | India | |
| 2013 | Rafer | Grayson Russell | Season of Miracles | USA | |
| 2013 | Ricky | Jesus Sanchez-Velez (Note: Sanchez-Velez is autistic himself.) | Stand Clear of the Closing Doors | USA | |
| 2013 | Ataru | Masahiro Nakai | Ataru: The First Love & the Last Kill | Japan | |
| 2013 | Alessandro Carolina Madoka | Maki Horikita | Ataru: The First Love & the Last Kill | Japan | |
| 2014 | Nathan | Asa Butterfield | X+Y | UK | |
| 2014 | Riley Morris | Riley Polanski | Alien Abduction | USA | |
| 2015 | Adam | Ty Simpkins | Meadowland | USA | |
| 2015 | Etienne | Lucas Reiber | Fack ju Göhte 2 | Germany | |
| 2015 | Glory Adams | Taylor Richardson | Jack of the Red Hearts | USA | |
| 2015 | Jane | Louisa Krause | Jane Wants a Boyfriend | USA | |
| 2016 | Christian Wolff | Ben Affleck | The Accountant | USA | |
| 2016 | Michael Taylor | David Mazouz | The Darkness | USA | |
| 2016 | Park Young-hoon | Lee David | Split | South Korea | |
| 2017 | Mária | Alexandra Borbély | On Body and Soul | Hungary | |
| 2017 | Billy Cranston | RJ Cyler | Power Rangers | USA | |
| 2017 | Lilly Blackburn | Lilly Jandreau | The Rider | USA | |
| 2018 | Wendy Welcott | Dakota Fanning | Please Stand By | USA | |
| 2018 | Rory McKenna | Jacob Tremblay | The Predator | USA | |
| 2019 | Nitya | Sai Pallavi | Athiran | India | |
| 2019 | Chris | Simon Hodges | Mind My Mind | Netherlands/Belgium | |
| 2019 | Jack Dory | Kiljan Tyr Moroney | Calm with Horses | Ireland | |
| 2020 | Renee | Madison Bandy (Note: Bandy is autistic herself.) | Loop | USA | |
| 2020 | Myna | Dhanika Hegde | Varnapatala | India | |
| 2020 | Oliver | Azhy Robertson | Come Play | USA | |
| 2020 | Bart Bromley | Tye Sheridan | The Night Clerk | USA | |
| 2021 | Music Gamble | Maddie Ziegler (Note: Director and co-writer Sia was diagnosed with autism herself following its release. Autistic actress Tig Notaro also appears in the film.) | Music | USA | |
| 2021 | Christina | Jordanne Jones | Mildly Different | Ireland | |
| 2022 | Tereza | Martha Issová | Buko | Czech Republic | |
| 2022 | Lola | Vanessa Burghardt (Note: Burghardt is autistic herself.) | Cha Cha Real Smooth | USA | |
| 2022 | Tyson | Major Dodson (Note: Dodson is autistic himself.) | Tyson's Run | USA | |
| 2023 | Ezra | William A. Fitzgerald (Note: Fitzgerald is autistic himself.) | Ezra | USA | |
| 2023 | Kingston Chung | Yeung Wai-lun | Over My Dead Body | Hong Kong | |
| 2024 | Kali | John Tyrron Ramos | Love Child | Philippines | |
| 2024 | Ludovica De Angelis | Rita Abela | Flaminia | Italy | |
| 2025 | Michael Locke | Matthew Tuck | Cleaner | UK | |
| 2025 | Don | Aidan Delbis (Note: Delbis is autistic himself.) | Bugonia | Ireland/South Korea/USA | |

== Literature ==
| Year | Character(s) | Book | Author(s) | Country | Notes | Ref. |
|---|---|---|---|---|---|---|
| 1964 | Manfred Steiner | Martian Time-Slip | Philip K. Dick | USA | | |
| 1996 | Seth Garin | The Regulators | Stephen King (under the pen name Richard Bachman) | USA | | |
| 1996 | Simon Lynch | Simple Simon | Ryne Douglas Pearson | USA | Adapted into the film Mercury Rising (1998). | |
| 2000 | Marty Zellerbach | The Hades Factor | Robert Ludlum and Gayle Lynds | USA | | |
| 2000 | Patrick | Truth or Dare | Celia Rees | England | | |
| 2002 | Darryl McAllister | A Wizard Alone | Diane Duane | USA | | |
| 2002 | Shepherd O'Conner | By the Light of the Moon | Dean Koontz | USA | | |
| 2003 | Christopher John Francis Boone | The Curious Incident of the Dog in the Night-Time | Mark Haddon | England | Adapted into a stage play of the same name. | |
| 2003 | Lou Arrendale and his co-workers | Speed of Dark | Elizabeth Moon | USA | | |
| 2004 | Ben | Niets was alles wat hij zei (Nothing Was All He Said) | Nic Balthazar | Belgium | Adapted into the film Ben X (2007). | |
| 2004 | Natalie Flanagan | Al Capone Does My Shirts | Gennifer Choldenko | USA | Also appears in the subsequent novels in the series. | |
| 2005 | Victor Hoppe | The Angel Maker | Stefan Brijs | Belgium | | |
| 2005 | Morgan Wiberg | The Stone Cutter | Camilla Läckberg | Sweden | | |
| 2006 | David | Rules | Cynthia Lord | USA | | |
| 2006 | Alan Wheddon | Dear John | Nicholas Sparks | USA | Adapted into the 2010 film of the same name. | |
| 2006 | Richard Tyree | Dear John | Nicholas Sparks | USA | Adapted into the 2010 film of the same name. | |
| 2007 | Blackwolf | Soon I Will Be Invincible | Austin Grossman | USA | | |
| 2007 | Adam | Eye Contact | Cammie McGovern | USA | | |
| 2007 | Amelia | Eye Contact | Cammie McGovern | USA | | |
| 2008 | Jessica Fontaine | The Language of Others | Clare Morrall | England | | |
| 2008 | Gillian Grayson | Mass Effect: Ascension | Drew Karpyshyn | Canada | | |
| 2008 | Mickey Tussler | The Legend of Mickey Tussler | Frank Nappi | USA | Adapted into the television film A Mile in His Shoes (2011). | |
| 2008 | Peter Michael "Little Pete" Ellison | Gone | Michael Grant | USA | Character appears in all six "Season One" books, published between 2008 and 2013. | |
| 2009 | Marcelo Sandoval | Marcelo in the Real World | Francisco X. Stork | USA | | |
| 2009 | Geert | De Autist en de Postduif | Rodaan Al Galidi | Netherlands | | |
| 2009 | Aliénor Malèze | The Winter Journey | Amélie Nothomb | Belgium | | |
| 2009 | Ryan Scott | Into the Silence | Sarah Pinborough | England | Based on the TV series Torchwood. | |
| 2009 | Malcolm Decter | WWW Trilogy | Robert J. Sawyer | Canada | Character appears in all three books, published between 2009 and 2011. | |
| 2010 | Jacob Hunt | House Rules | Jodi Picoult | USA | | |
| 2010 | Max Parkman | Saving Max | Antoinette van Heugten | USA | | |
| 2010 | Caitlin Smith | Mockingbird | Kathryn Erskine | USA | | |
| 2010 | Dwight Tharp | The Strange Case of Origami Yoda | Tom Angleberger (Note: Angleberger is autistic himself.) | USA | | |
| 2010 | Harvey Cunningham | The Strange Case of Origami Yoda | Tom Angleberger | USA | | |
| 2010 | Renarin Kholin | The Stormlight Archive | Brandon Sanderson | USA | Character appears in all books, published 2010 to present. | |
| 2011 | Trueman Bradley | Trueman Bradley - Aspie Detective | Alexei Maxim Russell | Canada | | |
| 2011 | James Donovan Halliday | Ready Player One | Ernest Cline | USA | | |
| 2011 | Steris Harms | Mistborn: The Allow of Law | Brandon Sanderson | USA | | |
| 2012 | Anthony Donatelli | Love Anthony | Lisa Genova | USA | | |
| 2012 | Ivan Tarasov | Triggers | Robert J. Sawyer | Canada | | |
| 2012 | Sammy | Amber House | Kelly Moore, Tucker Reed and Larkin Reed | USA | | |
| 2012 | Colin Fischer | Colin Fischer | Ashley Edward Miller and Zack Stentz (Note: Stentz is autistic himself.) | USA | | |
| 2013 | Don Tillman | The Rosie Project | Graeme Simsion | Australia | | |
| 2013 | Oscar | The Real Boy | Anne Ursu | USA | | |
| 2013 | Harriet Manners | Geek Girl | Holly Smale (Note: Smale is autistic herself.) | England | | |
| 2014 | Rose Howard | Rain Reign | Ann M. Martin | USA | | |
| 2014 | Kurt Bacon | Isla and the Happily Ever After | Stephanie Perkins | USA | | |
| 2014 | Lin YuLong "Jade Dragon" | Michael Vey: Hunt for Jade Dragon | Richard Paul Evans | USA | | |
| 2014 | Astra Ordott | The Gaia Chronicles | Naomi Foyle (Note: Foyle is autistic herself.) | England/Canada | | |
| 2015 | Paul Stephens | Paul and His Beast | Sarah Stup | USA | | |
| 2015 | Tim | Paul and His Beast | Sarah Stup | USA | | |
| 2016 | Tiberius "Ty" Blackthorn | The Dark Artifices | Cassandra Clare | USA | | |
| 2017 | Aster Grey | An Unkindness of Ghosts | Rivers Solomon (Note: Solomon is autistic themself.) | USA | | |
| 2017 | Jack Kagen | There's More Than One Way Home | Donna Levin | USA | Also appears in the sequel, He Could Be Another Bill Gates. | |
| 2018 | Luke Jennings | The Fox | Frederick Forsyth | England | | |
| 2018 | Stella Lane | The Kiss Quotient | Helen Hoang (Note: Hoang was diagnosed with autism herself following her daughter's diagnosis; this influenced the development of The Kiss Quotient and her subsequent books.) | USA | | |
| 2019 | Edison "Eddie" Matthews | The Things We Cannot Say | Kelly Rimmer | Australia | | |
| 2019 | Shane Hollander | Heated Rivalry | Rachel Reid | Canada | Also appears in the subsequent novels in the series; adapted into the 2025 TV series of the same name. | |
| 2019 | Avery Lou | The Boy Who Steals Houses | C.G. Drews (Note: Drews is autistic herself.) | Australia | | |
| 2019 | Khai Diep | The Bride Test | Helen Hoang | USA | | |
| 2020 | Elle | The Leap Cycle | Patience Agbabi | USA | | |
| 2020 | Big Ben | The Leap Cycle | Patience Agbabi | USA | | |
| 2020 | Keedie Darrow | A Kind of Spark | Elle McNicoll (Note: McNicoll is autistic herself.) | Scotland | Adapted into the 2023 TV series of the same name. | |
| 2020 | Addie Darrow | A Kind of Spark | Elle McNicoll | Scotland | Adapted into the 2023 TV series of the same name. | |
| 2020 | Elinor Fraser | A Kind of Spark | Elle McNicoll | Scotland | Adapted into the 2023 TV series of the same name. | |
| 2020 | Unnamed protagonist | A Room Called Earth | Madeleine Ryan (Note: Ryan is autistic herself.) | Australia | | |
| 2020 | Hudson Tillman | The Rosie Result | Graeme Simsion | Australia | | |
| 2021 | Jesse Broadview | Me and Sam-Sam Handle the Apocalypse | Susan Vaught (Note: Vaught is autistic herself.) | USA | | |
| 2021 | Ester Harding | Daughter Of The Deep | Rick Riordan | USA | | |
| 2021 | Anna Sun | The Heart Principle | Helen Hoang | USA | | |
| 2021 | Eve Brown | Act Your Age, Eve Brown | Talia Hibbert (Note: Hibbert is autistic herself.) | England | | |
| 2021 | Jacob Wayne | Act Your Age, Eve Brown | Talia Hibbert | England | | |
| 2022 | Nick | Hell Followed with Us | Andrew Joseph White (Note: White is autistic himself.) | USA | | |
| 2023 | Cassandra Dankworth | The Cassandra Complex | Holly Smale | England | | |
| 2023 | Phoebe | Finding Phoebe | Gavin Extence | England | | |
| 2023 | Alice | The Secret Service of Tea and Treason | India Holton (Note: Holton is autistic herself.) | New Zealand | | |
| 2023 | Daniel Bixby | The Secret Service of Tea and Treason | India Holton | New Zealand | | |
| 2023 | Ariana Ruiz | The Luis Ortega Survival Club | Sonora Reyes (Note: Reyes is autistic themself.) | USA | | |
| 2023 | Rose | Camp Damascus | Chuck Tingle (Note: Tingle is autistic himself.) | USA | | |
| 2023 | Sunday | All the Little Bird-Hearts | Viktoria Lloyd-Barlow (Note: Lloyd-Barlow is autistic herself.) | UK | | |
| 2025 | Julianna "Jules" Cangelosi | Pasta Girls | Taylor Tracy | USA | | |
| 2026 | Walter | Upward Bound | Woody Brown (Note: Brown is autistic himself.) | USA | | |
| 2026 | Emma | Upward Bound | Woody Brown | USA | | |

== Television ==
| Year | Character | Actor(s) | Episode(s) | Series | Country | Ref. |
|---|---|---|---|---|---|---|
| 1963 | Petey Babcock | Eddy Rossen | And James Was a Very Small Snail | Breaking Point | USA | |
| 1983 | Tommy Westphall | Chad Allen | | St. Elsewhere | USA | |
| 1999 | Chris Griffin | Seth Green | | Family Guy | USA | |
| 2000 | Lily Montgomery | Leven Rambin | | All My Children | USA | |
| 2000 | Mayuko Amemiya | Rie Tomosaka | | Kimi ga Oshietekureta-koto | Japan | |
| 2000 | Akira Takano | Fumiya Fujii | | Tenshi ga Kieta Machi | Japan | |
| 2001 | Martin Miller | Matthew Buckley | | Grange Hill | UK | |
| 2001 | Billy | Richard Steven Horvitz | | Grim and Evil/The Grim Adventures of Billy & Mandy (Note: Maxwell Atoms, creator of both series, is autistic himself.) | USA | |
| 2001 | Mandy | Grey DeLisle | | Grim and Evil/The Grim Adventures of Billy & Mandy | USA | |
| 2001 | Grim | Greg Eagles | | Grim and Evil/The Grim Adventures of Billy & Mandy | USA | |
| 2002 | Annie Wheaton | Kimberly J. Brown | | Rose Red | USA | |
| 2002 | Mikey Dunn | Trent Atkinson | Appeared as a recurring guest until 2003 | Home and Away | Australia | |
| 2003 | Wally Stevens | Mark Linn-Baker | "Probability" | Law & Order: Criminal Intent | USA | |
| 2004 | Bob Melnikov | Dmitry Chepovetsky | | ReGenesis | Canada | |
| 2004 | Hikaru Azuma | Ryusei Saito | | With the Light | Japan | |
| 2005 | Spencer Reid | Matthew Gray Gubler | | Criminal Minds | USA | |
| 2005 | Temperance Brennan | Emily Deschanel | | Bones | USA | |
| 2006 | Adam | Braeden Lemasters | "Lines in the Sand" | House M.D. | USA | |
| 2006 | Kevin Blake | Meschach Peters and Trevor Jackson | | Eureka | USA | |
| 2007 | Manny Rivera/El Tigre | Alanna Ubach (Note: Series co-creator Jorge R. Gutierrez is autistic himself.) | | El Tigre: The Adventures of Manny Rivera | USA | |
| 2007 | Brandon Powell | Jake Cherry | "Fear Itself" | The 4400 | USA | |
| 2007 | Karla Bentham | Jessica Baglow | season 3-5 | Waterloo Road | UK | |
| 2008 | Connor DeLaurier | A.J. Saudin | | Degrassi: The Next Generation | Canada | |
| 2008 | Virginia Dixon | Mary McDonnell | "These Ties That Bind" "All By Myself" "Beat Your Heart Out" | Grey's Anatomy | USA | |
| 2008 | Parker | Beth Riesgraf | | Leverage | USA | |
| 2009 | Robert Daly | Sam Peter Corry | | Fair City | Ireland | |
| 2009 | Gabrielle Jacobs | Virginie Le Brun | | Shortland Street | New Zealand | |
| 2009 | Brendan Austin | Kain O'Keeffe | Appeared as a recurring guest until 2010 | Home and Away | Australia | |
| 2009 | Jonah Jeremiah "JJ" Jones | Ollie Barbieri | | Skins | UK | |
| 2009 | Abed Nadir | Danny Pudi (Note: Series creator Dan Harmon is self-diagnosed autistic.) | | Community | USA | |
| 2010 | Max Braverman | Max Burkholder | | Parenthood | USA | |
| 2010 | Fred Jones | Frank Welker | | Scooby-Doo! Mystery Incorporated | USA | |
| 2010 | Carl Gould | Dwayne Hill | | Arthur | USA/Canada | |
| 2010 | Gus Carmichael | Noah Marullo | | Tracy Beaker Returns/The Dumping Ground | UK | |
| 2010 | Micaela Gómez | Mónica Spear | | La mujer perfecta (The Perfect Woman) | Venezuela | |
| 2011 | Gary Bell | Ryan Cartwright | | Alphas | USA | |
| 2011 | The parallel universe version of Astrid Farnsworth | Jasika Nicole | | Fringe | USA | |
| 2011 | Saga Norén | Sofia Helin | | The Bridge | Sweden/Denmark | |
| 2012 | Jacob "Jake" Bohm | David Mazouz | | Touch | USA | |
| 2012 | Ataru | Masahiro Nakai | | Ataru | Japan | |
| 2012 | Shahir Hamza | Husein Madhavji | | Saving Hope | Canada | |
| 2012 | Birgit Goethals | Ruth Becquart | | Clan | Belgium | |
| 2013 | Elise Wassermann | Clémence Poésy | | The Tunnel | UK/France | |
| 2013 | Sonya Cross | Diane Kruger | | The Bridge | USA | |
| 2013 | Noah Hoynes | Oscar Kennedy | | The Politician's Husband | UK | |
| 2013 | Park Shi-on | Joo Won | | Good Doctor | South Korea | |
| 2013 | Ah Kang | Steven Hao | episodes 1-4 and 14 | Amour et Pâtisserie | Taiwan | |
| 2013 | Yao Zitao | Alston Yeo Jun Yi | | The Dream Makers | Singapore | |
| 2014 | Sean Stone | Reece Shearsmith | | Chasing Shadows | UK | |
| 2015 | Isadora Smackle | Cecilia Balagot | | Girl Meets World | USA | |
| 2015 | Stina Vik | Esmeralda Struwe | | Modus | Sweden | |
| 2015 | Shinya Kiryu | Satoshi Hirabayashi | "心を閉ざした少年に起きた奇跡!? ボクがママを守る!" | Dr. Rintarō | Japan | |
| 2016 | Fiona 'Mittens' Helbron | Betty Gilpin | "Murder Ex Machina" "A View with a Room" "Ready or Not" | Elementary | USA | |
| 2016 | Jason Haynes | Jules Robertson (Note: Robertson is autistic himself.) | Series 18-23 | Holby City | UK | |
| 2016 | Joe Hughes | Max Vento | | The A Word | UK | |
| 2017 | Julia | Stacey Gordon | | Sesame Street | USA | |
| 2017 | Shaun Murphy | Freddie Highmore | | The Good Doctor | USA | |
| 2017 | Sam Gardner | Keir Gilchrist | | Atypical | USA | |
| 2017 | Dean Simms | Harold Perrineau | | Claws | USA | |
| 2017 | Benedita "Benê" Teixeira Ramos | Daphne Bozaski | Malhação: Viva a Diferença | Malhação/As Five | Brazil | |
| 2017 | Pablo | Jake Williamson (voice), William and Oliver Burns (live-action) (Note: The series features a mostly autistic voice cast and writing team.) | | Pablo | UK/Ireland | |
| 2018 | James Coulter | Daniel Kerr | 20 April—12 October 2018 | Doctors | UK | |
| 2018 | Entrapta | Christine Woods (Note: Storyboard artist Sam Syzmanski is autistic himself and played a pivotal role in Entrapta's development. Merit Leighton, who voiced the character of Frosta, is also autistic herself.) | | She-Ra and the Princesses of Power | USA | |
| 2018 | Donatello | Josh Brener | | Rise of the Teenage Mutant Ninja Turtles | USA | |
| 2018 | Townes Linderman | Daniel Maslany | | Impulse | USA | |
| 2018 | Greta Allinson | Zoe Croft (Note: Croft is autistic herself.) | | Holby City | UK | |
| 2018 | Phoenix Hathaway | Tylan Grant (Note: Grant is autistic himself.) | | Hollyoaks | UK | |
| 2018 | Zohar | Naomi Levov | | On the Spectrum | Israel | |
| 2018 | Ron | Niv Majar | | On the Spectrum | Israel | |
| 2018 | Amit | Ben Yosipovich | | On the Spectrum | Israel | |
| 2018 | Minato Shindo | Kento Yamazaki | | Good Doctor | Japan | |
| 2019 | Lana Moore | Vered Blonstein (Note: Blonstein is autistic herself) | "Xin" | The Good Doctor | USA | |
| 2019 | Javier "Javi" Maldonado | Alex Plank (Note: Plank is autistic himself) | "Xin" | The Good Doctor | USA | |
| 2019 | Dawkins | Rhys Isaac-Jones | | 101 Dalmatian Street | UK/Canada | |
| 2019 | Astrid Nielsen | Sara Mortensen (Note: One of the show's three writers is autistic. Autistic actor Hugo Horiot plays a neurotypical character in the episode "La Mort et Compagnie".) | | Astrid et Raphaëlle | France/Belgium | |
| 2019 | Carl Destoop | Zouzou Ben Chikha | | The Twelve | Belgium | |
| 2019 | Amistad Ervin | Kurtis Mansfield | Third season onwards | Young Justice | USA | |
| 2019 | Snork | Chance Perdomo | | Moominvalley | Finland/UK | |
| 2019 | Matthew | Paras Patel | | The Chosen | USA | |
| 2020 | Matilda Moss | Kayla Cromer (Note: Cromer is autistic herself.) | | Everything's Gonna Be Okay | USA | |
| 2020 | Jeremy | Carsen Warner (Note: Warner is autistic himself.) | | Everything's Gonna Be Okay | USA | |
| 2020 | Nicholas | Josh Thomas (Note: Thomas, who also created the series, is autistic himself.) | | Everything's Gonna Be Okay | USA | |
| 2020 | Drea | Lillian Carrier | | Everything's Gonna Be Okay | USA | |
| 2020 | AJ Gadgets | Jadiel Dowlin | | Hero Elementary | USA/Canada | |
| 2020 | Sean | George Yionoulis (Note: Yionoulis is autistic himself.) | "Nancy's New Friend" | Fancy Nancy | USA | |
| 2020 | Misha | Eldar Kalimulin | | To the Lake | Russia | |
| 2020 | Marcy Wu | Haley Tju | | Amphibia | USA | |
| 2020 | Fang Yi-Jen | Joseph Chang | | The Victims' Game | Taiwan | |
| 2021 | Max | Israel Thomas-Bruce (Note: Thomas-Bruce is autistic himself.) | "Daniel's New Friend Max" | Daniel Tiger's Neighborhood | USA/Canada | |
| 2021 | Han Geu-Ru | Tang Jun-sang | | Move to Heaven | South Korea | |
| 2021 | Sara Eriksson | Frida Argento (Note: Argento is autistic herself.) | | Young Royals | Sweden | |
| 2021 | Jasper Tempest | Ben Miller | | Professor T. | UK | |
| 2021 | Curtis | Jonathan Simao | | Turner & Hooch | USA | |
| 2021 | Anthony | Lucas Yao | | Turner & Hooch | USA | |
| 2022 | Jack Hoffman | Rick Glassman (Note: Glassman is autistic himself.) | | As We See It | USA | |
| 2022 | Harrison Dietrich | Albert Rutecki (Note: Rutecki is autistic himself.) | | As We See It | USA | |
| 2022 | Violet Wu | Sue Ann Pien (Note: Pien is autistic herself.) | | As We See It | USA | |
| 2022 | Norma Khan | Kody Kavitha (Note: Series creator Hamish Steele is autistic himself.) | | Dead End: Paranormal Park | UK/USA | |
| 2022 | Woo Young-woo | Park Eun-bin | | Extraordinary Attorney Woo | South Korea | |
| 2022 | Bruno | Chuck Smith (United States/Canada) and Elliot Garcia (United Kingdom) (Note: Both Smith and Garcia are autistic themselves.) | | Thomas & Friends: All Engines Go | USA/Canada | |
| 2022 | Twyla Boogeyman | Kayla Cromer (Note: Cromer is autistic herself.) | | Monster High | USA | |
| 2022 | Quinni Gallagher-Jones | Chloé Hayden (Note: Hayden is autistic herself.) | | Heartbreak High | Australia | |
| 2023 | BeBe Proud | Aiden Dodson (Note: Dodson is autistic himself.) | | The Proud Family: Louder and Prouder | USA | |
| 2023 | Arthur | Victor Ferreira (Note: Ferreira is autistic himself.) | Season 1 | Use Sua Voz | Brazil | |
| 2023 | Edward | Rick Glassman | | Not Dead Yet | USA | |
| 2023 | June Chen | Sue Ann Pien | | The Ghost and Molly McGee | USA | |
| 2023 | Lena Głowacka | Martyna Byczkowska | | Absolute Beginners | Poland | |
| 2023 | Eddie | Grayson Davies (Note: Davies is autistic himself, and autistic writers, animators and cast members are also involved in production.) | | Ready Eddie Go! | United Kingdom | |
| 2023 | Addie Darrow | Lola Blue (Note: Blue is autistic herself.) | Season 1-2 | A Kind of Spark | UK/Ireland/USA/Canada | |
| 2023 | Keedie Darrow | Georgia De Gidlow (Note: Gidlow is autistic herself.) | Season 1-2 | A Kind of Spark | UK/Ireland/USA/Canada | |
| 2023 | Elinor Fraser | Ella Maisy Purvis (Note: Purvis is autistic herself.) | Season 1 | A Kind of Spark | UK/Ireland/USA/Canada | |
| 2024 | Bonnie Bridges | Ella Maisy Purvis | Season 2 | A Kind of Spark | UK/Ireland/USA/Canada | |
| 2024 | Nina | Ashley Storrie (Note: Storrie is autistic herself.) | | Dinosaur | UK | |
| 2024 | Alice Yaemori | Mugi Kadowaki | | Alice in Wonderful Kitchen | Japan | |
| 2024 | Charlotte "Charlie" Lukaitis | Kayla Cromer (Note: Cromer is autistic herself) | Season 7 | The Good Doctor | USA | |
| 2024 | Kojo Asare | Dayo Koleosho (Note: Koleosho is autistic himself.) | | EastEnders | UK | |
| 2024 | Carl | Kai Barham (Note: Barham is autistic himself, and the show employs multiple autistic writers.) | | Carl the Collector | USA/Canada | |
| 2024 | Lotta | Maddy McIlwain (Note: McIlwain is autistic herself.) | | Carl the Collector | USA/Canada | |
| 2024 | Paolo | Odin Frost (Note: Frost is a non-speaking autistic.) | A New Friend | Carl the Collector | USA/Canada | |
| 2024 | Komori Michito | Bando Ryota | | Light of My Lion | Japan | |
| 2024 | Fok Bo-lok | Mason Fung (Note: Fung is autistic himself.) | Forensic Heroes VI: Redemption | Forensic Heroes | Hong Kong | |
| 2024 | Austin Hogan | Michael Theo (Note: Theo is autistic himself.) | | Austin | Australia/UK | |
| 2025 | Sky | Nalinthip Sakulongampai | | The Yarns | Thailand | |
| 2025 | Patience Evans | Ella Maisy Purvis (Note: Purvis is autistic herself.) | | Patience | UK | |
| 2025 | Lewis Barton | Bradley Riches (Note: Riches is autistic himself.) | | Emmerdale | UK | |
| 2025 | Shane Hollander | Hudson Williams | | Heated Rivalry | Canada | |
| 2026 | Juhi Suri | Eisha Singh | | Juhi Mui | India | |
| 2026 | Minami Minamida | Mana Ashida | | Extraordinary Attorney Minami | Japan | |

== Theater ==
| Year | Character | Play | Playwright | Country | Ref. |
|---|---|---|---|---|---|
| 1955 | Dame Edna Everage | Various stage and television productions | Barry Humphries | Australia | |
| 1997 | "Spoonface" Steinberg | Spoonface Steinberg | Lee Hall | England | |
| 2012 | Christopher Boone | The Curious Incident of the Dog in the Night-Time | Simon Stephens | England | |
| 2015 | Adhvik | Chains: Love Stories of Shadows | AK Srikanth | India | |
| 2017 | Luke | Mosquitoes | Lucy Kirkwood | England | |
| 2019 | Laurence | All in a Row | Alex Oates | England | |
| 2023 | Various | How to Dance in Ohio | Rebecca Greer Melocik (book & lyrics), Jacob Yandura (music) | USA | |

== Video games ==
| Year | Character | Actor(s) | Video game | Country | Notes | Ref. |
|---|---|---|---|---|---|---|
| 2001 | Charlie Kane's unnamed son | Ian Axness | Twisted Metal: Black | USA | | |
| 2005 | Jade (The Indigo Child) | n/a; silent | Fahrenheit | France | | |
| 2005 | Murky | Tatiana Vesyolkina | Pathologic | Russia | Also appears in Pathologic 2 | |
| 2005 | Aroe Yasaka | Junko Nakata (ja) (Note: She went under the alias of Junko Kusayanagi due to the game's adult content.) | Swan Song (2005) (ja) | Japan | | |
| 2007 | Dr. Brigid Tenenbaum | Anne Bobby | BioShock | USA/Australia | Also appears in BioShock 2, BioShock 2: Minerva's Den, and is referenced in BioShock Infinite: Burial at Sea. | |
| 2007 | Simone Cole | Michelle Specht | Clive Barker's Jericho | Spain/USA | | |
| 2010 | David Archer | Jesse Gervais | Mass Effect 2: Overlord | Canada | Also appears in Mass Effect 3 | |
| 2011 | River Wyles | n/a; game does not feature voice acting | To the Moon | Canada | | |
| 2011 | Isabelle | n/a; game does not feature voice acting | To the Moon | Canada | | |
| 2012 | Ariadne Johnson | n/a | Silent Hill: Downpour | Czech Republic | | |
| 2012 | Amy | Kriss Logan (grunts) | Amy | France | | |
| 2012 | Patricia Tannis | Colleen Clinkenbeard | Borderlands 2 | USA | | |
| 2014 | Cole | James Norton | Dragon Age: Inquisition | Canada | | |
| 2014 | Drake of Blades | Arianna Ratner | The Elder Scrolls Online | USA | | |
| 2015 | Marius "Jäger" Streicher | Michael Sinterniklaas | Tom Clancy's Rainbow Six Siege | Canada | | |
| 2016 | Symmetra | Anjali Bhimani | Overwatch | USA | Also appears in Overwatch (2023 video game). | |
| 2016 | Josh Sauchak | Jonathan Dubsky | Watch Dogs 2 | Canada | | |
| 2017 | Rell | Stefan Martello | Warframe | Canada | | |
| 2017 | Gin Ibushi | n/a; game does not feature voice acting | Your Turn To Die | Japan | | |
| 2018 | Aesop Carl | Liu Yuxuan (Chinese); Koki Uchiyama (Japanese) | Identity V | China | | |
| 2019 | Wattson | Justine Huxley | Apex Legends | USA | | |
| 2023 | Birdie Malik | Madison Walsh | Tom Clancy's The Division 2 | Sweden | | |
| 2023 | Claire Ortiz | Madison Walsh | Tom Clancy's The Division 2 | Sweden | | |
| 2024 | Aurora | Emeri Chase | League of Legends | USA | | |
| 2025 | Sakuko Igarashi | Courtney Lin and Eri Goda | Silent Hill f | Hong Kong | | |

== Other ==
| Year | Character | Actor(s) | Franchise | Medium | Country | Ref. |
|---|---|---|---|---|---|---|
| 2011 | Michael Falk | John Cariani | The Onion | Satirical news, online videos | USA | |
| 2019 | Ayda Aguefort | Brennan Lee Mulligan | Dimension 20 | Actual play | USA | |
| 2022 | Twyla Boogeyman | Kayla Cromer (TV series), Tangina Stone (singing voice) | Monster High | Toys/Animated Series | USA | |
| 2022 | Jiang Dong-ping | Peng Haoqin (voice) | Unlocking Music | Web series | Taiwan | |
| 2023 | Roberta Craven | Louise Jameson | Torchwood | Audio drama | UK | |
| 2023 | Asteria | n/a (Note: Designer Makenzie De Armas is autistic herself.) | Dungeons & Dragons | Tabletop role-playing game | USA | |
| 2023 | Shuai Jiamo | Zhang Ruoyun | Under The Microscope | Web series | China | |

== See also ==
- Autism in popular culture
- Autism in television
- List of fictional characters with disabilities
- List of films about autism
