= Borys Fynkelshteyn =

Ukrainian writer (born 1946)

- Борис Финкельштейн
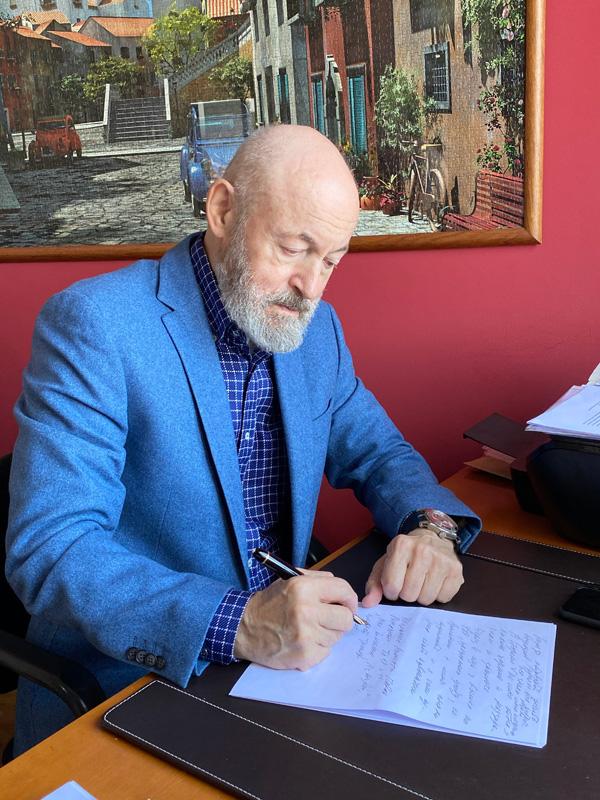
- Born: Borys Hryhoriyovych Fynkelshteyn; 20 August 1946; Odesa, Ukrainian SSR, USSR
- Occupations: Writer; economist; banker
- Writing career
- Language: Ukrainian
- Period: Modern
- Genres: Novel; novella; short story; sketch
- Notable work: O Venice! (2023)
- Notable awards: "Blahovist" by the National Writers' Union of Ukraine; Prize named after Sholem Aleichem

Borys Fynkelshteyn — (born 20 August 1946, Odesa) is a Ukrainian writer, economist, and banker. A member of the National Writers' Union of Ukraine, a laureate of several literary awards.

== Biography ==
Fynkelshteyn was born into a Jewish family of mathematicians. He is a direct descendant of Sephardic Jews who were expelled from Spain under the Alhambra Decree of Catholic monarchs Ferdinand and Isabella in 1492. His father, Hryhorii Markovych Fynkelshteyn, was a candidate of physical and mathematical sciences and an associate professor, while his mother, Ida Pinkhusivna Fynkelshteyn, worked as a mathematics teacher.

After the Second World War, the family returned to Odesa and later moved to Astrakhan, where his father became the head of the mathematics department at a pedagogical institute. In 1963, Fynkelshteyn graduated from secondary school, and in 1968, he completed his studies at the Odesa Electrotechnical Institute of Communications.

After graduating from the institute, Fynkelshteyn served in the army, attaining the rank of senior lieutenant. Following his demobilisation, he worked as a senior shift engineer at the Intercity Telephone Station in Simferopol. In 1971, he joined the "Sphegazproekt" institute, where he progressed from senior engineer to deputy director for scientific work and economics. In 1985, he defended his candidate dissertation on the topic "Improving Management for the Development of Offshore Oil and Gas Fields."

From 1989 to 1990, he was the chief engineer of the project for the development of the Shtokman oil and gas field. In 1992, he left the institute and began working in newly established companies in the financial market. In 1994, he founded and headed the Crimean Regional Office of the commercial bank “PrivatBank,” which became the largest banking institution in Crimea.

Borys Fynkelshteyn is married and has a daughter and two adult grandchildren. In 2014, he moved to Barcelona, where his ancestors lived. He is proficient in Ukrainian, Russian, English, and Spanish. He has numerous sporting interests, including skiing, and enjoys collecting antique books and historical cold weapons.

== Writing career ==
In 2012, Fynkelshteyn was elected Chairman of the Crimean branch of the National Writers' Union of Ukraine. In 2014, due to the liquidation of the banking system of Ukraine in Crimea, he focused on his writing career. He has over 300 published scientific works and 29 fiction books, with his works published in 15 languages across 17 countries (UK, Spain, Chile, etc)

On March, 2024 Fynkelshteyn presented his book "O Venice!" at the University of Chichester (UK). The book was edited by the British poet, essayist, playwright, and editor Dr. Naomi Foyle. "O Venice!" was also published in the "ART (Analyses/Rereadings/Theories) Journal" (2021).

“International Journal of Literary Humanities” published a few academic researches about Fynkelshteyn's writer's techniques and stylish peculiarities. The Latin American edition of Fynkelshteyn's book was featured as an example of the metamodern magic realism revelation in fiction.

== Awards ==
Borys Fynkelshteyn is a laureate of several literary awards ("Blahovist" by the National Writers’ Union of Ukraine), and the Prize Diploma Holder of the State Prize of Ukraine named after Sholem Aleichem by the Ministry of Culture of Ukraine.
