= Yuri Nakagawa =

- Born: Kanazawa, Ishikawa
- Occupation: Model
- Website: instagram.com/darayunya/

Yuri Nakagawa (中川友里) is a Japanese fashion model, public figure and popular fashion blogger. She is an official fashion blogger for JFW, which is an international fashion exhibition, regularly organized by prominent Japanese fashion newspaper, Senken Shimbun.

Yuri is also a model who has appeared on television networks, such as Fashion TV and has been featured in such prominent publications as Vogue, Timeout Magazine and Asahi Shimbun.

== Early life ==
During her childhood, in Kanazawa, Ishikawa Prefecture, Yuri studied Japanese tea ceremony, flower arrangement, and gymnastics and enjoyed expressing herself, through these traditional Japanese arts. She had planned to begin modeling work, after high school graduation, but her parents would not allow her to leave the prefecture, unless she attended college. Yuri moved to Tokyo, to study, and began her successful modeling career in the final year of her college degree.

== In popular culture ==
In 2015, Yuri Nakagawa was featured in the novel Trueman Bradley - The Next Great Detective, second novel in the Trueman Bradley series, by Alexei Maxim Russell. In the novel, the protagonist, who is a private detective, and a Japanophile, is obsessed with Yuri. He uses her Instagram posts as a source of inspiration, to help him uncover the secret of resonance, the lost art of instinctual inference, which he purports was one of the secret tactics of the famous detective, Sherlock Holmes.
