= On the spectrum =

On the spectrum may refer to

- "On the spectrum", an informal term referring to people with autism spectrum disorder
- On the Spectrum (TV series), a 2018 Israeli comedy-drama television series
