= ArchLord =

2005 video game

Archlord
- Developers: NHN Corporation; Codemasters Online Gaming
- Publishers: Webzen (former); Codemasters (former)
- Engine: RenderWare
- Platform: Windows
- Release: KOR: March 2005; NA: October 3, 2006; EU: October 6, 2006; AU: 7 August 2009
- Genre: Massively multiplayer online role-playing game
- Mode: Multiplayer

ArchLord was a fantasy massively multiplayer online role-playing game developed by NHN Corporation and Codemasters Online Gaming (COG). The game was released in March 2005 in South Korea and October 2006 in North America and Europe, receiving poor reviews from the gaming press. In August 2007, ArchLord became free-to-play to coincide with the release of the first episodic expansion pack, Season of Siege. The second expansion, Spirits Awakening, was released in August 2008. From August 2009, Webzen published ArchLord in additional countries where Codemasters did not have rights to distribute the game. From October 3 the same year, Webzen maintained ArchLord globally, offering the seventh expansion, called Heaven & Hell. The game has been shut down since January 1, 2014.

== Gameplay ==
ArchLord used a crafting system, which allowed players to upgrade items in a unique way, and allowed players to carve, skin and ransack any defeated monster. The materials obtained using carving, skinning, and ransacking skills were used in Alchemy and Cooking to create power-up items. Alchemy created metamorphosis potions, which allowed players to transform into monsters, whereas Cooking allowed a player to create food which gave statistic bonuses, e.g. defense buffs.

There was an advanced market system employed in this game for ease of trading between players.

One feature of ArchLord was the ability to compete to become the ArchLord, the ruler of the game world. Only one ArchLord could exist on each server. ArchLords reigned for four weeks before they were challenged by other players for the position. Each server's ArchLord had access to a castle, a unique dragon mount, control of the weather and other features.

== Plot ==
ArchLord is set on the continent of Chantra and features four playable races: Orcs, Humans, Moon Elves and the new DragonScion. Orcs begin their quests in the Golunndo, Humans begin in Anchorville, Moon Elves begin in Norine, and DragonScions in Cien. They all have access to three classes except for the DragonScion that from level 20 evolves to one of the three races.

The Humans first appeared in Chantra 1000 years after the Orcs had settled. Following the dramatic sinking of their land, key pioneers in Human society initially established a foothold in the Western part of the continent known as Chantra. History suggests they were able to do so due to their ability to handle fire. In the early stages, Humans lived in relative peace, but they soon began to realize that Orcs had landed on the Eastern part of the continent and before long tensions were raised as the Humans became protective of their territory. Humans have a relatively short lifespan, with 80 years considered to be long. Humans also have an inferior breeding capacity when compared to Orcs, with the average number of offspring being three.

The Orcs have occupied the land of Chantra for a 1000 years longer than the Humans. For this reason, the Orcs held themselves in higher regard than their Human counterparts and enslaved them for 500 years. Over time the Humans rebelled against their Orc masters and eventually won their freedom. 500 years later the continent was struck by a huge earthquake, which caused much of it to sink into the ocean. Humans and Orcs were forced to flee the western continent of Chantra. Under the leadership of Ugdrasil, the Orcs colonized a small part of the continent where they began the re-building process.

The Moon Elves are a race that were once considered Elves, but different. Once one of three of the great elf races that inhabited the Nordenland during the 2nd period, they were the first race to fall in the Great War. As a result of this devastating conflict most of the male population was annihilated. A few males were able to escape together with the women; they hid themselves in the shadows from those in the outside world. As time went on, the women took it upon themselves to replace the male roles in their society, and thus learned to master the fine arts of hunting and craftsmanship. The few remaining men were forbidden to enter combat, as they were too precious a commodity. Through a cruel twist of fate the remaining men only seemed capable of producing more women. This forced the Moon Elves to step from their shadowy world and start exploring for additional breeding options; this is how they came to be known by the Orcs and Humans. They were so ashamed of this action that they chose to hide themselves in the dark for centuries, only revealing themselves once their land was invaded by the Orcs and Humans.

The Dragon Scion was the last of the 4 races to arrive at the continent of Chantra. They were created from the skin and bone of the great dragon 'Mightthesis' 2000 years ago, after their creation they roamed the world for 1000 years, searching for a place to settle down, finally reaching the continent of Chantra.

== Service transition ==
Due to failure to reach an agreement with NHN, Codemasters was unable to renew their license for ArchLord, no longer able to provide the game to European and North American customers. As of September 2009, all credit purchases have been disabled, CM accounts transferred to the new provider and the game servers shut down on October 2. Day later, the game was turned over to Webzen, a Korean publisher.

== Critical reception ==
ArchLord received poor ratings; GameSpot criticized the repetitive and tedious gameplay, blurry graphics and lackluster audio, shallow quest and crafting system, and the hours of repetitive combat required to get to player versus player and high-level content. The reviewer's only positive comment was that ArchLord offered familiar role-playing gameplay of "kill, loot, buy stuff", overall awarding a "terrible" rating of 2.7 out of 10. Eurogamer awarded 4 out of 10, criticizing the lack of visual distinction between the power levels of monsters, with trial and error required to progress; a lack of other players, with those present not offering any legible dialogue; atrocious controls that caused the reviewer's character to get stuck on scenery; interesting-sounding features (castle sieges, for example) being restricted to higher levels; and a user interface that's "like using Windows 95 with a migraine".

== Other media ==
=== Manhwa ===
ArchLord
- Cover of Tokyopop edition of ArchLord #1 (2007), art by Park Jin-hwan.
- Genre: Action/adventure, fantasy; Based on the video game of the same name.
- Author: Park Jin-hwan
- Publisher: (South Korea) Daiwon C.I.
- English publisher: (United States) Tokyopop
- Original run: 2005–2008
- Volumes: 6

An ancillary manhwa created by Korean author Park Jin-hwan goes by the same name. The ArchLord manhwa was first released in South Korea on September 30, 2005. Tokyopop released an English version in 2007.

The manhwa follows the adventures of a human named Zian and his friend, a half-orc named Ugdrasil, who find themselves in the midst of a thousand year old conflict for control of five mysterious relics known as Archons.

=== The film ===
The game was officially used in the film Ben X and plays an important role in it, showing the main character's internal perception of the world.
