= Rick Glassman =

American comedian and actor (born 1984)

- Born: July 23, 1984 (age 42); Shaker Heights, Ohio, U.S.
- Education: Kent State University
- Occupations: Comedian; actor; writer; director
- Website: www.rickglassman.com

Rick Glassman (born July 23, 1984) is an American comedian and actor.

Glassman starred in the role of Burski on the NBC sitcom Undateable and wrote, directed and starred in the NBC-produced web series spin-off The Sixth Lead. He played the role of Harold Ramis in the film A Futile and Stupid Gesture, a biopic about the National Lampoon, and starred in the Amazon Prime Video comedy-drama series As We See It.

== Early life ==
Glassman was born in Shaker Heights, Ohio, a suburb of Cleveland, and grew up in the suburb of Orange. His grandfather, Sid Feller, was an arranger and close collaborator of Ray Charles. His father, Steve, was a restaurateur before becoming part owner of a carpet store in Mayfield Heights in the late 1990s. His father is Jewish and his mother is of Italian descent.

Glassman attended Orange High School, graduating in 2002. He was on the high school basketball team and played against the St. Vincent–St. Mary High School team, which was led at the time by LeBron James. He graduated from Kent State University in 2006 with a degree in marketing. He was also taking theatre classes while at school. After graduation, Glassman considered going to law school, but started performing stand-up comedy, first performing at the Cleveland Improv in 2007.

== Career ==
Glassman moved to Los Angeles in 2008 where he continued to perform stand-up comedy. His career gained traction after performing regularly at The Comedy Store. In 2013, he was invited to the New Faces showcase at Just for Laughs comedy festival. He appeared in an episode of Adam Devine's House Party in the show's second season.

Writer-producer Bill Lawrence invited Glassman and fellow comedian Brent Morin to audition for his sitcom Undateable after watching both comedians perform at the Hollywood Improv. Glassman and Morin each won roles in the show, which also stars Chris D'Elia, Ron Funches and David Fynn. Glassman played the part of Burski, a regular patron of the bar owned by Morin's character. While working on the show, Glassman pitched an idea to Lawrence that became the NBC-produced web series spin-off The Sixth Lead. Written, directed by, and starring Glassman, The Sixth Lead follows him during his day-to-day experiences as "the sixth lead" in Undateable's cast. Similar in style to the series Curb Your Enthusiasm, the series provides the viewer with a semi-fictionalized, behind-the-scenes look at Undateable's production and includes appearances by Lawrence and other cast members, as well as appearances by Zach Braff as himself. Glassman edited the series into a short film that won Best Short Film at the 2016 IFS Festival, held by the Independent Filmmakers Showcase in Los Angeles.

Glassman was a guest star on the 2015 series The Comedians, in the role of Clifford, and played the role of Harold Ramis in the 2018 biopic A Futile and Stupid Gesture.

In 2019 he launched his podcast, Take Your Shoes Off. The show mainly features interviews with comedians and others in the entertainment industry, sometimes featuring scenes briefly superimposed with digital animation or dramatized scenes between himself and his guests for comedic effect. His show also features advertisements directed by Glassman for Marshall Carpet One and Rug Gallery, the carpet store co-owned by his father.

In 2022, Glassman starred in the comedy drama series As We See It. Based on the Israeli series On the Spectrum, the show revolves around the lives of three roommates who are autistic. The roommates are played by actors on the autism spectrum, including Glassman, who was diagnosed with autism in adulthood. He also starred as Edward in the ABC sitcom Not Dead Yet, which premiered in February 2023. Glassman's character was autistic and the roommate of the character played by the show's lead Gina Rodriguez. The show ran for two seasons before being canceled in 2024.

Rick was in six McDonald's commercials, five of which were voice overs and one was a live action appearance.

== Personal life ==
Glassman was diagnosed with Autism in the late 2010s. He told Forbes that, since his diagnosis, "All of these seemingly unrelated obstacles became patterns that made sense... It's something that I was and am proud of."

== Filmography ==
=== Television ===
Year	Title	Role	Notes
2014	Adam Devine's House Party	Himself	Episode: "Poboy"
2014	Deadbeat	Sports Commentator	Episode: "The Hot God Contest"
2014–2016	Undateable	Adam Burski	Series regular; 36 episodes
2015	The Sixth Lead	Himself	Writer, director, series regular; 8 episodes
2015	Barely Famous	Himself	Episode: "Be More Likable"
2015	The Comedians	Clifford	2 episodes
2018	Nobodies	Dave	4 episodes
2018	Alone Together	Derek	Episode: "Mom"
2019	Mike Tyson Mysteries	Chris Glassman (voice)	Episode: “The Missing Package”
2022	As We See It	Jack Hoffman	Series regular; 8 episodes
2023–2024	Not Dead Yet	Edward	Series regular
2024	Nobody Wants This	Nico	Episode: "WAGS"
2026	Rooster	Professor Donaldson	2 episodes

=== Film ===
Year	Title	Role	Notes
2018	A Futile and Stupid Gesture	Harold Ramis	Released by Netflix
2023	Old Dads	Hunter Lewis	Released by Netflix
