= Alexandra Potter =

British author of romantic comedies (born 1970)

- Born: 1970 (age 55–56); Bradford, Yorkshire, England
- Education: Liverpool University
- Occupation: Author
- Writing career
- Years active: 2000–present
- Genre: Romantic comedy
- Notable works: Me and Mr. Darcy, Confessions of a Forty-Something F##k Up
- Notable awards: Best New Fiction at The Jane Austen Regency World Awards (2008)
- Website: www.alexandrapotter.com

Alexandra Potter (born in 1970) is a British author of romantic comedies.

== Biography ==
Born in Bradford, Yorkshire, England, Potter was educated at Liverpool University, where she received an honours degree in English Literature and Film Studies.

In 1993, at the age of 23, Potter moved to London to be the editor of a puzzle magazine. In her spare time, she wrote articles for British glossies such as ELLE, Company, More!, and Cosmopolitan. Five years later, she moved to Australia, where she worked for the Australian Vogue and Cleo Magazine.

In 1999, Potter began work on her first novel, What's New, Pussycat?. She signed a deal with literary agent Stephanie Cabot. Within days of handing in her finished manuscript, a bidding war broke out between several publishers. Potter ended up signing a two-book deal, and Pussycat was published in April 2000.

Potter has written 14 novels. Her books have been published in both the UK (including the Commonwealth) and the United States and have been translated and sold in 21 territories, including France, Germany, Netherlands, Spain, Greece, Turkey, Poland, Russia, Bulgaria, Czech Republic, Slovakia, Indonesia, Brazil, Macedonia, Romania, Slovenia, China, Croatia, Sweden and Serbia. Her novel Me and Mr. Darcy won Best New Fiction at The Jane Austen Regency World Awards in May 2008.

Potter has sold the film rights to several of her novels, including You're The One I Don't Want and Calling Romeo. Her novel Confessions of a Forty-Something F##k Up was adapted into the American television series Not Dead Yet.

== Works ==
=== Novels ===
1. What's New, Pussycat? (2000)
2. Going La La (2001)
3. Calling Romeo (2002)
4. Do You Come Here Often? (2004)
5. Be Careful What You Wish For (2006)
6. Me and Mr Darcy (2007)
7. Who's That Girl? (2009)
8. You're The One That I Don't Want (US: You're (Not) The One) (2010)
9. Don't You Forget About Me (2012)
10. The Love Detective (2014)
11. Love From Paris (2015)
12. Confessions of a Forty-Something F##k Up (2020)
13. One Good Thing (2022)
14. More Confessions of a Forty-Something F##K Up (2023)

=== Anthologies ===
1. No Strings Attached for Girl's Night Out (2001)
2. Me and Mr. Darcy Again for Jane Austen Made Me Do It (2011)
