= Reality pedagogy =

Reality pedagogy is a teaching and learning approach which is introduced by Christopher Emdin, professor in the Department of Mathematics, Science and Technology at Teachers College, Columbia University. This approach focuses on the understanding of students by the teacher. Here the teaching and learning is based on the reality of the student's experience. The teacher recognizes each student and from where he/she has come, it can be their culture or the community they belong to. Based on the information got by the teacher of the student, he/she uses that in the classroom as a point for instruction.

This approach also points out the need to create a space or environment where reality is brought into the classroom. The students should be able to relate to what the teacher teaches in class. The student's reality is the determinant of his/her behavior in the classroom. Therefore, the teacher needs to know the students, in order to have effective teaching and learning experience. Reality Pedagogy also brings to light critical thinking, where the role of the teacher is to create situations and engage students in critical thinking. This also allows them to express their views and voice out their opinion or ideas.

== The 7 C's ==
To have effective teaching and learning, there needs to be exchange of knowledge and skills between the teacher and students. This is done by tools called "7 C's", which allows the exchange of expertise.

1. Cogenerative dialogue- Here the students and teacher discuss the class environment, whether the classes are helpful or not, and if not, what can be done to improve it.
2. Co-teaching- Learning is more effective when one teaches. In this context, the teacher let's students make lesson plan and teach in the class. The teacher takes the place of the student, and the student takes place of the teacher. As a student knows the way in which they learn better, they know how to deliver or convey the information better and effectively. The student is allowed to teach from his/her own experiences.
3. Cosmopolitanism- This tool focuses on equal distribution of classroom responsibility, so that the class benefits and progresses.
4. Context- It is the use of certain behaviors of outside of the classroom, in the classroom. This makes learning effective as the students are as comfortable as they would be outside of the classroom environment.
5. Content- The teacher needs to focus on the content that is more relevant and which can be easy to relate to the student's real experiences. The teacher needs to also know the level of students capabilities and transact the content.
6. Competition - Students are given the space to engage in "coopetition" around academic content they are learning
7. Curation - Archives from the classroom are studied with students (video recordings of instruction and or previous class/course work) with goal of improving teaching practice based on critical study of recorded and collected data
