= Trueman Bradley =

Fictional character

Trueman Bradley – Aspie Detective
- First edition cover
- Author: Alexei Maxim Russell
- Language: English
- Genre: Mystery; Young Adult; Fantasy; Adventure
- Publisher: Jessica Kingsley Publishers
- Publication date: 15 October 2011
- Publication place: United Kingdom
- Media type: Print (Paperback)
- Pages: 304
- ISBN: 978-1-84905-262-7
- LC Class: PR9199.4.R857 T78 2012

Trueman Bradley is a fictional character in a series of detective novels written by Alexei Maxim Russell. Bradley is characterized as a genius detective with Asperger syndrome.

He first appeared in the book Trueman Bradley – Aspie Detective, a novel written by Alexei Maxim Russell and published in 2011 by Jessica Kingsley Publishers, an imprint of the major publishing house Hachette. It was the first detective novel to feature an openly autistic detective as a protagonist and was the first work of fiction to portray Asperger syndrome as a "different way of thinking". and therefore, not necessarily a disability. It was translated into German in 2013 by Von Loeper Literaturverlag Publishers, of Karlsruhe, Germany. It was followed by the second book in the series, Trueman Bradley – The Next Great Detective, in 2015.

== Plot ==
In Trueman Bradley – Aspie Detective:

Trueman leaves his hometown of Heartville, Illinois, and arrives in New York City, hoping to fulfil his dream of becoming a private detective, like his comic book heroes. He is soon told that a man with AS could not possibly succeed as a detective. Undeterred, Trueman uses his exceptional mathematical skills to invent a crime-fighting equation, and with the help of his new friends and some amazing inventions, sets out to test his skills against the criminal world of New York. He is determined to show the police, his friends, and himself, that a person with AS can become as good a detective as anyone else, maybe, even, one of the best.

In Trueman Bradley – The Next Great Detective:

Trueman Bradley visits London and sets up shop on Baker Street, in the hopes of becoming the next Sherlock Holmes. Using hints he has derived from the original Sherlock stories, Trueman uncovers the mysterious methods of "The Great Detective" and uses them to solve the mystery of how his grandfather acquired his fortune, as well as helping Scotland Yard to capture a notorious cat burglar. With the help of new wearable technology, called Sension (created by Catalin Voss), a small army of drones and the inspiration of Yuri Nakagawa (the Japanese model whose Instagram he is doggedly obsessed with) – along with the help of a few new friends, Trueman learns the value of deduction, imagination and instinct, in detective work, and proves that he has what it takes to become "The Next Great Detective.

== Reception ==
BFK Books described Trueman Bradley as "a genius detective with a difference." According to BFK Books: "Russell's writing style is pleasant and easy, reminiscent of the simplicity and innocence of Alexander McCall Smith."

CM Magazine wrote, "Asperger's Syndrome (AS) makes him a complex protagonist in a novel centred around a young man trying to make it as a private detective." CM Magazine goes on to describe it as "Somewhat reminiscent of the simplistic and formulaic episodes of Sobol's Encyclopedia Brown mystery series in combination with the bold private detective genre of Hammett's The Maltese Falcon, along with a nod to Haddon's central character in The Curious Incident of the Dog in the Night-Time, the book also has its own unique style".

Trueman Bradley has gained a cult following in advocacy and educational circles. Including being added to the book lesson plan for grade 6 students, by the Cromwell Center for Disabilities Awareness, of Portland, Maine, in 2015. Being officially adopted, in that same year, by Ireland's Department of Justice and Equality, as official teaching material for their "Someone Like Me" program, for primary schools – designed to encourage understanding of disabilities in their students and encourage and instil the "celebration of difference" in children.
