= Sarah Stup =

American writer and advocate (born 1983)

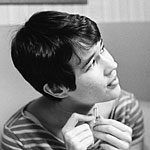
- Born: 1983 (age 42–43); Frederick, Maryland
- Occupations: Writer and advocate
- Writing career
- Years active: 2004 - present
- Genres: Children's literature, poetry, nonfiction essays
- Notable works: Do-Si-Do with Autism; Are Your Eyes Listening? Paul and His Beast
- Notable awards: 2004 Self Advocate of the Year (Arc of Maryland); 2022 Award for Outstanding Accomplishments in Disability Culture (Maryland Governor)

Sarah Stup (born 1983) is an American writer and advocate. She writes about community inclusion, education, and her experience in the world as an autistic woman. Her work includes the children's book Do-Si-Do with Autism, a set of gift books, the poetry and essay collection Are Your Eyes Listening? Collected Works, and the novel Paul and His Beast.

== Early life and education ==
Sarah Stup is from Frederick, Maryland and was born in 1983. According to her mother Judy Stup, at about age 3, her behavior became "hyperactive and impulsive" as well as "regimented and obsessive", and she eventually mostly stopped speaking. At age 8, she began pointing to letters on an alphabet sheet to spell out words. Stup first attended a school for children with disabilities, and transferred to public school in fourth grade after she learned how to type.

Stup graduated from a public high school in Frederick in 2004. During high school, The Arc of Frederick County developed a writing internship for Stup to support her interest in a writing career, and the school provided one-on-one support services. Stup then began having her writing published, including in magazines and a newspaper.

== Writing career ==
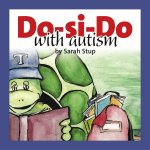

In 2006, Stup published Do-Si-Do with Autism, a children's book about an autistic turtle named Taylor. The story follows Taylor as he goes to school and interacts with classmates. The book also includes advice from Stup for readers with friends and classmates with autism. To create the book, Stup worked with Kevin Walla, a job coach she was connected with through the Arc of Carroll County, to find funding, publishing contacts, and illustrators Matt Starchack and Libby Sanders who developed the images based on Stup's descriptions. Funding for publishing the book was supported by the Maryland Developmental Disabilities Council, the Arc of Carroll County, and the Maryland State Department of Education Division of Rehabilitation Services.

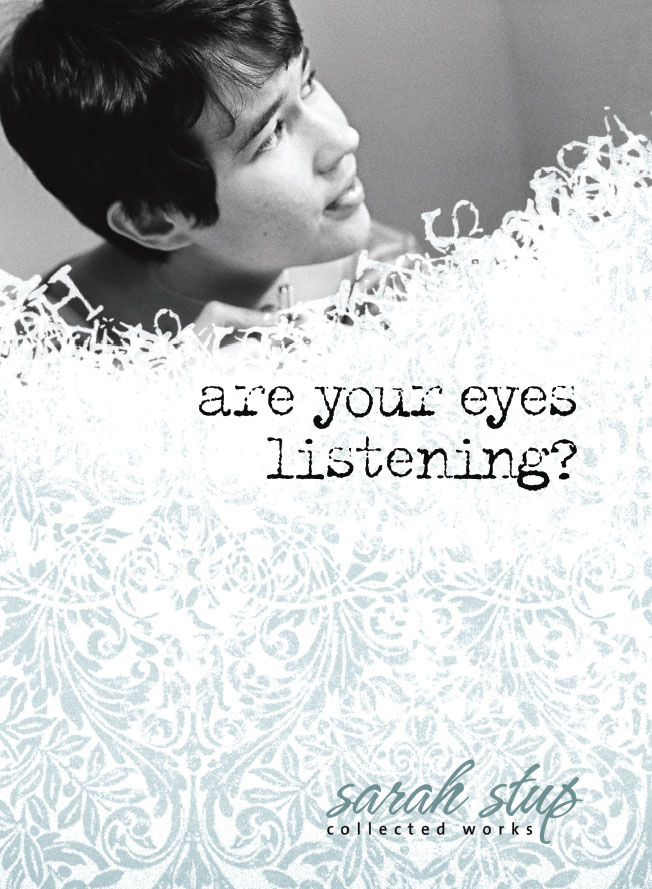

In 2007, Stup published Are Your Eyes Listening? Collected Works, which is a collection of poetry and essays about her experiences with autism. In 2008, she began publishing Sarah's Keepsake Collection, a set of gift books with themes that include life, love, family, and nature, titled Nest Feathers and Heart and Spirit.

Do-Si-Do with Autism led to the development of the Taylor the Turtle Fun Pack CD as an interactive component, and then the Autism Friendship Kit, a CD/DVD/MP3 resource first published in 2014 to support children with and without autism in the development of meaningful relationships.

In 2015, Stup published the novel Paul and His Beast, for middle school-aged children, where Stup refers to autism as Paul's beast. Kirkus Reviews writes, "Stup, who has autism and types to speak, presents an understandable child's-eye view of the condition, poignantly capturing both Paul's need and hate for the Beast. Her characterization is three-dimensional; for example, Paul's autism doesn't make him saintly, and popular kids aren't always jerks." The novel also includes "a readers' guide, suggestions for activities, and tips for welcoming people with disabilities".

As of 2023, Stup is working on her latest book, tentatively titled My Autism, My Journal.

== Advocacy ==
Those with developmental disabilities and other differences are real people inside bodies that work differently. We are worth knowing.

— Sarah Stup

In 2004, Stup participated in the self-advocacy group Working Together and The Arc of Frederick County Legislative Committee's letter-writing campaign. The campaign aimed to educate lawmakers on legislative decisions that would impact the lives of people with developmental disabilities and their families. Stup traveled to Maryland's State Capital in Annapolis to give testimony opposing a bill that promoted the use of institutional respite care and services for people with medical needs, rather than providing services in their own communities. Stup presented written testimony in opposition.

As part of her advocacy, Stup also worked with the Arc to develop Hope's Ingredients, a training curriculum designed to support students with developmental disabilities who are transitioning from school into careers.

== Selected works ==
- Do-si-Do with Autism (2006)
- Are Your Eyes Listening? Collected Works (2007)
- Heart and Spirit: Words to comfort, share and inspire (2008)
- Nest Feathers: A celebration of family, home and memories shared (2009)
- Do-si-Do with Autism Friendship Kit (2014)
- Paul and His Beast (2015)

== Awards and honors ==
In 2004, Stup received both the Self Advocate of the Year award from The Arc of Maryland and the Frances and Lease Bussard Award for Self-Advocacy. In 2022, the governor of Maryland honored Stup with an Award for Outstanding Accomplishments in Disability Culture.
