= Nic Balthazar =

Belgian film director

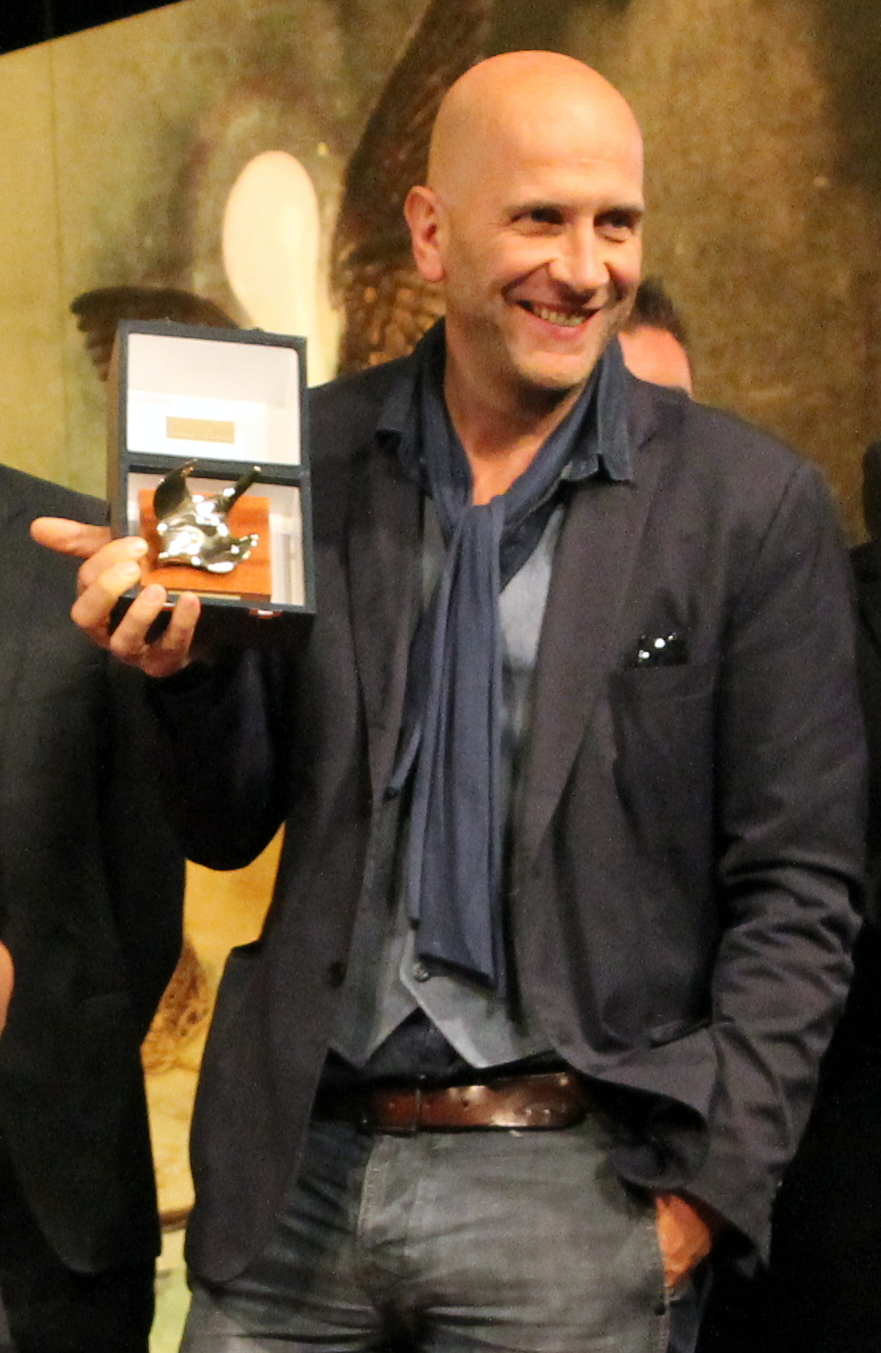
- Nic Balthazar at the 2012 Seminci
- Born: 24 July 1964 (age 61); Ghent, Belgium
- Occupation(s): Film director, television and radio presenter
- Spouse: Lieve Blancquaert

Nic Balthazar (born 24 July 1964 in Ghent) is a Belgian film director and a TV/radio personality (presenter, reporter, producer).

== Family ==
Balthasar was born into a Ghent family of politicians active in the Socialistische Partij Anders. He is the son of Herman Balthazar, professor and former Governor of East Flanders, and brother of Tom Balthazar, a Schepen of Ghent.

== Career ==
His first movie, Ben X, came out in 2007 and has received critical acclaim. The film is based on Balthazar's novel Nothing Was All He Said. The next feature film which Balthazar directed, Tot Altijd, was released in January 2012.

== Filmography ==
Film

Year	Title	Director	Writer
2007	Ben X	Yes	Yes
2012	Tot Altijd	Yes	Yes

Short film

Year	Title	Director	Writer	Notes
2008	The Big Ask	Yes	Yes	Also producer and actor
2009	The Big Ask Again: Dance for the Climate	Yes	Yes	

== Television/radio ==
=== Presenter ===
- Memphis
- Ziggurat
- Open doek
- Mollen en kruisen
- Leuven Centraal
- Dood doet leven - Radio 1
- filminformation - Studio Brussel
- Levende Lijven (talkshows)
- Filmfan - Canvas
- Vlaanderen Vakantieland - Eén

=== Appearances ===
- Boeketje Vlaanderen (1984) - BRT
- Koste wat het kost (1997)
- Het swingpaleis (1997–1998) (Eén)
- Vlaanderen vakantieland (2003) - Eén
- Fata Morgana (2006) - Eén
- Tour 2008 - Eén
- Masterchef (2010) - Vtm
- De jaren stillekes (2010) - Eén

== Awards and nominations ==
Year	Award	Category	Title	Result	Ref.
2007	Montreal World Film Festival	Grand Prix des Amériques	Ben X	Won	
2007	Montreal World Film Festival	Most Popular Film	Ben X	Won	
2007	Montreal World Film Festival	Prize of the Ecumenical Jury	Ben X	Won	
2007	Palm Springs International Film Festival	Heineken Red Star Award	Ben X	Won	
2007	Sedona International Film Festival	Audience Award	Ben X	Won	
2008	European Film Awards	People's Choice Award for Best Film	Ben X	Nominated	
2011	Efebo d’Oro	Best book adaptation	Ben X	Won	

== External links (further sources) ==
Media related to Nic Balthazar at Wikimedia Commons

- Nic Balthazar at IMDb
- Nic Balthazar on facebook
- Ben X (First Movie)
