= As We See It =

American comedy-drama television series

- Promotional poster
- Genre: Comedy drama
- Based on: On the Spectrum by: Dana Idisis; Yuval Shafferman
- Developed by: Jason Katims
- Starring: Rick Glassman; Albert Rutecki; Sue Ann Pien; Sosie Bacon; Chris Pang; Joe Mantegna
- Composer: Jonathan Sanford
- Country of origin: United States
- Original language: English
- No. of seasons: 1
- No. of episodes: 8

Production
- Executive producers: Jason Katims; Jesse Peretz (pilot); Jeni Mulein; Danna Stern
- Producers: Devin Rich; Dara Weintraub
- Production location: Los Angeles, California
- Cinematography: Tim Bellen
- Editors: Angela Catanzaro; Garret Price
- Running time: 30 minutes
- Production companies: True Jack Productions; Yes Studios; Universal Television; Amazon Studios

Original release
- Network: Amazon Prime Video
- Release: January 21, 2022

As We See It is an American comedy drama television series created by Jason Katims, based on the Israeli series On the Spectrum by Dana Idisis and Yuval Shafferman. The eight-episode series premiered on Amazon Prime Video on January 21, 2022. In October 2022, the series was canceled after one season.

== Synopsis ==
The series follows roommates Jack, Harrison and Violet, all in their 20s, all of whom are autistic, as they look for work, make friends, and fall in love.

== Cast ==
- Rick Glassman as Jack Hoffman
- Albert Rutecki as Harrison Dietrich
- Sue Ann Pien as Violet Wu
- Sosie Bacon as Mandy, aide for Jack, Harrison, and Violet
- Chris Pang as Van Wu, Violet’s brother
- Joe Mantegna as Lou Hoffman, Jack's father
- Vella Lovell as Salena, Van's girlfriend
- Tal Anderson as Gia
- Alyssa Jirrels as Nicole Dietrich, Harrison's sister
- Casey Mills as Julian (episodes 2–6)
- David Futernick as John
- Délé Ogundiran as Ewatomi Kokomo
- Andrew Duff as Douglas

== Episodes ==
No.	Title	Directed by	Teleplay by	Original release date
1	"Pilot"	Jesse Peretz	Jason Katims	January 21, 2022
Three roommates in their 20s, Jack, Harrison, and Violet, who are autistic, living in an apartment together supported by aide Mandy, strive to navigate a world that eludes them.
2	"I Apologize for My Words and Actions"	Jaffar Mahmood	Ian Deitchman & Kristin Robinson	January 21, 2022
Violet flirts with a delivery guy named Julian at her workplace. Harrison befriends a latchkey kid named AJ living in the building. Jack endangers his job security.
3	"When Violet Met Douglas"	Jaffar Mahmood	Michelle Sam	January 21, 2022
Violet asks Van's girlfriend Salena for dating advice. Jack presses Lou's nurse for more information about his father, Lou’s diagnosis. AJ and Harrison's forbidden friendship secretly continues. Mandy gives her two weeks' notice.
4	"The Violetini"	David Boyd	Jason Katims	January 21, 2022
Violet anxiously prepares for her birthday party, all the while excited by progress with Julian. Meanwhile, Jack and Harrison scramble to find dates for the party.
5	"Ever Had an Edible?"	David Boyd	Romi Barta	January 21, 2022
Jack and Lou bond together when the latter’s illness become more visible. Mandy receives unexpected news from Harrison's parents, further complicating her future plans. Violet plans to take things to the next level with Julian.
6	"Fear Is My Bitch"	Allison Liddi-Brown	Denise Hahn	January 21, 2022
The roommates each struggle in their love lives - Violet spirals as her relationship with Julian fails to match her expectations, Jack tries to make things right with Ewatomi to win her forgiveness in return, and Harrison develops an unrequited crush.
7	"Outed"	Allison Liddi-Brown	Jesikah Suggs	January 21, 2022
Jack goes through an existential crisis. Douglas helps to change Violet's perspective on life. Feeling betrayed by Mandy, Harrison ventures out on his own.
8	"Please Don't Leave"	Jenée LaMarque	Jason Katims	January 21, 2022
On the day of Harrison's sister's graduation party, he struggles with several changes. Confronted with the reality of Lou's illness, Jack turns to Ewatomi for support. Feeling like she's losing control over her life, Violet lashes out at Van. The line between Mandy's personal and professional lives continues to blur.

== Production ==
=== Development ===
On March 14, 2019, it was revealed that Amazon Prime Video was set to distribute the American TV series adaptation of On the Spectrum, with Jason Katims writing and executive producing. True Jack Productions' Jeni Mulein and Yes Studios’ Dana Stern also executive produced. On October 11, 2021, the title was revealed to be As We See It. Jesse Peretz directed and executive produced the pilot episode. On October 20, 2022, Amazon Prime Video canceled the series after one season.

=== Casting ===
On June 12, 2019, Rick Glassman, Sue Ann Pien, Albert Rutecki, Sosie Bacon and Chris Pang were cast in the series. Glassman, Pien, and Rutecki, like their characters, are all autistic. On October 11, 2021, Joe Mantegna was announced as a cast member.

== Release ==
On October 11, 2021, the first look photos for the series were released. On November 22, 2021, the official trailer was released. All eight episodes of the series premiered on Prime Video on January 21, 2022. On October 20, 2022, the streamer canceled the series after one season.

== Reception ==
The review aggregator website Rotten Tomatoes reported a 90% approval rating with an average rating of 8/10, based on 30 critic reviews. The website's critics consensus reads, "As We See It deftly sidesteps schmaltz by depicting people on the spectrum as well-rounded individuals with their own foibles, enriching both the comedy and pathos." Metacritic, which uses a weighted average, assigned a score of 82 out of 100 based on 17 critics, indicating "universal acclaim".

Daniel Feinberg wrote for The Hollywood Reporter that it is "a heartfelt mixture of mostly earned tears and laughter."
