= Sue Ann Pien =

American actress

Sue Ann Pien (born 1979 or 1980) is an American actress.

After a variety of minor roles in television and film, she rose to prominence with her role as Violet Wu in As We See It. Like the rest of the main cast, both the character and actress are autistic. She was nominated for Outstanding Performance in a New Series at the 32 Annual Gotham Awards and Best Lead Performance at the 38th Independent Spirit Awards.

She also participated in the Mars One program, and was among the 100 finalists who reached round three (out of over 200,000 applicants).

Pien is a lesbian.

== Filmography ==
Television performances
Year	Title	Role	Notes	Source
2022	Extraordinary Attorney Woo	Woo Young-woo	English dub voice	
2022	As We See It	Violet Wu		
2023	The Ghost and Molly McGee	June Chen	Voice role; season 2	
