= Ben X =

2007 film by Nic Balthazar

- Theatrical release poster
- Directed by: Nic Balthazar
- Screenplay by: Nic Balthazar
- Based on: Nothing Was All He Said by Nic Balthazar
- Produced by: Peter Bouckaert
- Starring: Greg Timmermans; Laura Verlinden; Marijke Pinoy
- Cinematography: Lou Berghmans
- Edited by: Philippe Ravoet
- Music by: Praga Khan; Arno
- Production companies: MMG Film & TV Production; Bos Bros. Film-TV Productions
- Distributed by: Bridge Pictures (Netherlands); Kinepolis Film Distribution (Belgium)
- Release dates: 26 September 2007 (Belgium); 8 November 2007 (Netherlands)
- Running time: 93 minutes
- Countries: Belgium; Netherlands
- Language: Dutch
- Box office: $2.7 million

Ben X is a 2007 Belgian-Dutch psychological thriller film based on the novel Nothing Was All He Said (Dutch: Niets Was Alles Wat Hij Zei) by the film's director Nic Balthazar. It stars Greg Timmermans as a teenager with Asperger syndrome who finds solace in the MMORPG ArchLord as a result of severe bullying. The film's title is a reference to the leet version of the Dutch phrase "(ik) ben niks", meaning "(I) am nothing". The novel itself was inspired by the true story of a boy with autism who committed suicide because of bullying.

The film won three awards at the 31st Montreal World Film Festival: the Grand Prix des Amériques, the Prix du Public for the most popular film, and the Ecumenical Jury Prize for its exploration of ethical and social values. The film was the Belgian entry for the Academy Awards 2007 in the category Best Foreign Language Film but failed to receive the actual nomination.

== Plot ==
Teenage Ben is frequently bullied at school. To escape his harsh reality, he turns to a virtual world by playing an online game, ArchLord. In the game, he is a confident and brave hero. Moreover, he collaborates his adventures with another online user known in-game as Scarlite.

One day, Ben is being bullied again. During the class break, the bullies drag Ben on top of a table and pull his pants down, while classmates record the incident on their phones. With cruel remarks and teasing from his classmates, Ben becomes so humiliated and frustrated that he smashes the window with a chair. Ben is immediately sent to the headmaster's office, where the headmaster asks Ben to explain the incident. Ben, however, does not speak at all, leaving the issue unresolved. Following that scene, it's revealed that Ben has been diagnosed with Asperger syndrome, a form of autism. Things gets worse for Ben as the class incident gets posted on the internet. Feeling distraught about his life in general, Ben is even ready to leave his virtual world behind, where he tells Scarlite that he is ready to "endgame". Concerned, Scarlite sends a video message to Ben X (as Scarlite has no idea what Ben looks like) saying that there cannot be an endgame, unless there is a healer. Scarlite then tells Ben to meet her at the train station.

At the train station, Ben sees Scarlite, but does not go to her. Scarlite, assuming that Ben did not show up at all, goes to the train. Ben follows Scarlite onto the train and sits next to her, feeling nervous and excited at the same time. Just as the train approaches Brussels, Scarlite asks Ben if he is all right. Ben does not reply and goes off, leaving Scarlite behind. Having not talked to Scarlite, Ben was contemplating suicide by jumping off the platform. As Ben was ready to jump, he is pulled back and it's revealed that it's Scarlite who did so. She later tells Ben that he can choose to either give up and take his own life or take revenge and fight, just like he would in Archlord. But, to make the decision, he needs to devise a plan.

Ben (with Scarlite) asks his parents to help. He has decided to commit suicide by jumping off the ferry. He does so, and captures the suicide on tape. Afterwards, a funeral was held for Ben, with everybody, including the bullies being present. As the funeral went on, the video then changes to Ben and his speech (which seems like a suicide note video). In the video, the bullies are exposed (as well as the classmates involved) of what they have done to Ben that day of the incident. Then, to everyone's shock, it was revealed that Ben is alive, by his shadow seen over the video and Ben being seen from the projecting room. It turns out that Ben had chosen to take revenge on the bullies by faking his own suicide. It was revealed that as he jumped off the ferry, his parents had caught him at the lower deck, as part of the plan.

Afterwards, Ben, Scarlite, his mother, and his brother are at a horse ranch in the country. The horse instructor shows Ben how to be friendly with the horse and tells him that "You must learn to feel, in order to feel good". Ben touches the horse gently, just as the instructor told him and feels happy. Ben then goes to Scarlite and talks to her. The horse instructor looks baffled, as it is revealed that Ben is actually talking to himself. Ben's mother then tells the horse instructor that everything is fine and Ben is happy.

== Cast ==
- Greg Timmermans as Ben
- Laura Verlinden as Scarlite
- Marijke Pinoy as Ben's mother
- Cesar De Sutter as Jonas
- Pol Goossen as Ben's father
- Titus De Voogdt as Bogaert
- Maarten Claeyssens as Desmedt
- Tania Van der Sanden as Sabine
- Peter De Graef as Psychiatrist
- Ron Cornet as Headmaster
- Johan Heldenbergh as Religion Teacher
- Jakob Beks as Metallurgy Teacher
- Gilles De Schryver as Coppola
- Dirk Van Dijck as Policeman 1

== Soundtrack ==
Ben X Originele muziek van de film CD with music from the film was released in 2007 in Belgien by EMI Music Belgium.

== Awards and nominations ==
Year	Award	Category	Result
2007	Montreal World Film Festival	Grand Prix des Amériques	Won
2007	Montreal World Film Festival	Most Popular Film	Won
2007	Montreal World Film Festival	Prize of the Ecumenical Jury	Won
2007	Palm Springs International Film Festival	Heineken Red Star Award	Won
2007	Sedona International Film Festival	Audience Award	Won
2008	European Film Awards	People's Choice Award for Best Film	Nominated
2011	Efebo d’Oro	Best book adaptation	Won

== Other media ==
In 2012, the film was adopted into theatrical play by Frank Van Laecke. Ben X - De Musical CD was released the same year.

In 2013, Erik Leijonborg adapted the film into a Swedish-language remake, IRL.

In 2015, the film was adapted into a graphic novel, drawn by NDurlie, the pseudonym of Veerle Colle.

== See also ==
- Autism-friendly
- List of Belgian submissions for the Academy Award for Best International Feature Film
