= List of Alphas characters =

This is a list of characters from the television series Alphas, which premiered in 2011 on SyFy in the United States.

== Main characters ==
- Dr. Lee Rosen (David Strathairn) – A doctor specializing in the study of people with super abilities that he has dubbed Alphas. He leads a government-sponsored team of Alphas to help identify and aid other Alphas or stop dangerous ones. Dr. Rosen is cultured and well traveled; he is fluent in such languages as Swahili, Chinese, and some obscure Hindi dialect. Currently, there is no confirmation on Dr. Rosen's status, or if he is presumed deceased, during the events of Season 2's cliffhanger.
- Gary Bell (Ryan Cartwright) – An autistic prodigious savant young man who lives with his mother and is socially functional to a degree. His ability of Transduction allows him to view, and interact with, natural electromagnetic radiation, man-made wireless communication, and process information faster than any computer. He states, however, that he is unable to process signals using a Nokia platform. Gary's ability can be used in a number of ways ranging from tracking people by hacking surveillance cameras, to decoding an entire language as seen in Season 1, Episode 4, "Rosetta". He's also been seen streaming videos, checking (or most times hacking) e-mails, and in Episode 5, "Never Let Go", even logged onto Twitter. Recently, events motivated Gary into creating the Anna Lives site. He is immune to Nina's "Push" ability, an ability Dr. Rosen attributed to Gary's autism, meaning he has unique cellular structure and neurochemistry.
- Cameron Hicks (Warren Christie) – A former U.S. Marine whose Alpha ability is hyperkinesis, which gives him superhuman balance, aim, and reflexes. He can also predict the trajectory of objects in motion. This makes him a perfect shot and allows him to dodge bullets or trip a running person to cause him to fall into a specific position. His hyperkinesis also allows him to retrace the path of a projectile from only the apparent end result. His ability is linked to his emotional state and is inconsistent when he is extremely stressed or agitated.
- Rachel Pirzad (Azita Ghanizada) – A former CIA linguist and highly sensitive person whose Alpha ability is to heighten her senses of sight, smell, taste, hearing, and touch to extreme levels, any one of them at a time, at cost of sensory processing which can leave her vulnerable. (See: visual, auditory, tactile, olfaction, gustatory, vestibular, and proprioception). She can view things at a microscopic level or smell things by chemical composition. She also appears to have the ability to detect when people are lying, by judging microexpressions, increased sweat, pupil dilation, and increased heart rate. Rachel also seems to have extensive knowledge of chemicals, food ingredients, and fabrics. Dr. Rosen speculated that she's been aware of her Alpha abilities since birth. In the episode "Never Let Me Go", she confided that her family always wanted to "cure her" of her condition's "unusual side-effects" (such as sensory overload, selective sound sensitivity, and extreme sensitivity to germs) directly caused by her Alpha ability. She lived with Alpha teammate Nina Theroux for a while before moving back with her parents while Dr. Rosen was locked up for trying to reveal the existence of Alphas to the world. Her family are Afghan immigrants, where her father was a doctor but his medical license is not recognised in the United States. He is now the owner of a dry cleaning business for many years. A recurring plot line is Rachel's family trying to find her a husband. Her friendship with Nina is ruined when Nina, overwhelmed by her abilities, pushes Rachel to kiss her at a club, and took many episodes for her to forgive her. She can overcome exposure of someone if she has repetitive contact with them. John Bennett is currently trying to establish a relationship with her.
- Nina Theroux (Laura Mennell) – A carefree individual who has the Alpha ability to 'push' people into doing whatever she asks of them. This form of persuasive mind control requires her to not only provide verbal commands, but she must also have eye contact with the individual she is pushing. It is revealed that Nina cannot push everyone she pleases. As her abilities work like hypnosis, some individuals are more resistant to the influence of her suggestions. It is revealed that Alpha partner Gary is just such an individual. It is also revealed that she is not immune to the influence of other pushers. It is alluded to that out of all of the groups she has been with Dr. Rosen the longest. Because of her time with Rosen, Nina constantly expresses her fears of being the next to be institutionalized. She later reveals that she pushed her ex-boyfriend to suicide by accident during a time when she didn't fully comprehend her Alpha ability. Despite her carefree nature, Nina has shown a more sincere, caring side like when she offered Rachel a place to stay after being moving out of her parents’ house. A running gag is that Nina always has a different car that she "Borrows", implying that she pushes others to lend their keys to her. In the episode "When Push Comes To Shove", it is revealed Nina first used her ability on her father who wanted to leave, but she pushed him to stay; it was later shown that her father had been unable to leave for work because '... he couldn't leave' and required her to push him again to allow him to go to work. However, despite Nina's attempts to make her father stay, the stress of wanting to leave but never being allowed to by Nina caused her father to commit suicide. Her ability appears to be getting stronger with continual use; originally she could push for a few minutes, but can now make it last for over half a day. She takes a break from the team in season two, her abilities taking hold so she is soon pushing people regularly, including making an old boyfriend believe he's in love with her again. She tries to kill herself but is stopped by Hicks. Despite what she's done, Rosen chooses to bring her back to the team and continues to try to help her.
- Bill Harken (Malik Yoba) – A former FBI agent with the ability to activate his endocrinal 'fight or flight' response at will, resulting in increased durability and superstrength. He is also able to increase his running speed using this same manner, running nearly as fast as an escaping vehicle, and almost as fast as an Alpha running at ten times the normal human level. Extended periods of time in this heightened state (approx. 5 minutes) results in excessive strain on his heart which could lead to a heart attack. Due to the nature of his Alpha ability, Harken proves resistant to the influence of chemical manipulations in the brain (e.g. showing resistance to the pheromone–induced aggression).
- Kat (Erin Way) – A mysterious, free-spirited young loner whose Alpha ability allows her procedural memories to pick up any skill at a glance. The downside to her condition, which has plagued her entire life, is that her declarative memories are short-lived and her experiences fade away after a short amount of time (usually a month). Becoming a member of the team provides a purpose and direction for Kat and working with Dr. Rosen may help her reclaim her lost past.

== Secondary characters ==
=== Recurring Federal Agent characters ===
- Nathan Clay (Mahershala Ali) – The head of a tactical unit within the U.S. Department of Defense tasked with dealing with rogue Alphas. Does not trust Nina with her ability, and never gives her eye contact, without glasses on. Doesn't like working with Dr. Rosen and his team but helps to release Dr. Rosen in the beginning of the second season as he needs his help. Often threatens to put Dr. Rosen back in his cell. In season 2, he has been given a promotion as shown by John Bennett taking over as the head of the tactical unit for Rosen's team.
- Kathy Sullivan (Valerie Cruz) – Asks Nina not to give her eye contact in fear of being pushed. Doesn't have much respect for the alphas or Dr. Rosen. In the end of season one she refuses to listen to Dr. Rosen which ends with many unnecessary deaths, including Anna's.
- John Bennett (Steve Byers) – Is the new head of tactical analysis for Rosen's Team. His role is similar to Nathan Clay's in season 1. It is revealed that he has scars on his chest from when he was in war. Due to the scars he is reluctant to have a relationship with anyone but it doesn't stop Rachel and him from trying to have one. He is currently trying to establish a relationship with Rachel.

=== Recurring Red Flag characters ===
- Stanton Parish (John Pyper-Ferguson) – Believed to be the founder and head of Red Flag. An immortal Alpha—well over 150 years old, having fought in the US Civil War—as he has outlived his known family, including 31 grandchildren, his last being a granddaughter. His ability involves accelerated cellular regeneration (or complete cellular control) as shown by how he survived getting shot in the head during the Civil War. He is working to foment a new civil war between the Alphas and regular humans. He appears to be close to Dr. Rosen's daughter in several episodes. He always seems to know where Dr. Rosen is, often appearing to talk with him out of the blue to give him cryptic messages. It is believed that he is losing some of his memory due to old age, which suggest his body repairing system only repair direct damage.
- Cornell Scipio (Elias Toufexis) – A sadistic Alpha who now works for Stanton Parish as his right-hand man. His ability, often activated when stressed or angry, produces a mix of chemical "sweat" through his skin to convert into a highly flammable substance and, when friction is added, cause combustion. He engineers the escape of many Alphas out of the prison in the end of Season One. He later gets his ability boosted through exposure to the August Medical device. It is revealed in the Season Two episode "Need to Know" that he burned his parents and his sister to death when he was a child by burning his family home on purpose. It is also revealed that only his hands are fireproof, meaning he can burn his own skin.
- Jeff Kowalka (aka 'Dumpy') (Jameson Kraemer) – An Alpha who works for Stanton Parish, he has abilities similar to Bill Harken, allowing himself to increase his adrenaline flow, granting him temporary strength and reflexes. He is extremely violent and when using firearms often burns through the ammo quickly which may be a side effect of his increased adrenaline levels.

=== Other recurring characters ===
- Skylar Adams (Summer Glau) – An Alpha who is a former acquaintance of Dr. Rosen and Nina. She has an intuitive genius that allows her to understand complex devices and to construct new ones even from ordinary household appliances. In the Season 1 episode "Catch and Release", it is revealed that her daughter is also an Alpha, and Dr. Rosen arranges for them both to go into hiding. She makes a special cell phone for Gary to use if they need to contact her.
- Zoe 'Digit' Adams (Skyler Wexler) – The daughter of Skylar Adams, she is the first known "second generation" Alpha and is able to comprehend and compute mathematics at a level far beyond the capability of a normal human brain.
- Tyler Hicks (Gage Munroe) – The son of Cameron Hicks. Although it is unknown whether he has Alpha powers, this is suggested in the Series 2 episode "Fallen", when he nonchalantly tosses an empty drinks can so that it falls into the correct recycling bin after two bounces.
- Dr. Vanessa Calder (Lindsay Wagner) – A crossover character from Warehouse 13, who first appears in Alphas in the Season 2 episode "Never Let Me Go", establishing that the two shows (along with Eureka) share the same continuity.

== List of other known Alphas ==
- Jessica Elkhart (Isabella Hofmann) – An Alpha with the ability to induce oxytocin addiction via touch. The recipients of her touch feel loved by Jessica and though not mind-controlled exactly, will feel compelled to do whatever Jessica wants. If Jessica intentionally breaks off her 'love' by hurting the person (emotionally) the affected individual's brain, as a result of heightened stress, starts rapidly mass-producing cortisone in such a large quantity that it leads to cellular breakdown and eventual death.
- "Griffin" (Rebecca Mader) – A mercenary for hire whose real name is unknown. She has the Alpha ability to make herself undetectable to the human eye. Dr. Rosen theorizes that this is done by her being able to 'broadcast' some sort of signal that swells the human 'blindspot,' making it seem like she is invisible. This is not true invisibility as she is still visible to electronic recording devices.
- Eric Latrobe (Tom Barnett) – An Alpha with the ability to read people's expressions and body language, sensing whether or not they're lying. He was arrested after using his powers as a confidence trickster and placed in Binghamton where he was used to analyse prisoners under interrogation.
- Matthew Hurley (Devon Graye) – A remorseless Alpha who can release airborne pheromones which drive nearby people into violent rages, even to the point of killing each other.
- Isaac Hale (Evan Sabba) – An Alpha assassin working for Red Flag and Stanton Parish. He possesses the ability of advanced necrosis, which accelerates any living organism's rate of decomposition. His ability requires him to be within range of his victim, but he does not need to directly contact the target. The more complicated and complex the organism, the longer the necrosis takes; an example of this is when he kills a flower almost instantly, but takes several seconds to kill a human.
- Megan Bates (Alex Paxton-Beesley) – An Alpha with the ability to control or overload electrical equipment; both have been shown to require direct contact. Her main method in affecting equipment involves direct contact with high powered cables, but a side effect of her ability requires her to go into a trance like state making her vulnerable. She used this ability to aide in the Building Seven escape by creating false images on the security cameras.
- Kimi Milard (Sarah Slywchuk) – An Alpha who works for Stanton Parish, her ability is similar to Nina Theroux in that she appears to be able to 'push' or use hypnosis on people. She appears to have no difficulty in using her ability to make other people commit suicide. It is also noted that when she does push people she often kisses them; this suggests that her manipulation requires a trigger, much like real life hypnosis.
- Ted Asher (Dylan Smith) – One of the Alphas who escaped from Building Seven and works for Stanton Parish. His Alpha ability is to find weak spots in any target. It's suggested he punched a hole in the wall for the prisoners to escape; it has yet to be established if he also possess superhuman strength, or if he just used his ability to locate and exploit the weak spots in the wall.
- Perlich (Mike Tyrell) – A Former Red Flag Alpha who was partners with Milos Kosar; his ability is to detect movement (or sense incoming danger) by using the hairs on his arms, like a lateral line on fish.
- Jason Miller (Connor Price) – An Alpha who was originally seen in a vegetative state. Due to a piece of medical equipment called an infrasound stimulator, which measures brain activity, he has developed to the ability to project infrasound, which can affect people's brains, especially Alphas. Alphas accidentally affected had hallucinations, and the closer they got to Jason, the stronger the infrasound affected their minds. It's believed that Jason became comatose while almost drowning; this meant the infrasound signal he was sending out translated as "Help me, I'm drowning," which caused Adam Gordon and nearly Rachel Pirzad to drown themselves. In a later episode, it is revealed that a side effect of the repetitive use of the infrasound stimulator on him allows him to mind-control multiple people, making them believe whatever he wants them to believe. This ability of his is believed to be linked to him controlling infrasound signals in the brain, and his use links them all together into an almost hive mind. His control of them can also cause hematomas in the brain, which can kill his victims if they are not released in under a few weeks. Jason is the second Alpha in the series run who was experimented on by Stanton Parish to increase his ability. It is loosely stated that Dr. Rosen and his team "woke" Jason up before Parish was done experimenting on him.
- Gower – An Alpha who can generate an electromagnetic pulse through his hands. This ability can be used to either stop machinery such as a car's engine, or act like a defibrillator to someone's heart.
- Claude (Conrad Coates) – An Alpha with abilities similar to Gary. He is able to control bees using electromagnetic radiation. HE can also see the electromagnetic radiation from most natural objects, such as rocks or trees, which he taught to Gary. He was the leader of the Alphas living in the forest, where Skylar momentarily lived.
- Bip (Nathan Stephenson) – An Alpha with similar abilities of "Griffin." The difference appears to be that he appears to block people's nearby perspectives of him. However, he can be seen by people out of his range and it still requires him to be as quiet as possible, encouraging him to wear special shoes to remain silent.
- Trisha (Kaniehtiio Horn) – An Alpha with hyperkinesis similar to Cameron Hicks. Hicks fought her sister at Highland Mills.
- Shelley (Azra Valani) – An Alpha who can reshape her human tissue making her skin into something like a Kevlar Vest or Dragon Skin. Her ability appears to be transmitted in her blood, which allows her ability to cover her entire body quickly (like a shield around the person). Her blood was adapted and turned into the Alpha-based Drug called 'Jump.' The effects of the drug give the user temporary invulnerability from impact, allowing someone to survive falling off of very tall buildings. However, a side effect seen is one that can sometimes coat the human heart, causing heart failure.
- Agnes Walker (Kandyse McClure) – An Alpha who can access people's minds and see their memories and thoughts. Her ability requires direct contact and causes pain to the victim, but she also experiences some of their pain. Unlike most Alphas, she apparently cannot turn off her ability. It is also possible to block some thoughts from her mind through certain chemicals and mental reinforcement by an Alpha who can 'push' like Nina.
- Eddie (Kyle Labine) – An Alpha who sees electrical conductivity, or the movement of electricity, which he sees like the electric flow on a circuit board; he currently works for Stanton Parish.
- Brian Kessler (Arnold Pinnock) – An Alpha who can send electricity through his hand like a high powered Taser.
- Jane Kessler (Zoe Doyle) – An Alpha who can Amp up like Bill Harkin, she appears to be slightly more prone to mental attacks.
- Adam – A Baby Alpha who can emit the Hormone vasopressin, which causes a feeling of protection of the baby and is present in birth parents.
- Mitchell (Sean Astin) – An Alpha who has the ability to record people's memories and replay them to other people as if it was their own memory. His ability requires direct contact and can only record or recover what a person can remember; for example he tried to pull a memory for Kat but could only get a small addition part of the memory. Stanton Parish uses Mitchell to record his personal memories so he wouldn't forget them. A side effect of his ability is that he cannot distinguish what memories are his or other peoples.
- Vince (Stefano DiMatteo) – An Alpha who can alter a person's dream environment. He can control two or more people at a time. However, if he is not there constantly manipulating the victim, the dream is prone to inconsistencies.

== List of deceased fictional characters ==
=== Deceased Federal Agent characters ===
- Don Wilson (Callum Keith Rennie) – An FBI agent who has worked with Dr. Rosen in the past. He tends to not respect or take Dr. Rosen seriously. Is often frustrated with Alphas and fails to see any point of view but his own. This irony is compounded by the fact that he is forced to rely on a team of them to solve many of his cases. His tentative friendship with Dr. Rosen is strongly challenged by his contempt for the Alphas he works with. Wilson was killed in the third episode, "Anger Management," when, under the influence of an anger-pheromone-generating Alpha, one of his own men beat him to death with a chair.

=== Deceased Red Flag characters ===
- Anna Levy (Liane Balaban) – A dyspraxic Alpha who has the ability to understand any language acting like a Rosetta Stone, but whose disability prevents her from communicating normally. Although a senior member of Red Flag, she also maintained a friendship with Gary up until the time of her death during the season 1 finale. She was shot by government agents; ironically although her ability allowed her to understand any language, because of her Dyspraxia she could not tell the government agents not to shoot her. She makes an appearance in the hospital when Jason is making other Alphas hallucinate.
- Milos Kosar (Dean Armstrong) – An Alpha with the ability to generate electricity. He served Red Flag and was in the same house as Anna, he and his partner Perlich escaped, leaving everyone to believe that he was the one pulling the strings. He committed suicide igniting a fuel tanker to destroy a shipment of Anti–Alpha drugs.
- Dr. Gordon Kurn (Brent Spiner) – A obstetrician associated with Red Flag who was providing pregnant women with prenatal vitamins containing active human Alpha DNA in the hopes of encouraging the birth of new Alphas. Born without any optic nerve, Dr. Kurn is effectively blind if not for his Alpha ability to generate sonic sonar which he can use to "see" like a bat or dolphin and in a similar manner to the Marvel Comics superhero Daredevil. He can also generate resonating vibrations which over time create cracks in building structures and burst the blood vessels of nearby people. He was killed by Griffin while he was distracted by Bill.

=== Other deceased Alpha characters ===
- Danielle Rosen (Kathleen Munroe) – Dr. Rosen's daughter, who is a former drug addict. Her Alpha ability allows her to alter people's emotions when touching them. She was working with Stanton Parish behind the scenes to feed info to him and Red Flag before he killed her in an explosion. In the episode "Falling", it is revealed that she can act as an emotional conduit between two people, allowing Cameron and his son, Tyler, to both experience each other's emotions.
- The Ghost (Jeff Seymour) – An Alpha with the ability to push people, especially by touch. He had obsessive compulsive disorder and was always neat and tidy. His form of pushing would cause people to hear and see things that weren't really there (like when Cameron Hicks saw and heard "Time to Kill" everywhere). When his hand was exposed, it was disfigured and that was the hand he always touched people with when he pushed them. His pushing was long-term (instead of just a few minutes) and usually was triggered by some type of auditory or visual cue (noise in cell phone for Hicks). He was killed by Hicks. He underestimated Hicks' ability to use Hyperkinesis under stress by using Rachel as a human shield; this however made Hicks focus more intently and ricochet a bullet into his back.
- Marcus Ayers (Will McCormack) – A former patient of Dr. Rosen, and an Alpha with the ability to predict incredibly complex chains of causes and effects. He was known for leaving cryptic, but symbolic clues as to where he is going and what he is planning next. He also demonstrated complex but useful ways to set off events that resulted in the deaths of specific people, but this ability left him fundamentally unable to comprehend that other people didn't see the world the same way as he did, often attaching deliberately malicious intent to relatively chance events. He used his ability (and a quarter) to escape from an ambulance and walked away only to call and report the accident. He is meticulously paranoid and would never knowingly walk into a trap, though he did on purpose in order to "die" so he wouldn't end up in another government holding facility.
- Eli Aquino (C. Thomas Howell) – An Alpha who has an enlarged suprachiasmatic nucleus granting him the ability to allows his body to go at ten times the speed of a human; but at the cost of accelerating his own ageing process: despite the fact that Eli is 22, his body and face are that of a fifty-year-old man. His speech pattern also accelerates when he is nervous or angry. He claims to have been experimented on to increase his ability, which is causing his aging process; this was confirmed in the later episode 'Gods and Monsters' in which Stanton Parish has done experiments improving Alpha abilities which may have led to his accelerated aging. He was killed by an unknown shooter just as Danielle Rosen is convincing Eli to surrender. Because of this Dr. Rosen informs his group that since Nathan Clay seems no longer in control of his forces, they can no longer trust anyone in the government.
- Jack Duffy (Jason Gosbee) – An Alpha with the ability of bioelectrogenesis, much like an electric eel but releasing the electrical charge through his hands. He was one of the Building Seven escapees. He was killed by Ivan Bazevich.
- Ivan Bazevich – (Deceased) An Alpha with the ability of spitting hydrochloric acid, like a spitting cobra; he was a fighter in the Alpha Fight Club.
- Adam Gordon (Noah Reid) – A former patient of Dr. Rosen, who possesses the ability of being able to climb walls and ceilings; although his ability is not given much details it is believed to be much like in the 2002 Spider-Man film in which microscopic hairs hook on to surfaces giving him wall-crawling abilities.
- "Caretaker" (Gavin Fox) – An Alpha who worked for Stanton Parish; his job was to protect the alpha known as Mitchell as Parish used him to store personal memories. The Caretaker's Alpha ability was to rapidly repair the broken bones in his body; even to the point of un-breaking a broken neck. In order to repair his bones he requires a lot of calcium and can drink up to six pints of milk. While he is repairing his bones he increases in mass causing he to increase in weight. It is this part of his ability which caused his death: Kat rammed a truck into him crushing him behind a car and driving him into a lake, due to his increased mass while trying to reheal he drowned.
- Jonas Englin (Garret Dillahunt) – An Alpha with the ability of Bliss Inducement. He runs a cult in Connecticut made up of ex-addicts and other damaged people. The drawback of Jonas' ability causes death. At an AA meeting that Hicks is attending, non-alcoholic Jonas speaks up and says he can help everyone there. An angelic glow spreads from Jonas. The next morning, an uncharacteristically happy Hicks shows up in Nina’s bedroom, inviting her to come meet Jonas. Later on, Bill attempts to rescue them, but Jonas uses his Alpha ability on him as well, preventing him from saving Hicks and Nina, who believe they need no saving. He then plans on burning down his place believing it will save the people but when Dr. Rosen comes and saves people from his ability but just when Jonas is about to use his ability on Rosen, Dr. Rosen shoots him in the face preventing him from killing everyone.

== See also ==
- List of psychic abilities
