= Not Dead Yet =

American sitcom

- Genre: Sitcom
- Created by: Casey Johnson & David Windsor
- Based on: Confessions of a Forty-Something F**k Up by Alexandra Potter
- Starring: Gina Rodriguez; Hannah Simone; Lauren Ash; Rick Glassman; Joshua Banday; Angela E. Gibbs; Brad Garrett
- Music by: Transcenders
- Country of origin: United States
- Original language: English
- No. of seasons: 2
- No. of episodes: 23

Production
- Executive producers: Gina Rodriguez; McG; Mary Viola; Corey Marsh; Dean Holland; Casey Johnson; David Windsor
- Producers: Andrew Brooks; Kathia Sanchez-Aldana; Justin McEwen; Alexandra Potter; Eddie Quintana; Debbie Jhoon; Michael J. Feldman; Daniel Portnoy
- Cinematography: Mark Schwartzbard; Giovani Lampassi; Grant Smith
- Editors: Thomas M. Bolger; Dan Riddle; Scott Ashby; Jeremy Cohen
- Camera setup: Single-camera
- Running time: 20–22 minutes
- Production companies: Windsor & Johnson Productions; Wonderland Sound and Vision; 20th Television

Original release
- Network: ABC
- Release: February 8, 2023 – April 24, 2024

Not Dead Yet is an American television sitcom created by David Windsor and Casey Johnson for ABC. It is based on Confessions of a Forty-Something F**k Up by Alexandra Potter. The series premiered on February 8, 2023. In May 2023, the series was renewed for a second season which premiered on February 7, 2024. In May 2024, the series was canceled after two seasons.

== Plot ==
=== Season 1 ===
When Nell (Gina Rodriguez) comes back to work at her old job at SoCal Independent she finds out she's assigned to writing obituaries. Then, she finds out her best friend, Sam (Hannah Simone) is now also close friends with Nell's boss and enemy, Lexi (Lauren Ash). When Nell gets her first assignment, Monty (Martin Mull), she meets his widowed wife, Cricket (Angela E. Gibbs), who owns a bar. Nell and Cricket become close friends and Nell almost tells Cricket she sees ghosts. During Season 1, Nell and Edward (Rick Glassman), her roommate, become enemies to friends and help each other with relationships. At the end of Season 1, Nell's ex-fiancé, Phillip (Ed Weeks) comes to Pasadena, California. First, Nell is still very mad at him as well as Sam and Dennis (Joshua Banday), but they make up and start dating, until Nell tells Phillip she sees ghosts and he says they should move away and she should quit her job. Nell breaks up with Phillip for good. Dennis and his husband Ben start fostering twins at the end of Season 1.

=== Season 2 ===
At the beginning of Season 2, Lexi's father, Duncan (Brad Garrett), whom she always tries to impress, visits their office. Duncan asks Nell to help him write his obituary and help him be a better person, but Nell finds out it's just to make Lexi work harder and he has not changed. Sam and her husband Keith (Adhir Kalyan) start having marital issues and eventually get a divorce. Lexi and Edward start hooking up, but Edward doesn't tell Nell. They later start officially dating. Nell meets TJ (Jesse Garcia), a coworker, and they start dating. When Nell brings babies into the conversation and looks into freezing her eggs, TJ reveals he never has wanted to have kids and they decide to break up but remain friends. That same episode, Edward finds out Duncan is selling SoCal Independent and tells Lexi and Nell. Everyone goes into a panic. During all the chaos Duncan collapses and is taken to the hospital but also appears as Nell's ghost. Duncan has heart surgery and survives. Lexi decides to take matters into her own hands and buy out the company. Duncan and Lexi's relationship slowly restores as he understands that Lexi is grown up.

== Cast and characters ==
=== Main ===
- Gina Rodriguez as Nell Serrano, a journalist whose wedding plans with Phillip fell apart, resulting in her moving back to Los Angeles from London. Her full first name is Penelope. She's best friends with Sam.
- Hannah Simone as Sam, Nell's best friend who is the style editor at the SoCal Independent. In Season 2, she has marital issues with her husband.
- Lauren Ash as Lexi, Nell's boss and the editor-in-chief at the SoCal Independent
- Rick Glassman as Edward, Nell's autistic roommate. He is frenemies with Nell.
- Joshua Banday as Dennis, Nell's co-worker and an associate editor at the SoCal Independent. He assigns obituaries for Nell to write. Starting at the end of Season 1, he and his husband foster two children.
- Angela E. Gibbs as Cricket, a widowed owner of a bar that specializes in wine. She is the widow of the first ghost Nell meets.
- Brad Garrett as Duncan Rhodes (season 2), the publisher of the SoCal Independent and Lexi's father

=== Recurring ===
- Maile Flanagan as Tina, a gruff, somewhat antisocial co-worker at the SoCal Independent
- Jimmy Bellinger as Mason, an intern at the SoCal Independent
- Jesse Garcia as TJ (season 2), a sportswriter at the SoCal Independent and die-hard Cubs fan

=== Notable guest stars ===
- Martin Mull as Monty, the first ghost Nell encounters and Cricket's late husband
- Mo Collins as Jane Marvel
- Brittany Snow as Piper, Nell's high school bully
- Rory O'Malley as Ben, Dennis' husband
- Don Lake as Rand
- Julia Sweeney as Terri Lawrence, a parody of Shari Lewis
- Tony Plana as Carlos Garza, a sportscaster whom Nell and her father admired when she was growing up
- Paula Pell as Marlena, a former soap actress.
- Ed Begley Jr. as Bill, a former music teacher who was Susie's husband
- Telma Hopkins as Susie, a former music teacher who was Bill's wife
- Rhea Perlman as Janice
- Ed Weeks as Phillip, Nell's former fiancé
- Adhir Kalyan as Keith, Sam's husband
- Nico Santos as Teddy (season 2), a former realtor
- Lidia Porto as Diana (season 2)
- Tommy Martinez as Andres (season 2)
- Annie O'Donnell as Estelle (season 2)
- Wendie Malick as Mary Sue Manners (season 2)
- Rob Corddry as Andrew Michaels (season 2), a former IRS Auditor who believes that he was murdered
- Cedric Yarbrough as Paul (season 2), Andrew's neighbor and the main suspect in his murder investigation
- Chelsea Handler as Sharon (season 2)
- Marla Gibbs as Nana Sugar, Cricket's mother (season 2)
- Matt Walsh as Frederick P. Moreau (season 2)
- Jenifer Lewis as Donna (season 2)
- Malcolm Barrett as Quentin (season 2)

== Episodes ==
=== Series overview ===
Season	Episodes	Originally released	
Season	Episodes	First released	Last released
1	13	February 8, 2023	May 3, 2023
2	10	February 7, 2024	April 24, 2024

=== Season 1 (2023) ===
No. overall	No. in season	Title	Directed by	Written by	Original air date	Prod. code	U.S. viewers (millions)
1	1	"Pilot"	Dean Holland	Casey Johnson & David Windsor	February 8, 2023	1JVN01	3.61
2	2	"Not a Tiger Yet"	Todd Holland	Marc Firek	February 8, 2023	1JVN02	2.88
3	3	"Not Out of High School Yet"	Gail Mancuso	Josh Greenberg	February 15, 2023	1JVN06	2.26
4	4	"Not Dating Yet"	Melanie Mayron	Maggie Mull	February 22, 2023	1JVN04	2.38
5	5	"Not Moving on Yet"	Dean Holland	Chelsea Devantez	March 1, 2023	1JVN05	2.16
6	6	"Not Ready to Share Yet"	Chris Koch	Becky Mann & Audra Sielaff	March 8, 2023	1JVN03	2.11
7	7	"Not Out of the Game Yet"	Shahrzad Davani	Eddie Quintana	March 15, 2023	1JVN07	2.09
8	8	"Not Friends Yet"	Gail Lerner	Michael J. Feldman & Debbie Jhoon	April 5, 2023	1JVN08	2.07
9	9	"Not Scattered Yet"	Dean Holland	Eddie Quintana & Michael J. Feldman & Debbie Jhoon	April 12, 2023	1JVN13	2.06
10	10	"Not Well Yet"	Michael McDonald	Josh Greenberg	April 19, 2023	1JVN12	2.28
11	11	"Not Feeling It Yet"	Anya Adams	Mattie Bayne	April 26, 2023	1JVN09	1.65
12	12	"Not A Fairytale Yet"	Claire Scanlon	Marc Firek	May 3, 2023	1JVN10	2.10
13	13	"Not Just Yet"	Dean Holland	Teleplay by : Becky Mann & Audra Sielaff; Story by : Amy Sullivan	May 3, 2023	1JVN11	1.78

=== Season 2 (2024) ===
No. overall	No. in season	Title	Directed by	Written by	Original air date	Prod. code	U.S. viewers (millions)
14	1	"Not Owning It Yet"	Dean Holland	Marc Firek	February 7, 2024	2JVN01	2.56
Lexi's father, Duncan Rhodes (Brad Garrett), arrives at the SoCal Independent and promptly takes over, ratcheting up Lexi's anxieties, especially when he starts to favor Nell, who is tasked with writing his obituary on top of writing one for her latest ghost, Teddy, Pasadena's number one realtor. Lexi and Edward form an unexpected connection.
15	2	"Not a Valentine Yet"	Dean Holland	Chelsea Devantez	February 14, 2024	2JVN02	2.59
On Valentine's Day, Cricket gives Nell love advice that convinces her to stop using ghosts to avoid pursuing love. Nell deals with the ghost of Senator Diana Fernandez, who encourages her to date her son Andres, an artist who struggles with his paintings.
16	3	"Not in the Cards Yet"	Michael McDonald	Debbie Jhoon & Michael J. Feldman	February 21, 2024	2JVN03	2.28
Nell babysits Sam's daughter Tilly, who seems more interested in hanging out with Edward, much to Nell's chagrin. Lexi takes Sam and Dennis to an awards ceremony, which isn't what it seems. Sam reveals her marriage troubles to Nell.
17	4	"Not Polite Yet"	Melanie Mayron	Eddie Quintana	February 28, 2024	2JVN04	2.33
Lexi combines the first two floors of the SoCal Independent, which leads to Nell sharing a desk with TJ, a sportswriter who is friendly with everyone else except Nell. Encouraged by her latest ghost, etiquette expert Mary Sue Manners, Nell discovers why and tries to mend fences with TJ.
18	5	"Not Solved Yet"	Dean Holland	Becky Mann & Audra Sielaff	March 13, 2024	2JVN05	2.19
Nell's latest ghost, an accountant named Andrew Michaels (Rob Corddry), is convinced that he was murdered. Nell's investigation into the matter catches the unsolicited help of Lexi, which leads to an unexpected bonding between the two and a surprising reveal for Nell. Dennis tries to face one of his fears and Sam craves a girl's night.
19	6	"Not Going Home Yet"	Michael McDonald	Josh Greenberg	March 20, 2024	2JVN06	2.22
Nell becomes frustrated with Edward and Lexi's relationship, especially when Lexi begins to have doubts and tries to enlist Nell's help. A freeway fire results in the SoCal Independent pulling an all-nighter, where TJ and Nell begin to bond, Dennis leading the charge in the newspaper coverage, and Sam's desire to help results in her babysitting Mr. Rhodes. Nell's latest ghosts are bickering law firm partners Jerry Grady and Greg Blitt.
20	7	"Not in the Game Yet"	Keith Powell	Liz Astrof	April 10, 2024	2JVN07	2.20
The SoCal Independent takes on KQUT, a local news station, in a softball game. Duncan makes Nell the coach due to her competitive nature, while Dennis tries to make his ex-girlfriend, who is on the opposing team, jealous. Nell and TJ continue to bond during the game, with Sam coaching Nell on how to flirt and Duncan's rivalry with KQUT head Sharon Darynson leads him to place a $1,000,000 wager on the game.
21	8	"Not You Yet"	Natalia Anderson	Mattie Bayne	April 17, 2024	2JVN08	2.11
Nell decides to freeze her eggs; due to this, she cannot drink, especially when Sam celebrates her divorce, and invites Nell, Lexi and Cricket. While dealing with her latest ghost, writer Frederick P. Moreau (Matt Walsh), she also plans a date with TJ, debating how to tell her about freezing her eggs. Edward's attempts to surprise Lexi for their one-month anniversary result in him spending time with Duncan, which ends with Edward learning a secret about the SoCal Independent.
22	9	"Not the End Yet"	Melissa Fumero	Grace Condon	April 24, 2024	2JVN09	2.15
Edward tells Nell and Lexi that Duncan is selling the SoCal Independent. With no help from Lexi, Nell takes matters into her own hands, backed up by her latest ghost, former SoCal Independent editor Donna Hill. At Nell's birthday party, she invites the new corporate representative, Quentin, with whom Nell goes to great lengths to stop the sale, while Sam and Dennis attempt to hype each other up to him to keep their jobs.
23	10	"Not a Ghost Yet"	Dean Holland	Casey Johnson & David Windsor	April 24, 2024	2JVN10	2.15
Duncan has collapsed and is rushed to the hospital for heart surgery. He appears to Nell as a ghost, while Quentin, the corporate representative, attempts to poach employees from the SoCal Independent. Nell takes a shot at a job, while being coached by Duncan's ghost. At the hospital, Lexi deals with her father's health issues and unresolved feelings, with support from Sam and Edward.

== Production ==
=== Development ===
On February 14, 2022, Not Dead Yet was given a pilot order by ABC. On May 13, 2022, Not Dead Yet was picked up to series by ABC. The series is created by David Windsor and Casey Johnson who are expected to executive produce alongside Rodriguez, McG, Mary Viola and Corey Marsh. 20th Television and Wonderland Sound and Vision serve as production companies for the series. Dean Holland directed the pilot. On May 16, 2023, ABC renewed the series for a second season. On May 10, 2024, ABC canceled the series after two seasons.

=== Casting ===
On March 29, 2022, Gina Rodriguez was cast in the lead role. On April 5, 2022, Josh Banday, Jessica St. Clair, Mary Elizabeth Ellis, Angela Gibbs, and Rick Glassman joined the cast as series regulars. On May 14, 2022, it was reported that Rodriguez, Banday, and Gibbs were the starring cast members to stay on as series regulars, due to creative tweaks. While it was initially reported that Glassman was set to continue on the series as recurring, he ended up being a series regular. In August 2022, Hannah Simone and Lauren Ash were cast as series regulars. On January 11, 2023, it was announced that Martin Mull, Ed Begley Jr., Mo Collins, Deborah S. Craig, Telma Hopkins, Don Lake, Rhea Perlman, Paula Pell, Tony Plana, Brittany Snow, and Julia Sweeney would appear in different episodes as ghosts. On December 13, 2023, it reported that Brad Garrett was cast as a new series regular for the second season. On January 30, 2024, it was announced that Wendie Malick, Nico Santos, Rob Corddry, Tommy Martinez, Lidia Porto, Annie O'Donnell, Jesse Garcia, and Cedric Yarborough were set to guest star for the second season. Several days later, it was reported that Chelsea Handler and Marla Gibbs were cast to guest star. On April 10, 2024, it was announced that Jenifer Lewis, Malcolm Barrett, and Matt Walsh were set to guest star for the second season.

== Broadcast ==
Not Dead Yet premiered on February 8, 2023, on ABC. The second season premiered on February 7, 2024.

== Reception ==
=== Critical response ===
The review aggregator website Rotten Tomatoes reported a 50% approval rating with an average rating of 6.5/10, based on 16 critic reviews. The website's critics consensus reads, "While an always engaging Gina Rodriguez is enough to ensure that this supernatural comedy isn't dead on arrival, it'll need more spark to survive viewer disinterest." Metacritic, which uses a weighted average, assigned a score of 58 out of 100 based on 15 critics, indicating "mixed or average reviews".

=== Ratings ===
==== Overall ====
Viewership and ratings per season of Not Dead Yet
Season	Timeslot (ET)	Episodes	First aired		Last aired		TV season
Season	Timeslot (ET)	Episodes	Date	Viewers (millions)	Date	Viewers (millions)	TV season
1	Wednesday 8:30 p.m. (1); Wednesday 9:30 p.m. (2–11, 13); Wednesday 9:00 p.m. (12)	13	February 8, 2023	3.61	May 3, 2023	1.78	2022–23
2	Wednesday 8:30 p.m. (1–9); Wednesday 9:00 p.m. (10)	10	February 7, 2024	2.56	April 24, 2024	2.15	2023–24

==== Season 1 ====
Viewership and ratings per episode of Not Dead Yet
No.	Title	Air date	Rating (18–49)	Viewers (millions)
1	"Pilot"	February 8, 2023	0.4	3.61
2	"Not a Tiger Yet"	February 8, 2023	0.4	2.88
3	"Not Out of High School Yet"	February 15, 2023	0.3	2.26
4	"Not Dating Yet"	February 22, 2023	0.4	2.38
5	"Not Moving on Yet"	March 1, 2023	0.3	2.16
6	"Not Ready to Share Yet"	March 8, 2023	0.3	2.11
7	"Not Out of the Game Yet"	March 15, 2023	0.3	2.09
8	"Not Friends Yet"	April 5, 2023	0.3	2.07
9	"Not Scattered Yet"	April 12, 2023	0.3	2.06
10	"Not Well Yet"	April 19, 2023	0.4	2.28
11	"Not Feeling It Yet"	April 26, 2023	0.3	1.65
12	"Not A Fairytale Yet"	May 3, 2023	0.2	2.10
13	"Not Just Yet"	May 3, 2023	0.2	1.78

==== Season 2 ====
Viewership and ratings per episode of Not Dead Yet
No.	Title	Air date	Rating (18–49)	Viewers (millions)
1	"Not Owning It Yet"	February 7, 2024	0.3	2.56
2	"Not a Valentine Yet"	February 14, 2024	0.3	2.59
3	"Not in the Cards Yet"	February 21, 2024	0.2	2.28
4	"Not Polite Yet"	February 28, 2024	0.3	2.33
5	"Not Solved Yet"	March 13, 2024	0.3	2.19
6	"Not Going Home Yet"	March 20, 2024	0.2	2.22
7	"Not in the Game Yet"	April 10, 2024	0.3	2.20
8	"Not You Yet"	April 17, 2024	0.2	2.11
9–10	"Not the End Yet / Not a Ghost Yet"	April 24, 2024	0.2	2.15

=== Accolades ===
The series was one of 200 television series that received the ReFrame Stamp for the years 2022 to 2023. The stamp is awarded by the gender equity coalition ReFrame and industry database IMDbPro for film and television projects that are proven to have gender-balanced hiring, with stamps being awarded to projects that hire female-identifying people, especially women of color, in four out of eight key roles for their production.

Year	Award	Category	Nominee(s)	Result	Ref.
2023	Imagen Foundation Awards	Best Actress - Comedy (Television)	Gina Rodriguez	Nominated	
2024	Astra TV Awards	Best Actress in a Broadcast Network or Cable Comedy Series	Gina Rodriguez	Nominated	
2024	Astra TV Awards	Best Writing in Broadcast Network or Cable Comedy Series	Casey Johnson, David Windsor	Nominated	
2024	Astra TV Awards	Best Casting in a Comedy Series	Anthony J. Kraus	Nominated	
2024	Astra TV Awards	Best Broadcast Network Comedy Series	Not Dead Yet	Nominated	
