= Nothing Was All He Said =

Book by Nic Balthazar

- Author: Nic Balthazar
- Original title: Niets was alles wat hij zei
- Language: Dutch/Flemish
- Publisher: Averbode
- Publication date: 2003
- Publication place: Belgium
- Pages: 136
- ISBN: 978-90-317-2272-3

Nothing Was All He Said (Dutch: Niets was alles wat hij zei) is a 2003 Belgian novel written by Nic Balthazar. The book is based on the real story of an autistic teenager from Ghent, named Tim, who committed suicide because of bullying. Balthazar would later also direct the film adaptation Ben X in 2007. Balthazar wrote the book to raise awareness to how grave the consequences of bullying can be.

== Plot ==
The book tells us the story of Ben. He is a seventeen-year-old boy from Ghent who has Asperger syndrome and gets bullied in school because of this. He considers suicide, but meets a girl online, nicknamed 'Barbie', whom he falls in love with. They set up a meeting, and as Ben tries to commit suicide by jumping in front of an arriving train, he gets rescued by Barbie. Together, they fake his suicide and expose his bullies at his funeral. After this, Ben tries to live a normal life.

== Real story ==
This book is based on the true story of an autistic Flemish teenager who committed suicide because of bullying. He died by jumping off the Gravensteen in Ghent.

== Adaptations ==
The novel was adapted into a film Ben X, theatrical play by Frank Van Laecke and a graphic novel by NDurie, the pseudonym of Veerle Colle.
