= India Holton =

New Zealand romance author

India Holton is the pen name of a New Zealand writer known for the fantasy romance and romcom book series Dangerous Damsels and Love's Academic.

She purposefully shares limited information about her life. Holton is autistic and her books feature neurodivergent characters.

== Career ==
Holton wrote The Wisteria Society of Lady Scoundrels while querying a different book. Feeling it was a stronger novel, she pulled the first book and began querying Lady Scoundrels, for which she received an offer from her literary agent, Taylor Haggerty. The book was sent to auction and bought by Berkley Publishing.

In fall 2021, Holton signed with Berkley for what would become the second and third books of the Dangerous Damsels series.

In late 2025, Holton sold three new books via auction to Arcadia, an imprint of Quercus. The publisher announced that two will be similar in style to her previous series, the third a romantic horror novel.

She has cited Howl's Moving Castle by Diana Wynne Jones and Romancing the Stone as influences.

== Published works ==
=== Dangerous Damsels ===
==== Novels ====
- The Wisteria Society of Lady Scoundrels, June 15, 2021
- The League of Gentlewomen Witches, March 15, 2022
- The Secret Service of Tea and Treason, April 18, 2023

==== Short story ====
- "The Wild Wedding", March 3, 2024

=== Love's Academic ===
- The Ornithologist's Field Guide to Love, July 23, 2024
- The Geographer's Map to Romance, April 8, 2025
- The Antiquarian's Object of Desire, April 21, 2026

=== Standalone ===
- Wishspun, forthcoming, March 2027

== Reception ==
Holton's debut novel, The Wisteria Society of Lady Scoundrels, was named by The New York Times as one of its 100 Notable Books of 2021. The New York Times Book Review called it "the kind of book for which the word 'rollicking' was invented", highlighting its balance between silly melodrama and emotional depth. Kirkus Reviews praised the comedic use of the novel's Victorian setting, noting the "ironic distance between readers' expectations of the proprieties in historical romance (including steampunk) and the topsy-turvy rules" governing the characters' lives.

The third book of the Dangerous Damsels trilogy, The Secret Service of Tea and Treason, was lauded by Publishers Weekly: "This may be Holton’s best yet." For Paste Magazine, Allison Nichols highlighted the novel's comedy and romance, though thought the organization at the center of the story (the Agency of Undercover Note Takers, or A.U.N.T) was underdeveloped in comparison to that of the previous two books, and overall found it to be higher stakes.

Publishers Weekly complimented The Ornithologist's Field Guide to Love for its twist on the enemies-to-lovers trope, calling it a "sweet, wholesome love story". Locus Mag noted the book's worldbuilding, saying of Holton: "While staying firmly in her chosen era and including all the plummy drama of an overexaggerated upper class British setting, she has an absolute party creating magical birds". The novel appeared on the USA Today Best-selling Booklist for July 31, 2024.
