= Alexei Maxim Russell =

Canadian writer

- Born: Winnipeg, Manitoba
- Occupation: Writer
- Writing career
- Genres: Crime, fantasy, philosophy, folklore
- Notable work: Trueman Bradley series

Alexei Maxim Russell is a Canadian writer of fiction and non-fiction. He is most notable as the creator of Trueman Bradley. Trueman Bradley is a fictional character in a series of detective novels, with an international following. Bradley is characterized as a genius detective with Asperger's syndrome. His work has developed a cult following in educational and advocacy circles, having been added to school lesson plans and officially adopted as educational material for government programs, which focus on disability awareness and equality.

== Career ==
Russell's debut novel, Trueman Bradley – Aspie Detective, was published in 2011 by Jessica Kingsley Publishers. This novel was the first detective novel to feature an openly autistic detective as a protagonist and was the first work of fiction to portray Asperger syndrome as a "different way of thinking", with some advantages over the neurotypical way of thinking—and therefore, not necessarily a disability. A German-language edition was published in 2013 by Von Loeper Literaturverlag, of Karlsruhe, Germany. His other works include Trueman Bradley – The Next Great Detective and Instruction Manual for the 21st Century Samurai.

Having relocated to Szczecin in 2021, Russell is currently developing a sequel to Trueman Bradley, with the narrative set partially in Italy and partially in Szczecin.

== Style ==
CM magazine described Trueman Bradley as "Somewhat reminiscent of the bold private detective genre of Hammett's The Maltese Falcon, along with a nod to Haddon's central character in The Curious Incident of the Dog in the Night-Time, the book also has its own unique style ...". According to BFK Books: "Russell's writing style is pleasant and easy, reminiscent of the simplicity and innocence of Alexander McCall Smith."

Alexei describes his methods as "ridiculously protagonist based". As he describes it: "the character takes over, at some point, and I find myself dictating what I see, rather than writing it. Protagonists do come to life, in this way, for some authors. It may sound metaphysical to some, but this is what makes believable, living characters."

== Following ==
Alexei's work has gained a cult following in advocacy and educational circles. His first novel, Trueman Bradley – Aspie Detective was added to the book lesson plan for grade 6 students, by the Cromwell Center for Disabilities Awareness, of Portland, Maine, in 2015. And was officially adopted, in that same year, by Ireland's Department of Justice and Equality, as official teaching material for their "Someone Like Me" program, for primary schools—designed to encourage understanding of disabilities in their students and encourage and instil the "celebration of difference" in children.
