= Naomi Foyle =

British writer

- Naomi Foyle
- Born: 22 February 1967 (age 59); London, United Kingdom
- Occupations: poet, novelist, essayist, editor, translator, activist
- Writing career
- Genre: British literature
- Website: www.naomifoyle.com

Naomi Foyle (born 22 February 1967) is a British-Canadian poet, novelist, essayist, editor, translator and activist. For her poetry and essays about Ukraine, she was awarded the 2014 Hryhorii Skovoroda Prize.

== Life and career ==
Her book, Seoul Survivors, was praised by The Guardian.

Library Journal recommended the series The Gaia Chronicles "for Hunger Games fans of all ages". "Astra", the first book in the series, was a Litro Book Club Read in 2014. Astra an Arts Council England-funded theatre adaptation of Naomi Foyle's eco-science fiction quartet The Gaia Chronicles, written by Naomi Foyle with Raven Kaliana of Puppet (R)Evolution, and designed and directed by Raven Kaliana, won the 2022 Brighton Fringe ONCA Green Curtain Award for work that engages artists and audiences with social and environmental challenges. Working with a new international team, Naomi Foyle is now upscaling ASTRA into an epic trilogy of plays.

Naomi Foyle is Poetry and Fiction Editor of Critical Muslim, the journal of the Muslim Institute. and the editor of over thirty volumes of poetry including A Blade of Grass: New Palestinian Poetry (Smokestack Books, 2017). As a co-founder with Judith Kazantzis and Irving Weinman of British Writers in Support of Palestine (2010–2018), Naomi Foyle played a leading role in national letter writing campaigns in support of the academic and cultural boycott of Israel.

In 2021, Foyle disclosed on her blog that she had been diagnosed with autism the previous year at the age of 53.

== Selected publications ==
=== Prose ===
- Seoul Survivors Jo Fletcher Books, 2013, ISBN 978-1-78087-600-9
- Astra: Book One of the Gaia Chronicles Jo Fletcher Books, 2014. ISBN 978-1-78087-636-8
- Rook Song: Book Two of the Gaia Chronicles Jo Fletcher Books, 2015. ISBN 978-1-78206-921-8
- The Blood of the Hoopoe: Book Three of the Gaia Chronicles Jo Fletcher Books, 2016. ISBN 978-1-78206-924-9
- Stained Light: Book Four of the Gaia Chronicles Jo Fletcher Books, 2018. ISBN 978-1-78206-927-0

=== Poetry collections ===
- The Night Pavilion, Waterloo Press, 2008. ISBN 978-1-906742-05-8
- The World Cup, Waterloo Press, 2010. ISBN 978-1-906742-21-8
- Adamantine Red Hen/Pighog Press, 2019. ISBN 978-1-906309-41-1
- Salt & Snow, Waterloo Press, 2025. ISBN 978-1-915241-21-4

=== Poetry pamphlets ===
- Curdled Cream: A Collection of Snarls. Kinkos, Toronto. 1990.
- Febrifuge treeplantsink press, 1996
- Citas Impossibles/Impossible. Engagements, 1997
- Forgive the Rain: more exceptionally useless poems. Back Pack Press, 1997 [2nd Ed. 1999]
- Songs from the Blood Shed Window Grate Press, 1996 [2nd ed 2000]
- Aphrodite's Answering Machine: Erotic Vignettes. Urban Pillow, 2002
- Red Hot & Bothered. Lansdowne Press, 2003
- Canada. Echo Room Press, 2004
- Grace of the Gamblers: A Chantilly Chantey. Waterloo Press, 2010 ISBN 978-1-906742-17-1
- No Enemy but Time. Waterloo Press, 2017
- Importents. Waterloo Press, 2021, ISBN 978-1-906742-75-1

=== Edited anthologies & collections (with introductions) ===
- Mairtin Crawford: Selected Poems. Lagan Press, 2005
- A Blade of Grass: New Palestinian Poetry. Smokestack Books, 2017, ISBN 978-0-9957675-3-9

=== Co-translations ===
- Enemies Outside / Enemigos Afuera by Mori Ponsowy. Translated by Mori Ponsowy and Naomi Foyle, ISBN 978-1-906742-25-6
- Wounds of the Cloud by Yasser Khanger. Al Ma'mal Foundation, 2016. Translated by Naomi Foyle, Marilyn Hacker and Do'a Ali, ISBN 978-90-825649-1-4
