= On the Spectrum (TV series) =

Israeli television series

- Genre: Comedy drama
- Created by: Dana Idisis; Yuval Shafferman
- Screenplay by: Dana Idisis
- Directed by: Yuval Shafferman
- Starring: Niv Majar; Naomi Levov; Ben Yosipovich
- Composers: Tal Even-Tzur; Guy Levi
- Country of origin: Israel
- Original language: Hebrew
- No. of seasons: 1
- No. of episodes: 10

Production
- Executive producers: Udi Segal; Amit Gitelson; Shlomit Arviv
- Cinematography: Guy Raz
- Editor: Maya King-Bentevich
- Running time: 30 minutes
- Production company: sumayoko

Original release
- Network: Yes
- Release: May 22 – July 24, 2018

On the Spectrum (Hebrew: על הספקטרום, romanized: Al Haspectrum) is an Israeli comedy-drama television series created by Dana Idisis and Yuval Shafferman and produced by Yes TV and Sumayoko Productions. The series premiered in Israel on May 22, 2018. The show won Best Drama Series in the 2018 Israeli Ophir Awards.

The show won the 2018 Grand Jury Prize in the French Series Mania festival, making it the second Israeli series to claim the award. It is the first Israeli show that been accepted into the Tribeca Film Festival and the only non-English show at the festival in 2018.

In 2020, Amazon Studios picked up the series for an English remake adaptation called As We See It, after ordering a pilot in 2019.

In 2021, HBO Max bought the series' rights for North American streaming. The series is available with subtitles and also dubbed with voice actors who are on the spectrum. The series first aired on the platform on April 2 to coincide with Autism Awareness Day.

== Plot ==
The show follows the life of three roommates in their 20s with autism living together in an assisted-living apartment in Ramat Gan.

== Characters ==
=== Main characters ===
- Amit (Ben Yosifovitz): Moderate functioning autistic person that is still trying to grasp basic daily activities. His best friend is Erez. He is in love with the waitress Lior and entered her apartment by mistake, which she perceives as harassment.
- Zohar (Naomi Levov): Beautiful woman with borderline intelligence who works in the kitchen of an Aroma store, until the owner of the store fires her due to her brother's conduct towards workers and then she works in a library in a mall. She is longing to be in a romantic relationship. She has an older brother named Asher who looks after her once their parents died.
- Ron "Ron-Ron" Shulman (Niv Major): 33 year old computer expert. He has Asperger's Syndrome. He is interested in products and the shopping channel. He tends to stay at home due to Agoraphobia. He is blunt with his speech, obsessed about telling the truth and has poor social skills.

=== Secondary Characters ===
- Erez Danino (Avi Dangur): Best friend of Amit. He lives in a hostel and constantly talks about moving to his own apartment.
- Asher (Ori Gat): Older brother of Zohar, who serves as her protector and guardian since the death of their parents. He was dating Milli, but she left him due to his irritability.
- Yaeli (Tal Yakimov): Case worker for Amit, Ron and Zohar in the first season.
- Noa Hermon (Ruti Holtzman): Neighbor who lives above Ron, Zohar, and Amit and mother of Paz. She dies in the first season, possibly due to drug use.
- Paz Hermon (Sigalit Fox): Daughter of Noa, who inherits Noa's apartment. In a relationship with Ron.
- Lior (Rif Na'aman): New waitress in the neighborhood cafe and aspires to be an actress. Amit accidentally enters her apartment.
- Alex (Itamar Rothschild): Zohar's communication therapist who dated Yaeli.
- Milli (Liraz Hammi): Partner of Asher during the first season. She left him due to his irritability

=== Other characters ===
- Tamir (Nir Strauss): A librarian on the spectrum. Asher asks him to go on a date Zohar.
- Ron (Dor Muskal): Young autistic man who is interested in dating Zohar. He works in a hospital.
- Anna (Ilana Bers): Co-worker of Zohar in Aroma.
- Omar (Shadi Marai): Co-Worker of Zohar in Aroma.
- Avi (Sheral Peterman): Stalker of Zohar who takes pictures of her from his car, but is caught by Asher.
- Shlomit (Genia Snoop): Young woman from Erez's hostel. In a relationship with Erez for a short time.
- Shmarit (Iris Lia Sofer): Young woman in Erez's hostel. Amit was in a relationship with her for a short time.
- Shimon (Jacob Zeda-Daniel): Young man from Erez's hostel. Became religious and set a Mezuzah on the doorframe of Ron, Amit's, and Zohar's apartment.
- Dudi (Ofir Weil): A young guy from Erez's hostel who moves into his own apartment, which upsets a jealous Erez.

== Productions ==
Screenwriter Dana Idisis wrote the series inspired by the life story of her autistic brother, who suffers from pervasive developmental disorder and lives with his friends in sheltered housing.
