= Zac Looker =

British actor

- Education: Barton Pevrill
- Years active: 2023–present
- Television: Geek Girl; Elle

Zac Looker is a British actor. His television roles include Geek Girl (2024) and Elle (2026).

== Biography ==
Looker attended Barton Peveril Sixth Form College in Hampshire, England. He started acting in school plays, and performed with The Young Creatives Portsmouth.

Looker had an early television role as Frank in A Kind of Spark for CBBC alongside Lola Blue. His television roles include portraying Toby in Netflix series Geek Girl.

In 2026, he could be seen as Dustin in Amazon Prime Video series Elle alongside Lexi Minetree, a prequel series to Legally Blonde.

== Filmography ==
Year	Title	Role	Notes
2023	Invasion	Jamila's Older Sibling	1 episode
2023-2024	A Kind of Spark	Frank	14 episodes
2024	Geek Girl	Toby	6 episodes
2026	Elle	Dustin	8 episodes
