= Geek Girl (TV series) =

2024 teen drama television series

- Genre: Teen drama
- Based on: Geek Girl by Holly Smale
- Directed by: Declan O'Dwyer
- Starring: Emily Carey; Emmanuel Imani; Liam Woodrum; Tim Downie; Jemima Rooper; James Murray; Sarah Parish; Sandra Yi Sencindiver
- Composer: Nikhil Seetharam
- Countries of origin: Canada; United Kingdom
- Original language: English
- No. of series: 1
- No. of episodes: 10

Production
- Executive producers: Zoë Rocha; Robbie von Werz; Jeff Norton; Holly Smale; Jessica Ruston; Declan O’Dwyer; Anthony Leo (season 1); Andrew Rosen (season 1); David Fortier (season 2–); Ivan Schneeberg (season 2–); Nick Nantell (season 2–); Jon Rutherford (season 2–)
- Producers: Zoë Rocha; Anthony Leo; Andrew Rosen
- Running time: 28–37 minutes
- Production companies: RubyRock Pictures; Aircraft Pictures; Nelvana; Boat Rocker Studios

Original release
- Network: Netflix (international); StackTV (Canada, season 1)
- Release: 30 May 2024 – present

Geek Girl is a teen drama television series directed by Declan O'Dwyer, based on the 2013 young adult novel of the same name by Holly Smale. The series is produced by Nelvana, RubyRock Pictures, and Aircraft Pictures for Netflix; with producers being Zoë Rocha, Anthony Leo and Andrew Rosen. Geek Girl is about an awkward teenager who unexpectedly becomes a model.

The first season was released on 30 May 2024 on Netflix internationally and on StackTV in Canada, to positive reviews from critics. In April 2025, it was renewed for a second season.

== Plot ==
Harriet Manners is a teenage girl who is both physically and socially awkward; unsure of herself, she is an easy target for the group of school bullies led by Lexi. She finds support in her best friend Nat, her neighbor and fellow eccentric Toby, her father Richard and stepmother Annabel.

When her class wins a contest to attend London Fashion Week, Harriet accidentally draws the attention of modeling agents Wilbur and Betty. Wilbur offers Harriet a chance at working with Infinity Models, though she refuses unless Nat, who has dreamed of becoming a model, also gets a shot. They skip school and defy Harriet's parents to go to London for the trial.

After coaching and encouragement from supermodel Nick, his aunt, fashion designer Yuji, decides that Harriet has what she is looking for and places her in the top spot in her new show, earning Harriet some unpleasant attention from Poppy, Nick's fake girlfriend and the former headliner. Harriet does her best to keep all this a secret from Nat, who is not selected for modeling work.

Harriet and Richard sneak off to the first show in Ottawa, Canada without Annabel's knowledge. They hit some snags and Richard loses his job in the chaos, but Harriet pulls through and becomes a success, though Nat and Annabel are both upset when they learn what has been kept from them. Outside of that, things seem to be going smoothly, and Nick and Harriet begin dating. This draws further attacks from Poppy, whose interference leads to things going so wrong during and after a perfume shoot that Harriet decides to quit modeling.

The CEO of Infinity Models, Jude, quickly moves Poppy into Harriet's place for the next event. Wilbur does his best to smooth things over with his coworkers, but eventually resigns from the agency in protest. Back at school, Harriet is again harassed and bullied by the bullies, but with support from Toby and Nat she finally stands up for herself. Thanks to the efforts of Nick and Wilbur, Yuji is convinced to rehire Harriet, who, with the full support of her friends and family now behind her, decides to give modeling another try. The show is a great success, despite some hiccups, and Harriet at last learns to be comfortable in herself as both a fashion model and a girl geek.

== Cast and characters ==
=== Main ===
- Emily Carey as Harriet Manners
- Emmanuel Imani as Wilbur Evans
- Liam Woodrum as Nick Park
- Tim Downie as Richard Manners
- Jemima Rooper as Annabel Manners
- James Murray as Mr Fiennes
- Sarah Parish as Jude Paignton
- Sandra Yi Sencindiver as Yuji Lee

=== Supporting ===
- Rochelle Harrington as Natalie Grey
- Zac Looker as Toby Pilgrim
- Daisy Jelley as Poppy Hepple-Cartwright
- Mia Jenkins as Lexi
- Hebe Beardsall as Betty
- Alana Boden as Miss Lord
- Hersha Verity as Maia Grey
- Matthew Jordan as Filip
- Stacey McKenzie as Serena Stone
- Herieth Paul as Fleur

=== Guest ===
- James Craven as Ollie
- Madeleine Price as Liv
- Zandra Rhodes as herself
- Pandemonia as herself
- Lola Clark as herself
- Daniel Lismore as himself
- Stephen Jones as himself
- Val Garland as herself
- Bimini Bon-Boulash as the Curator
- Alexandra Chaves as Millie
- Tika the Iggy as herself
- Alexander Lincoln as Marc
- Holly Smale as herself
- Leomie Anderson as Tuesday Bell

== Production ==
In January 2023, it was announced Netflix had picked up a ten-part adaptation of Holly Smale's Geek Girl from Corus Entertainment's Waterside Studios in association with Nelvana with Corus handling Canadian TV and streaming rights. The project would be a British-Canadian co-production made by RubyRock Pictures and Aircraft Pictures, with producers including Zoë Rocha of RubyRock and Anthony Leo and Andrew Rosen of Aircraft. It was confirmed Emily Carey would lead the series as Harriet Manners in June 2023, with Sarah Parish, Emmanuel Imani, Liam Woodrum, Zac Looker, Tim Downie, Jemima Rooper, Daisy Jelley, and Rochelle Harrington also joining the cast.

Principal photography began in early June 2023 in England before later moving to Canada. In July, filming took place in Ottawa. The Canadian capital was also the setting for the episodes that were filmed there. The show features pieces from John Rocha's past collections as well as designs by Simone Rocha.

On April 30, 2025, the series was renewed for a second season with Boat Rocker Media taking over production from Corus Entertainment. As part of the renewal, Boat Rocker acquired the distribution rights to season 1 from Corus.

== Episodes ==
No.	Title	Written by	Original release date
1	"Chapter 1"	Jessica Ruston & Holly Smale	May 30, 2024
2	"Chapter 2"	Sameera Steward	May 30, 2024
3	"Chapter 3"	Jessica Ruston & Holly Smale	May 30, 2024
4	"Chapter 4"	Sarah Morgan	May 30, 2024
5	"Chapter 5"	Jessica Ruston	May 30, 2024
6	"Chapter 6"	Jessica Ruston	May 30, 2024
7	"Chapter 7"	Sameera Steward	May 30, 2024
8	"Chapter 8"	Sarah Morgan & Zoë Rocha	May 30, 2024
9	"Chapter 9"	Jessica Ruston	May 30, 2024
10	"Chapter 10"	Jessica Ruston	May 30, 2024

== Release ==
All ten episodes of the first series were simultaneously released on Netflix internationally on May 30, 2024. The series also debuted in Canada on StackTV that same day.

== Reception ==
=== Audience viewership ===
Geek Girl debuted at number seven on Netflix's Global Top 10 TV English titles for the tracking week of 27 May–2 June 2024, with 18.9 million hours viewed. On the following week, it rose to number two, garnering 41 million viewing hours. Variety listed it as number three most-watched among streaming original television series for 31 May–6 June 2024, while Deadline Hollywood placed it in the second spot among television shows for the week of June 3, citing 7.3 million views. It remained among Netflix's global top 10 English TV series for four weeks.

=== Critical response ===
On Metacritic, the series has a weighted average score of 73 out of 100, based on four critics, indicating "generally favorable" reviews. The Rotten Tomatoes approval rating is 100% based on seven critic reviews. The Guardian's Lucy Mangan, who described herself as a fan of the novels, considered it a good adaptation and said it was "fresh, lively and funny". Radio Times gave the series three out of five stars, citing a "run-of-the-mill" format and some problems with suspension of disbelief; reviewer Tilly Pearce said the heart of the series lies in the characters' relationships, and also praised the soundtrack, in the end calling it "a feel-good, cosy watch" that should please book lovers.

Daniel Fienberg of The Hollywood Reporter said it was "a likably wholesome, generally low-stakes YA fairy tale" and especially enjoyed Carey's performance, though he pointed out some over-reliance on safe, familiar tropes and repetitive visuals. He said that Harriet Manners is clearly coded as neurodivergent, but that the show resists applying any such labels to her; the BBC review from Annabel Rackham noted that both Carey and Smale are autistic and called neurodivergent representation an "important aspect" of the show. Smale wrote, in response to critics calling the series' representation of autism "inauthentic", "It's based on books written by me (autistic), about me as a teen (autistic). I wrote all of Harriet for the show (still autistic) and the lead actor is autistic. It's the DEFINITION of authentic. I think people are so used to seeing inauthentic representation they don't recognise it when it's in front of them."

In its year-end review of Canadian television production for 2024, trade magazine Playback named it Scripted Series of the Year.
