= Lola Blue =

English actress (born 2005)

- Born: Lola-Blue Sattar; 2005 (age 20–21); Bristol, England
- Occupation: Actress
- Years active: 2020–present
- Mother: Zita Sattar

Lola-Blue Sattar (born 2005), known professionally as Lola Blue, is an English actress. She began her career making appearances in various British television series including The Worst Witch, The Dumping Ground and Doctors, after which she starred as Addie Darrow in the CBBC series A Kind of Spark from 2022 to 2023. Blue has also appeared in various stage productions, as well as appearing as Ellie Benton on the ITV1 soap opera Coronation Street in 2024.

== Early life ==
Lola-Blue Sattar was born in 2005 in Bristol. Her mother is actress Zita Sattar and her father is director Declan O'Dwyer. The family reside in Birmingham, where she attained a Level 3 Extended Diploma in acting at Birmingham Ormiston Academy. Blue is autistic.

== Career ==
Blue made her screen debut in an episode of the CBBC series The Worst Witch in 2020. That same year, she appeared in episodes of The Dumping Ground and Miss Scarlet and The Duke. Then in 2022, Blue appeared in an episode of the BBC soap opera Doctors. She portrayed Shona Greenhalgh, a fifteen-year-old who gives birth to a baby and abandons it at a local church. A year later, she was cast as Addie Darrow, the leading character in the CBBC series A Kind of Spark. An adaptation of the novel of the same name by Elle McNicoll, the series centred around Addie, an autistic girl who is navigating adolescence and living in a small town. The series aired from 2023 to 2024 and received critical acclaim for its portrayal of autistic women, with Blue nominated for a Children's and Family Emmy Award for Outstanding Lead Performer in 2024 for her role as Addie.

In 2024, Blue appeared as Ellie Benton on the ITV1 soap opera Coronation Street. Her character was involved in a high-profile storyline that saw her revealed as an abuse victim at the hands of series villain Joel Deering (Calum Lill). In 2026, she starred opposite Emily Carey in The Birth of a Mall Goth, a short film about autism.

== Filmography ==
Year	Title	Role	Notes
2020	The Worst Witch	Jessica Juniper	Episode: "The Crystal Lake"
2020	Miss Scarlet and The Duke	Young Eliza Scarlet	Episode: "Inheritance"
2020	The Dumping Ground	Zara	Episode: "Everybody Needs a Friend"
2022	Doctors	Shona Greenhalgh	Episode: "Doing Nothing"
2023–2024	A Kind of Spark	Addie Darrow	Main role
2024	Coronation Street	Ellie Benton	Recurring role
2025	Miles Away	Max	Short film
2026	A Mouth Full of Wires	Aira (voice)	Short film
2026	The Birth of a Mall Goth	Gemma	Short film

== Stage ==
- To Anyone Who Cares
- Richard II
- Lord of the Flies
- How to Raise
- The Glove Thief
- See Me
- Remember Remember

== Awards and nominations ==
Year	Organisation	Category	Nominated work	Result	Ref.
2023	RTS North West Awards	Best Performance in a Drama	A Kind of Spark	Nominated	
2024	Children's and Family Emmy Awards	Outstanding Lead Performer	A Kind of Spark	Nominated	
