= Jacob Moskovitz =

American actor

- Education: University of North Carolina School of the Arts
- Years active: 2020–present
- Television: Elle

Jacob Moskovitz is an American television and film actor. His television roles include Elle (2026).

== Biography ==
A graduate of the University of North Carolina School of the Arts, he was later based in New York. He had early television roles in The Good Fight for Paramount+, Magnum P.I. and Chicago P.D. for NBC, and FBI: International for CBS.

Moskovitz appeared in the A24 feature film Y2K, written and directed by Kyle Mooney and Evan Winter. He also appeared in Isle Child, written and directed by Thomas Percy Kim, and The Floaters, directed by Rachael Israel. He also had a film role in Brian which had its world premiere at the SXSW Festival in March 2026.

In 2026, Moskovitz could be seen portraying Miles opposite Lexi Minetree in Elle for Amazon Prime Video, a prequel series to Legally Blonde, and filmed a second season of the show that year.

Moskovitz has an upcoming role alongside Robert Pattinson in feature film Here Comes the Flood.

== Filmography ==
Key
†	Denotes works that have not yet been released

Year	Title	Role	Notes
2022	The Good Fight	Rory	Episode: "The End of a Saturday"
2022	FBI: International	Kody	Episode: "Call It Anarchy"
2023	Magnum P.I.	Travis	Episode: "Extracurricular Activities"
2024	Y2K	Trevor	
2025	Chicago P.D.	Nick Payton	Episode: "Transference"
2025	Isle Child	Carter	
2025	The Floaters	One-Nut	
2026	Brian	Teddy	
2026	Elle	Miles	8 episodes
TBA	Here Comes the Flood †	Stax Miller	

== Theatre ==
Years	Title	Role	Location / company
2026	Kowalski	Marlon Brando	Lookingglass Theatre Company, Chicago
