= Lizzie Huxley-Jones =

Welsh editor and author of children's literature

- Occupations: Editor, author
- Website: lizziehuxleyjones.com

Lizzie Huxley-Jones is a Welsh editor and author of children's literature. They are an advocate for the representation of disability in literature, and the author of the Welsh mythology-inspired Vivi Conway novels (2023–2024), among other works.

== Early life ==
Huxley-Jones grew up in Rhuddlan, North Wales. They attended a local Rhuddlan primary school and then went to secondary school in Abergele.

== Career ==
Before their writing career, Huxley-Jones worked in charities and as a bookseller. Through the latter job, they re-ignited a past interest in writing. Huxley-Jones was editorial and communications director of the indie publisher 3 of Cups Press, founded in 2017 with the intent to address "galling inequality".

In 2022, Hodder & Stoughton acquired the publishing rights to Huxley-Jones' holiday-themed romantic comedy novel Make You Mine This Christmas. Huxley-Jones intended to explore a romance between lead characters who are neurodivergent, queer, and disabled, and also reflect Huxley-Jones's own personal experiences.

Huxley-Jones' Welsh mythology-inspired middle grade novel, Vivi Conway and the Sword of Legend, was published by Knights Of in 2023. The novel garnered significant critical attention, appearing on the shortlists for the Waterstones Children's Book Prize in the Younger Readers category, the Adrien Prize (for children's stories with a disabled main characters), and the English-language Tir na n-Og Award for children's literature from Wales. The novel was also on the longlist for the Branford Boase Award. Love Island star Tasha Ghouri and Huxley-Jones announced in 2023 that they were writing a young adult romance novel, Hits Different, in which a deaf woman pursues her dream of becoming a dancer. Hot Key Books later acquired the rights to the novel, which was released the following year.

In addition to their literary work, Huxley-Jones has worked as a sensitivity reader and spoken in the press about the representation of disability in literature.

== Personal life ==
Huxley-Jones is non-binary. They grew up while Section 28 forbade "promotion of homosexuality" in schools of the United Kingdom, with the law having been repealed when they were 14 years old. As of result, they have been passionate about including queer characters in their work. They have Ehlers–Danlos syndrome (EDS) and have spoken about the representation of characters with disabilities, such as EDS, in literature.

After being diagnosed with autism, Huxley-Jones' research into the diagnosis led them to discover "big gaps" in autism representation within some genres of literature.

== Bibliography ==
=== Non-fiction ===
- Huxley-Jones, Lizzie (2020). Sir David Attenborough: A Life Story. Scholastic.
- — (2020). Stim: An Autistic Anthology. Unbound.
- — (2021). "Dismantling Judgment". In Bourne, Shakirah; Levy, Dana Alison (eds.). Allies: Real Talk about Showing Up, Screwing Up and Trying Again. Dorling Kindersley.

=== Fiction ===
- — (2023). Make You Mine This Christmas. Hodder & Stoughton.
- — (2023). Vivi Conway and the Sword of Legend. Knights Of.
- — (2024). Vivi Conway and the Haunted Quest. Knights Of.
- Ghouri, Tasha; Huxley-Jones, Lizzie (2024). Hits Different. Hot Key Books.
