= According to Bex =

- Genre: Sitcom
- Created by: Fred Barron
- Starring: Jessica Hynes; Greg Wise; Raquel Cassidy; Clive Russell; Zita Sattar; Oliver Chris
- Country of origin: United Kingdom
- Original language: English
- No. of series: 1
- No. of episodes: 8

Production
- Executive producers: Fred Barron; Sophie Clarke-Jervoise
- Producers: Alex Walsh-Taylor; Kenton Allen
- Running time: 30 minutes

Original release
- Network: BBC One
- Release: 7 January – 25 February 2005

According to Bex (originally titled Everything I Know About Men) is a British sitcom that aired on BBC One in 2005. Starring Jessica Stevenson (now known as Jessica Hynes), it was written by Katie Douglas, Julia Barron and Fred Barron, who also created My Family and After You've Gone. The American sitcom Courting Alex, starring Jenna Elfman, was originally based on According to Bex.

== Cast ==
- Jessica Hynes – Bex Atwell
- Greg Wise – Charles Mathers
- Raquel Cassidy – Chris
- Clive Russell – Jack Atwell
- Zita Sattar – Jan
- Oliver Chris – Ryan

== Plot ==
According to Bex concerns the life of Bex Atwell, a twenty-something single woman who works as a secretary and lives in London. She is looking for the perfect man and the perfect job, but in both she ends with second best.

== Reception ==
Critical reception to the show was negative, with The Stage calling it "the biggest sitcom disaster of the year". and the British Comedy Guide describing it as "dull and predictable". Despite reports that a second series had been planned, the show was cancelled after the first series due to low ratings. Hynes considered the series so bad that she ended up firing her agent.

== Episodes ==
1. "Stuck in the Middle With You" (7 January 2005)
2. "Papa's Got a Brand New Bag" (14 January 2005)
3. "The Time Warp" (21 January 2005)
4. "Breaking Up Is Hard To Do" (28 January 2005)
5. "Gimme Shelter" (4 February 2005)
6. "Private Dancer" (11 February 2005)
7. "Hanging on the Telephone" (18 February 2005)
8. "Nothing But Flowers" (25 February 2005)
