= Sharna Jackson =

British author

Sharna Jackson is a British writer of children's fiction. She is the author of a mystery series, aimed at middle-grade readers, featuring Nik and Norva, a pair of black sisters, who solve crimes on an estate, the Tri Estate, in South London. Jackson is also an influential curator in the arts, including working with Tate, Victoria and Albert Museum and Design museum in London, and working as artistic director for Site Gallery in Sheffield from July 2018 to November 2020, engaging children in developing digital initiatives in the arts.

== Life ==
Jackson grew up in Luton. Before writing children's books she worked as a curator engaging children in the arts.

The first book in Jackson's series, High-Rise Mystery, has Nik and Norva solve a murder in their tower block during the hottest summer on record. High-Rise Mystery was shortlisted for the Waterstones Children's Book Prize in 2020. In the second novel in the series, Mic Drop, Nik and Norva investigate the death of an up-and-coming pop star TrojKat, who has fallen from the tower roof.

== Works ==
- (with James Lambert) Modern art: activity book. London: Tate Publishing, 2014.
- (with James Lambert) British art: activity book. London: Tate Publishing, 2014.
- High-Rise Mystery. London: Knights Of, 2019.
- Mic Drop. London: Knights Of, 2020.
