= Zita Sattar =

English actress (born 1975)

- Born: 1975 (age 50–51); Birmingham, England
- Education: Rose Bruford College
- Occupation: Actress
- Years active: 1987–present
- Known for: Casualty
- Children: Lola Blue

Zita Sattar (born 1975) is an English television, theatre, and film actress from Birmingham.

== Early life ==
Sattar is of mixed descent, her mother being British and her father Pakistani. At the age of eleven, as a young amateur actress, Sattar was one of the founding members of Birmingham's Central Junior Television Workshop. She then attended the Rose Bruford College of Theatre & Performance in London.

== Career ==
Sattar is best known for playing Anna Paul in Casualty from 2001 to 2003. She has also had roles in The Bill, Gimme Gimme Gimme, According to Bex, Dalziel and Pascoe, Doctors, and Flowers.

Her theatre roles include: Top Girls, Clubbed Out, Let's Go to the Fair, Hansel and Gretel, One Night, D'yer Eat with your Fingers, and Romeo and Juliet. She also played the role of Meenah Khan in the original cast of East is East by Ayub Khan-Din. It was produced by the Tamasha Theatre Company at the Royal Court Theatre, London, in 1996. Although she did not reprise the role in the film version of the play (1999), she did appear as new character Neelam Haqq in the sequel West Is West (2010). She has starred in the following low-budget films: The Final Curtain, Esther Kahn, Janice Beard 45wpm, and Large.

== Personal life ==
As of 2007, Sattar's partner was director Declan O'Dwyer, with whom she has one daughter, actress Lola Blue.

== Filmography ==
=== Film ===
List of film appearances, with year, title, and role shown
Year	Title	Role	Notes
1999	Janice Beard	Jane	
2001	Esther Kahn	assistant make-up girl	
2001	Large	Kylie	
2002	The Final Curtain	Sylvia (contestant)	
2006	Almost Adult	Malaeka	
2009	Mad, Sad & Bad	Kirty	
2010	West Is West	Neelam Haqq	
2013	Another Me	Mira	

=== Television ===
List of television appearances, with year, title, and role shown
Year	Title	Role	Notes
1987	Y.E.S.	Nazreen	2 episodes
1995	The Bill	W.D.C. Watson	1 episode
1996	The Bill: Target	W.D.C. Watson	feature-length episode
1997	Backup	Meera	1 episode
1997–1998	Hale and Pace	—	3 episodes
1998	Drop the Dead Donkey	receptionist	1 episode
1998	Heartburn Hotel	Debbie	7 episodes
1999	Gimme Gimme Gimme	Sultana	1 episode
2002	Holby City	Anna Paul	1 episode
2001–2003	Casualty	Anna Paul	83 episodes
2005	According to Bex	Jan	8 episodes
2006	Dalziel and Pascoe	Louise Hepburn	2 episodes
2009	Doctors	Sammi Miah	2 episodes
2010	The Bill	Nancy Faber	1 episode
2012	Prisoners' Wives	Natalie	1 episode
2012	Love Life	Carmel	1 episode
2014	Derek	Cath	1 episode (credited as Zita Sitar)
2015	Call the Midwife	Josie Smith	1 episode
2015	Mount Pleasant	Amita	8 episodes
2016	Flowers	Barbara	3 episodes
2016	Doctors	Kate Riley	1 episode
2017	The Rebel	matron	1 episode
2017	Creeped Out	Hannah	1 episode
2017–2020	The Worst Witch	Miss Tapioca	15 episodes
2019	Vera	Laura Harper	1 episode
2019	Years and Years	Yvonne Bukhari	3 episodes
2020	Coronation Street	Dr Ward	8 episodes
2021–2023	The Cleaner	Ruth	4 episodes
2022	Father Brown	Mavis Jug	1 episode
2022	Doctors	Ren Mackintosh	1 episode
