= Thomas Barbusca =

American actor (born 2003)

- Born: March 3, 2003 (age 23); New Jersey, U.S.
- Occupation: Actor
- Years active: 2012–present
- Known for: The Mick

Thomas Barbusca (born March 3, 2003) is an American actor. He is known for portraying Chip Pemberton, one of the three kids on the television sitcom The Mick. He also starred in the film Middle School: The Worst Years of My Life and plays Drew, the camp bully kid in the Netflix television series Wet Hot American Summer: First Day of Camp. He also had a role in the fifth season of American Horror Story.

== Personal life ==
He has an older sister named Brielle who is also an actress. He currently lives in Los Angeles, California. He was born in New Jersey. He is of Italian descent.

== Career ==
In 2016, Barbusca was cast to co-star as Chip Pemberton on The Mick. He also starred in the film Middle School: The Worst Years of My Life as Leo based on the 2011 novel of the same name by James Patterson and Chris Tebbetts.

== Filmography ==
=== Film ===
Year	Title	Role	Notes
2012	Microeconomics	Cody	Short film
2014	The Last Time You Had Time	Duncan	
2015	Summer Memories	Jason (voice)	Short film
2015	Tag	Playground boy	
2016	Middle School: The Worst Years of My Life	Leo	
2018	Searching	Cody (YouCast)	
2019	Big Time Adolescence	Will Stacey	
2021	North Hollywood	Alter Boy	
2021	Ron's Gone Wrong	Jayden (voice)	
2022	Luckiest Girl Alive	Arthur Finneman	
2023	Missing	Cody	
2024	The Real Bros of Simi Valley: High School Reunion	Carter	
2024	Incoming	Ruby	
2026	Brian	TBA	

=== Television ===
Year	Title	Role	Notes
2012	Conan	Peanuts Halloween Skit Linus	Episode: "Where There's Smoke, There's Gladys the Smoker"
2012–13	The New Normal	Donny	2 episodes ("The XY Factor", "About a Boy Scout")
2012–13	New Girl	Glenn Ely	Episode: "Winston's Birthday"
2013	Body of Proof	Young Kid	Episode: "Abduction, Part II"
2013	Sam & Cat	Billy	Episode: "#PeezyB"
2014	Grey's Anatomy	Link McNeil	Season 10 recurring role, 5 episodes
2014	Clarence	Malakevin	Episode: "Dollar Hunt" (voice role)
2014	Anger Management	Justin	Notes Episode: "Charlie Gets Trashed"
2015	Shameless	Remedial Kid	Episode: "Tell Me You F**King Need Me"
2015	The Thundermans	Cedric (Electress Fan)	Episode: "Who's Your Mommy?"
2015	The League	Cooper Harris (The Bully)	Episode: "The Bully"
2015	Wet Hot American Summer: First Day of Camp	Drew	Regular role, 7 episodes
2015	American Horror Story: Hotel	Jimmy	3 episodes
2016	Preacher	Chris Schenck	Episodes: "Pilot" and "The Possibilities"
2017	Ryan Hansen Solves Crimes on Television	Jonathan Sneakz	Episode: "Joel McHale Is: Ryan Hansen"
2017	One Day at a Time	Finn Maxwell	Episodes: "Pride & Prejudice" and "Hold, Please"
2017–18	The Mick	Chip Pemberton	Main role
2018–19	The Kids Are Alright	Davey	Episodes: "Microwave", "The Love List", "San Valentin"
2018	Champaign ILL	Cade	Episode: "Supreme Brick"
2019	Arrested Development	Young Gob Bluth	Episodes: "The Untethered Sole", "Saving for Arraignment Day", "Courting Disasters"
2019–20	Schooled	Alex Piper	Recurring role, 5 episodes
2020	The Real Bros of Simi Valley	Carter	4 episodes
2020	Solar Opposites	Aeden	2 episodes (voice role)
2021	Chad	Reid	Recurring role
2021	Black Monday	Werner	Recurring role
2025	The Studio	Doug	Recurring role
