= Brian (film) =

- Directed by: Will Ropp
- Written by: Mike Scollins
- Produced by: Thomas Mahoney; Casey Hanley; Will Ropp
- Starring: Ben Wang; William H. Macy; Edi Patterson; Randall Park; Natalie Morales; Joshua Colley; Peyton Elizabeth Lee; Thomas Barbusca
- Cinematography: Matthew Pothier
- Edited by: Anisha Acharya
- Music by: Clyde Lawrence; Cody Fitzgerald
- Production companies: Handsome Watson; Act 4 Artists; Endless Ropportunities
- Distributed by: Greenwich Entertainment
- Release date: March 14, 2026 (SXSW)
- Running time: 94 minutes
- Country: United States
- Language: English

Brian is a 2026 American coming-of-age comedy film directed by Will Ropp and written by Mike Scollins. It stars Ben Wang, William H. Macy, Edi Patterson, Randall Park, Natalie Morales, Joshua Colley, Peyton Elizabeth Lee, and Thomas Barbusca.

== Premise ==
An acerbic high-school student runs for class president in an attempt to get closer to his teacher.

== Cast ==
- Ben Wang as Brian
- William H. Macy
- Edi Patterson
- Randall Park
- Natalie Morales
- Joshua Colley
- Peyton Elizabeth Lee
- Thomas Barbusca
- Jacob Moskovitz
- Mackenna Shults

== Production ==
Principal photography wrapped in May 2025, in Oklahoma, for a coming-of-age comedy film by actor Will Ropp who made his feature film directorial debut, and Mike Scollins writing the script. Ben Wang was cast in the lead role as the titular character, alongside William H. Macy, Edi Patterson, and Randall Park. In June, Natalie Morales, Joshua Colley, Peyton Elizabeth Lee, Thomas Barbusca, and Jacob Moskovitz were revealed to have joined the cast.

== Release ==
Brian had its world premiere at the SXSW on March 14, 2026. In November 2026, Greenwich Entertainment acquired the film and is set to be released in 2027.

== Critical reception ==
On the review aggregator website Rotten Tomatoes, 100% of 14 critics' reviews are positive, with an average rating of 8.00/10. Metacritic, which uses a weighted average, assigned the film a score of 81 out of 100, based on 5 critics, indicating "universal acclaim".
