= Elle McNicoll =

Scottish children's writer

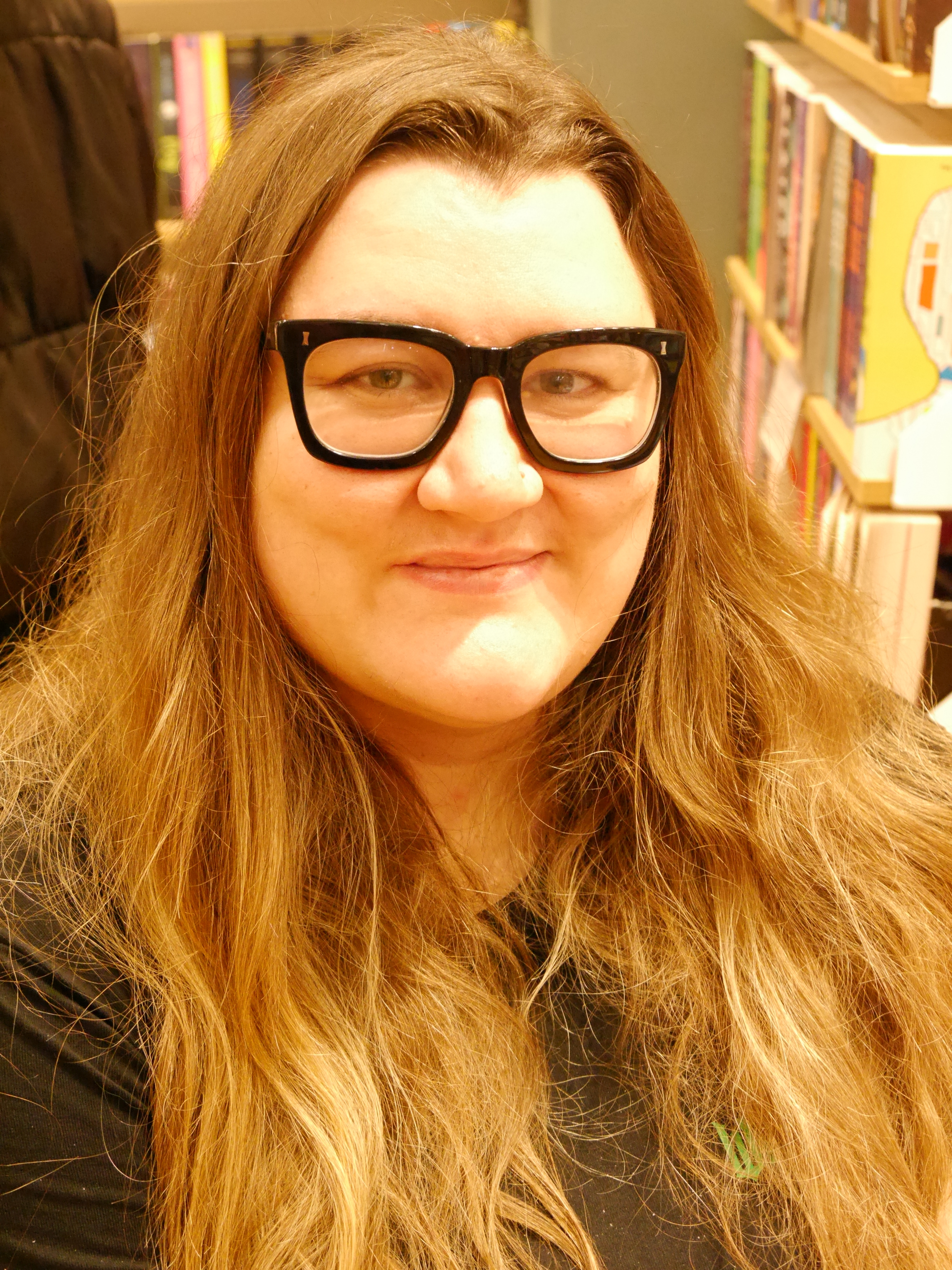
- McNicoll, in Waterstones, Kensington, 2024
- Born: Elle McNicoll; 5 October 1992 (age 34); Edinburgh, Scotland
- Education: University College London
- Occupations: Children's author; screenwriter
- Writing career
- Language: English
- Years active: 2020–present
- Notable works: A Kind of Spark; Show Us Who You Are
- Notable awards: 2021 Waterstones Children's Book Prize 2021 Blue Peter Book Award

Elle McNicoll (born 5 October 1992) is a Scottish children's literature writer. The Guardian described her as a "talent in children's books [who] will inspire readers young and old for generations to come".

== Biography ==
McNicoll's debut novel, A Kind of Spark (2020), follows the efforts of an autistic eleven-year-old girl, Addie, to establish a memorial to the witch trials in her Scottish hometown. McNicoll is autistic herself. The book was children's book of the week in The Times and The Sunday Times, and won both the Overall and Younger Fiction prizes at the 2021 Waterstones Children's Book Prize. It also won the Blue Peter Book Award for Best Story, voted for by children. McNicoll was nominated for the Branford Boase Award and the Carnegie Medal. A Kind of Spark was named Overall Book of the Year by Blackwell's. McNicoll was awarded an honour by the Schneider Family Book Award in 2022 for the US edition of A Kind of Spark. It was listed as number 75 of the 100 greatest children's books of all time by the BBC.

Her second novel, Show Us Who You Are, was published in March 2021, and was Children's Book of the Week in The Times. It was also named the Children's Book of the Month by Blackwell's. It was nominated for Best Children's Fiction in the 2021 Books Are My Bag Readers' Awards, and McNicoll was also nominated for Best Breakthrough Author.

Her third novel, Like a Charm, was published in February 2022 by Knights Of and was also Children's Book of the Week in The Times, as well as being reviewed as "another fiercely gripping, superbly original story" by The Guardian. In 2022 McNicoll also wrote a story as part of the crime anthology The Very Merry Murder Club edited by Serena Patel and Robin Stevens.

A Kind of Spark was adapted into a television series from CBBC and BYUtv, with McNicoll acting as co-lead writer on the programme. It premiered on BBC iPlayer in the UK on 31 March 2023. In 2023, Macmillan won a five-publisher auction for the rights to two of McNicoll's young adult novels, Some Like it Cold (2024) and Wish You Were Her (2025).

McNicoll wrote and recorded an essay for BBC Radio 3's The Essay. The subject was Nora Ephron.

Keedie, the prequel to A Kind of Spark, was published in 2024. In an episode of In the Reading Corner, McNicoll talked about her exploration of teenage bullying and the stereotyping of neurodivergent characters.

== Personal life ==
McNicoll was born and raised in Scotland and currently lives in London. She earned a master's degree in publishing from University College London in 2019, with her dissertation being on why children’s publishing needs more neurodiversity.

== Advocacy ==
McNicoll has been an outspoken advocate for better representations of neurodiversity in publishing. She has been credited with kickstarting a revolution in publishers' attitudes to neurodiverse characters. In 2022, McNicoll established The Adrien Prize, a prize for traditionally published children's books with a disabled lead character. The longlist for The Adrien Prize 2022 was announced on Twitter and included The Night the Moon Went Out by Samantha Baines, The Secret of Haven Point by Lisette Auton, A Flash of Fireflies by Aisha Bushby, Wilder Than Midnight by Cerrie Burnell, The Great Fox Illusion by Justyn Edwards and The Extraordinary Adventures of Alice Tonks by Emily Kenny.

== Works ==
=== Novels ===
- —— (2020). A Kind of Spark. London: Knights Of.
- —— (2021). Show Us Who You Are. London: Knights Of.
- —— (2022). Like a Charm. London: Knights Of.
- —— (2023). Like a Curse. London: Knights Of.
- —— (2024). Keedie. Knights Of.
- —— (2024). Some Like It Cold. Wednesday Books.
- —— (2025). Wish You Were Her. First Ink.
- —— (2025). Role Model. Knights Of.
- —— (2026). Unapologetic Love Story. Macmillan.
- —— (2026). Yearning Difficulties. Macmillan.

=== Scripts ===
- A Kind of Spark, television series created by Anna McCleery (2023—2024).

=== Short stories ===
- —— (2024). Matilda and the Naughty List, Charlie and the Christmas Factory. Puffin Books.
