= Emily Carey =

English actor (born 2003)

- Born: Emily Joanna Carey; 30 April 2003 (age 23); Barnet, Greater London, England
- Education: Claremont School, East Sussex
- Occupation: Actor
- Years active: 2012–present

Emily Joanna Carey (born 30 April 2003) is an English actor. They (Note: Carey is non-binary and uses they/them pronouns.) began their career as a child performer on stage and in the BBC medical drama series Casualty (2014–2017, 2021). They went on to play several young versions of characters, such as Diana Prince in Wonder Woman (2017) and Lara Croft in Tomb Raider (2018). Carey is best known for playing young Alicent Hightower in the HBO fantasy series House of the Dragon (2022) and Harriet Manners in the Netflix teen drama series Geek Girl (2024).

== Early life ==
Emily Joanna Carey was born on 30 April 2003 in the London Borough of Barnet and grew up in East Sussex. They were raised by their mother, Sarah MacDonnell, a talent agent and former actor.

Carey was educated at the independent co-educational Claremont School until the age of 14. They have said that, while their acting career was one factor in the decision, they left school mainly for mental health reasons.

From early childhood, Carey was regularly backstage in theatres with family members who worked in the industry, including their grandmother, a former West End wardrobe supervisor. Carey has said that growing up around theatre gave them an early familiarity with performance and helped make acting feel like a natural path, and one that "I've wanted to do forever".

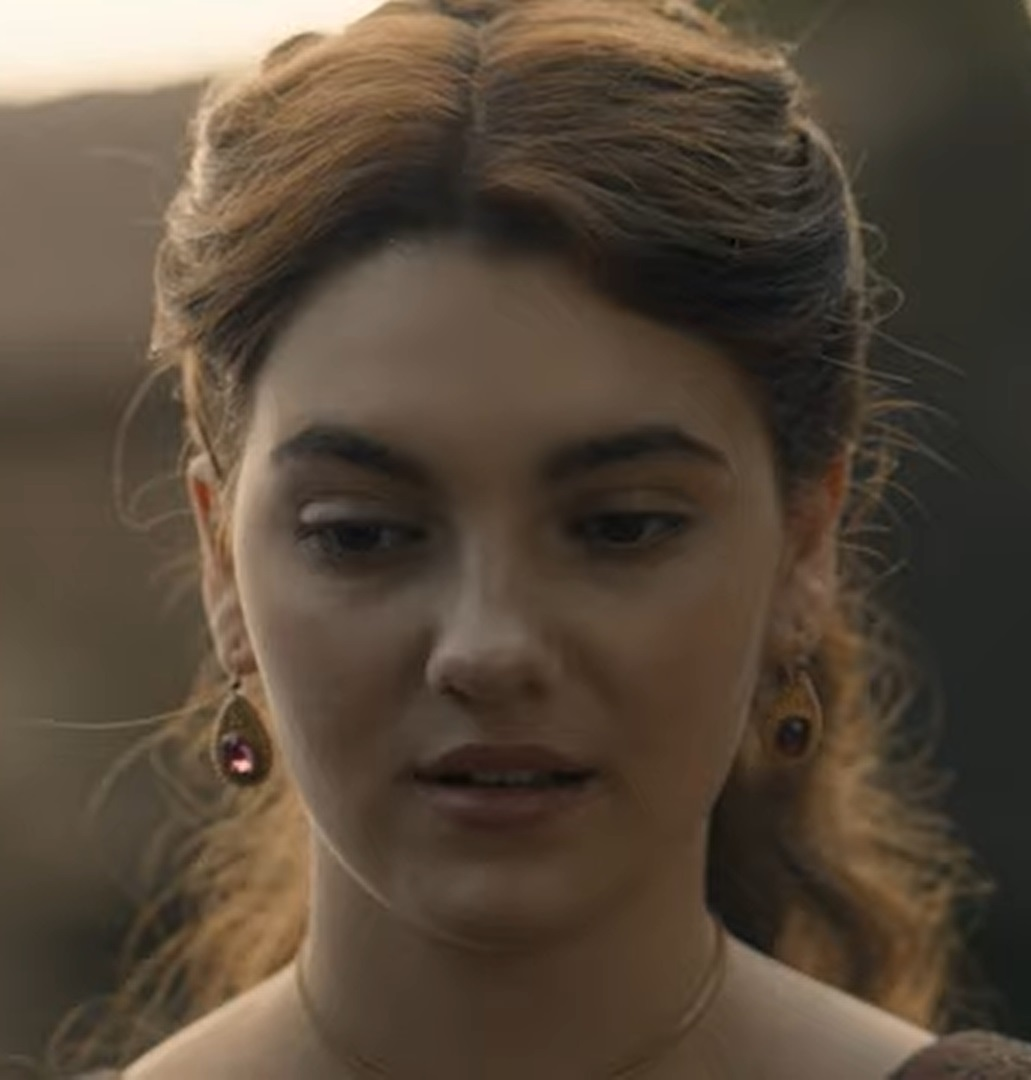
Emily Carey as Alicent Hightower in House of the Dragon

== Career ==
Carey began their professional career in 2012, making their West End debut aged nine in Shrek the Musical at the Theatre Royal, Drury Lane. The following year, they appeared as Marta von Trapp in The Sound of Music at Regent's Park Open Air Theatre.

In 2014, Carey joined the cast of the BBC medical drama Casualty as Grace Beauchamp, appearing regularly until 2017 and reprising the role in 2021. Their storylines included a long‑running brain injury recovery arc, for which they undertook research with The Children's Trust to support an accurate portrayal. During this period, they also appeared as Mary Conan Doyle in the ITV series Houdini & Doyle. In 2016, the The Huffington Post named Carey as one of the year's top child actors.

Carey made their feature film debut as the young Diana Prince in the DC Universe film Wonder Woman (2017), studying Gal Gadot's speech patterns to match the character's voice. The film received a positive critical response and was a commercial success. They subsequently portrayed a young Lara Croft in Tomb Raider (2018).

Carey secured their first leading television role in the BBC and Netflix teen drama Get Even (2020), playing schoolgirl Mika Cavanaugh, whose private photos are shared without her consent, leading to bullying and social isolation. That year, they also appeared in the title role of the film Anastasia: Once Upon a Time (2020). In 2021, Carey transitioned into voice work in feature animation, voicing Anne Frank in Ari Folman's Where Is Anne Frank (2021), and Mila in Monster Family 2 (2021).

Carey had a career breakthrough with their role as young Alicent Hightower in the HBO Game of Thrones prequel series House of the Dragon (2022), adapted from George R. R. Martin's historical fantasy book Fire & Blood. Carey's performance received praise from critics. Megan O'Keefe of Decider described it as “carefully composed”, while Kaiya Shunyata of Roger Ebert called Carey's performance “fantastic”.

Carey next starred as Harriet Manners in the Netflix teen drama Geek Girl (2024), based on Holly Smale's novel of the same name. Carey described the role as personally significant, saying it was both truthful and “healing to their inner child” in light of their own experiences as an autistic person. The series and Carey's performance were praised. Lucy Mangan in The Guardian felt that they delivered a complete performance, while Hollywood Repoter's Daniel Fienburg wrote that Carey shined with a satisfying and believable portrayal.

Carey will next return as Harriet Manners in the second series of Geek Girl. Carey is also due to appear in the films Becoming Capa and Oddly Flowers, and as Victoria Chase in the television adaptation of the video game Life Is Strange.

== Personal life ==
Carey is autistic. They are queer and use they/them pronouns. They helped The Children's Trust launch the #MyBrave campaign.

Carey was in a relationship with musician Kellimarie Willis, who performs in the band RLY. In 2024, Carey was in a relationship with English actress Jessica Revell. However, in June 2026, they revealed in an interview that they are single.

== Filmography ==
=== Film ===
Year	Title	Role	Ref.
2017	Wonder Woman	Young Diana Prince	
2018	Tomb Raider	Young Lara Croft	
2020	Anastasia: Once Upon a Time	Anastasia	
2021	Where Is Anne Frank	Anne Frank (voice)	
2021	Monster Family 2	Mila Starr (voice)	
2022	The Lost Girls	Teen Wendy Darling	
2023	The Canterville Ghost	Virginia Otis (voice)	
2023	Breaking Point	Abbie	
2025	The Witcher: Sirens of the Deep	Sh'eenaz (voice)	
2025	Misper	Elle Pritchard	
2025	The Birth of a Mall Goth	May	
2025	A Witness	Miss Witmer	
TBA	Oddly Flowers	Audrey Flowers	
TBA	Becoming Capa	TBA	
TBA	Stray	Jenny	
TBA	Camino	Ellie	

=== Television ===
Year	Title	Role	Notes	Ref.
2014–2017, 2021	Casualty	Grace Beauchamp	Recurring role	
2016	Houdini & Doyle	Mary Conan Doyle	6 episodes	
2019	Turn Up Charlie	Bea	1 episode	
2020	Get Even	Mika Cavanaugh	Main role	
2022	House of the Dragon	Young Alicent Hightower	Main role; 5 episodes	
2024	Platform 7	Ella		
2024	Geek Girl	Harriet Manners	Main role	
2026	Dragon Striker	TBA		
TBA	Lady Charon	Natalie		
TBA	Life Is Strange	Victoria Chase	Main role	

=== Music videos ===
Year	Title	Artist	Ref.
2014	Baby, It's Cold Outside	Idina Menzel and Michael Bublé	
2022	Teenage Drama	Michael Aldag	
2024	Bitch Get Out of My Car	Say Now	

=== Stage ===
Year	Title	Role	Notes	Ref.
2012–13	Shrek The Musical	Young Shrek, Young Fiona, Grumpy	Theatre Royal, Drury Lane	
2013	The Sound of Music	Marta Von Trapp	Regent's Park Open Air Theatre	
2025	Before This New Year	Haley	The Duke on 42nd Street	

=== Video games ===
Year	Title	Role	Ref.
2022	Xenoblade Chronicles 3	Young Eunie	
2025	Final Fantasy Tactics: The Ivalice Chronicles	Alma Beoulve	

== Awards and nominations ==
Year	Award	Category	Nominated work	Result	Ref.
2022	Pena de Prata	Best Ensemble in a Drama Series	House of the Dragon	Nominated	
