= A Kind of Spark (TV series) =

2023 television series

- Genre: Children's television series
- Created by: Anna McCleery
- Based on: A Kind of Spark by Elle McNicoll
- Starring: Lola Blue; Georgia De Gidlow; Caitlin Hamilton; Eve Midgley; Hattie Gotobed
- Composer: Jessica Dannheisser
- Countries of origin: United Kingdom; Canada; Ireland (season 2)
- Original language: English
- No. of series: 2
- No. of episodes: 20

Production
- Executive producers: Anna McCleery; Grainne McNamara; Vince Commisso; Andra Johnson Duke; Jeff Simpson; Angus Fletcher; Kim Powers
- Producers: Luke Johnson; Wendy Thomas; Louise Cornally; Natalie Osborne; Alix Wiseman; Paul Munn (season 1); Morgan Bushe (season 2)
- Running time: 25 minutes
- Production companies: 9 Story Media Group; LS Productions; Brown Bag Films (season 2)

Original release
- Network: CBBC (United Kingdom); BYU TV (United States)
- Release: 31 March 2023 – 26 April 2024

A Kind of Spark is a British-Canadian-Irish children's television series created by Anna McCleery, based on the novel by Elle McNicoll. It is produced by the Canada-based 9 Story Media Group, Scotland-based LS Productions and BYU TV for the CBBC. The series follows Addie, a young autistic girl who wants a memorial in her village for the women who were accused of witchcraft and persecuted there.

It first premiered on 31 March 2023 on BBC iPlayer in the United Kingdom, followed by a network premiere on CBBC and BYU TV. It has also been distributed for streaming on ABC iview (Australia), CBC Gem (Canada), France Télévisions (France), NPO Start (Netherlands), TRTE (Ireland), NRK (Norway), SVT (Sweden), TVNZ+ (New Zealand).

In October 2023, it was announced that the series has been commissioned for a second season. On World Autism Awareness Day 2024, it was confirmed that the 2nd season would premiere on 26 April 2024 in the United Kingdom, and 28 April 2024 in the United States.

== Cast ==
- Lola Blue as Adeline "Addie" Darrow
- Georgia de Gidlow as Keedie Darrow
- Caitlin Hamilton as Nina Darrow
- Eve Midgley as Audrey Gladstone
- Evie Elgie as Jenna
- Grace Wood as Emily Parks
- Daisy Whitehead as Heather
- Zac Looker as Frank
- Hattie Gotobed as Margaret "Maggie" Fraser (season 1)
- Ella Maisy Purvis as Elinor Fraser (season 1) / Bonnie Bridges (season 2)
- Emma Tracey as Beth (season 1)
- Emily Matsa as Sarah (season 1)
- Bridget Marumo as Robin (season 1) / Dorothy Dangerfield (season 2)
- Forrest Bothwell as Jude (season 2)
- Conor Cupples as Finn (season 2)
- Zahra Browne as Bess Darrow
- Geoffrey Austin Newland as James Darrow
- Natasha Alderslade as Martha Bridges (season 2)
- Andrew Steele as Tom Bridges (season 2)
- Rosalyn Wright as Iona Gladstone
- Julia Haworth as Pamela Parks
- Kate Layden (season 1) / Carol Moore (season 2) as Miriam Jensen
- Sandra Cole as Mrs. Ross
- Andrew Readman as Mr. Laird
- John Draycott as Mr. MacIntosh
- Amy Marston as Miss Murphy (season 1)
- James McClelland as Mr Allison (season 1)
- Ben Willbond as Adam Quinn (season 1)
- Simon Pickering as Garreth (season 1)

== Production ==
Series 1 was filmed in Knutsford, Cheshire. Series 2 was filmed in Northern Ireland. The series features several actors who are neurodivergent, as is also the case for a large portion of the production team.

== Episodes ==
=== Series 1 (2023) ===
No.	Title	Directed by	Written by	Original release date
1	"The Spark"	Marek Losey	Anna McCleery and Elle McNicoll	31 March 2023
2	"Juniper"	Marek Losey	Elle McNicoll	31 March 2023
3	"The Witch List"	Marek Losey	Anna McCleery	31 March 2023
4	"Sisters"	Marek Losey	Vicki Lutas	31 March 2023
5	"Party"	Marek Losey	Anna McCleery and Vicki Lutas	31 March 2023
6	"Nicest Village"	Matt Holt	Anna McCleery	31 March 2023
7	"Sleepover"	Matt Holt	Karissa Hamilton-Bannis	31 March 2023
8	"Something Wicked"	Matt Holt	Vicki Lutas	31 March 2023
9	"Burnout"	Matt Holt	Elle McNicoll	31 March 2023
10	"The Way I Am"	Matt Holt	Anna McCleery and Elle McNicoll	31 March 2023

=== Series 2 (2024) ===
No.	Title	Directed by	Written by	Original release date
1	"What Next?"	Marek Losey	Anna McCleery and Elle McNicoll	26 April 2024
2	"Bonnie"	Marek Losey	Elle McNicoll	26 April 2024
3	"Le Tour de Frank"	Marek Losey	Anna McCleery	26 April 2024
4	"Shark Day"	Marek Losey	Vicki Lutas	26 April 2024
5	"Choices"	Marek Losey	Vicki Lutas and Anna McCleery	26 April 2024
6	"The Codebreakers"	Matt Holt	Scott Payne	26 April 2024
7	"Miriam"	Matt Holt	Karissa Hamilton-Bannis	26 April 2024
8	"Juniper at War"	Matt Holt	Anna McCleery	26 April 2024
9	"Runaway"	Matt Holt	Elle McNicoll	26 April 2024
10	"Safe"	Matt Holt	Anna McCleery and Elle McNicoll	26 April 2024

== Reception ==
The series has received critical acclaim. In an article for The Guardian, disability activist and writer Cathy Reay praised the production's commitment to platforming disabled talent in a children's series. Digital Spy's Rachel Charlton-Dailey also praised the series' representation of autistic women.

=== Awards and nominations ===
Year	Award	Category	Nominee(s)	Result
2024	Children's and Family Emmy Awards	Lead Performer in a Preschool, Children's or Young Teen Program	Lola Blue as Addie Darrow	Nominated
2024	Royal Television Awards NI	Best Children's or Animation Series	"A Kind of Spark"	Won
2023	Rose D'Or	Best Children's Program	"A Kind of Spark"	Nominated
2023	Children's and Family Emmy Awards	Outstanding Casting for a Children's or Family Viewing Series	"A Kind of Spark"	Nominated
2023	Royal Television Awards	Best Children's or Animation Series	"A Kind of Spark"	Won
2023	Broadcast Awards	Best Children's Series	"A Kind of Spark"	Won
