= The Mick (TV series) =

American television sitcom (2017–2018)

- Genre: Sitcom
- Created by: Dave Chernin; John Chernin
- Starring: Kaitlin Olson; Sofia Black-D'Elia; Carla Jimenez; Thomas Barbusca; Jack Stanton; Scott MacArthur
- Composer: Jonathan Sadoff
- Country of origin: United States
- Original language: English
- No. of seasons: 2
- No. of episodes: 37

Production
- Executive producers: Kaitlin Olson; John Chernin; Dave Chernin; Nicholas Frenkel; Oly Obst; Randall Einhorn
- Producers: Susan McConnell (pilot only); Christen Nangle; Caroline James
- Cinematography: Craig Kief
- Editor: Bruce Green
- Camera setup: Single-camera
- Running time: 22 minutes
- Production companies: BingBangBoom Productions; 3 Arts Entertainment; 20th Century Fox Television

Original release
- Network: Fox
- Release: January 1, 2017 – April 3, 2018

The Mick is an American television sitcom broadcast on Fox. Created by Dave Chernin and John Chernin, the series stars Kaitlin Olson, who also served as an executive producer. The series premiered on January 1, 2017, and assumed its regular Tuesday night slot on January 3, 2017. On January 11, 2017, Fox picked up the series for a full season of 17 episodes.

On February 21, 2017, Fox renewed the series for a 13-episode second season, which premiered on September 26, 2017, preceded by reruns of the first season on sister network FXX. On November 7, 2017, Fox ordered seven additional episodes, bringing the second season total to 20. On May 10, 2018, Fox cancelled the series after two seasons.

== Plot ==
Mackenzie "Mickey" Molng, a tough, foul-mouthed con woman from a tough part of Rhode Island, finds herself in a complicated guardianship as she's stuck raising her high maintenance niece and nephews after her sister and her sister's husband go on the run for fraud and racketeering.

== Cast and characters ==
=== Main ===
- Kaitlin Olson as Mackenzie "Mickey" Molng
- Sofia Black-D'Elia as Sabrina Pemberton
- Thomas Barbusca as Chip Pemberton
- Jack Stanton as Ben "Benito" Pemberton
- Carla Jimenez as Alba Maldonado
- Scott MacArthur as James "Jimmy" Shepherd

=== Recurring ===
- Tricia O'Kelley as Pamela "Poodle" Pemberton (née Molng)
- Laird Macintosh as Christopher Pemberton
- E. J. Callahan as Colonel Pemberton
- Wayne Wilderson as Principal Gibbons
- Arnell Powell as Fred the Fed (season 1)

=== Guest ===
- Asif Ali (comedian) as Security Guard
- Dave Annable as Teddy
- Bert Belasco as Dante
- Paul Ben-Victor as Jerry Berlin
- Cayden Boyd as Matty Pruitt
- Brianna Brown as Aimee
- Jordan Calloway as Marcus/Tre
- Christopher Darga as Pit Boss
- Julie Ann Emery as Karen
- John Ennis as Sully
- Jada Facer as Olivia
- Andy Favreau as Kai
- Kirk Fox as Loan Shark
- Mo Gaffney as Principal Rita
- Jennie Garth as herself
- Matthew Glave as Howard Buckley
- Griffin Gluck as Dylan
- Rodney J. Hobbs as Lt. Shields
- Jason Kravits as Barry
- Izabella Miko as Yulia
- Jay Mohr as Bert
- Sam Pancake as Oliver Fishburn
- Susan Park as Liz
- Jeris Poindexter as Elderly Black Man
- Judith Roberts as Great-Grandma Rita Pemberton
- David Rees Snell as Don
- Lester Speight as Dominic
- Concetta Tomei as Grandma Evelyn “Tippy” Pemberton
- Suzanne Whang as Dr. Frenkel
- Kevin Will as Omicron
- Michaela Watkins as Trish
- Rachel York as Dr. Goodby
- Sophia Ali as Alexis

== Episodes ==
Season	Episodes	Originally released	
Season	Episodes	First released	Last released
1	17	January 1, 2017	May 2, 2017
2	20	September 26, 2017	April 3, 2018

=== Season 1 (2017) ===
No. overall	No. in season	Title	Directed by	Written by	Original release date	Prod. code	U.S. viewers (millions)
1	1	"Pilot"	Randall Einhorn	Dave Chernin & John Chernin	January 1, 2017 (broadcast); December 25, 2016 (online and VOD)	1AZT01	8.58
Irresponsible woman Mackenzie "Mickey" Molng is visiting her sister Poodle, who married into wealth after working as a topless waitress, when Poodle and her husband Christopher are arrested by the FBI for fraud and tax evasion. Poodle asks Mickey to watch her children until things are sorted out. Mickey immediately clashes with oldest daughter Sabrina and neighbor Liz, gives bad advice to middle child Chip, and causes youngest child Ben to have an allergic reaction. Just as Mickey decides she isn't cut out for parenting, Poodle calls to say that she and Christopher have fled the country and she will need to watch the kids long term.
2	2	"The Grandparents"	Randall Einhorn	Dave Chernin & John Chernin	January 3, 2017	1AZT02	3.37
Mickey decides to return to her home in Rhode Island with Alba in tow, leaving the kids in the hands of Evelyn (Concetta Tomei), the strict and stern grandmother who is Christopher's mother. Evelyn is abusive towards the children, hitting them and restricting freedoms. Mickey drugs Alba after she refuses to take ecstasy, and the two go out to a club together. However, Mickey is forced back to Greenwich when Jimmy's loan shark (Kirk Fox) pays a visit, and leaves Alba as collateral. Mickey takes over once again as the children's guardian after Evelyn slips on the floor and breaks both her hips following a failed blackmail plot by Mickey.
3	3	"The Buffer"	Todd Biermann	Laura Chinn	January 10, 2017	1AZT04	2.97
Mickey learns that Sabrina isn't using any form of birth control in her relations with new boyfriend Kai. After several unsuccessful attempts to change Sabrina's mind, including Mickey trying to sleep with Kai herself, Mickey and Alba team up to trick Sabrina into thinking she's pregnant. Meanwhile, Chip wants to get a girl at school to make out with him, and gets bad advice from Jimmy, causing him to react in a predatory way to many of the girls in school and attempt to pay them for a make out session. Ben begins excessively taking Mickey's birth control, which causes irrational mood swings.
4	4	"The Balloon"	Randall Einhorn	Scott Marder	January 15, 2017	1AZT07	4.09
After finding out from Ben's doctor that the family forgot Ben's birthday, Mickey and family scramble to throw him a belated party. Ben is suffering from PICA due to the psychological stress of his parents abandoning him. Jimmy hires a washed-up birthday clown for Ben's party with a drug habit, and following an attempt to revive the "overdosed" clown, Ben swallows a tied off balloon. Sabrina and Chip rent a pony for Ben, which ends up taking Chip on an adventure around the neighborhood. Mickey and the family attempt to make Ben throw up the balloon unsuccessfully, until he gets excited upon seeing the pony. It is revealed that the balloon never had drugs in it, but in fact were an unusual method of the clown injecting Insulin and sugar pills to control his diabetes.
5	5	"The Fire"	Kat Coiro	Brian Keith Etheridge and Dave Chernin & John Chernin	January 17, 2017	1AZT08	2.77
Ben has an apparently imaginary friend causing him to do strange things, so Chip tries to remedy the problem by spending more time with his little brother. After Mickey and Sabrina's smoking habit causes a fire that burns down Liz's guest house, they consider blaming it on Ben.
6	6	"The Master"	Iain MacDonald	Harper Dill	January 24, 2017	1AZT06	2.76
After a date with Jimmy becomes a disaster, Mickey meets Teddy Grant (Dave Annable), a wealthy heir who she quickly falls for. She then makes a fool of herself, becoming inebriated from alcohol and sea sick medication on their first date on his yacht. After discovering the master bedroom in the family mansion, Mickey plans on using it for her second date with Teddy. However, Chip and Sabrina argue over the room, with Chip wanting the room free until his parents return home, while Sabrina wants the room for herself, telling Chip their parents aren't coming back. Meanwhile, Alba keeps Ben preoccupied by watching kid-friendly programming on his tablet, but accidentally sets him up to watch horror films instead.
7	7	"The Country Club"	Randall Einhorn	Christine Nangle	January 31, 2017	1AZT05	2.97
The Pembertons' financial advisor says he can't figure out what's going on with their money, but suggests they keep a low profile. At the same time, they learn that tabloid columnist Oliver Fishburn (Sam Pancake) is writing a damning piece about the Pembertons' fall from grace ever since Poodle and Christopher were busted for tax evasion. Mickey decides to go to their country club to intercept him. This backfires when Chip finds he has been demoted to the last foursome in a golf tournament, while Sabrina has to relive an embarrassing incident from her early childhood.
8	8	"The Snitch"	Randall Einhorn	Scott MacArthur	February 7, 2017	1AZT09	2.48
The captain of Chip's school lacrosse team rewards the players for a big win by texting them all a photo of a nude woman (with the head and face not shown). Chip is caught by the principal viewing the photo and has to decide between saving himself or snitching on the team captain, which Mickey strongly suggests he not do. However, when Chip realizes whose body is in the photo, the decision is made for him. Meanwhile, the family Rolls-Royce is keyed by someone while Alba is out in it with Ben, forcing Alba to make Ben ignore what he heard from Mickey and become a snitch himself.
9	9	"The Mess"	Geeta V. Patel	Lindsay Golder	February 14, 2017	1AZT10	2.47
Mickey is not surprised when Sabrina and Chip won't recognize her authority, but she is disappointed when they start to turn Ben against her, too. As the kids and Jimmy head off to a white trash party thrown by Sabrina's friend, Mickey tries to gain leverage any way she can and earn their respect. Eventually she gives Ben a sound spanking.
10	10	"The Baggage"	Matt Sohn	Scott Marder	February 21, 2017	1AZT11	2.38
Mickey does not want her latest romantic interest Dante (Bert Belasco) to know about her "baggage", but it turns out he is great with the Pemberton kids – perhaps to a fault. Meanwhile, the other men who are interested in Mickey (Jimmy, Jerry from the club, and Fred the Fed) try to sabotage her romance with Dante. Also, Ben keeps killing his pet rabbit, only to have it replaced by Alba every time because she doesn't think he's ready to learn about death.
11	11	"The New Girl"	Randall Einhorn	Brian Keith Etheridge	February 28, 2017	1AZT03	2.41
After the principal strongly suggests that Ben does not fit in and is falling behind in his studies, Mickey angrily pulls him from the school. With only two schools accepting new students, one of them a public school 40 miles away, Mickey lets Ben dress up like a girl and tries to present him as transgender to the private all-girls school across the street. Meanwhile, after Mickey suggests that Sabrina and Chip have no diversity in their life, both hang with Alba and try to learn more about her culture.
12	12	"The Wolf"	Randall Einhorn	Mehar Sethi	March 21, 2017	1AZT12	2.25
Chip goes through a website to get an Eastern European girlfriend named Yulia (Izabella Miko). He then sends her money to come to America, however, Mickey is sure he's been taken and tries to give him life lessons to toughen him up. Meanwhile, Sabrina's fiancé Kai quits his schooling for his career path and starts hanging out with Jimmy, causing Sabrina to worry that Kai will be a lifelong slacker like Jimmy.
13	13	"The Bully"	Kat Coiro	Nancy M. Pimental	March 28, 2017	1AZT13	2.41
After hearing that Sabrina is being bullied online by a classmate, Mickey tries to help by learning how to be a cyber-bully herself, but she only makes things worse. Meanwhile, Jimmy can't afford to have a painful tooth extracted because he has no insurance, so he attempts a self-extraction with help from Chip and Ben.
14	14	"The Heater"	Randall Einhorn	Scott Marder	April 4, 2017	1AZT14	2.09
When Mickey notices Ben has used casino chips for planets in a solar system diorama, and Ben reveals there are more chips hidden in his dad's den, Mickey's old gambling addiction kicks in. Alba tries to rescue Mickey from the casino, but gets caught up in the rush herself. With the two gone, Sabrina, Chip and Jimmy argue over who should be in charge of the household. Meanwhile, Ben travels to the casino on a bus all alone and is encountered by Alba outside the casino who brings him back safely.
15	15	"The Sleepover"	Silver Tree	Dominic Dierkes & Christian Lander	April 11, 2017	1AZT15	2.17
Chip is thrilled when a popular classmate named Dylan (Griffin Gluck) seems to like him, and he invites him for a sleepover in hopes that it will increase his own popularity. It turns out Dylan is using Chip to have a place to make out with his girlfriend, given that Mickey has a reputation for being a lax parental guardian. Meanwhile, Ben's recurring nightmare becomes all too real when Jimmy pulls a prank on Alba.
16	16	"The Implant"	Richie Keen	Dave Chernin & John Chernin	April 25, 2017	1AZT17	2.27
Sabrina says her mom promised her breast implants for her 18th birthday and wants to cash in the gift early. Mickey goes along and suggests they first wear implants under their bras so she can prove to Sabrina how her life will change. But a mishap when the ladies do brunch leads to an expensive implant being destroyed. Meanwhile, Mickey orders Jimmy to do some "man stuff" with Chip and Ben after the boys are afraid of a spider. Jimmy takes them to a New England Patriots football game, where he gets into a fight with Green Bay Packers fans.
17	17	"The Intruder"	Matt Sohn	Mehar Sethi	May 2, 2017	1AZT16	1.89
The family has an encounter with a couple of home intruders who turn out to be Christopher and Poodle, the kids' fugitive parents. Their return puts Mickey at odds with them on who is a better fit for the children. Meanwhile, Jimmy is shot during the altercation which lands him in a hospital bed and in police custody for some outstanding warrants. He then decides to play the long game in exchanging Christopher and Poodle's freedom for his own. Poodle forces Alba to be the maid again, so she schemes to rid the household of her and Christopher for good. Jimmy is last seen being electrically shocked after the police receive the parents' whereabouts from Alba. Christopher and Poodle are eventually attacked by police dogs and arrested, but not before Poodle states that Chip isn't Christopher's biological son. In the aftermath, Mickey and the family prepare to tell Ben about the news, but he has lit his room on fire, and the entire Pemberton house is soon engulfed in flames.

=== Season 2 (2017–18) ===
No. overall	No. in season	Title	Directed by	Written by	Original release date	Prod. code	U.S. viewers (millions)
18	1	"The Hotel"	Richie Keen	Dave Chernin & John Chernin	September 26, 2017	2AZT01	2.67
After losing their mansion, the family takes up residence in an expensive resort hotel. With their spending out of control, their financial advisor Barry (Jason Kravits) freezes their accounts and the family is forced to move into a much cheaper hotel room. In response, Mickey and Sabrina attempt to blackmail Barry with incriminating photos, but the plot backfires and the family moves back to their ruined mansion. Meanwhile, Jimmy takes Chip under his wing, but their relationship is challenged by Chip's desire to hide his problems from his friends. In an attempt to cure Alba of her alcoholism, Ben performs an exorcism on her.
19	2	"The Friend"	Matt Sohn	Heather Flanders	October 3, 2017	2AZT02	2.41
With the family squabbling, Mickey goes to the gym to escape them. There, she meets Trish (Michaela Watkins), a divorcee looking for companionship, and makes her first real friend. She also sets up Trish with Jimmy, and the two fall for each other, encouraged by Alba, who wants to spend more time with Mickey. But Mickey is surprised to find herself becoming jealous of Jimmy being with Trish. When Mickey and Alba crash the wedding of Trish's ex, Mickey confesses her feelings for Jimmy before fainting from blood loss due to an injury she sustained. Trish ends up saving Mickey by donating her blood, and she and Jimmy move back in together. Meanwhile, Chip's attempt to convince his siblings he's "cool" by fighting a squirrel in his room ends with him getting bitten and contracting rabies.
20	3	"The Visit"	Kat Coiro	Scott Marder	October 10, 2017	2AZT03	2.24
After a meltdown at a picnic, Mickey decides to take Sabrina to visit her mother in prison, while Jimmy takes Chip and Ben to see Christopher. Poodle's sincere apology to Sabrina upsets Mickey, who feels that her sister purposefully ignored her contributions as guardian. The two sisters get in a fight, which Sabrina breaks up. Chip and Jimmy try to press Christopher's abusive cellmate Ziggy to leave him be, but get blown off. Ben makes friends with some other inmates, who stab Ziggy to death on his behalf. Mickey and Poodle repair their relationship, with Poodle promising to free up some accounts to help her kids. Christopher contacts Chip and thanks him for his efforts, while also hinting that Chip isn't his biological son.
21	4	"The Haunted House"	Matt Sohn	Scott MacArthur	October 17, 2017	2AZT04	2.26
Mickey and Jimmy prepare to throw their annual Halloween party, over Chip's objections. However, things get complicated when Jimmy's planned pranks fail to work as expected, Mickey is forced to pose as a community policeman after knocking a real one out, and Sabrina finds herself with competition for the boy she planned to romance and rants about it publicly, inadvertently insulting everyone at the party with her condescending attitude. Ben eats too much candy and vomits on some electrical cords, triggering all the pranks at once and creating a massive explosion. To cover up the disaster, Mickey allows the real policeman to take credit for busting some vandals she caught earlier. In the aftermath, Jimmy begins planning for next year's party.
22	5	"The Invention"	Rebecca Asher	Matthew Libman & Daniel Libman	November 7, 2017	2AZT05	2.07
Two faculty members tell Mickey they think Ben needs a boost in his ADHD medication. Mickey didn't even know Ben was taking medication and wants him off it completely. She and Alba try to get Ben to come up with an idea for the school's invention fair, but none of Ben's ideas make any sense. Mickey and Alba are also at a loss for ideas, so as they set up Ben's booth, they decide the best course of action is to make it look like all the booths were vandalized and they begin trashing the place. Ben then arrives and reveals his invention: a vest that holds school supplies for his teacher. Elsewhere, the Acorn Boys Club that Chip organized when he was ten has decided they need more "adult" thrills. Enter Jimmy, who brings a crossbow to the next meeting, which Chip and his friends enjoy. However, after a member gets shot in the shoulder by accident, Chip disbands the club and burns down their meeting house.
23	6	"The Matriarch"	Kat Coiro	Eric Falconer	November 14, 2017	2AZT07	2.10
Mickey, Jimmy and the kids attend the 100th birthday of great-grandmother Rita (Judith Roberts). Tippy (Concetta Tomei) attempts to throw them out until Rita, confusing Mickey and Chip for her friend, Helen, and Helen's brain-damaged son, Dippy, insists they stay. When Tippy goes out of town to unwind, Mickey moves the family into her house and takes advantage of Rita's confusion. Jimmy and Sabrina argue over one of the house staff, Jimmy wanting to befriend him and Sabrina wanting to make him her slave. Meanwhile, Ben and Alba get lost in a hedge maze. Mickey and Chip start to argue over Rita. Mickey enjoys being spoiled by Rita but Chip resents being treated as an invalid until he starts getting pampered as well. Eventually, Mickey discovers that Rita is a lesbian and Helen was her lover. Mickey tries to let her down gently by blaming Dippy, which leads Rita to attempt to kill Chip. They decide to leave but after Rita dies in a freak accident, Tippy runs off, leaving her house (and the Colonel) in Mickey's care.
24	7	"The Homecoming"	Richie Keen	Rob Rosell	November 21, 2017	2AZT06	2.14
Jimmy returns to his and Mickey's home town of Warwick to receive an award for his prowess as a star pitcher on the high school baseball team. Things become strained when Jimmy learns that a prank Mickey pulled was responsible for the injury that prevented him from going pro. He ends up getting drunk and setting off fireworks during his ceremony, unintentionally injuring a young pitcher who, coincidentally, was very close to breaking Jimmy's school record for strikeouts. Meanwhile, Chip and Sabrina wander the town, and Chip later wants to call the police when his shoes are stolen. Chip becomes a laughingstock when the thieves are revealed to be a few kids of elementary school age, but he has them arrested nonetheless when they take illicit pictures of Sabrina. Mickey tries to apologize to Jimmy, but he realizes she's not being sincere and decides to walk home.
25	8	"The Teacher"	Eva Longoria	Lindsay Golder	November 28, 2017	2AZT09	2.21
Sabrina has become a pet pupil of her poetry teacher, whom Mickey is convinced is just trying to get in Sabrina's pants. After a poetry reading at a local coffee shop, Mickey sleeps with the teacher instead, earning the ire of Sabrina while putting the teacher's job in jeopardy. Meanwhile, Chip is lamenting his lack of popularity and asks Jimmy's help to make him cooler. Jimmy's idea is to have Ben punch Chip to give him a black eye. He then gives Chip instructions to remain vague and mysterious when his classmates ask what caused the black eye, but Chip instead makes up a story about taking on kids from the public school which leads to a very real fight. Pleased with his ability to help his brother, Ben decides to "help" the loser kids in his class become more popular by punching them all in the eye.
26	9	"The Divorce"	Matt Sohn	Dominic Dierkes	December 5, 2017	2AZT10	2.44
Poodle and Christopher announce their decision to divorce, and reveal to Chip that his real father is a man named Howard Buckley (Matthew Glave). This causes him to fall into despair, until Alba reveals that Howard is very rich. Mickey realizes that she and Jimmy are drifting apart romantically, and they decide to go on a date. Chip locates Howard in Stamford and meets him. Howard thinks Chip is a nice young man, and asks him to escort his daughter Kelly for the night, not knowing she is Chip's half-sister. Chip defends Kelly against an abusive boyfriend. Kelly then kisses him, and when he confesses he's her brother, she kicks him in the crotch. Jimmy gets beaten up by two men who mistake him for a rapist when he and Mickey have a drunken hookup. Howard remembers Poodle, but refuses to believe Chip is his son and throws him out. Mickey and Jimmy conclude that their relationship is toxic, and that they still don't know what they mean to each other.
27	10	"The Climb"	Amy York Rubin	Harper Dill	January 2, 2018	2AZT11	2.28
Sabrina throws a salon for a chance to join the board of an exclusive art museum, even as Mickey accuses her of "social climbing". Howard decides that he should have a place in Chip's life, and invites him to come on a camping trip to Maine. Mickey gets fed up with Ben's new friend Totsi and goes to confront his mother, who turns out to be Jennie Garth, one of Mickey's and Alba's favorite actresses. Mickey invites her to the salon, but Jennie questions her lifestyle choices and Totsi bullies Ben by destroying his possessions and putting him in a chokehold. Chip's lack of outdoor experience causes an accident that breaks Howard's leg, and he ends up having to drag his father to safety through the night. Mickey's attempt to secure an invitation to Mario Lopez's birthday party from Jennie is ruined when Ben exacts revenge on Totsi by shaving off his dreadlocks. Howard gets a DNA test while in the hospital that reveals he is not Chip's biological father; it turns out that Chip's real dad is a convict from New Jersey.
28	11	"The Trip"	Kat Coiro	John Howell Harris	January 9, 2018	2AZT12	2.01
Mickey is insistent that a reluctant Sabrina attend her upcoming interview for Yale. Nervous, she ends up using some of her aunt's stash of acid, and Mickey is forced to take the rest in order to help her. Alba's cousin Dagoberto arrives from Guatemala, and Alba gets Chip to treat her as a maid again so she can pretend to be working. However, when Chip hires Dagoberto as well and abuses his power over Alba, she blackmails him into firing her cousin. Sabrina gets separated from Mickey and winds up in a German teacher's (Flula Borg) class before Mickey finds her; she then dashes off to do the interview, while Mickey winds up in the school's auditorium attempting to perform Blind Melon's "No Rain" on cello, expressing her long-standing desire to be a musician. Sabrina ultimately gets accepted into Yale by being completely honest with her interviewer, and she and Mickey work up the nerve to return home.
29	12	"The City"	Eric Dean Seaton	Heather Flanders	January 16, 2018	2AZT13	2.29
Mickey gets a visit from the police informing her that Jimmy is dead. However, when they check the body, she realizes it isn't him. Chip visits his father Bert (Jay Mohr), who owns the strip club where Poodle used to work. Feeling guilty for not knowing about Chip, Bert tries to connect with him. Jimmy turns out to be a gofer for a prominent financial firm, having assumed Ben's identity. Mickey, hoping to repay Jimmy for all she's done to him, persuades his bosses to let him bring in his own client; Sabrina suggests that he choose Bert. While looking over Jimmy's new office, Mickey suspects that the firm is a "boiler room" operation and that Bert will be ruined. She alerts the IRS, but instead of the financiers, Bert is arrested, and Jimmy is subsequently fired. After Mickey apologizes, Jimmy admits that he misses her and agrees to return to Greenwich.
30	13	"The Dump"	Matt Sohn	Laura Chinn	January 23, 2018	2AZT08	1.93
Mickey and Alba chaperone a field trip to the dump and discover an extra child on the bus when they return to school. The boy won't answer their questions or even talk, but makes friends with Ben. Mickey and Alba try to figure out how to return the boy to where he belongs without appearing to be kidnappers. Chip and Sabrina take their grandfather in his wheelchair to a store where people are standing in line for a new line of exclusive sneakers, and they discover having their grandfather with them gives them advantages.
31	14	"The Church"	Matt Sohn	Dominic Dierkes	February 6, 2018	2AZT14	2.01
With Alba turning to religion to help fight her alcoholism, Mickey decides it's not a bad idea for all of them to go to a church service. Ben has lots of questions about God, which various family members try to answer. Just when it appears Ben is about to lose faith, Jimmy takes matters into his own hands. Meanwhile, Mickey is suspicious about the "friendship" that a young priest has developed with Chip.
32	15	"The Juice"	Matt Sohn	Eric Falconer	February 27, 2018	2AZT15	1.90
Mickey sees Chip and his friend Dylan following some bets they made, then convinces Dylan to bet "a hundred" on the underdog Buffalo Bills to cover the spread against the New England Patriots. At the same time, Sabrina is dating Alexis (Sophia Ali), a girl who plays goalie for a junior soccer team. The team has an upcoming game against a Canadian team. When Jimmy sees that a distracted Alexis is playing badly, his patriotism kicks in and he tries to convince Sabrina to break up with Alexis. The Buffalo Bills get crushed, and the rich Dylan reveals to Mickey that he bet a hundred thousand on the game. Mickey then learns the news from Jimmy about Alexis, and convinces her loan shark to take a $100,000 bet on the USA-Canada amateur soccer game. When Jimmy tries to break up Sabrina and Alexis, the soccer team misinterprets his purpose and a melee ensues. With half of the USA team headed to the hospital, they have to forfeit the game against Canada, and Mickey wins back Dylan's money. At home, Alba is freaked out when The Colonel appears to be able to move himself.
33	16	"The Accident"	Eric Dean Seaton	Daniel Libman & Matthew Libman	March 6, 2018	2AZT16	1.72
When Ben is the only boy from his class not invited to his school friend Troy's sleepover, Mickey and Jimmy petition the child's mother and get her to allow Ben to attend. Ben calls Mickey late that night to say he wet the bed. Mickey, Jimmy and Alba then embark on a night-long adventure to save Ben from embarrassment. Meanwhile, Chip says his friend Eduardo (Faly Rakotohavana) can make foolproof fake IDs for Sabrina and her two friends to get into an exclusive club, but he insists that the girls take him and Eduardo along in exchange for the IDs.
34	17	"The Night Off"	Eva Longoria	Franklin Hardy	March 13, 2018	2AZT18	1.81
When Alba leaves to go on vacation, Mickey appoints Sabrina to babysit Ben when she and Jimmy leave for a night out. Sabrina decides that a night out with her friends is much more appealing, causing her and Mickey get into an argument and end up in jail. With no supervision, Ben goes on a long walk with the Colonel and leaves Chip to fend for himself at home, leading to him chopping off some fingers while making a sandwich. Alba spends her vacation locked in a train bathroom with a rat. Meanwhile, Jimmy befriends a guy named Doug (Benjamin Arthur) who came to his aid during a scuffle over a parking space, but is later disappointed to learn that the man is gay.
35	18	"The Car"	Michael McDonald	Scott Marder	March 20, 2018	2AZT17	1.98
Jimmy and Mickey go to a police auction to buy back Jimmy's Geo, but Jimmy instead buys an old police cruiser. While taking it for a joyride in the country, Jimmy and Mickey accidentally lock themselves out with Ben in the back seat, which is still caged off from the front. Jimmy walks to the nearest town for help as Mickey tries to rescue Ben through the trunk. At home, Sabrina tells Alba and Chip that she's booked an appointment with a tattoo artist she met online named Marcus. Chip confesses to Alba that he is pretending to be Marcus on social media to get closer to Sabrina's friend Holly. Alba decides to have some fun and play both sides, to the point of hiring a male prostitute to show up at the house as Marcus.
36	19	"The Dance"	Dave Chernin	Story by : Laura Chinn; Teleplay by : Dave Chernin & John Chernin	March 27, 2018	2AZT20	1.77
Principal Gibbons calls Mickey into his office and accuses Ben of stealing a teacher's golden apple award. Ben denies it and Mickey initially believes him, but evidence emerges that convinces Mickey otherwise, including finding a gun that Ben stole from a police car. Chip tries to become Spring Formal Prince by eliminating the competition. He eventually wins, only to find that the girl who wins Princess is not who he expected. Sabrina goes to Jimmy to learn dance moves after Mickey tells her that Jimmy's mother was a dance instructor. She says she just wants to impress people at the school dance, but Jimmy soon learns that Sabrina signed up for amateur night at a local strip club.
37	20	"The Graduate"	Matt Sohn	Caroline Fox	April 3, 2018	2AZT19	1.78
Sabrina graduates high school, but tells the family over dinner that she did not get into Yale. Not wanting to be saddled with Sabrina, Mickey and Alba head to Yale to learn from the Dean why Sabrina was rejected. Meanwhile, Chip throws a party and tries to get close to Madison despite several obstacles. Mickey learns that Sabrina was actually accepted and lied to her while Alba pretends to be an alumnus for a reunion party, where she has a one night stand with another alumnus. Mickey confronts Sabrina over her lie, where Sabrina admits that she is scared that she will fail at Yale. Mickey takes her out to a bar where she reveals that her own mother abandoned her and Poodle and gave them each five thousand dollars before disappearing. Poodle used the money to move to New York while Mickey spent it on a samurai sword, which is at the very bar they are at. They create a diversion and steal back the sword, which Mickey gifts to Sabrina. After encouraging Sabrina to ease her fears by swinging the sword around, she is suddenly struck by lightning. At the hospital, the doctors tell Mickey that Sabrina is lucky to be alive, but they cannot determine what sort of long-term damage Sabrina could have sustained until she wakes up.

== Production ==
=== Development ===
The pilot was written by Dave Chernin and John Chernin with Randall Einhorn directing. The series is filmed as a single-camera setup. The Chernins, Olson, and Einhorn serve as executive producers. The show is filmed entirely in California. An actual Los Angeles mansion is used in the series as the Pemberton estate.

=== Casting ===
On February 29, 2016, it was announced that Sofia Black-D'Elia had been cast as Sabrina. It was announced that Kaitlin Olson was cast as Mackenzie on March 2, 2016. Thomas Barbusca, Jack Stanton, and Carla Jimenez were cast as Chip Pemberton, Ben Pemberton, and Alba respectively on March 18, 2016. Susan Park was cast as Liz though she was dropped as a series regular early in the first season and instead appears as a recurring character. The role of Jimmy Shepherd was played by Nat Faxon in the pilot for The Mick, with the knowledge that Faxon's other commitments would prohibit him from continuing in the role if the pilot got picked up to series. Scott MacArthur, who had already been hired as a writer for the series, was later offered the Jimmy role and Fox re-shot the pilot prior to the series debut. On October 10, 2016, Dave Annable was cast as Teddy Grant in a recurring role.

On September 2, 2017, it was announced that Michaela Watkins joins season 2 in a guest role as Trish. On December 5, 2017, it was announced that Jennie Garth has been cast in a guest starring role. The next day, the show's creators revealed that Scott MacArthur had departed as a cast member but will remain as a writer for the show. In January 2018, however, MacArthur, along with showrunners Dave and John Chernin revealed to Den of Geek that MacArthur would in fact not be departing the show as a cast member and that their prior announcement was an effort to stimulate a reaction out the show’s fanbase: "Truth be told, there were people in season one who didn't like Jimmy and we thought that we hadn't given him a fair shake yet. So heading into season two we really wanted to do this character justice and show what was possible with him. It felt really good to see how upset people got when they thought that they were losing him. We think that he's such an integral part of the show and yeah, I don't think the show works as well without him." (His character missed just two episodes after MacArthur's "exit" in "The Divorce" [Season 2, Episode 9], reappearing in "The City" [Season 2, Episode 12].)

== Reception ==
=== Critical response ===
On Rotten Tomatoes, the first season has an approval rating of 58% based on 26 reviews, with an average rating of 6.07/10. The website's critics consensus reads, "Kaitlin Olson's considerable charm isn't enough to keep the intermittently funny The Mick from falling prey to conventional storylines and hard-to-root-for characters." On Metacritic, the season has a weighted average score of 50 out of 100, based on 27 critics, indicating "mixed or average reviews".

=== Ratings ===
==== Season 1 ====
Viewership and ratings per episode of The Mick
No.	Title	Air date	Rating/share (18–49)	Viewers (millions)	DVR (18–49)	DVR viewers (millions)	Total (18–49)	Total viewers (millions)
1	"Pilot"	January 1, 2017	2.8/9	8.58	0.7	1.84	3.5	10.42
2	"The Grandparents"	January 3, 2017	1.3/4	3.37	0.9	2.27	2.2	5.64
3	"The Buffer"	January 10, 2017	1.2/4	2.97	0.9	2.14	2.1	5.11
4	"The Balloon"	January 15, 2017	1.7/5	4.09	0.8	1.82	2.5	5.91
5	"The Fire"	January 17, 2017	1.1/4	2.77	0.8	1.91	1.9	4.68
6	"The Master"	January 24, 2017	1.0/4	2.76	0.9	1.95	1.9	4.71
7	"The Country Club"	January 31, 2017	1.1/4	2.97	0.7	1.65	1.8	4.62
8	"The Snitch"	February 7, 2017	1.0/3	2.48	0.7	1.69	1.7	4.15
9	"The Mess"	February 14, 2017	1.0/4	2.47	0.7	1.69	1.7	4.16
10	"The Baggage"	February 21, 2017	0.9/3	2.38	0.7	1.51	1.6	3.89
11	"The New Girl"	February 28, 2017	0.9/3	2.41	—N/a	—N/a	—N/a	—N/a
12	"The Wolf"	March 21, 2017	0.8/3	2.25	0.7	1.52	1.5	3.77
13	"The Bully"	March 28, 2017	0.9/3	2.41	0.6	1.42	1.5	3.82
14	"The Heater"	April 4, 2017	0.8/3	2.09	0.7	1.46	1.5	3.55
15	"The Sleepover"	April 11, 2017	0.8/3	2.17	0.6	1.32	1.4	3.48
16	"The Implant"	April 25, 2017	0.9/3	2.27	—N/a	—N/a	—N/a	—N/a
17	"The Intruder"	May 2, 2017	0.7/3	1.89	0.6	1.36	1.3	3.25

==== Season 2 ====
Viewership and ratings per episode of The Mick
No.	Title	Air date	Rating/share (18–49)	Viewers (millions)	DVR (18–49)	DVR viewers (millions)	Total (18–49)	Total viewers (millions)
1	"The Hotel"	September 26, 2017	0.9/3	2.67	0.6	1.40	1.5	4.06
2	"The Friend"	October 3, 2017	0.9/3	2.41	—N/a	1.26	—N/a	3.67
3	"The Visit"	October 10, 2017	0.8/3	2.24	—N/a	1.24	—N/a	3.48
4	"The Haunted House"	October 17, 2017	0.8/3	2.26	—N/a	1.35	—N/a	3.61
5	"The Invention"	November 7, 2017	0.7/3	2.07	0.7	1.44	1.4	3.51
6	"The Matriarch"	November 14, 2017	0.7/3	2.10	0.5	1.22	1.2	3.32
7	"The Homecoming"	November 21, 2017	0.7/3	2.14	0.5	1.15	1.2	3.29
8	"The Teacher"	November 28, 2017	0.8/3	2.21	—N/a	1.10	—N/a	3.31
9	"The Divorce"	December 5, 2017	0.8/3	2.44	—N/a	1.19	—N/a	3.63
10	"The Climb"	January 2, 2018	0.8/3	2.28	—N/a	—N/a	—N/a	—N/a
11	"The Trip"	January 9, 2018	0.7/3	2.01	0.6	1.25	1.3	3.26
12	"The City"	January 16, 2018	0.8/3	2.29	—N/a	1.19	—N/a	3.48
13	"The Dump"	January 23, 2018	0.7/2	1.93	0.5	1.27	1.2	3.20
14	"The Church"	February 6, 2018	0.7/3	2.01	0.6	1.25	1.3	3.26
15	"The Juice"	February 27, 2018	0.6/2	1.90	0.5	1.18	1.1	3.08
16	"The Accident"	March 6, 2018	0.6/2	1.72	0.5	1.08	1.1	2.80
17	"The Night Off"	March 13, 2018	0.6/2	1.81	0.5	1.05	1.1	2.86
18	"The Car"	March 20, 2018	0.7/3	1.98	—N/a	—N/a	—N/a	—N/a
19	"The Dance"	March 27, 2018	0.7/3	1.77	—N/a	0.98	—N/a	2.75
20	"The Graduate"	April 3, 2018	0.7/3	1.78	—N/a	1.04	—N/a	2.81

=== Accolades ===
The second season poster was nominated for Best Comedy Poster for a TV Show / TV Series at the 2018 Golden Trailer Awards.
