= Elle (TV series) =

American comedy television series

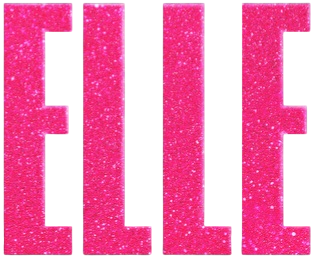
- Genre: Comedy drama Teen drama
- Based on: Legally Blonde by Amanda Brown
- Developed by: Laura Kittrell
- Showrunners: Laura Kittrell; Caroline Dries
- Starring: Lexi Minetree; June Diane Raphael; Tom Everett Scott; Jacob Moskovitz; Gabrielle Policano; Chandler Kinney; Zac Looker; Amy Pietz
- Music by: Tom Howe
- Opening theme: "Only Happy When It Rains" by Garbage
- Country of origin: United States
- Original language: English
- No. of seasons: 1
- No. of episodes: 8

Production
- Executive producers: Marc Platt; Amanda Brown; Brad Van Arragon; Jason Moore; Caroline Dries; Laura Kittrell; Lauren Neustadter; Reese Witherspoon
- Producer: Bryan J. Raber
- Cinematography: Tobias Datum; Shasta Spahn
- Editors: Melissa McCoy; Chris A. Peterson; Nena Erb; Spencer Koobatian
- Running time: 43–56 minutes
- Production companies: Caroline Dries Entertainment; Meridian & Bigbee Productions; Reunion Pacific Entertainment; Hello Sunshine; MGM Television

Original release
- Network: Amazon Prime Video
- Release: July 1, 2026 – present

Elle (also marketed as Elle: From the World of Legally Blonde) is an American comedy television series developed by Laura Kittrell, serving as a prequel to the Legally Blonde franchise. The series takes place six years before the events of the first film and it explores the high school years of teenage Elle Woods (originally portrayed by Reese Witherspoon), portrayed by newcomer Lexi Minetree.

The series is helmed by showrunner Kittrell and is executive producing alongside Witherspoon and producer Marc Platt. Production began in April 2025. It premiered on July 1, 2026. In January 2026, the series was renewed for a second season.

== Premise ==
A prequel to Legally Blonde, the series explores Elle Woods’ teenage years in the 1990s as a high school student in Seattle, long before she became the ambitious Harvard law student in the films.

== Cast ==
=== Main ===
- Lexi Minetree as Elle Woods, a 16-year-old girl whose life is turned upside-down when she has to move from Los Angeles to Seattle
- June Diane Raphael as Eva Woods, Elle's mother who is trying to make the best of her living situation
- Tom Everett Scott as Wyatt Woods, Elle's father, a plastic surgeon who tries to see the best in every situation
- Jacob Moskovitz as Miles Cohen, a cross country star runner at Rainier West High School who takes an interest in Elle
- Gabrielle Policano as Liz Miller, an out and proud lesbian at Rainier West High School whom Elle befriends
- Chandler Kinney as Kimberly Carter, a mean girl at Rainier West High School whom Elle tries to befriend
- Zac Looker as Dustin, a British student and activist for Rainier West High School who is interested in Elle
- Amy Pietz as Donna Miller, the secretary at Rainier West High School in Seattle that Elle goes to and Liz's mother

=== Recurring ===
- Matt Oberg as Principal Shane Anderson, the principal of Rainier West High School
- Jessica Belkin as Madison LeDoux, Elle's best friend in Los Angeles
- Kayla Maisonet as Tiffany, one of Elle’s Los Angeles friends
- Logan Shroyer as Hot Josh, a boy in Los Angeles who Elle has feelings for
- Lisa Yamada as Amber, one of Elle’s Los Angeles friends
- Chloe Wepper as Ms. Burke, Elle's chemistry teacher at Rainier West High School, later acting principal.
- David Burtka as Chad Cohen, one of Miles’ dads who befriends Elle’s parents
- Danielle Chand as Shannon Walker, a stylish girl that Elle tries to befriend, Kimberly's best friend and Miles' ex-girlfriend
- James Van Der Beek as Dean Wilson, the current superintendent and Medina's new mayoral candidate
- Brad Harder as Charlie Cohen, Miles’ other dad and Chad’s husband who befriends Elle’s parents

== Episodes ==
No.	Title	Directed by	Written by	Original release date
1	"Pilot"	Jason Moore	Laura Kittrell	July 1, 2026
Elle Woods is celebrating her Sweet 16 at her house in Bel-Air when her parents Wyatt and Eva tell her that her father lost his job and they are relocating to Seattle, upsetting Elle, so to compensate, her mother gets her a Chihuahua that she names Bruiser. Elle starts her first day at Rainier West High School, but her LA sensibilities clash with everyone's laid-back and uninspired vibe, she makes acquaintances with students Liz and Dustin, and befriends star athlete Miles, but is rejected by senior Kimberly due to her appearance. The school's secretary Donna shows her compassion and reveals to her that she often bends the rules to help students. Elle's best friend Madison convinces her to try to be more relatable, but Kimberly accuses her of being a poser to get everyone to like her. Upset, her mother motivates her to get more involved, so she helps Dustin with a school auction by explaining that the purpose is to give the support staff fair wages, especially Donna, explaining everything she has done for them, and the crowd backs her up. Unfortunately the next day, Donna is fired because Elle exposed the rules she has broken, leaving Elle feeling guilty.
2	"No Silly, I Go Here"	Jason Moore	Eli Wilson Pelton	July 1, 2026
Elle starts a petition to get Donna rehired, but Principal Anderson refuses due to all of the rules Donna has broken, just as he receives an orange suede coat that he claims is his wife's, Donna forgives Elle but asks her not to interfere. Elle meets Shannon, a nice senior who is also best friends with Kimberly, she brings her mother to Shannon's mother Robin's book signing, where Elle learns that Seattle women do not wear suede, leading Elle to believe that Anderson is cheating on his wife, and they decide to use this as leverage to get Donna's job back, meanwhile Elle’s mother embarrasses her by comparing her father losing her job to Robin being evicted due to racism. Elle invites Liz to an event at CarpetMart hoping to reconvene with Shannon, where Kimberly reveals that Donna is Liz's mother and Liz admits that they live outside the school district but Anderson lets her attend school and could get expelled if Anderson gets fired. Feeling useless, Dustin cheers her up by getting her to enjoy the concert before being knocked out. Miles takes her to the hospital and they have a moment before she discovers Miles and Shannon are dating.
3	"You're Not The Girl I Thought You Were"	Sammi Cohen	Asmita Paranjape	July 1, 2026
Elle is avoiding Miles who is making advances towards her, Kimberly notices and writes "SLUT" on Elle's locker. Meanwhile, her parents throw a housewarming party to impress the neighborhood, but Elle asks Dustin to be her date to Kimberly's pool party instead to make her think he is her boyfriend, in exchange for exposing Anderson, which she makes him promise to do so legally. Elle tries to befriend Liz, but she does not understand why. At the party, Elle discovers that Kimberly's pool is not for swimming, making Elle's bikini stand out. Embarrassed, she calls Liz and admits that she likes her because she does not care, so Liz shows up and convinces Elle to try not caring and she ends up having fun. Eva's party is off to a poor start as everyone asks for things that she'd never serve, like beer and bread, but Wyatt saves it by performing on guitar. Eva also meets superintendent and mayoral candidate Dean Wilson. Dustin exposes Anderson's actions to the party, breaking Elle’s promise, but Liz reveals her situation to him and accepts Elle's friendship. Elle discovers that Miles is her neighbor. The next day, Elle, with Shannon, paint her locker pink.
4	"I'm Not Afraid Of A Challenge"	Sammi Cohen	Julia Brownell	July 1, 2026
Elle becomes a finalist for an internship at Cosmopolitan magazine in LA that she had been applying to for months, her mom offers to help by making a video. Elle convinces the student council to throw a homecoming for the school's cross country team, she has Kimberly set up a pep rally, but nobody shows up because Kimberly chose to use email to get the word out. Liz gives Dustin's blessing to take down Anderson. Shannon convinces Elle to take command, but to do things the school's way, while revealing that she broke up with Miles. The day of the race, homecoming goes perfectly, Liz confronts Dustin on his motivations regarding Elle, Dean offers Eva a position on his team, but she refuses due to her commitment to the video. Miles wins the race and later he has a moment with Elle, but her mom interrupts them with the video, and Elle realizes that her mom is using the contest to return to LA so she quits, now preferring Seattle. Elle and Miles kiss before she realizes what it means for Shannon. Back at school, Liz tells Elle that Shannon's mother died in a car crash.
5	"Trust Me, I Can Handle Anything"	Pete Chatmon	Jen Regan	July 1, 2026
Shannon returns to school, and Elle and Miles agree to let Elle tell her about the kiss when the time is right. Elle offers to help Kimberly plan Robin's memorial, but is surprised by Madison's sudden arrival, so Elle navigates planning with Madison, leaving Madison feeling left out. Elle chooses the Rainforest Cafe as the venue and Kimberly thanks her. Wyatt helps Eva get used to Seattle, while revealing to Madison that Elle dropped out of the contest. At the memorial, Madison discovers Elle never mentioned her to her friends, she tries to get Elle to leave but she keeps trying to help out, so she angrily questions Elle's priorities, to which Elle admits that she likes Seattle now, so Madison leaves upset and kisses Dustin. Kimberly becomes drunk so Elle takes over the eulogy and gives a heartfelt speech before everyone laughs at the cafe's animatronics. Miles then tells Shannon about the kiss, leaving her heartbroken, he tells Elle and she begs him not to say anything else, before Madison comforts her and they reconcile. After Fall Break, Kimberly tells Elle that Shannon transferred to Denver, while Eva, now sick of Seattle, secretly mails Elle's application.
6	"Whoever Said Orange Is The New Pink Was Seriously Disturbed"	Pete Chatmon	Chad Charlie	July 1, 2026
Elle discovers that Robin died because the intersection she crashed on does not have a stop sign despite the fact that the city had approved it, because Principal Anderson ordered one but never paid for it. Elle, Liz, Dustin, Miles and Donna discuss a way to expose Anderson for embezzlement, by breaking into the school's account files and finding the receipts for the missing supplies, so they purposely get detention. The group, with Kimberly in tow, plan to steal Frank the custodian's keys, they create a distraction, until Anderson takes over as detention monitor. Elle distances from Miles and points out a strained but budding connection between Kimberly and Liz. Eva reveals Elle's plan to Dean while helping his campaign. Kimberly fakes a peanut allergy to distract Anderson while Miles goes to take pictures of the fraud receipts as well as a photo of a woman wearing the orange coat with a girl. Elle activates the sprinklers to protect Miles and takes the blame. The group concludes that the woman is Anderson's mistress and the girl is their daughter. Meanwhile Donna is framed for stealing the embezzled money and arrested, and the group consider that Donna has been blackmailing Anderson.
7	"You Picked The Wrong Girl"	Stacie Passon	Caroline Dries	July 1, 2026
Donna's attorney does not believe in the principal's embezzlement theory because of the receipts. Elle later records testimonial videos about Donna, but nobody takes it seriously, asks Dustin to the winter formal and intercepts a call Principal Anderson makes to a California earthquake insurance company. Elle tries to convince her mother to broadcast the testimonial at the debate, but Eva wants to focus on Dean, leaving Elle feeling conflicted about how she feels about her mom. Kimberly records her own testimonials and admits her feelings to Liz and Elle tells Liz that she wishes her mom was more like Donna, and Liz gifts her a pink plaid jacket as thanks. Eva tells Elle that Donna pleaded guilty and Dean screened Anderson before hiring him, which makes Elle think that the receipts may not be real. Elle hijacks the debate and reveals that Dean, who owns the insurance company as a front to hide the money, had been blackmailing Anderson, using the money to fund his campaign, and they are arrested. Donna gets her job back and everyone celebrates Elle for saving the school, but Shannon returns and exposes Elle's insulting contest essay, and everyone turns on her.
8	"What, Like It's Hard"	Stacie Passon	Laura Kittrell	July 1, 2026
Elle's reputation is ruined so she and her mother move back to LA. Elle returns to her old life while interning at Cosmopolitan, but she feels uncomfortable with the familiar and safe setting. Meanwhile, the winter formal is canceled due to budget cuts, so Liz, Dustin, Miles and Kimberly, all missing Elle, host their own formal at CarpetMart as a fundraiser called "Winter Informal". Elle takes a risk at Cosmopolitan and wins a spot at the Golden Globes, but feels like everything has become too expected for her and misses the challenges of Seattle. Her manager convinces her to take challenges in stride and she convinces her mother to return to Seattle after an encounter with her father's failed nose job patient and bids a heartfelt goodbye to Madison. Back in Seattle, Elle reconciles with Shannon, while Eva blames Wyatt’s career for dictating how her life has turned out. Elle races to Winter Informal where Liz is performing, who just kissed Kimberly. Elle sees the layout and feels like she did make a difference. Everyone is happy to see Elle, except Dustin, who is upset that she left. He kisses her, which Miles sees, and both boys leave jealous, leaving Elle conflicted.

== Production ==
=== Development ===
As a planned Legally Blonde 3 languished in development hell, in April 2023, it was announced that after acquiring MGM, Amazon had plans to expand the Legally Blonde franchise with a television series in development.

On May 14, 2024, Amazon Prime Video announced a new upcoming prequel series, Elle with Laura Kittrell developing the series. In a statement, Reese Witherspoon, who hosted the announcement, said that viewers "will get to know how Elle Woods navigated her world as a teenager with her distinct personality and ingenuity, in ways that only our beloved Elle could do." The series is co-showrun and executive produced by Kittrell and Caroline Dries. Jason Moore directed the first two episodes of season one and serves as an executive producer. Reese Witherspoon, Lauren Neustadter, Lauren Kisilevsky, Marc Platt and Amanda Brown, the author of Legally Blonde novel, also serve as executive producers.

In January 2025, Witherspoon said in an interview that she was inspired to create the spinoff series after watching Netflix's Wednesday series starring Jenna Ortega. "I saw that Wednesday Addams show and I was like, 'Oh, she was in high school.' I loved it. I watched every episode. I thought it was amazing," Witherspoon said. "And I was like, 'We should do Elle Woods in high school because I wanted to see who she was before college, before law school. And I started having all these ideas and these amazing writers came up with a great pitch and now Amazon is making the show and it's called Elle." In January 2026, the series was renewed for a second season.

=== Casting ===
In February 2025, newcomer Lexi Minetree was cast as Elle Woods, who was originally portrayed by Witherspoon in the original films.

In March, June Diane Raphael and Tom Everett Scott were cast as Elle's parents, Eva and Wyatt. In that same month Chandler Kinney, Gabrielle Policano and Jacob Moskovitz joined the cast as Kimberly, Liz, and Miles. In April, Zac Looker, Jessica Belkin, Logan Shroyer, and Amy Pietz joined the cast as Dustin, Madison, Josh, and Donna. In May, Lisa Yamada, Chloe Wepper, David Burtka, Brad Harder, Kayla Maisonet, and James Van Der Beek, in what would be his final role before his death, joined the cast in key recurring roles. In February 2026, Maitreyi Ramakrishnan joined the cast for the second season as Sam.

=== Filming ===
Principal photography began on April 2, 2025, in Vancouver, including in places such as Point Grey Secondary School and Granville Island and concluded on July 22, 2025. Filming for the second season began on March 4, 2026, and wrapped on June 19, 2026.

== Release ==
Elle premiered on July 1, 2026.

== Reception ==
The review aggregator website Rotten Tomatoes holds a 55% approval rating based on 44 critic reviews, with an average of rated reviews of 5.3/10. The website's critics consensus reads, "Lexi Minetree brings sparkle and excellent mimicry to rehashed proceedings in Elle, a mildly entertaining case study adhering to the confusing laws of prequel nostalgia." Metacritic, which uses a weighted average, assigned a score of 52 out of 100 based on 18 critics, indicating "mixed or average" reviews.
