= Tasha Ghouri =

English television personality (born 1998)

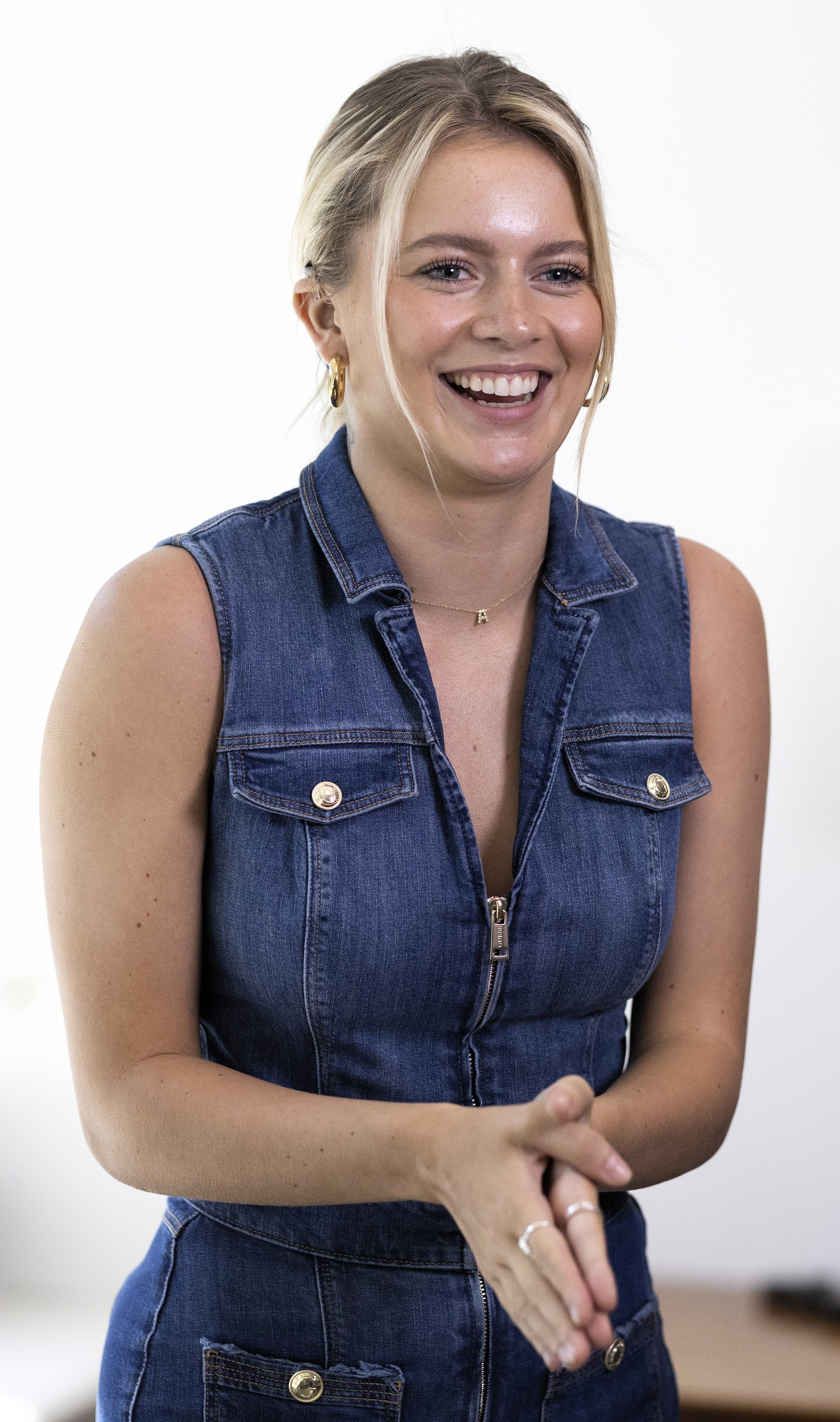
- Ghouri in 2023
- Born: Natasha Amber Ghouri; 11 August 1998 (age 28); Thirsk, North Yorkshire, England
- Occupations: Model; author; dancer; television personality

Natasha Amber Ghouri (/ɡʊriː/, born 11 August 1998) is a British television personality and author. She was born in Thirsk and has been deaf from birth. Having taken up ballet at the age of three, she became a commercial dancer and fashion model, appearing in the music video for "More Than Words" by Sleepwalkers featuring MNEK and a cast of Hard of Hearing dancers, and initially attracted attention for modelling earrings for ASOS. Her appearances on the eighth series of Love Island, on which she and Andrew Le Page finished joint-fourth, brought her numerous ambassadorial roles, and she later launched a podcast, Superpowers with Tasha, and released a book, Hits Different.

In 2024, she spent a week as the Dictionary Corner guest on Countdown, and later that month, the BBC reported that she had gone viral on TikTok after uploading a Get Ready With Me video to the platform using her deaf accent. She was a contestant and runner-up on Series 22 of Strictly Come Dancing, on which she was partnered with Aljaž Škorjanec, and appeared in the 2025 edition of Strictly Come Dancing Live! with him.

== Life and career ==
=== 1998–2022: Early life and Love Island ===
Natasha Amber Ghouri (Note: For Natasha, see Leach (2021). For Amber, see Hutton and Pandey (2024).) (/ɡʊriː/) was born on 11 August 1998 in Thirsk. Both she and her brother are of Indian and Pakistani descent. She was born deaf and was initially fitted for hearing aids before being given a single cochlear implant at Bradford Royal Infirmary just before her fifth birthday. Until then, she was not oral, having communicated entirely in British Sign Language until that point, and she later underwent speech therapy. Her cochlear implant lasted until she was sixteen, when it broke internally and went unreplaced for five months. She told Naga Munchetty in December 2022 that her deafness causes migraines and exhaustion due to the need to constantly lip read, and she told the Radio Times in May 2024 that this fatigue can require her to spend "a few days in bed" to recuperate on account of sensory overload.

Ghouri took up ballet aged three, although she stated in an August 2024 Kiss interview that she was "not good" at it. Growing up, she would replicate the choreography of her parents' copy of the Steps album Gold: Greatest Hits. She later attended Thirsk Primary School, CAPA College, and Creative Academy in Slough. She stated in August 2024 that she had been trained in commercial streetstyle. After graduating, she moved to London, where she signed to a modelling agency and worked as a self-employed dancer behind a bar. She then spent six months in France.

In October 2020, she featured in the music video for "More Than Words" by Sleepwalkrs featuring MNEK, which was directed by Mike Baldwin and featured a performance from a dance troupe composed of deaf and hard-of-hearing dancers. In April 2021, ASOS ran an advertising campaign for earrings featuring Ghouri, for which they went viral over their choice to hire a cochlear implant wearer and attracted praise from Sense, The National Deafblind and Rubella Association and the Royal National Institute for Deaf People. She later dated Giovanni Pernice after the pair connected via Instagram; they met in January 2022, though their relationship dissipated after he undertook the Strictly Come Dancing: The Live Tour! 2022.

"I think for me, it was just kind of, you know what, once-in-a-lifetime opportunity and for me I wanted to go on for representation for the deaf community, and I did want to find someone, you know. I'd never really had that partner, someone to snuggle up to, and, well, I've got someone out of it, so it's a bonus."

— Ghouri on Countdown

In 2022, Ghouri applied for the ITV2 dating show Love Island; she told an October 2023 edition of Grace Beverley's Working Hard, Hardly Working podcast that she had previously applied for Too Hot to Handle but was told that she was not right for the programme and that a producer who worked on both shows passed her name on. ITV announced in May 2022 that Ghouri would be an original contestant on Love Island's eighth series, becoming the format's first deaf contestant. She later used an April 2023 tweet to allege that filming for Love Island had obstructed her from filming for the 2023 film Barbie, for which she had auditioned as a dancer and got through to the finals.

Ghouri was initially coupled up with Andrew Le Page after facing a public vote, though she was taken on dates by Jay Younger and Charlie Radnedge two weeks in. She and Le Page remained a couple until the format's Casa Amor, when Le Page spent a brief period with Coco Lodge before breaking up with her and Ghouri spent a brief period with Billy Brown before breaking up with him. A disgruntled Lodge later revealed to their fellow Islanders what she and Le Page had got up to on the first night of Casa Amor, and Le Page went viral for his awkward explanation to Ghouri that he had "licked her tit, or whatever".

Ghouri and Le Page ultimately made the final and placed joint-fourth, spending 58 days on the show. While on the show, Ghouri received a large amount of abuse for the way she spoke, with "girls mocking Tasha" receiving over 6.1 million views on TikTok. The volume of abuse directed at Ghouri led her social media delegates to request that commentators stop mocking her deafness, and in December 2022, ITV announced that it would ban Islanders from having active social media accounts during their time on the programme. She and Le Page moved in to an apartment in East London in September 2022 and adopted Luna, a Spanish Podenco mixed breed, in June 2023.

=== 2022–present: Subsequent career and Strictly Come Dancing ===
After Love Island, Ghouri used her platform to encourage people to learn sign language. In August 2022, eBay announced that Ghouri would be their first 'pre-loved' ambassador, and the following month she released a 60-item collection on the website, with proceeds going to the Royal National Institute for Deaf People; also in September, she became an ambassador for Cadbury Fingers, for whom she filmed a campaign video in conjunction with the National Deaf Children's Society, and L'Oréal. She later became an ambassador for Ann Summers, for whom she featured in their Christmas advert and fronted their Luminescent collection; Sisters & Seekers, a Llay-based fashion label; and Lullabellz, a hair care and beauty brand.

In December 2022, Ghouri appeared as a contestant on the Weakest Link and on Britain Get Singing, a singing competition; she later appeared on the seventh series of CelebAbility. In 2023, she launched a podcast, Superpowers with Tasha, in which she reimagines disabilities as superpowers. In September 2023, Ghouri and the London-based autistic author and editor Lizzie Huxley-Jones announced that they were writing a romantic novel, Hits Different, in which a deaf young adult pursues her dream of becoming a dancer; Wales Online used their article to note that Ghouri had made their announcement to her 1,500,000 followers. Hot Key Books later acquired the rights to the novel, which was released in June 2024.

In January and February 2024, she spent a week as the Dictionary Corner guest on the UK game show Countdown, shortly after which she and Johannes Radebe taught a beginner's tap class at Meadows Community Centre in Cambridge in which Queen Camilla was a participant. In January 2024, she uploaded a Get Ready With Me video to TikTok in which she removed her cochlear implant and spoke in her deaf accent. By 6 February, it had acquired "almost 3 million views", been widely shared on the platform, and been praised by the Royal National Institute for Deaf People. RTÉ reported on 15 February that Ghouri had uploaded the video to "her nearly 863k followers". Appearing on that day's Lorraine, Ghouri explained that she wanted to upload a video to that effect since leaving Love Island but had not felt ready. That month, the Advertising Standards Authority placed her on their non-compliance page for routinely posting unlabelled adverts despite previous warnings. She then took part in a government campaign to combat loneliness, alongside Josh Patterson, Bobby Brazier, Bradley Riches, Anastasia Kingsnorth, and Bronte King.

In August 2024, Ghouri was announced as a contestant on the twenty-second series of Strictly Come Dancing, a competition where celebrities are taught ballroom dance and Latin dance styles. She was the format's second deaf contestant after previous contestant Rose Ayling-Ellis, who won her series, and the second Love Island alumnus after Zara McDermott. Her participation was announced in an interview on Kiss presented by Jordan Banjo and Perri Kiely and was praised by the National Deaf Children's Society. She received backlash from those questioning why trained dancers were allowed to compete in an amateur competition and used a subsequent social media post to state that she had "never learned or been taught" any of the programme's styles. Her series was the first to insist on training sessions being supervised following allegations levelled at both Pernice and McDermott's partner Graziano Di Prima.

She was partnered with Aljaž Škorjanec during the series' launch show. Ghouri coped with the series by taking her implant out for around half an hour just before the live shows and attracted press attention after disclosing that she had been suffering from cyberbullying over her accent and after her cochlear implant dislodged during an Argentine tango to "Ex Wives" from Six. They received the first perfect score of the series on 23 November 2024 for their American Smooth to Lewis Capaldi's "Someone You Loved", though appeared in the bottom two during the next two weeks. They made the series final, which was broadcast on 14 December, and a repeat showing of their "Someone You Loved" dance caused show judge Anton Du Beke to describe her as the best contestant in the history of the show. The pair finished joint second overall behind Chris McCausland and Dianne Buswell and appeared in the 2025 edition of Strictly Come Dancing Live!. She subsequently became a roving reporter on the 2025 series of Strictly Come Dancing: It Takes Two.

Le Page announced in February 2025 that he and Ghouri had split up, though rumours had swirled a month earlier, and Ghouri later stated that she ended the relationship and had kept Luna. She subsequently dated YouTuber Cam Whitnall. Following her appearances on Strictly Come Dancing, she released a further book, Your Superpower, in which she discussed obstacles her deafness had caused and attributed the split to her appearance on Strictly. Between August 2025 and April 2026, she appeared on two episodes of Celebrity SAS: Who Dares Wins, episodes of The Hit List, The Celebrity Inner Circle, Would I Lie to You?, and The Weakest Link, a week of Richard Osman's House of Games, and a series of Pilgrimage. She launched a range of products in Next in February 2026.
