= Geek Girl =

2013 debut novel of Holly Smale

- First edition
- Author: Holly Smale
- Language: English
- Subject: Fashion; Self-confidence; Modelling; Friendship; Bullying
- Genre: Young adult fiction Fiction
- Publisher: HarperCollins
- Publication date: 28 February 2013
- Publication place: United Kingdom
- Pages: 356
- Awards: Waterstones Children's Book Prize; Leeds Book Award
- ISBN: 0007489447
- OCLC: 900475810

Geek Girl is the debut novel by Holly Smale, published in 2013. It won a 2014 Waterstones Children's Book Prize prize, along with a 2014 Leeds Book Award. It has spawned a series of Geek Girl novels by Smale. Geek Girl has been translated into 30 languages.

== Plot summary ==
The novel tells the story of Harriet Manners, a socially awkward 15-year-old English girl with a limited circle of friends, a (now) supermodel boyfriend and who is the target of the school bully. Plucked from obscurity to be the face of a high-profile fashion advertising campaign, Manners' change of circumstance results in various conflicts which she must resolve, leading to revelations about herself and the world in general.

== Background ==
The novel is partially based on Smale's own experiences as a teenage model.

Although Smale did not write the main character Harriet as autistic, Smale has later stated Harriet is autistic because the character is based on her experiences, and she is autistic.

== Reception ==
Geek Girl received mixed reviews from critics.

Reviewers frequently discussed the story's writing, with Publishers Weekly highlighting the main character's "instantly appealing narrative voice, full of discursions and self-deprecation". While Kirkus Reviews appeared to appreciate the novel's "wacky humor and subtle girl-empowerment message", they found that the novel's "choppy writing and stereotyped characters" left the novel "a fluffy mess".

While multiple reviewers pointed to the story's clichés, they were received differently. According to Publishers Weekly, "If the ugly duckling turned swan is cliché, both Smale and Harriet know it." However, other reviewers found the story "overdone and unoriginal". Despite their favourable response the ugly duckling trope, Publishers Weekly stated that "other overfamiliar types [...] deflate the story’s fun somewhat".

Although the novel is marketed as young adult, multiple reviewers indicated it appeals to teenagers and younger audiences, with ages ranging from 10 to 15.

In 2014, Geek Girl won the Waterstones Children's Book Prize Teen category prize, along with the Leeds Book Award (11–14 category).

== Adaptation ==
In January 2023, Netflix gave a series order to adapt the novel into a 10-part television series, produced by Waterside Studios, Nelvana, RubyRock Pictures and Aircraft Pictures.

Awards
Preceded by Ketchup Clouds	Waterstones Children's Book Prize Teen Award; 2014	Succeeded by Half Bad
Preceded by Socks are not Enough	Leeds Book Awards (11-14 category); 2014	Succeeded by Smart (Kim Slater novel)
