= Knights Of =

London-based independent publishing house

- Type: Independent publishing house
- Industry: Publishing
- Genre: Inclusive children's literature
- Founded: 2017
- Founders: Aimée Felone; David Stevens
- Headquarters: London, England, United Kingdom
- Key people: Aimée Felone; David Stevens
- Products: Children's books
- Website: knightsof.media

Knights Of, also known as Knights Of Media, is a London-based independent publishing house, specialising in publishing inclusive children's books.

== History ==
Knights Of was founded in 2017 by Aimée Felone and David Stevens, who previously worked for Scholastic. In 2018 the company set up a pop-up bookshop, #ReadTheOnePercent, on Coldharbour Lane in Brixton, and in 2019 they established a permanent bookshop, Round Table Books, in Brixton. In 2020 Knights Of and Jacaranda Books launched a crowdfunding appeal to try to assure their survival in the face of the COVID-19 pandemic.

It won Children's Publisher of the Year 2022 at the British Book Awards.

== Authors published ==
Knights Of authors include the BAME writers Jason Reynolds and Sharna Jackson and deaf author Samantha Baines. In 2020 Knights Of published A Kind of Spark, the debut novel of Elle McNicoll, a Scottish children's writer; the book's plot follows the efforts of an eleven-year-old autistic narrator, Addie.
