= Pandemonia =

Character used in performance art

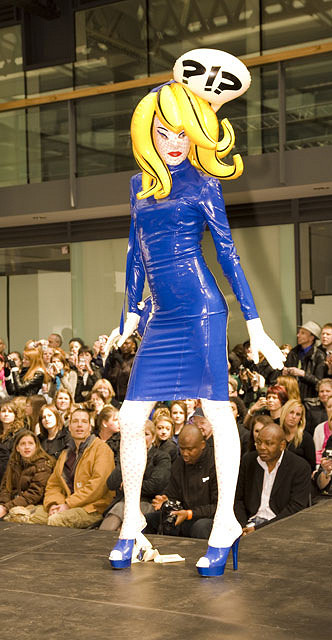
- Movement: Post PoP-Art
- Website: pandemonia.art

Pandemonia is a character and persona created as conceptual art by an anonymous London-based artist that has appeared in the art and fashion world since 2009. Clad in a latex full-head mask with stylized hair and latex dresses, Pandemonia is seven feet tall and was described by Katia Ganfield of Vice as "Roy Lichtenstein's blonde caricatures ... brought to life as a 7 ft Jeff Koons inflatable". She is often accompanied by an inflatable white dog named Snowy.

Pandemonia told Stylist:

Back in 2008 the newspapers were full of celebrities. I was drawn towards creating art that documented our time. It seemed evident to me that the best way to parody this world would be to create my very own celebrity. I created a truly artificial one, in the spirit of consumerist values. Slim, tall, glossy, forever young and, of course, famous.

Initially a "crasher" at fashion and social events, Pandemonia eventually became a London Fashion Week VIP guest.

Pandemonia is a critical reflection and, as such, an intervention upon ideas of celebrity and femininity. She is a pointed manifestation of how these ideas intersect with mass media, social media, and the marketability of desire. The art of Pandemonia herself is that of a constructed figure placed in the landscape of media, fashion and art events that has instigated the media response by feeding back to the media its own language, imagery and ideals.

When I pop up in celebrity circles I can see the mechanism of fame from both the inside and outside. Just as celebrities presented their image to the public, I present the celebrities my image. At least I know I'm acting out celebrity. My dog, Snowy, breaks the ice. People relate to him. Funny how people relate to an inflatable dog, isn't it?

— Pandemonia,

The growth of Pandemonia's celebrity is one of the themes in her art, which also explores archetypes of pop myth and reality.

Pandemonia's art is considered cross-media (sculpture, digital art, photography, and performance) and cross-generational due to the connection between early Pop Art and current pop culture.

In 2016, Pandemonia was chosen by Camper as the protagonist and muse for its Kobarah shoe style, and has been featured in stores and billboards in several major cities including Paris, London, New York, and Tokyo.
