= Holly Smale =

British writer (born 1981)

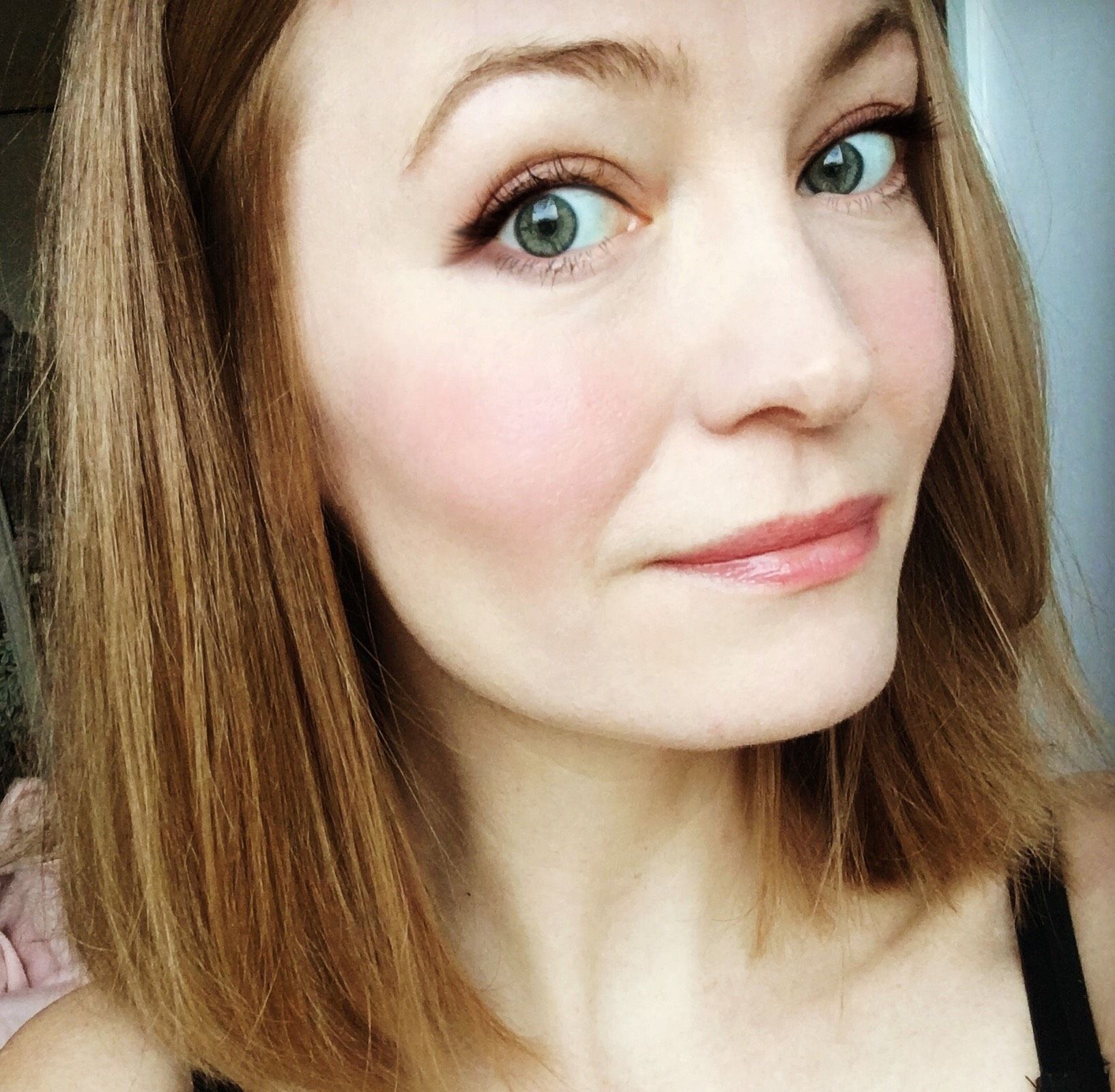
- Born: Holly Miranda Smale; 7 December 1981 (age 44); England, UK
- Education: University of Bristol
- Occupation: Writer
- Writing career
- Genre: Young-adult novels
- Notable work: Geek Girl series
- Notable awards: Waterstones Children's Book Prize 2014; Roald Dahl Funny Prize 2013

Holly Miranda Smale (born 7 December 1981) is a British writer. She wrote the Geek Girl series for young adults. The first book in the Geek Girl series won the 2014 Waterstones Children's Book Prize and was shortlisted for the Roald Dahl Funny Prize 2013. The final book, Forever Geek, was published by HarperCollins in March 2017.

Her first adult novel, The Cassandra Complex (UK) / Cassandra in Reverse (US) was the June 2023 pick for Reese's Book Club and a pick for the BBC Radio 2 Book club.

== Personal life ==
Holly Miranda Smale was born on 7 December 1981 in Hertfordshire, England. From an early age she loved reading and writing, and has stated that her childhood experiences of being bullied have influenced the subjects she chooses to write about. At the age of 15, Smale was recruited by a London modelling agency and became a fashion model. She modelled for two years but has stated in interviews that she did not enjoy it.

Smale attended Dame Alice Owen's before studying at the University of Bristol, and graduating with a Bachelor of Arts in English Literature and a Master of Arts in Shakespeare studies. At Bristol, Smale was a deputy editor of Epigram newspaper. She has held various jobs, including teaching English in Japan, and has travelled extensively.

Smale learned she was autistic at the age of 39 and subsequently was diagnosed with developmental coordination disorder. She has also mentioned having synesthesia, which in her case involves processing emotions as colours, dyscalculia, hyperlexia, coeliac disease and endometriosis. She identifies as a feminist.

== Geek Girl series ==
Originally meant to be a trilogy, the Geek Girl series consists of six books. The humorous fiction follows the life of Harriet Manners, a nerdy 15-year-old girl who tries out modelling to "reinvent herself". Following her own diagnoses of autism and dyspraxia after the series concluded, Smale has retroactively described Harriet as having both conditions as well.

The first book in the series, Geek Girl, received favourable reviews and was the Number 1 debut teen fiction book of 2013 in the UK. It won the 2014 Waterstones' Children's Book Prize in the young adult category. It also received the 2014 Leeds Book Award in the ages 11–14 category. and was shortlisted for the Roald Dahl Funny Prize 2013, the Queen of Teen award 2014 and the Branford Boase Award 2014.

- 2013 Geek Girl
- 2013 Model Misfit
- 2014 Picture Perfect
- 2015 All That Glitters
- 2016 Head Over Heels
- 2017 Forever Geek

For World Book Day (UK and Ireland) 2015, Smale also wrote an extra spin-off book titled Geek Drama set between Model Misfit and Picture Perfect. Also, a Christmas special not part of the main series titled All Wrapped Up was published in 2015, and a summer special titled Sunny Side Up was published in 2016.

A television adaptation was created for Netflix.

== The Valentines ==
In February 2019 Smale published Happy Girl Lucky, the first in a new series called The Valentines, about three sisters and a brother.

- 2019 Happy Girl Lucky
- 2020 Far From Perfect
- 2021 Love Me Not

== The Cassandra Complex/Cassandra In Reverse ==
The Cassandra Complex, an adult novel with an autistic woman as protagonist, was published in May 2023 in the UK. It was chosen as a BBC Radio 2 Book Club pick. Its US title, Cassandra In Reverse, was chosen as the June 2023 pick for Reese's Book Club and a June pick for Aardvark Book Club.
