= Samantha Baines =

English actress and comedian

- Born: Samantha Louise Baines; 1987 (age 38–39); Southwark, London, England
- Education: Central School of Speech and Drama; Exeter University
- Occupations: Comedian; actress, author; podcaster
- Awards: What the Frock! Best Newcomer 2015, Best Actress Award in 24 Hour Film Race, Coventry Inspiration Award 2021, International Women's Podcast Awards 2022
- Website: samanthabaines.com

Samantha Louise Baines (born 1987) is a deaf English actress, author and comedian. She is best known for her appearances in Magic Mike Live London, The Crown (Netflix), Lee Nelson's Well Funny People (BBC Three), Hank Zipzer (CBBC) and A Royal Night Out. She is a professional speaker.

== Early life ==
Baines grew up in Bromley, where she attended Newstead Wood School for Girls. She was a member of the National Youth Theatre. She studied drama at Exeter University and trained in acting at the Central School of Speech and Drama.

== Personal life ==
Baines was briefly married and divorced in 2020. She set up her own podcast about divorce to help others going through it called The Divorce Social (previously The Divorce Club). Famous podcast guests include Rose McGowan, Sarah Millican, Karen Hauer, Helen Lederer, Carl Donnelly, Shappi Khorsandi and Kerry Howard.

Samantha discovered she was deaf, age 29 and now wears hearing aids.

== Career ==
From 2010 to 2014, Baines was a member of all female sketch group Vinegar (formerly known as Vinegar Knickers), alongside Harriet Fisher and Katie Burnetts. Vinegar were finalists in the NATYS 2014. Vinegar took two comedy sketch shows to the Edinburgh Fringe in 2011 and 2012, and received four and five star reviews.

In 2011, Baines played Clarissa Ankle in the online gaming sensation Behind the Bytes, a sitcom based on the world of video games. The character of Clarissa Ankle proved so popular that she had her own spin-off series, Bytes Breaks.

In 2013, Baines played posh chav Steph, in Lee Nelson's Well Funny People (BBC Three) (for which she also voiced Sexy Woman), and receptionist Susan in Hank Zipzer (CBBC).

Baines took the lead role of Kate in the play Blueprint (by Corinne Furness) in 2013, which she reprised in 2014 at the BikeShed Theatre. The role was an emotional look at the life of a woman dying of Leukaemia, for which Baines received positive reviews. Belinda Dillon of Exeunt Magazine stated that the role was "superbly played", and the festival publication Wildfire said, "Samantha Baines takes the lead, giving a performance of amazing honesty and courage, which compels the audience to take her to their hearts".

She performed her first spot at The Comedy Store in London in 2015.

In 2015, Baines starred as Mary in UK cinema release A Royal Night Out, directed by Julian Jarrold for Lionsgate and Ecosse Films. Baines plays Mary in The Crown also directed by Julian Jarrold.

Baines writes comedy posts for the Huffington Post Comedy and Time Out. She also creates her own comic poetry which she posts via her personal blog and which she published as a book, Poentry: silly po-faced entries.

Baines took the role of the Female MC in Magic Mike Live London at the Hippodrome Casino in London's West End in 2018 until 2020, originating the role for the London show and collaborating with Channing Tatum on the script. Magic Mike Live London is a show based on the Magic Mike film franchise and is directed by Channing Tatum, it is featured in the film Magic Mike's Last Dance. WhatsOnStage stated Baines was "out and out hilarious", whilst The Independent commented on her "winning stage presence" in the role.

In 2025, Samantha launched her brand Baines London.

== Books ==
=== Harriet Versus the Galaxy ===
In October 2019 her debut children's novel Harriet Versus the Galaxy was published by Knights Of, a book about a girl who wears a hearing aid (as does Baines). The book was reviewed in The Independent: "with a hilarious heroine, this is a rip-roaring riot" and named one of the 'Best Children's Books of the year' by the paper. It was also selected as a BookTrust 'Book of the Month' and a Teachers pick on Amazon. Harriet Versus the Galaxy is also available on Audible also voiced by Baines.

=== The Night the Moon Went Out ===
Her second children's book The Night the Moon Went Out was published by Bloomsbury Publishing and is a short chapter book to encourage children to read independently. It was shortlisted for The People's Book Prize and longlisted for The Adrien Prize.

=== Living with Hearing Loss and Deafness: A guide to owning it and loving it ===
Her debut non-fiction title Living with Hearing Loss and Deafness: a guide to owning it and loving it was published by Headline in April 2023. It was an Amazon bestseller and Adam Kay called it "highly informative, told with warmth and humour".

Her new children’s book series will be published in 2027.

== Radio/podcasts ==
In 2014, Baines co-hosted the show Ladies What Brunch on Hoxton Radio, with comedian Helen Sorren. Baines and Sorren starred in the "Busy Battle" sketch by production company Rubber Public, which went viral. From 2014 to 2015 Baines also hosted her own solo show on Wandsworth Radio as well as the popular Week on the Web segment for Soho Radio. From 2015 onwards she appeared on various radio shows reporting the alternative news, doing the paper review and offering her opinions – shows include Woman's Hour on Radio 4, XFM, BBC r5 Live, BBC Radio Wales, BBC Radio Ulster, Absolute Radio and BBC Radio London. Baines hosted her own show Baines Plus One on Hoxton Radio which was also available as a podcast on iTunes. Baines' started a new podcast in 2018 called Periods: Amazing Women in History.

Baines began presenting on BBC Radio London in 2017 and BBC Radio Kent in 2018.

After her own divorce, Baines created and began hosting a new podcast: The Divorce Social (previously The Divorce Club). Guests include Sarah Millican, Rose McGowan, Karen Hauer, Jacqui Smith and the podcast has been featured on Loose Women and chosen as The Times' Podcast of the Week. The podcast has also won two awards.

== Recognitions ==
As host and creator of The Divorce Social podcast (previously The Divorce Club) Samantha won the 'Moment of Touching Honesty' Award at the International Women's Podcast Awards 2022 and the bronze award for 'Best Relationships Podcast' at the British Podcast Awards 2022. The podcast was also shortlisted for both awards in 2021. Her family podcast Silly News was longlisted in the British Podcast Awards 2026.

Samantha's debut children's novel Harriet Versus the Galaxy won the Coventry Inspiration Award 2021 and her second book The Night the Moon Went Out was longlisted for The Adrien Prize 2022.

Samantha won the What the Frock! Best Newcomer Award in 2015. One year into her stand-up comedy career, Baines was a finalist in the Funny Women Awards 2014, as well as a semi-finalist in the Laughing Horse New Act Competition 2014. Baines was the first woman to appear in the UK Pun Championship Final 2017 and also appeared in the final in 2018.

She also won a Best Actress Award in the 24 Hour Film Race for the short film New Model.

Samantha was a finalist in the All4inclusion Awards 2026. She was chosen as a Deaf Role Model by Deaf Unity and included as part of the Deaf Mosaic photography exhibition at the House of Common's.

Samantha is also a BAFTA member and a governor for the Royal Central School of Speech and Drama, where she originally trained.

== Filmography/TV appearances ==
Year	Title	Character	Production	Notes
2013	Lee Nelson's Well Funny People	Steph	BBC	Episode 3
2013	Lee Nelson's Well Funny People	Sexy Woman (voice)	BBC	Episode 2
2014	Hank Zipzer	Receptionist	CBBC	Episode 8
2015	A Royal Night Out	Mary	Lionsgate and Ecosse Films	UK cinema release: 15 May 2015
2015	Doctors	Harriet Bryson	BBC	Episode 110
2015	The 95th	Leader of the Refugees		Post-production
2016	Call the Midwife	Dot	BBC	Series 5, Episode 4
2016	Sunny D	Janet	BBC	Series 1 (3 episodes)
2016	The Crown	Mary	Netflix	Series 1
2017	Pop Sludge	Various	4Music	Series 1, Pilot
2017	Bucket	Miranda	BBC	Series 1, Episode 1
2018	Silent Witness	Gemma King	BBC	Series 21 "Moment Of Surrender" (2 episodes)
2018	This Week	Guest (self)	BBC	Episode 13 December 2018
2019	ITV News	Guest (self)	ITV1	Air date August 2019
2021	The Clash	Guest (self)	GB News	Air date October 2021
2022	Loose Women	Guest (self)	ITV1	Series 26, Episode 160
2023	ITV News	Guest (self)	ITV1	Air date March 2023
2023	Changing Ends	Fiona	ITVX	Series 1, Episode 4
2024	Avoidance	Kirsty	BBC	
2026	Father Brown	Bonnie Baldridge	BBC	
