= A Kind of Spark =

2020 middle-grade novel by Elle McNicoll

- Author: Elle McNicoll
- Language: English
- Genre: Middle grade fiction
- Publisher: Knights Of Media / Crown Books for Young Readers
- Publication date: 4 June 2020
- Publication place: Scotland
- Media type: Print (hardcover and paperback), Audiobook
- Pages: 192
- ISBN: 9780593374252
- OCLC: 1273556124

A Kind of Spark is a middle grade novel by Elle McNicoll, published on 4 June 2020, by Knights of Media. The book follows Addie, "an autistic 11-year-old [who] seeks to memorialize the women once tried as witches in her Scottish village." The book was commissioned as a 2023 CBBC television adaptation, with McNicoll acting as head writer for the series.

== Reception ==
A Kind of Spark was generally well-received, including a starred review from School Library Journal.

Kirkus Reviews called the book "[e]arnest and perceptive", noting, "the bullying Addie endures will leave readers’ stomachs in sympathetic knots, but Addie's nuanced relationships with her sisters and a new friend, Audrey, infuse humor and heart."

Publishers Weekly applauded the representation of Addie's autism, stating, "McNicoll, herself neurodivergent, portrays with clarity Addie’s neurological reality, interpersonal bonds, and thoughtful reflections." Deborah Stevenson, writing for The Bulletin of the Center for Children's Books, echoed the sentiment, writing, "McNicoll ... writes Addie’s narration with power and determination; it’s especially strong at revealing the sheer labor required for Addie to negotiate the world ... and the toll it takes, which is evident in Keedie as well." Stevenson concluded, "Whether they’re facing similar neurodivergent challenges or not, readers will appreciate Addie’s honesty, and they may follow her lead in reconsidering history."

Awards for A Kind of Spark
Year	Award	Category	Result	Ref
2020	Blackwell's Book of the Year	—	Won	
2021	Blue Peter Book Award	Best Story	Won	
2021	Waterstones Children's Book Prize	Overall	Won	
2021	Waterstones Children's Book Prize	Younger Readers	Won	
2021	Saltire Society Literary Award	First Book of the Year	Nominated	
2022	Schneider Family Book Award	Middle Grades	Honoree	

== Television series ==
A Kind of Spark was optioned for a CBBC television adaptation, with McNicoll acting as head writer for the series. It premiered in the UK on 31 March 2023, first on BBC iPlayer and later on CBBC.
