= Lexi Minetree =

American actress

- Education: University of Southern California
- Occupation: Actress
- Years active: 2023–present

Lexi Minetree (/ˈmɪnɪtriː/ MIN-ih-tree) is an American actress. She plays Elle Woods in the Prime Video comedy series Elle (2026).

== Early life ==
Minetree grew up in the suburbs of Atlanta, Georgia as the oldest child; both her mother and stepfather are accountants. She attended the University of Southern California, where she was a member of Kappa Alpha Theta and double majored in theater and public relations.

== Career ==
Her early screen work included Law & Order: SVU and in television films such as The Murdaugh Murders, Crowdsource Murder, and The Paramedic Who Stalked Me.

In February 2025, she was cast as a young Elle Woods in Elle, a television prequel to Legally Blonde (2001), of the character in high school. Minetree booked the role by filming her own version of Elle Wood's Harvard admission essay as her audition. Principal photography began on April 2, 2025 with first-look images of Minetree in costume released shortly afterwards and the series premiering on 1 July 2026. Elle is executive produced by Reese Witherspoon's production company Hello Sunshine.

On film, Minetree portrayed Regina in the 2025 horror-thriller film All Alone Together, directed by Maximus Jenkins. She is part of Osgood Perkins ensemble horror film The Young People.

== Filmography ==
Key
†	Denotes works that have not yet been released

Year	Title	Role	Notes
2024	Law & Order: SVU	Elodie	1 episode
2026	Elle	Elle Woods	Lead role
TBA	The Young People		Post-production
