= Jack Dishel =

American musician

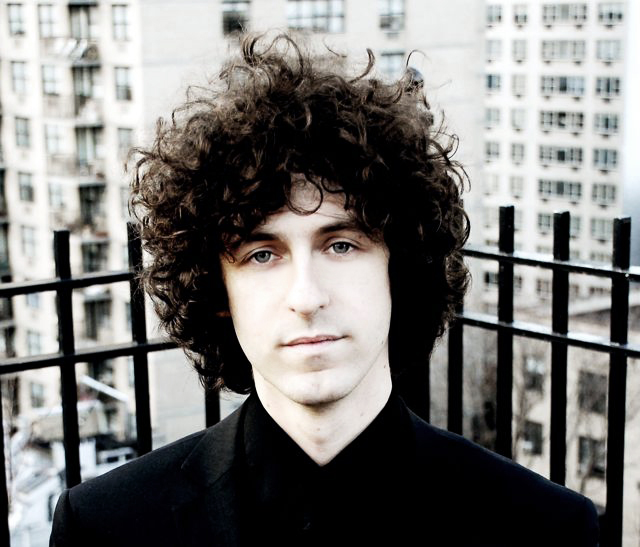
- Dishel in 2009
- Born: Yevgeny Leonidovich Dishel; 24 September 1976 (age 50); Soviet Union
- Citizenship: Russia; United States
- Occupations: Musician; actor; writer; director; comic; producer
- Years active: 2001–present
- Spouse: Regina Spektor (m. 2011)
- Children: 2
- Musical career
- Genres: Anti-folk; indie pop
- Instruments: Vocals; guitar; drums; bass; keyboards; percussion
- Formerly of: The Moldy Peaches
- Website: jackdishel.com

Jack Dishel (born Yevgeny Leonidovich Dishel, Russian: Евгений Леонидович Дишель; 24 September 1976) is a Russian-American musician, actor, writer, director, comic and producer. Born in the Soviet Union, he grew up in the US from the age of three. He releases and performs music under the band name Only Son and was previously the lead guitarist for the Moldy Peaches.

On 17 December 2015, Dishel launched his comedy web series :DRYVRS, starring Macaulay Culkin, which amassed over 6 million views on its first day of release and within its first week online had been viewed more than 20 million times. The five episodes of :DRYVRS have since amassed more than 50 million views across various social media platforms.

== Early life ==
Born Yevgeny Leonidovich Dishel to a Russian Jewish family in the Soviet Union, Jack moved to the United States as a three-year-old. He spent his early childhood in Queens, New York, before moving to Valley Stream at the age of nine. After graduating high school he attended SUNY Purchase College and subsequently moved to New York City to pursue music.

== :DRYVRS ==
:DRYVRS is an episodic comedy web-series created, written, directed by and starring Dishel. Macaulay Culkin appears in a recurring role as an unnamed, PTSD-riddled character who is reminiscent of Kevin McCallister from the Home Alone franchise. The pilot episode, "Just Me in the House By Myself", went viral on YouTube with over 6 million views on its first day of release and the number of views grew to 20 million in its first week online. Subsequent episodes featured Tom Petty, Rosanna Arquette, Darren Criss, Seth Green, Jeff Garlin, Steven Weber, Kevin Pollak, Rodney Mullen, Jakob Dylan, Dhani Harrison, and Nick Valensi of the Strokes. To date, the entirely self-produced series currently has over 50 million views between various social media platforms.

== Only Son ==
Since 2006, Jack Dishel has released three full length LPs under the name Only Son: The Drop to the Top (2006), Searchlight (2011), and the eponymous Only Son (2017). He has toured the world extensively opening for Regina Spektor and former Moldy Peaches bandmate Adam Green.

== Moldy Peaches ==
Dishel was the lead guitarist for indie-folk band Moldy Peaches, who rose to fame for their song "Anyone Else But You" from the Juno soundtrack. On their debut recording, released by Rough Trade Records on 11 September 2001, Dishel played guitar on "Nothing Came Out" and drums on both "Who's Got The Crack" and "Steak For Chicken". They later released a single for County Fair/Rainbows on which he plays lead guitar.

Known for their outlandish stage costumes and ironic sense of humor, Moldy Peaches were prominent members of New York City's anti-folk scene and achieved moderate success in the early 2000s supporting the Strokes on their first US tour. They subsequently headlined their own shows worldwide and took an "indefinite hiatus to pursue solo projects" in 2002. In 2008, six years after their unofficial breakup, the band rose to international prominence when the Juno soundtrack reached number 1 on the Billboard charts.

== Discography ==
As Only Son

- The Drop to the Top (2006)
- Searchlight (2011)
- Only Son (2017)

With the Moldy Peaches

- The Moldy Peaches (2001)
- Moldy Peaches 2000: Unreleased Cutz and Live Jamz 1994–2002 (2003)

== Other work ==
Dishel has appeared on albums by Regina Spektor, Kimya Dawson, Nickel Eye (solo project of Nikolai Fraiture from the Strokes) and Adam Green, with whom he wrote "Boss Inside" ('Minor Love' (Rough Trade 2010)). He was also the touring tenor guitarist for Los Angeles band Little Joy.

== Personal life ==
Dishel is married to fellow Soviet-born Jewish singer-songwriter Regina Spektor, with whom he has performed live and recorded music. Dishel and Spektor have two children together.

== Producer ==
In addition to co-producing the Only Son albums, Dishel has worked as a producer, arranger and co-writer for other artists, including Regina Spektor, Jarrod Gorbel, Adrien Reju and Toby Goodshank.
