= If I Were a Fish =

2023 single by Corook and Olivia Barton

Single by Corook featuring Olivia Barton
- B-side: "It's OK!"
- Released: April 21, 2023
- Genre: Acoustic; indie pop; folk
- Length: 2:21
- Label: Atlantic
- Songwriters: Corinne Savage; Olivia Barton
- Producers: Andrew Goldring; Corinne Savage

Corook singles chronology
"CGI" (2023)	"If I Were a Fish" (2023)

"If I Were a Fish" is a song by American singer-songwriters Corook and Olivia Barton, released on April 21, 2023. Prior to its release, the song became a viral hit on TikTok via a video of the artists performing the song on acoustic guitar, which reached over 16 million views by May 2023. Upon its official release by Atlantic Records, the song debuted on several Billboard charts, including Hot Rock & Alternative Songs and Digital Song Sales, and received airplay on BBC Radio 1.

== Background and composition ==
"I was having a very emotional day, feeling insecure and out of place. So I cried to Olivia and after feeling through it, we wrote this song in 10 minutes to remember the joy in being different. Happy Tuesday."

— Corook's caption on the original TikTok video.

Corook and Olivia Barton are Nashville-based singer-songwriters and romantic partners, who met in 2018 at Berklee College of Music. Prior to "If I Were a Fish", both Corook and Barton had established music careers: Corook had opened for K.Flay, JP Saxe, Jukebox the Ghost, and X Ambassadors and released their debut EP, Achoo! (2022), on Atlantic Records, while Barton had released two studio albums and toured with Illuminati Hotties and Enumclaw. Corook had also been active on TikTok, previously going viral with the song "It's OK!".

One day in early April 2023, Corook experienced a flood of negative online comments on a song they had posted. Corook had long felt excluded due to their colorful fashion sense, genre of music, and non-binary gender identity, and the negative comments had highlighted those feelings. As they later explained to The Boston Globe:

"It's not that the hate comments affected me, it was more that the hate comments were shining a light on something I was really thinking about in my life, which is I feel like I don't have a place. I just felt like I didn't really have any way to identify myself in any boxes I fit in and communities that felt like just mine."

To help console them, Barton suggested that she and Corook create a deliberately "weird" song to process these emotions. Corook responded with the idea that "if I were a fish, all of the things that make me different would be cool to people", which became the basis of the song. Corook and Barton wrote the initial version of the song in ten minutes and took an additional 10 to 15 minutes to film the original TikTok video.

Following the song's viral popularity, Corook and Barton spent a few days writing additional lyrics. Barton said, "What I loved about continuing to write it was that I really wanted to hold on to the energy it was created from. We finished writing it in the car and the shower and the night before the recording session. And it came from a pure place."

== Musical style and lyrics ==
"If I Were a Fish" is primarily built around acoustic guitar. Its sound has been compared to the protest folk of Woody Guthrie and to the Juno soundtrack, particularly "Anyone Else but You" by The Moldy Peaches. It is in the key of F major, with a vocal range of A_{3} to C_{5}, and is set in common time with a moderate tempo of around 90 beats per minute.

Lyrically, the song uses several metaphors to subtly illustrate themes of self-love, body positivity, queer acceptance, and embracing individuality. The verses each imagine how the singer would be admired as a fish ("Shimmerin' in the sun / Such a rare one, can't believe that you caught one...Heaviest in the sea / You'd win first prize if you caught me"), a rock ("skippiest on the lake / plop, plop, plop, I'm the perfect shape"), and a sock ("happiest as a pair / you found me, now I'm not scared"), while the chorus addresses Corook's experiences with online negativity ("Why is everybody on the Internet so mean? Why is everybody so afraid of what they've never seen?") with what Kamrin Baker of Good Good Good called "a thesis of radical acceptance and glee". Rolling Stone described the song as "a simple ditty about wishing to fit in" that started "an online movement about being proud of the things that make you unique."

Corook has described "If I Were a Fish" as a "self-acceptance, self-love kinda song" and being about "how cool it is to be different. Boxes don’t matter, and being yourself is the best.” Barton sees the song as exemplifying Corook's uniqueness, saying "I don’t know anybody [else] that would want to write this song, this way, this weird."

== TikTok virality ==
Corook and Barton posted a video of the song to Corook's TikTok account on April 11, 2023. The 50-second clip shows Corook, wearing a green frog-shaped bucket hat, and Barton performing the song's first verse and chorus at home while sitting and facing each other, both singing while Corook accompanies on acoustic guitar.

The video subsequently went viral on the platform, reaching 1 million views in two hours and 16 million by the following month. Various users made duet videos adding harmonies, dancing, lip-synching, drums, bass guitar, and even bluegrass banjo to the song. Other users posted covers of the song, including musician Chloe Moriondo, Broadway actor Kevin Chamberlin, and the Texas Girls' Choir; Corook duetted the latter video with the caption "This made me cry cause I could have used this song as a kid." Illustrator and Robby Novak collaborator Brad Montague created a hand-illustrated mini-music video for the song, and Hank Green, Elamin Abdelmahmoud, Dodie, Rina Sawayama, and Tori Kelly were among those who praised the song on TikTok and Twitter.

Speaking on the song's popularity, Corook said, "The kinds of videos people are making to the song and the kinds of the emotional reactions people are having and their feeling of connectedness with themselves and with each other has shown me [TikTok] is actually really special. It’s literally the fastest community builder. So as a musician, you have to be a part of it. But as a human, I want to be a part of it."

== Release and promotion ==
On April 14, Corook and Barton announced via TikTok that a full version of the song was forthcoming. This version was released as a single on April 21 via Atlantic Records. A music video, directed by Luke Harvey and showing Corook and Barton recording the song, was released the same day.

The following week, Corook held an impromptu singalong of the song at Washington Square Park; while they expected a small turnout, an estimated 300 people attended the performance. While on tour with Lizzy McAlpine, Barton played the song at an April 25 show at New York City's Brooklyn Steel venue, bringing Corook onstage to perform with her.

The song received international radio play on Mollie King's BBC Radio 1 show Future Pop as a "Top Pop Pick", and on Kate Bottley and Jason Mohammad's Good Morning Sunday program on BBC Radio 2.

== Reception ==
=== Commercial performance ===
Corook and Barton both made their Billboard chart debuts with the song, which premiered at No. 16 on Hot Alternative Songs, No. 19 on Hot Rock Songs, No. 22 on Hot Rock & Alternative Songs, No. 6 on Alternative Digital Song Sales, No.7 on Rock Digital Song Sales, and No. 36 on the all-genre Digital Song Sales, and reached 1.9 million official U.S. streams and 3,000 downloads in the April 21–27 tracking week according to Luminate.

=== Critical reception ===
Allie Gregory of Exclaim! chose the song as a Staff Pick, calling it "super catchy" and noting, "While its initial 50-second clip bordered on too-cute, the subsequently released full recording adds depth in its ensuing verses, switching up its imagery to skipping rocks that are the 'perfect shape' and coupled-up socks, spreading a subtle message of queer love and acceptance."

== Track listing ==
Digital single track listing
No.	Title	Writer(s)	Length
1.	"If I Were a Fish" (featuring Olivia Barton)	Corook, Olivia Barton	2:21
2.	"It's OK!"	Corook, Grant Averill	3:05
Total length:			5:28

== Charts ==
Chart performance for "If I Were a Fish"
Chart (2023)	Peak position
US Digital Song Sales (Billboard)	36
US Hot Rock & Alternative Songs (Billboard)	22
