= Critics' Choice Movie Award for Best Acting Ensemble =

Motion picture industry award

The Critics' Choice Movie Award for Best Acting Ensemble was one of the awards given to people working in the motion picture industry by the Broadcast Film Critics Association. It was eventually replaced by Best Casting and Ensemble in 2025.

== 2000s ==
Year	Movie	Cast members	Ref.
2001	Gosford Park	Michael Gambon, Kristin Scott Thomas, Camilla Rutherford, Maggie Smith, Charles Dance, Tom Hollander, Helen Mirren	
2001	Ocean's Eleven	George Clooney, Bernie Mac, Brad Pitt, Elliott Gould, Casey Affleck, Scott Caan, Eddie Jemison, Don Cheadle, Qin Shaobo, Carl Reiner, Matt Damon, Julia Roberts	
2001	The Royal Tenenbaums	Gene Hackman, Anjelica Huston, Ben Stiller, Gwyneth Paltrow, Luke Wilson, Kumar Pallana, Danny Glover, Owen Wilson	
2002	Chicago	Renée Zellweger, Catherine Zeta-Jones, Richard Gere, Queen Latifah, John C. Reilly, Lucy Liu, Taye Diggs	
2002	The Hours	Nicole Kidman, Stephen Dillane, George Loftus, Julianne Moore, John C. Reilly, Meryl Streep, Ed Harris, Claire Danes	
2002	My Big Fat Greek Wedding	Nia Vardalos, John Corbett, Lainie Kazan, Michael Constantine, Andrea Martin, Louis Mandylor, Gerry Mendicino, Joey Fatone, Gia Carides	
2003	The Lord of the Rings: The Return of the King	Elijah Wood, Viggo Mortensen, Sean Astin, Andy Serkis, Ian McKellen, John Rhys-Davies, Orlando Bloom, Billy Boyd, Dominic Monaghan	
2003	Love Actually	Emma Thompson, Hugh Grant, Alan Rickman, Liam Neeson, Martine McCutcheon, Colin Firth, Bill Nighy, Thomas Brodie-Sangster, Laura Linney, Andrew Lincoln	
2003	A Mighty Wind	Catherine O'Hara, Eugene Levy, Harry Shearer, Michael McKean, Christopher Guest, Jane Lynch, John Michael Higgins	
2003	Mystic River	Sean Penn, Tim Robbins, Kevin Bacon, Laurence Fishburne, Marcia Gay Harden, Jason Kelly, Cameron Bowen, Connor Paolo	
2004	Sideways	Paul Giamatti, Thomas Haden Church, Virginia Madsen, Sandra Oh, Marylouise Burke, Jessica Hecht	
2004	Closer	Julia Roberts, Jude Law, Natalie Portman, Clive Owen, Nick Hobbs, Colin Stinton	
2004	The Life Aquatic with Steve Zissou	Bill Murray, Owen Wilson, Cate Blanchett, Anjelica Huston, Willem Dafoe, Jeff Goldblum, Michael Gambon, Noah Taylor, Bud Cort	
2004	Ocean's Twelve	George Clooney, Brad Pitt, Matt Damon, Bernie Mac, Elliott Gould, Casey Affleck, Scott Caan, Eddie Jemison, Don Cheadle, Shaobo Qin, Carl Reiner, Julia Roberts	
2005	Crash	Don Cheadle, Sandra Bullock, Matt Dillon, Jennifer Esposito, Brendan Fraser, Terrence Howard, Chris "Ludacris" Bridges, Thandiwe Newton, Michael Peña, Ryan Phillippe	
2005	Good Night, and Good Luck	David Strathairn, Patricia Clarkson, George Clooney, Robert Downey Jr., Frank Langella, Jeff Daniels, Tate Donovan, Ray Wise	
2005	Rent	Anthony Rapp, Adam Pascal, Rosario Dawson, Jesse L. Martin, Wilson Jermaine Heredia, Idina Menzel, Tracie Thoms, Taye Diggs	
2005	Sin City	Bruce Willis, Mickey Rourke, Clive Owen, Jessica Alba, Rosario Dawson, Brittany Murphy, Josh Hartnett, Devon Aoki, Marley Shelton, Alexis Bledel, Nick Stahl, Jaime King	
2005	Syriana	George Clooney, Amr Waked, Christopher Plummer, Jeffrey Wright, Chris Cooper, Robert Foxworth, Nicky Henson, Nicholas Art, Matt Damon, Amanda Peet, Steven Hinkle, Daisy Tormé	
2006	Little Miss Sunshine	Greg Kinnear, Toni Collette, Steve Carell, Paul Dano, Abigail Breslin, Alan Arkin, Bryan Cranston, Beth Grant, Wallace Langham, Matt Winston	
2006	Babel	Brad Pitt, Cate Blanchett, Mohamed Akhzam, Peter Wight, Harriet Walter, Adriana Barraza, Gael García Bernal, Elle Fanning, Rinko Kikuchi, Koji Yakusho, Satoshi Nikaido	
2006	Bobby	Harry Belafonte, Joy Bryant, Nick Cannon, Emilio Estevez, Laurence Fishburne, Dave Fraunces, Jeridan Frye, Spencer Garrett, Brian Geraghty, Heather Graham, Anthony Hopkins, Helen Hunt	
2006	The Departed	Leonardo DiCaprio, Matt Damon, Jack Nicholson, Mark Wahlberg, Martin Sheen, Ray Winstone, Vera Farmiga, Alec Baldwin	
2006	Dreamgirls	Jamie Foxx, Beyoncé Knowles, Eddie Murphy, Danny Glover, Anika Noni Rose, Keith Robinson, Jennifer Hudson, Sharon Leal	
2006	A Prairie Home Companion	Garrison Keillor, Kevin Kline, Meryl Streep, Lily Tomlin, Lindsay Lohan, Woody Harrelson, John C. Reilly, Tommy Lee Jones, Virginia Madsen, Maya Rudolph	
2007	Hairspray	John Travolta, Michelle Pfeiffer, Queen Latifah, Nikki Blonsky, Amanda Bynes, Brittany Snow, Christopher Walken, James Marsden, Zac Efron, Elijah Kelley, Allison Janney	
2007	Before the Devil Knows You're Dead	Philip Seymour Hoffman, Ethan Hawke, Albert Finney, Marisa Tomei, Aleksa Palladino, Michael Shannon, Amy Ryan, Sarah Livingston	
2007	Gone Baby Gone	Casey Affleck, Michelle Monaghan, Morgan Freeman, Ed Harris, John Ashton, Amy Ryan, Madeline O'Brien, Amy Madigan	
2007	Juno	Elliot Page, Michael Cera, Jennifer Garner, Jason Bateman, Allison Janney, J. K. Simmons, Olivia Thirlby, Eileen Pedde, Rainn Wilson, Valerie Tian, Emily Perkins, Ashley Whillans	
2007	No Country for Old Men	Tommy Lee Jones, Javier Bardem, Josh Brolin, Woody Harrelson, Kelly Macdonald, Garret Dillahunt, Tess Harper, Barry Corbin, Stephen Root, Rodger Boyce	
2007	Sweeney Todd: The Demon Barber of Fleet Street	Johnny Depp, Helena Bonham Carter, Alan Rickman, Timothy Spall, Sacha Baron Cohen, Jamie Campbell Bower, Laura Michelle Kelly, Jayne Wisener, Ed Sanders, Anthony Head, Laura Meakin, Philip Philmar	
2008	Milk	Sean Penn, Emile Hirsch, Josh Brolin, Diego Luna, James Franco, Alison Pill, Victor Garber, Denis O'Hare, Joseph Cross, Brandon Boyce, Stephen Spinella, Lucas Grabeel	
2008	The Curious Case of Benjamin Button	Brad Pitt, Cate Blanchett, Elle Fanning, Taraji P. Henson, Julia Ormond, Jason Flemyng, Elias Koteas, Tilda Swinton, Mahershala Ali, Jared Harris	
2008	The Dark Knight	Christian Bale, Michael Caine, Heath Ledger, Gary Oldman, Aaron Eckhart, Maggie Gyllenhaal, Morgan Freeman	
2008	Doubt	Meryl Streep, Philip Seymour Hoffman, Amy Adams, Viola Davis, Joseph Foster	
2008	Rachel Getting Married	Anne Hathaway, Rosemarie DeWitt, Bill Irwin, Debra Winger, Tunde Adebimpe, Mather Zickel, Anna Deavere Smith, Anisa George, Beau Sia, Tamyra Gray, Sebastian Stan, Annaleigh Ashford	
2009	Inglourious Basterds	Brad Pitt, Mélanie Laurent, Christoph Waltz, Eli Roth, Michael Fassbender, Diane Kruger, Daniel Brühl, Til Schweiger, B. J. Novak, Gedeon Burkhard, Jacky Ido, Omar Doom, Samm Levine, August Diehl, Denis Ménochet, Sylvester Groth	
2009	Nine	Daniel Day-Lewis, Marion Cotillard, Nicole Kidman, Judi Dench, Kate Hudson, Sophia Loren, Fergie, Ricky Tognazzi	
2009	Precious	Gabourey Sidibe, Mo'Nique, Paula Patton, Mariah Carey, Sherri Shepherd, Lenny Kravitz, Nealla Gordon, Stephanie Andujar	
2009	Star Trek	Chris Pine, Zachary Quinto, Karl Urban, Zoe Saldaña, Simon Pegg, John Cho, Anton Yelchin, Eric Bana, Bruce Greenwood, Ben Cross, Winona Ryder, Clifton Collins Jr., Chris Hemsworth, Jennifer Morrison, Rachel Nichols, Faran Tahir	
2009	Up in the Air	George Clooney, Vera Farmiga, Anna Kendrick, Jason Bateman, Amy Morton, Melanie Lynskey, Danny McBride, Zach Galifianakis, J. K. Simmons, Sam Elliott	

== 2010s ==
Year	Movie	Cast members	Ref.
2010	The Fighter	Amy Adams, Christian Bale, Melissa Leo, Jack McGee, Mark Wahlberg	
2010	The Kids Are All Right	Julianne Moore, Annette Bening, Yaya DaCosta, Josh Hutcherson, Mark Ruffalo, Mia Wasikowska	
2010	The King's Speech	Helena Bonham Carter, Jennifer Ehle, Colin Firth, Michael Gambon, Derek Jacobi, Guy Pearce, Geoffrey Rush, Timothy Spall	
2010	The Social Network	Jesse Eisenberg, Andrew Garfield, Armie Hammer, Rooney Mara, Max Minghella, Justin Timberlake	
2010	The Town	Ben Affleck, Chris Cooper, Rebecca Hall, Jon Hamm, Blake Lively, Pete Postlethwaite, Jeremy Renner, Titus Welliver	
2011	The Help	Jessica Chastain, Viola Davis, Bryce Dallas Howard, Allison Janney, Chris Lowell, Ahna O'Reilly, Sissy Spacek, Octavia Spencer, Mary Steenburgen, Emma Stone, Cicely Tyson, Mike Vogel	
2011	The Artist	Bérénice Bejo, James Cromwell, Jean Dujardin, John Goodman, Penelope Ann Miller	
2011	Bridesmaids	Rose Byrne, Jill Clayburgh, Ellie Kemper, Melissa McCarthy, Wendi McLendon-Covey, Chris O'Dowd, Maya Rudolph, Kristen Wiig	
2011	The Descendants	Beau Bridges, George Clooney, Robert Forster, Judy Greer, Matthew Lillard, Shailene Woodley	
2011	The Ides of March	George Clooney, Paul Giamatti, Ryan Gosling, Philip Seymour Hoffman, Marisa Tomei, Evan Rachel Wood, Jeffrey Wright	
2012	Silver Linings Playbook	Jennifer Lawrence, Bradley Cooper, Robert De Niro, Anupam Kher, Chris Tucker, Jacki Weaver, Julia Stiles	
2012	Argo	Ben Affleck, Alan Arkin, Bryan Cranston, John Goodman	
2012	The Best Exotic Marigold Hotel	Judi Dench, Celia Imrie, Bill Nighy, Dev Patel, Ronald Pickup, Maggie Smith, Tom Wilkinson, Penelope Wilton	
2012	Les Misérables	Russell Crowe, Anne Hathaway, Hugh Jackman, Amanda Seyfried, Helena Bonham-Carter, Sacha Baron Cohen, Eddie Redmayne	
2012	Lincoln	Daniel Day-Lewis, Sally Field, Joseph Gordon-Levitt, Hal Holbrook, Tommy Lee Jones, James Spader, David Strathairn	
2012	Moonrise Kingdom	Bob Balaban, Frances McDormand, Bill Murray, Edward Norton, Jason Schwartzman, Tilda Swinton, Bruce Willis	
2013	American Hustle	Amy Adams, Christian Bale, Jennifer Lawrence, Louis C.K., Bradley Cooper, Jeremy Renner, Michael Peña	
2013	12 Years a Slave	Benedict Cumberbatch, Paul Dano, Chiwetel Ejiofor, Michael Fassbender, Paul Giamatti, Lupita Nyong'o, Sarah Paulson, Brad Pitt, Alfre Woodard	
2013	August: Osage County	Abigail Breslin, Chris Cooper, Benedict Cumberbatch, Juliette Lewis, Margo Martindale, Ewan McGregor, Dermot Mulroney, Julianne Nicholson, Julia Roberts, Sam Shepard, Meryl Streep, Misty Upham	
2013	The Butler	Mariah Carey, John Cusack, Jane Fonda, Cuba Gooding, Jr., Terrence Howard, Lenny Kravitz, James Marsden, David Oyelowo, Alex Pettyfer, Vanessa Redgrave, Alan Rickman, Liev Schreiber, Forest Whitaker, Robin Williams, Oprah Winfrey	
2013	Nebraska	Bruce Dern, Will Forte, Stacy Keach, Bob Odenkirk, June Squibb	
2013	The Wolf of Wall Street	Leonardo DiCaprio, Kyle Chandler, Jean Dujardin, Jon Favreau, Jonah Hill, Matthew McConaughey, Rob Reiner, Margot Robbie, Jon Bernthal	
2014	Birdman	Michael Keaton, Emma Stone, Edward Norton, Andrea Riseborough, Amy Ryan, Naomi Watts, Zach Galifianakis	
2014	Boyhood	Patricia Arquette, Ellar Coltrane, Ethan Hawke, Lorelei Linklater	
2014	The Grand Budapest Hotel	F. Murray Abraham, Mathieu Amalric, Adrien Brody, Willem Dafoe, Ralph Fiennes, Jeff Goldblum, Harvey Keitel, Jude Law, Bill Murray, Edward Norton, Tony Revolori, Saoirse Ronan, Jason Schwartzman, Léa Seydoux, Tilda Swinton, Tom Wilkinson, Owen Wilson	
2014	The Imitation Game	Matthew Beard, Benedict Cumberbatch, Charles Dance, Matthew Goode, Rory Kinnear, Keira Knightley, Allen Leech, Mark Strong	
2014	Into the Woods	Christine Baranski, Tammy Blanchard, Emily Blunt, James Corden, Lilla Crawford, Johnny Depp, Anna Kendrick, Daniel Huttlestone, Billy Magnussen, MacKenzie Mauzy, Chris Pine, Lucy Punch, Meryl Streep, Frances de la Tour, Tracey Ullman	
2014	Selma	Common, Carmen Ejogo, Cuba Gooding, Jr., David Oyelowo, Lorraine Toussaint, Giovanni Ribisi, Tim Roth, Henry G. Sanders, Martin Sheen, Tessa Thompson, Tom Wilkinson, Oprah Winfrey	
2015	Spotlight	Billy Crudup, Rachel McAdams, Brian d'Arcy James, Michael Keaton, Mark Ruffalo, Liev Schreiber, John Slattery, Stanley Tucci	
2015	The Big Short	Christian Bale, Steve Carell, Ryan Gosling, Melissa Leo, Hamish Linklater, John Magaro, Brad Pitt, Rafe Spall, Jeremy Strong, Marisa Tomei, Finn Wittrock	
2015	The Hateful Eight	Demián Bichir, Bruce Dern, Walton Goggins, Jennifer Jason Leigh, Samuel L. Jackson, Michael Madsen, Tim Roth, Kurt Russell, Channing Tatum	
2015	Straight Outta Compton	Neil Brown, Jr., Paul Giamatti, Corey Hawkins, Aldis Hodge, O'Shea Jackson, Jr., Jason Mitchell	
2015	Trumbo	Adewale Akinnuoye-Agbaje, Louis C.K., Bryan Cranston, David James Elliott, Elle Fanning, John Goodman, Diane Lane, Helen Mirren, Michael Stuhlbarg, Alan Tudyk	
2016	Moonlight	Mahershala Ali, Patrick Decile, Alex R. Hibbert, Naomie Harris, André Holland, Jharrel Jerome, Janelle Monáe, Jaden Piner, Trevante Rhodes, Ashton Sanders	
2016	20th Century Women	Annette Bening, Kirk Bovill, Darrell Britt-Gibson, Billy Crudup, Elle Fanning, Greta Gerwig, Thea Gill, Nathalie Love, Randy Ryan, Alia Shawkat, Laura Slade Wiggins, Waleed Zuaiter, Lucas Jade Zumann	
2016	Fences	Jovan Adepo, Viola Davis, Stephen McKinley Henderson, Russell Hornsby, Saniyya Sidney, Denzel Washington, Mykelti Williamson	
2016	Hell or High Water	Gil Birmingham, Jeff Bridges, Dale Dickey, Ben Foster, Marin Ireland, Katy Mixon, Melanie Papalia, Chris Pine, Kevin Rankin	
2016	Hidden Figures	Mahershala Ali, Kevin Costner, Kirsten Dunst, Rhoda Griffis, Taraji P. Henson, Aldis Hodge, Karan Kendrick, Janelle Monáe, Paige Nicollette, Jim Parsons, Glen Powell, Saniyya Sidney, Octavia Spencer, Gary Weeks	
2016	Manchester by the Sea	Casey Affleck, Matthew Broderick, Heather Burns, Kyle Chandler, Tate Donovan, Kara Hayward, Lucas Hedges, Gretchen Mol, Erica McDermott, Michelle Williams	
2017	Three Billboards Outside Ebbing, Missouri	Abbie Cornish, Peter Dinklage, Woody Harrelson, John Hawkes, Lucas Hedges, Željko Ivanek, Caleb Landry Jones, Frances McDormand, Clarke Peters, Sam Rockwell, Samara Weaving	
2017	Dunkirk	Kenneth Branagh, Tom Hardy, Cillian Murphy, Mark Rylance, Fionn Whitehead, Tom Glynn-Carney, Jack Lowden, Harry Styles, Aneurin Barnard, James D'Arcy, Barry Keoghan.	
2017	Lady Bird	Timothée Chalamet, Beanie Feldstein, Lucas Hedges, Tracy Letts, Stephen McKinley Henderson, Laurie Metcalf, Jordan Rodrigues, Saoirse Ronan, Odeya Rush, Marielle Scott, Lois Smith	
2017	Mudbound	Jonathan Banks, Mary J. Blige, Jason Clarke, Garrett Hedlund, Jason Mitchell, Rob Morgan, Carey Mulligan	
2017	The Post	Bruce Greenwood, Tom Hanks, Tracy Letts, Bob Odenkirk, Sarah Paulson, Matthew Rhys, Meryl Streep, Bradley Whitford	
2018	The Favourite	Joe Alwyn, Olivia Colman, Nicholas Hoult, Emma Stone, Rachel Weisz	
2018	Black Panther	Angela Bassett, Chadwick Boseman, Sterling K. Brown, Winston Duke, Martin Freeman, Danai Gurira, Michael B. Jordan, Daniel Kaluuya, Lupita Nyong'o, Andy Serkis, Forest Whitaker, Letitia Wright	
2018	Crazy Rich Asians	Awkwafina, Gemma Chan, Henry Golding, Ken Jeong, Lisa Lu, Harry Shum, Jr., Constance Wu, Michelle Yeoh	
2018	Vice	Amy Adams, Christian Bale, Steve Carell, LisaGay Hamilton, Justin Kirk, Eddie Marsan, Tyler Perry, Alison Pill, Jesse Plemons, Lily Rabe, Sam Rockwell	
2018	Widows	Viola Davis, Elizabeth Debicki, Robert Duvall, Cynthia Erivo, Colin Farrell, Brian Tyree Henry, Daniel Kaluuya, Liam Neeson, Michelle Rodriguez	
2019	The Irishman	Robert De Niro, Al Pacino, Joe Pesci, Ray Romano, Bobby Cannavale, Anna Paquin, Stephen Graham, Harvey Keitel, Kathrine Narducci, Stephanie Kurtzuba, Welker White, Jesse Plemons, Jack Huston, Domenick Lombardozzi, Paul Herman, Gary Basaraba, Marin Ireland, Aleksa Palladino, J. C. MacKenzie	
2019	Bombshell	Charlize Theron, Nicole Kidman, Margot Robbie, John Lithgow, Kate McKinnon, Connie Britton, Malcolm McDowell, Allison Janney, Rob Delaney, Mark Duplass, Alice Eve, Ashley Greene, Alanna Ubach, D'Arcy Carden	
2019	Knives Out	Ana de Armas, Toni Collette, Daniel Craig, Jamie Lee Curtis, Chris Evans, Don Johnson, Katherine Langford, Riki Lindhome, Jaeden Martell, Edi Patterson, Christopher Plummer, Noah Segan, Michael Shannon, Lakeith Stanfield	
2019	Little Women	Saoirse Ronan, Emma Watson, Florence Pugh, Eliza Scanlen, Laura Dern, Timothée Chalamet, Meryl Streep, Tracy Letts, Bob Odenkirk, James Norton, Louis Garrel, Chris Cooper, Jayne Houdyshell, Abby Quinn	
2019	Marriage Story	Scarlett Johansson, Adam Driver, Laura Dern, Alan Alda, Ray Liotta, Julie Hagerty, Merritt Wever, Mark O'Brien, Matthew Shear, Brooke Bloom, Kyle Bornheimer, Mickey Sumner, Wallace Shawn, Martha Kelly	
2019	Once Upon a Time in Hollywood	Leonardo DiCaprio, Brad Pitt, Margot Robbie, Emile Hirsch, Margaret Qualley, Timothy Olyphant, Austin Butler, Dakota Fanning, Bruce Dern, Al Pacino, Brenda Vaccaro, Nicholas Hammond, Samantha Robinson, Rafał Zawierucha, Lorenza Izzo, Costa Ronin, Damon Herriman, Lena Dunham, Madisen Beaty, Mikey Madison, Maya Hawke	
2019	Parasite	Jang Hye-jin, Jung Hyun-joon, Jung Ji-so, Lee Jung-eun, Song Kang-ho, Park Myung-hoon, Park So-dam, Lee Sun-kyun, Choi Woo-shik, Cho Yeo-jeong	

== 2020s ==
Year	Winners	Cast members	Ref.
2020	The Trial of the Chicago 7	Yahya Abdul-Mateen II, Sacha Baron Cohen, Joseph Gordon-Levitt, Michael Keaton, Frank Langella, John Carroll Lynch, Eddie Redmayne, Noah Robbins, Mark Rylance, Alex Sharp, Jeremy Strong, Ben Shenkman, Kelvin Harrison, Jr., John Doman, Daniel Flaherty, Caitlin FitzGerald, J. C. MacKenzie, Damian Young, Max Adler, C. J. Wilson	
2020	Da 5 Bloods	Delroy Lindo, Jonathan Majors, Clarke Peters, Norm Lewis, Isiah Whitlock, Jr., Mélanie Thierry, Paul Walter Hauser, Jasper Pääkkönen, Jean Reno, Chadwick Boseman (post-humous nomination), Veronica Ngo, Johnny Trí Nguyễn, Nguyễn Ngọc Lâm, Lê Y Lan, Sandy Hương Phạm	
2020	Judas and the Black Messiah	Daniel Kaluuya, Lakeith Stanfield, Jesse Plemons, Dominique Fishback, Ashton Sanders, Darrell Britt-Gibson, Lil Rel Howery, Algee Smith, Dominique Thorne, Martin Sheen, Amari Cheatom	
2020	Ma Rainey's Black Bottom	Viola Davis, Chadwick Boseman (post-humous nomination), Glynn Turman, Colman Domingo, Michael Potts, Jonny Coyne, Taylour Paige, Jeremy Shamos, Dusan Brown, Joshua Harto	
2020	Minari	Steven Yeun, Han Ye-ri, Alan Kim, Noel Kate Cho, Youn Yuh-jung, Will Patton, Scott Haze, Jacob Wade	
2020	One Night in Miami...	Kingsley Ben-Adir, Eli Goree, Aldis Hodge, Leslie Odom, Jr., Lance Reddick, Joaquina Kalukango, Michael Imperioli, Beau Bridges, Lawrence Gilliard, Jr., Nicolette Robinson	
2021	Belfast	Caitríona Balfe, Jamie Dornan, Judi Dench, Jude Hill, Ciarán Hinds, Colin Morgan	
2021	Don't Look Up	Cate Blanchett, Timothée Chalamet, Leonardo DiCaprio, Ariana Grande, Jonah Hill, Jennifer Lawrence, Melanie Lynskey, Scott Mescudi, Rob Morgan, Himesh Patel, Ron Perlman, Tyler Perry, Mark Rylance, Meryl Streep	
2021	The Harder They Fall	Jonathan Majors, Idris Elba, Zazie Beetz, Regina King, Delroy Lindo, Lakeith Stanfield, RJ Cyler, Danielle Deadwyler, Edi Gathegi, Deon Cole	
2021	Licorice Pizza	Alana Haim, Cooper Hoffman, Bradley Cooper, Sean Penn, Tom Waits, Benny Safdie, Skyler Gisondo, Mary Elizabeth Ellis	
2021	The Power of the Dog	Benedict Cumberbatch, Kirsten Dunst, Kodi Smit-McPhee, Jesse Plemons, Thomasin McKenzie, Keith Carradine, Genevieve Lemon, Frances Conroy, Peter Carroll	
2021	West Side Story	Rachel Zegler, Ansel Elgort, Ariana DeBose, David Alvarez, Mike Faist, Rita Moreno, Brian d'Arcy James, Corey Stoll, Ana Isabelle, Andréa Burns, Jamie Harris, Benjamin Cook, Kyle Allen, Myles Erlick, Talia Ryder, Maddie Ziegler	
2022	Glass Onion: A Knives Out Mystery	Daniel Craig, Edward Norton, Janelle Monáe, Kathryn Hahn, Leslie Odom, Jr., Kate Hudson, Dave Bautista, Jessica Henwick, Madelyn Cline, Noah Segan, Jackie Hoffman, Dallas Roberts, Ethan Hawke, Hugh Grant, Stephen Sondheim, Natasha Lyonne, Adam Davenport, Kareem Abdul-Jabbar, Serena Williams, Yo-Yo Ma, Angela Lansbury	
2022	The Banshees of Inisherin	Colin Farrell, Brendan Gleeson, Kerry Condon, Barry Keoghan, Pat Shortt, Gary Lydon, Jon Kenny, Aaron Monaghan, Bríd Ní Neachtain, Sheila Flitton	
2022	Everything Everywhere All at Once	Michelle Yeoh, Ke Huy Quan, Stephanie Hsu, James Hong, Jamie Lee Curtis, Jenny Slate, Harry Shum, Jr., Tallie Medel	
2022	The Fabelmans	Michelle Williams, Paul Dano, Seth Rogen, Gabriel LaBelle, Keely Karsten, Julia Butters, Judd Hirsch, Sophia Kopera, Jeannie Berlin, Robin Bartlett	
2022	The Woman King	Viola Davis, Thuso Mbedu, Lashana Lynch, Sheila Atim, Hero Fiennes Tiffin, John Boyega, Jimmy Odukoya, Masali Baduza, Jayme Lawson, Adrienne Warren	
2022	Women Talking	Rooney Mara, Claire Foy, Jessie Buckley, Judith Ivey, Ben Whishaw, Frances McDormand, Sheila McCarthy, Michelle McLeod, Kate Hallett, Liv McNeil, Emily Mitchell, Kira Guloien, Shayla Brown, August Winter	
2023	Oppenheimer	Cillian Murphy, Emily Blunt, Robert Downey Jr., Matt Damon, Josh Hartnett, Florence Pugh, Benny Safdie, David Krumholtz, Alden Ehrenreich, Rami Malek, Jason Clarke, Casey Affleck	
2023	Air	Matt Damon, Ben Affleck, Jason Bateman, Chris Messina, Matthew Maher, Marlon Wayans, Jay Mohr, Chris Tucker, Viola Davis, Gustaf Skarsgård	
2023	Barbie	Margot Robbie, Ryan Gosling, Will Ferrell, America Ferrera, Ariana Greenblatt, Kate McKinnon, Helen Mirren, Rhea Perlman, Issa Rae, Michael Cera, Dua Lipa, Simu Liu, John Cena, Emerald Fennell, Ncuti Gatwa, Emma Mackey, Kingsley Ben-Adir, Scott Evans	
2023	The Color Purple	Fantasia Barrino, Taraji P. Henson, Danielle Brooks, Colman Domingo, Corey Hawkins, Gabrielle Wilson, Halle Bailey, Aunjanue Ellis-Taylor, Jon Batiste, Louis Gossett Jr., David Alan Grier, Deon Cole, Tamela Mann, Elizabeth Marvel, Phylicia Pearl Mpasi, Ciara	
2023	The Holdovers	Paul Giamatti, Da'Vine Joy Randolph, Dominic Sessa, Carrie Preston, Gillian Vigman, Tate Donovan, Brady Hepner, Ian Dolley, Jim Kaplan, Michael Provost, Andrew Garman	
2023	Killers of the Flower Moon	Leonardo DiCaprio, Lily Gladstone, Robert De Niro, Jesse Plemons, Tantoo Cardinal, John Lithgow, Brendan Fraser, Cara Jade Myers	
2024	Conclave	Ralph Fiennes, Stanley Tucci, John Lithgow, Sergio Castellitto, Isabella Rossellini, Lucian Msamati, Carlos Diehz, Brían F. O'Byrne, Merab Ninidze, Thomas Loibl, Jacek Koman, Loris Loddi, Balkissa Maiga	
2024	Anora	Mikey Madison, Mark Eidelstein, Yura Borisov, Karren Karagulian, Vache Tovmasyan, Aleksei Serebryakov, Darya Ekamasova, Lindsey Normington, Ivy Wolk, Luna Sofia Miranda, Alena Gurevich, Sebastian Conelli, Ella Rubin	
2024	Emilia Pérez	Zoe Saldaña, Karla Sofía Gascón, Selena Gomez, Adriana Paz, Édgar Ramírez, Mark Ivanir	
2024	Saturday Night	Gabriel LaBelle, Rachel Sennott, Cory Michael Smith, Ella Hunt, Dylan O'Brien, Emily Fairn, Matt Wood, Lamorne Morris, Kim Matula, Finn Wolfhard, Nicholas Braun, Ellen Boscov, Cooper Hoffman, Andrew Barth Feldman, Leander Suleiman, Taylor Gray, Mcabe Gregg, Abraham Hsu, Corinne Britti, Nicholas Podany, Rowan Joseph, Kirsty Woodward, Kaia Gerber, Robert Wuhl, Drew Scheid, Tommy Dewey, Catherine Curtin, Jon Batiste, Brian Welch, Jef Holbrook, Willem Dafoe, Paul Rust, Tracy Letts, Matthew Rhys, Naomi McPherson, J. K. Simmons, Billy Bryk, Brad Garrett, Josh Brener	
2024	Sing Sing	Colman Domingo, Clarence Maclin, Sean San José, Paul Raci, David Giraudy, Patrick Griffin, Jon-Adrian Velazquez, Sean Johnson	
2024	Wicked	Cynthia Erivo, Ariana Grande, Jonathan Bailey, Ethan Slater, Bowen Yang, Marissa Bode, Peter Dinklage, Michelle Yeoh, Jeff Goldblum, Bronwyn James, Andy Nyman, Courtney-Mae Briggs, Keala Settle, Aaron Teoh, Sharon D. Clarke, Jenna Boyd, Colin Michael Carmichael, Karis Musongole, Cesily Collette Taylor	
