= Erica Schreiner =

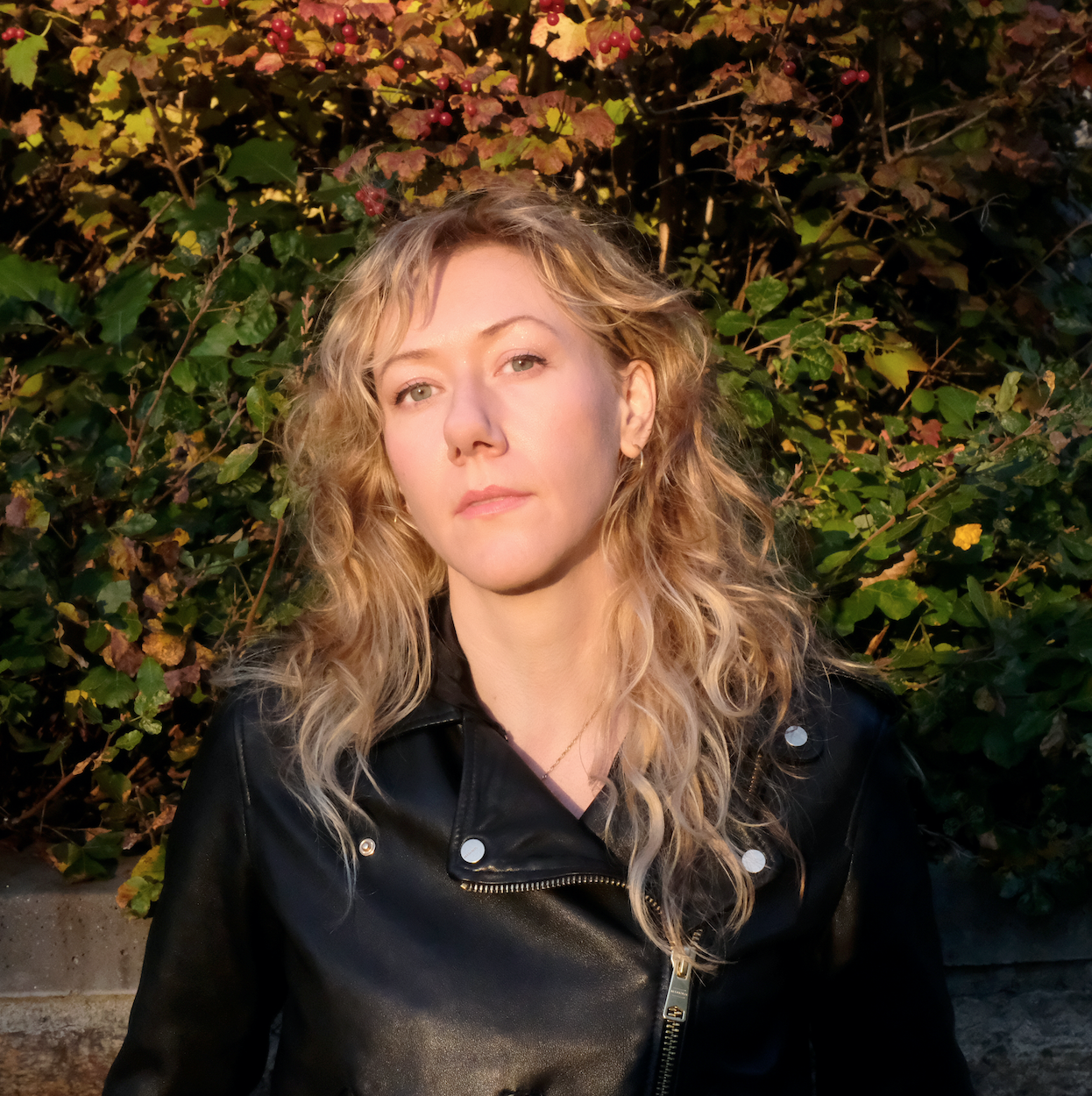
- Born: 1983 (age 42–43); Oregon, US
- Education: The Art Institute of Portland
- Occupations: Filmmaker, video artist, performance artist
- Website: https://ericaschreiner.com/

Erica Schreiner is an American experimental filmmaker, video artist, and performance artist.

== Biography ==
Schreiner was born in 1983 in Oregon. She earned a BS in graphic design from the Art Institute of Portland, and she was subsequently awarded a full scholarship to The School of Visual Arts Lens and Screen Arts Residency Program. She studied under Marina Abramović in 2012 for the MoMA PS1 program Summer School 2012, which also included Steve Paxton and Genesis Breyer P-Orridge. She cites among her influences Maya Deren, Andy Warhol, Cindy Sherman, surrealism, Riot Grrrl, and Czech New Wave.

== Career ==
Schreiner's first short Paper Dress appeared in late 2005, with Schreiner portraying the character of Skye. This soon led to a series The Skye Project in collaboration with director Christopher Tenzis. The films premiered on MySpace, and a total of 23 shorts were completed by 2008, augmented with a website that included blog entries that invited audience feedback and live performances.

Following The Skye Project, Schreiner continued to make short films, including the five-part Disorders Series in 2011 in which she personifies specific mental illnesses. Her 2023 short Love Is Power was acquired by MoMA in 2025 and screened along with her short film Birth (2022) as part of the series Queer And Uncensored, the film portion which she guest curated along with filmmaker MM Serra.

Her debut feature-length film Satori was released in 2015, with her second feature The Special People, which featured a performance from Matthew Silver, following in 2021.

Her films have been screened at The Museum of Modern Art, MoMA PS1, the Hugh Lane Gallery, the Bill Hodges Gallery, and Nick Knight’s SHOWstudio, among others.

She has also directed music videos for Toby Goodshank, Portland duo Soft Metals, Vyy, Zac Pennington of Parenthetical Girls’ project Popular Music, The Grasping Straws, The Johns, and others.

Schreiner will begin shooting an upcoming feature in August 2026 called The Art Commune, co-directed with Brewce Longo.

Schreiner is on the Programming Committee for the Millennium Film Workshop and currently sits on the Board Of Advisors for the The Film-Makers' Cooperative.

== Artistry ==
"Schreiner’s work looks and feels like no one else’s; you always know when you are watching an Erica Schreiner video, and in this sense she is the definition of a true auteur." - Matt McKinzie, The Film-Makers' Cooperative

SHOWstudio calls Schreiner "a Millenial Maya Deren" and describes her feature Satori as "mus[ing] on the commodification of art, the need for financial survival and the value of personal belongings." Of her work, Schreiner says she "invent[s] worlds that are ethereal, sensual and ritualistic" while "urg[ing] the viewer to consider alternate realities from the current cultural paradigm and to locate peace within a technologically inundated and capitalistic/patriarchal culture." She films on VHS as her primary medium. Schreiner cites among her influences Maya Deren, Andy Warhol, Cindy Sherman, surrealism, Riot Grrrl, and Czech New Wave.

== Solo exhibitions ==
2011

- Dessert & Disorders | The Disorders Series (2011), Bill Hodges Gallery, Manhattan, New York

2015

- MOONSEED, Eckhaus Gallery, Kutztown, PA

2023

- Erica Schreiner: Feminine Transgressions, Bill Hodges Gallery, Manhattan, New York

2024

- God is Woman, New Gallery, Brooklyn, New York
- Sensory Archive, Xposed on the Highline, Manhattan High Line, Manhattan, New York

2025

- A Girl In Her Own World, co-curated with Matt McKinzie, The Film-Makers' Cooperative, Manhattan, New York

2026

- Of Living Deliciously, Lola Gallery, Los Angeles, CA

== Selected group exhibitions ==
2008

- NW Film and Video Festival, Portland Art Museum, Portland, OR

2010

- Un-Interrupted, exhibition with Sol Kjøk, Bill Hodges Gallery, Manhattan, New York
- ArcheTime Film Festival, The Elizabeth Foundation for the Arts, Manhattan, New York

2012

- Performance and exhibition with Marina Abramović, MoMA PS1, Queens, New York
- Fashion/Fetish, SHOWstudio, London, England, United Kingdom

2020

- ULTRAcinema Film Festival, Mexico City, Mexico
- Essex DocFest, Essex, England, United Kingdom, Official Selection: Quarantine Films
- Berlin Underground Film Festival, Berlin, Germany, Nomination: Best Performance Art Film
- Bump’n’Grind Film Festival, Toronto, Ontario, Canada, Award: Best Performance in an Art Film

2021

- The Film and Video Poetry Society, Pasadena, CA, Official Selection: The 2021 Film and Video Poetry Symposium
- G Independent Film Festival, Melbourne, Australia

2022

- Experimental Film & Video, CICA Museum, Gimpo, South Korea

2023

- International Experimental Film and Video Festival, Bideodromo, Bilbao, Spain
- I’ll Be Your Mirror, Hugh Lane Gallery, Dublin, Ireland

2025

- Queer + Uncensored, Museum of Modern Art, Manhattan, New York
- Bogota Experimental Film Festival, CineAutopsia, Bogotá, Colombia
- Hungarian Experimental Film Festival, Kaleideszkop Haz, Esztergom, Hungary
- EMAMI Art Experimental Film Festival, Kolkata, India, Official Selection: International

2026

- Long Live the Underground!, Museum of Modern Art, Manhattan, New York
- Chicago Underground Film Festival, Gene Siskel Film Center and Harper Theater, Chicago, Illinois
- PerSo Perugia Social Film Festival, Perugia, Italy
- FENDA Experimental Festival, Belo Horizonte, Brazil

== Filmography ==
=== Films ===
Year	Title	Notes
2015	Satori	
2021	The Special People	
TBA	The Art Commune	In production; co-director Brewce Longo

=== Short films ===
Year	Title	Notes
2005	Paper Dress	The Skye Project
2006	Chocolate Bunny	The Skye Project
2006	Sick	The Skye Project
2006	Genetically Altered	The Skye Project
2006	Song	The Skye Project
2006	Home	The Skye Project
2006	New Friend	The Skye Project
2006	Cake	The Skye Project
2006	Birthday	The Skye Project
2007	The Light Game	
2007	Stencil	
2007	Strawberry Milk	
2007	Math	The Skye Project
2007	House Sitting	The Skye Project
2007	Performance	The Skye Project
2007	Gift	The Skye Project
2008	Paper Cup	
2008	Ohio	
2008	Sauce	
2008	Lover	
2008	Thistle	
2008	'Tis The Season	The Skye Project, director Chris Tenzis
2008	Red Rover	The Skye Project
2008	Vegging Out	The Skye Project
2008	Alice	The Skye Project
2008	Families	The Skye Project
2008	Call	The Skye Project
2008	Light-Up Shoes	The Skye Project
2008	President	The Skye Project
2009	Ballerina	
2009	Sunbeam	
2009	Your Poverty	
2009	Sleepy Girl	
2010	Wonder	
2010	Pulp	
2010	Anne	
2010	Dance	
2011	Erase	The Disorders Series
2011	Evidence	The Disorders Series
2011	Smolder	The Disorders Series
2011	Nectar	The Disorders Series
2011	Echo	The Disorders Series
2012	Debris	
2012	Mirror, Mirror, Mirror	
2012	Metamorphisis	
2013	Suspension	
2013	Dear God,	
2013	Fractured: Parts 1 - 7	SHOWstudio
2013	Jam	SHOWstudio
2013	The Tale of the Bravest Warrior	SHOWstudio
2014	Dirty Pictures	
2014	30	
2015	Let	
2015	Arrows	
2015	Untitled	
2015	MOONSEED	
2016	Learning	
2016	One Awareness	
2016	The Special People	
2016	Artist Video Portrait Series	44 videos of 1 min. in length each
2016	Alchemy	
2016	Unopened Opened	
2016	Yoke	
2017	The Plastic Sea	
2017	All The King's Horses	
2017	Bleed	
2017	Sometime	
2017	Wish	
2018	Soft	
2018	God Never Gives You More Than You Can Handle	
2018	Arrangement in Blue and Gold No.1	
2018	Secret	
2018	Contaminate	
2019	Come	
2020	BYE DAD	
2020	Tomorrow	
2020	Recess	
2020	Q/U/A/R/I/N/T/I/N/E	
2022	Blue Transcendence	
2022	Birth	
2023	Archipelago	
2023	Love Is Power	
2023	The Empress	The Tarot Project
2023	The High Priestess	The Tarot Project
2023	The Magician	The Tarot Project
2023	The Fool	The Tarot Project
2024	Photosynthesis	
2024	Held	
2024	Art for Heartbreak	
2024	Goodbye: A Ritual	
2024	Hold	
2025	Smoke	
2026	Providence	
2026	The Escape	

=== Music videos ===
Year	Artist	Title
2008	Prussia	"Painting Over You and Me"
2011	Soft Metals	"Psychic Driving"
2011	JF Robitaille	"When We Say Goodbye"
2013	Soft Metals	"On A Cloud"
2014	Soft Metals	"No Turning Back"
2017	Vyy	"Ardorous Gyre"
2017	Feirro Ex Machina	"Annealing the Unprecious Ore"
2018	The Johns	"Blood Run Free"
2020	The Grasping Straws	"Help"
2020	The Johns	"Wistful: Parts 1+2"
2021	Toby Goodshank	"Tara"
2021	Popular Music	"Somewhere"
2023	Lloyd Daylight	"Stargate"
2025	Toby Goodshank	"Chariot Year"
2025	Preston Spurlock	"The Pain Is Universal"
