= Corook =

American singer-songwriter and TikToker

- Born: Corinne Savage; January 24, 1995 (age 31); Pittsburgh, Pennsylvania
- Origin: Nashville, Tennessee
- Genres: Alternative pop; indie pop; pop rock
- Occupations: Singer-songwriter, multi-instrumentalist
- Years active: 2021–present
- Label: Atlantic
- Partner: Olivia Barton (2018–present)
- Website: corook.com

TikTok information
- Page: Corook
- Followers: 920.6K
- Last updated: Aug 6, 2023

Corinne Savage (born January 24, 1995), known professionally as Corook, is an American singer-songwriter, producer, and multi-instrumentalist based in Nashville, Tennessee.

Active since 2021, their debut EP, achoo!, was released on April 1, 2022, via Atlantic Records. They have toured with K. Flay, JP Saxe, and Jukebox the Ghost. Corook is also active on TikTok, having gone viral with the songs "It's OK!" in 2022, and "If I Were a Fish" in 2023.

== Early life and education ==
Corook was born January 24, 1995, and grew up in Pittsburgh, Pennsylvania. Their musical interest began in middle school, when their mother overheard them singing Sara Bareilles's "Love Song" and encouraged them to audition for the school talent show.

Corook attended Berklee College of Music, where they studied songwriting and contemporary writing and production, and played in the alt-pop band, luhx. They graduated in 2017 with a dual degree. Their parents are divorced.

== Career ==
Corook's stage name came from their girlfriend, fellow musician Olivia Barton, who had jokingly nicknamed them "Corook Skoovage". Their first tour as Corook was in early 2022, supporting K.Flay, followed by touring with JP Saxe. On April 1, 2022, Corook released their debut EP, achoo! through Atlantic Records, which they produced largely by themself. In June 2022, Corook performed at Bonnaroo Music and Arts Festival, the same year they released their first single. Later in the year, they opened for X Ambassadors' "A Night Benefitting Reproductive Rights" at the Troubadour in Los Angeles, toured with Jukebox the Ghost, and performed at Mexico City's Corona Capital festival. They appeared at South by Southwest in 2022 and 2023 and were announced to play at the 2023 Nashville Pride in June.

=== "If I Were a Fish" ===
In April 2023, Corook posted a TikTok video of them and Barton performing a song titled "If I Were a Fish". The video subsequently went viral on the platform, receiving reaching 1 million views in two hours and 16 million by the following month. Various users made duet videos adding harmonies, dancing, and additional instruments to the song; among these were musician Chloe Moriondo, Broadway star Kevin Chamberlin, and the Texas Girls' Choir, all of whom posted cover versions. Illustrator and Robby Novak collaborator Brad Montague created a hand-illustrated mini music video for the song, and Hank Green, Elamin Abdelmahmoud, Dodie, and Tori Kelly were among those who praised it on social media.

Corook and Barton released a full version of the song on April 21 via Atlantic. The following week, Corook held an impromptu singalong of the song at Washington Square Park; while they expected a small turnout, an estimated 300 people attended the performance. Upon release, the song became a BBC Radio 1 Top Pop Pick and was chosen as a Staff Pick by Allie Gregory of Exclaim!, who wrote "While its initial 50-second clip bordered on too-cute, the subsequently released full recording adds depth in its ensuing verses, switching up its imagery to skipping rocks that are the "perfect shape" and coupled-up socks, spreading a subtle message of queer love and acceptance." The song also marked both Corook and Barton's debut on the Billboard charts, premiering at No. 16 on Hot Alternative Songs, No. 19 on Hot Rock Songs, No. 22 on Hot Rock & Alternative Songs, No. 6 on Alternative Digital Song Sales, No.7 on Rock Digital Song Sales, and No. 36 on the all-genre Digital Song Sales, and reaching 1.9 million official US streams and 3,000 downloads in the April 21–27 tracking week according to Luminate. Additionally, Corook themself debuted at No. 46 on the Billboard Twitter Real-Time Emerging Artists chart.

A second EP, Serious Person (Part 1), which featured "If I Were a Fish", was released by Atlantic on June 2, 2023.

== Artistry ==
Corook's music has been primarily identified as alternative pop, as well as indie pop and pop rock, and has drawn comparisons to the songwriting of Phoebe Bridgers and Stephen Sondheim. Their lyrics have been described as a "mix of lighthearted and humorous while being simultaneously devastating". Their single "CGI" employed elements of funk. Corook has self-described their sound as "2000's Gwen Stefani does acid and decides to write a Broadway musical about the Beatles starring Timbaland", and has cited Drake, Stefani, Linkin Park, Robert Glasper, Tierra Whack, Anderson .Paak, Muna, Robyn, and Mac Miller as influences. They are a multi-instrumentalist who plays guitar, bass guitar, piano, drums, ukulele, banjo, mandolin, and synthesizer.

== Personal life ==
Corook and fellow musician Olivia Barton have been in a relationship since 2018; they met at Berklee College after Corook heard Barton performing with the school's a cappella group. They adopted a dog, Cubby, in 2021.

Corook was raised in the Catholic Church and has said of their upbringing, "There's a lot of religious trauma" and "There’s a lot of stuff that I had to deal with, especially coming out and even getting into my adulthood and looking back and in everyday life, realizing all of the beliefs that I still have as somebody that grew up Catholic. And then I will judge myself, or other people, and be like, 'I don’t actually even believe this. Why is this still with me?'".

Corook is queer and non-binary. In a February 2023 video posted to Instagram, they publicly discussed using they/them pronouns, having begun doing so on a recent tour, and described themself as "in the middle" of exploring their gender identity. They told ABC News in May 2023, "I just write about my experience as a queer, non-binary, twenty-something year old trying to stay positive in this really really scary, difficult world."

They have struggled with anxiety since childhood and have often used music and humor to manage their mental health and cope with difficult family moments.

== Discography ==
=== Extended plays ===
Extended play, with selected details
Title	EP details
Achoo!	Released: April 1, 2022; Label: Atlantic
Serious Person (Part 1)	Released: June 2, 2023; Label: Atlantic
Serious Person (Part 2)	Released: September 22, 2023; Label: Atlantic

=== Singles ===
List of singles, with selected chart positions
Year	Title	Peak chart positions				Album
Year	Title	US Digital	US Hot Alt.	US Hot Rock	US Hot Rock & Alt.	Album
2021	"Sims"	—	—	—	—	Achoo!
2022	"Bad Friend"	—	—	—	—	Achoo!
2022	"Degree"	—	—	—	—	Achoo!
2022	"IDK God"	—	—	—	—	Achoo!
2022	"BDSM"	—	—	—	—	non-album singles
2022	"It's OK!"	—	—	—	—	non-album singles
2022	"Hell Yeah"	—	—	—	—	non-album singles
2022	"Your Mom"	—	—	—	—	non-album singles
2022	"Smoothie"	—	—	—	—	non-album singles
2022	"Realistic"	—	—	—	—	non-album singles
2022	"Stacy's Mom" (Fountains of Wayne cover)	—	—	—	—	non-album singles
2023	"The Dog"	—	—	—	—	non-album singles
2023	"I'm Not Doing Well"	—	—	—	—	Serious Person (Part 1)
2023	"CGI"	—	—	—	—	Serious Person (Part 1)
2023	"If I Were a Fish" (featuring Olivia Barton)	36	16	19	22	Serious Person (Part 1)
2023	"Serious Person"	—	—	—	—	Serious Person (Part 1)

=== Music videos ===
List of music videos
Year	Title	Director
2021	"Sims"	Luke Harvey
2022	"Bad Friend"	Luke Harvey
2022	"Degree"	Luke Harvey
2022	"Hell Yeah"	Corook
2022	"It's OK!"	Luke Harvey
2022	"Your Mom"	Luke Harvey
2022	"Realistic"	Jacob Cummings
2023	"The Dog"	Luke Harvey
2023	"If I Were a Fish"	Luke Harvey
