= The Moldy Peaches (album) =

Studio album by the Moldy Peaches
- Released: September 11, 2001
- Genre: Indie rock; lo-fi
- Length: 44:23
- Label: Rough Trade

The Moldy Peaches chronology
| X-Ray Vision EP (1996) | The Moldy Peaches (2001) | "County Fair" / "Rainbows" (2002) |

The Moldy Peaches is the debut album by American indie rock band the Moldy Peaches. It was primarily recorded in a basement in Port Townsend, Washington, and was released in 2001. The album has the dubious distinction of being released in the United States on September 11, 2001, the date of the attacks on the World Trade Center, while coincidentally featuring a song called "NYC's Like a Graveyard".

== Critical reception ==
Professional ratings
Review scores
| Source | Rating |
|---|---|
| AllMusic | 1.5/5 stars |
| The Guardian | 4/5 stars |
| Hot Press | 8/12 |
| Mojo | 3/5 stars |
| NME | 8/10 |
| Pitchfork | 6.5/10 |
| Rolling Stone | 3/5 stars |
| The Rolling Stone Album Guide | 4/5 stars |
| Stylus Magazine | C+ |
| The Village Voice | A− |

In a positive review for NME magazine, music critic Kitty Empire called The Moldy Peaches "extremely amusing and often brilliant" because of its endearing songs and absurdist lyrics, which she felt distinguishes the band from other indie acts. Robert Christgau of The Village Voice found Dawson's songwriting more endearing and vulnerable than the "ambitious" Green, but said that they are both "cute folkies who break without warning into punk noise and sing a deeply catchy song called 'Who's Got the Crack,' cute floozies who'll fuck anybody with anything when that's their mood or stage of life".

In a less enthusiastic review for Rolling Stone, Jenny Eliscu wrote that the "joyously messy" album is made up mostly of "low-fi, potty-mouthed indie rock" and raunchy humor, which listeners will either find "hilarious or stupid". AllMusic's Daniel Greenwald was more critical and said the Moldy Peaches tried to be funny with their use of provocative language, but sounded like a witless, untalented version of the indie band Beat Happening.

The Moldy Peaches finished 31st in the voting for the Pazz & Jop, an annual critics poll run by The Village Voice. Christgau, the poll's creator, placed it second on his own year-end list. Mojo magazine ranked it 29th on its list of 2001's best records. In a retrospective review for The Rolling Stone Album Guide (2004), editor Christian Hoard wrote that the album showcased a songwriting duo who could successfully combine "oddball juvenalia and superb melodies". In his ballot for Rolling Stone's decade-end poll, Christgau later named The Moldy Peaches the 11th best album of the 2000s.

== Track listing ==
All tracks are written by Kimya Dawson & Adam Green except where noted.

| No. | Title | Writer(s) | Length |
|---|---|---|---|
| 1. | "Lucky Number Nine" | | 2:08 |
| 2. | "Jorge Regula" | | 3:06 |
| 3. | "What Went Wrong" | | 1:35 |
| 4. | "Nothing Came Out" | | 5:04 |
| 5. | "Downloading Porn with Davo" | | 2:24 |
| 6. | "These Burgers" | | 2:01 |
| 7. | "Steak for Chicken" | | 2:43 |
| 8. | "On Top" | | 2:03 |
| 9. | "Greyhound Bus" | | 1:15 |
| 10. | "Anyone Else but You" | | 2:59 |
| 11. | "Little Bunny Foo Foo" | | 1:19 |
| 12. | "The Ballad of Helen Keller & Rip Van Winkle" | | 2:08 |
| 13. | "Who’s Got the Crack" | Dawson, Green, Grrr Anpar | 3:25 |
| 14. | "Lucky Charms" | | 3:08 |
| 15. | "D. 2. Boyfriend" | | 1:39 |
| 16. | "I Forgot" | | 2:09 |
| 17. | "Lazy Confessions" | | 1:48 |
| 18. | "NYC’s Like a Graveyard" | | 3:15 |
| 19. | "Goodbye Song" | | 2:13 |
| Total length: | | | 48:32 |

== Personnel ==
Credits are adapted from original CD track credits

The Moldy Peaches

- Adam Green
- Kimya Dawson

Guest Musicians

- Brian Piltin – bass on "Nothing Came Out", "Steak For Chicken" and "Who's Got The Crack?"; vocals on "Who's Got The Crack?"
- Jack Dishel – drums on "Nothing Came Out", "Steak For Chicken" and "Who's Got The Crack?"; vocals on "Nothing Came Out" and "Who's Got The Crack?"
- Chris Barron – guitar on "Anyone Else But You"; vocals on "Lucky Charms"
- Steve Espinola – piano on "Jorge Regula"
- Drew Blood – vocals and piano on "Downloading Porn With Davo"
- Denise Koleda – bass on "Little Bunny Foo Foo"
- Kurt Feldman – drums on "Little Bunny Foo Foo"
- Adam Goldstein – vocals on "Who's Got The Crack?"
- Hollis Smith – vocals on "Lucky Charms"
