= Ashley Whillans =

Canadian and American author

Ashley Whillans (b. May 25, 1988 in Vancouver) is a Canadian and American author, former actor and assistant professor at Harvard Business School. She researches the ways that people's decisions about time and money impact their well-being, and has given a TED Talk about work-life balance.

== Early life and education ==
Whillans grew up in Coquitlam, British Columbia. She began acting as a child, signing with an agent and performing in theatre and film, including an appearance in the film Juno where she was known for giving Elliot Page's character the "stink eye". She studied at the Royal Academy of Dramatic Art, graduating in 2008.

Whillans went on to obtain her BA, MA, and PhD in Social Psychology from the University of British Columbia.

== Career ==
Whillans began her academic career as a visiting scholar and guest lecturer at the University of Chicago Booth School of Business.

She co-founded the British Columbia Public Service Agency's Department of Behavioral Science in the Policy, Innovation, and Engagement Division in 2016.

Currently, she teaches at Harvard Business School in the Negotiation, Organizations & Markets Unit.

Her book 2020 Time Smart focuses on the concepts of time poverty and time affluence.

== Awards and recognition ==
- 2015 – Named a “Rising Star of Behavioral Science” by the International Policy Exchange and the Behavioral Science & Policy Association
- 2018 – Named a “Rising Star of Behavioral Science” by the International Policy Exchange and the Behavioral Science & Policy Association
- 2018 – Canadian Association for Graduate Studies (CAGS)/ProQuest Distinguished Dissertation Award
- 2022 – SAGE Emerging Career Trajectory Award from the Society for Personality and Social Psychology (SPSP)

== Books ==
- Time Smart: Tools for Reclaiming Your Time and Living a Happier Life (Harvard Business Review Press, 2020)
