= The Moldy Peaches =

American indie band

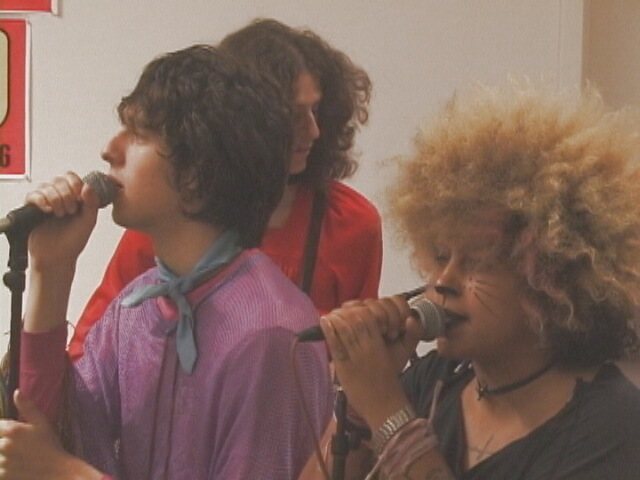
- Adam Green and Kimya Dawson in 2001

Background information
- Origin: New York City, New York, U.S.
- Genres: Anti-folk, lo-fi, garage rock, indie folk, twee pop, comedy
- Years active: 1994–2004, 2007–2008, 2022–present
- Labels: Sanctuary, Rough Trade, Org Music
- Members: Kimya Dawson; Adam Green; Brent Cole; Jack Dishel; Steven Mertens; Toby Goodshank
- Past members: Justice Campbell; Jest Commons; Chris Barron; Brian Piltin; Aaron Wilkinson
- Website: Official website

The Moldy Peaches are an American indie group founded by Adam Green and Kimya Dawson. Leading proponents of the anti-folk scene, the band had been on hiatus since 2004, but in 2023 announced on Twitter that they would be reuniting. The appearance of their song "Anyone Else but You" in the film Juno significantly raised their profile; Dawson and Green made a handful of reunion appearances together in December 2007.

== History ==
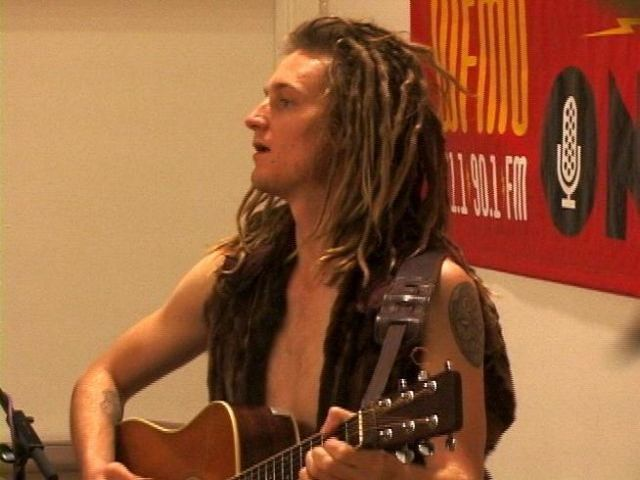
Aaron Wilkinson

Green and Dawson met at Exile on Main Street Records in Mount Kisco, New York, and began working together. Green put out a 7-inch EP called X-Ray Vision under the name the Moldy Peaches, featuring recordings he made from 1994 to 1996 with Dawson and various other friends, notably Jules Sheridan, a songwriter based in Scotland. Green and Dawson recorded a CDR album in 1998 under the name Moldy Peaches 2000 called FER THE KIDS before Dawson moved to Port Townsend, Washington.

In early 1999, Green joined her there, and more home and live recordings transpired. The band returned to New York City as a four piece later in the year, including Jest Commons, guitar, and Justin Campbell, drums. They became active on the New York City anti-folk scene, playing at the SideWalk Cafe before the band broke up. Dawson and Green both recorded solo albums. The band reformed in August 2000 with Chris Barron of the Spin Doctors on lead guitar, Brian Piltin on bass guitar, and Strictly Beats (Brent Cole) on drums. (The "2000" was dropped from their name around this time). A new 11 song album was recorded, which led to a deal with Rough Trade in the UK. They gained recognition after their initial 7" 'Who's Got the Crack" was named 'Single of the Week' in NME. Rough Trade released the album The Moldy Peaches in 2001. Released in the U.S. on September 11, 2001, the same day as the September 11 attacks, it contained the song "NYC Is Like a Graveyard." The band expanded to a six-piece, with guitarists Jack Dishel and Aaron Wilkinson, bass player Steven Mertens, and drummer Strictly Beats, augmenting the original duo of Dawson and Green. They toured internationally with The Strokes with whom they shared record label and management.

Aaron Wilkinson left the band and was replaced by Toby Goodshank. Wilkinson died from an overdose in July 2003. The Strokes dedicated their album Room on Fire to his memory.

In 2003, a second album Moldy Peaches 2000 was released, a double-CD compilation of various scraps and live recordings.

After an extensive U.S. headlining tour in the winter of 2003, the band went into hiatus in early 2004. However, the band reunited in late 2004 for a one-off show to benefit Accidental CDs, Records and Tapes, a hole-in-the-wall record store on Ave A in NYC. That store was an early supporter of the band and helped hook them up with the gig that ultimately got them their record deal. Both central members embarked on solo careers.

On December 2, 2007, Dawson and Green played an impromptu set together at The Smell in Los Angeles to end a show where Dawson was headlining. They changed the lyrics of the song "Who's Got The Crack" to "Who's Got The Blues". On December 3, 2007, the Moldy Peaches played at the Juno film premiere.

The band was booked to appear on Late Night with Conan O'Brien on January 14, 2008, but they canceled because of the writer's strike. Dawson has said that she is not keen to reform the band at present. However, Dawson and Green did appear together on the NPR radio show Bryant Park Project on January 16, 2008. and appeared on television show The View on January 21, 2008.

Subsequent to the success of the Juno soundtrack, which hit No. 1 on the Billboard 200 on its third week of physical release, the song "Anyone Else but You" was released as a UK single on February 25, 2008.

On November 13, 2011, the Moldy Peaches played a short set at the Knitting Factory in New York.

The Moldy Peaches played three European sets in 2023, in London, Barcelona and Madrid.

On August 10 and 11, 2023, The Moldy Peaches played two sets at Brooklyn Steel in Brooklyn, NY.

On October 13, 2024, the Moldy Peaches released an alternate version of 'Anyone Else but You'.

In 2026, Adventure Time: Side Quests used covers of the Adventure Time theme song and "Island Song (Come Along With Me)" by The Moldy Peaches for the opening and closing theme songs.

== Solo projects ==
Green released his seventh solo album and accompanying film, Aladdin, in 2016 via Fat Possum. His initial band included a 3-piece string section.

Dawson has continued to tour playing small clubs and house parties. Her album Remember That I Love You on K Records has been well received. Dawson collaborated with Aesop Rock on the album Hokey Fright under the name The Uncluded.

Dishel's former outfit Stipplicon having broken up, he formed a new band, Only Son, who have toured with Regina Spektor. Dishel also plays in Spektor's band.

Mertens has his own group SpaceCamp and plays in Green's backing band.

Cole is in the boyband Candy Boys and has performed with numerous acts including Dufus, Jeffrey Lewis, Only Son, Sandra Bernhard, and Toby Goodshank.

Goodshank plays solo shows and is also in a duo, Double Deuce, with his sister Angela.

== Notable appearances ==
- The song "Anyone Else but You" was used in the Academy Award-nominated documentary film Murderball.
- The song "Anyone Else but You" was used in a mobile phone TV-ad in France during World Cup 2006, featuring French star Zinedine Zidane.
- The song "Anyone Else but You" is central to the 2007 Academy Award-winning film Juno and a version is also performed by the two main characters (Elliot Page (Note: Credited as Ellen Page) and Michael Cera).
- A re-written version of "Anyone Else but You" was featured in a commercial for Atlantis Resorts in the Bahamas.
- The song "Jorge Regula" was used in a Pepsodent commercial in Hispanic America, without the group's permission.
- A version of the song "Jorge Regula" also appears in the 2006 indie film The Guatemalan Handshake.

== Personnel ==
=== Current members ===
- Kimya Dawson – vocals, guitars (1994–2004, 2007–2008, 2022-present)
- Adam Green – vocals, guitars (1994–2004, 2007–2008, 2022-present)
- Jack Dishel – guitars (2001–2004, 2007–2008, 2022-present)
- Steven Mertens – bass (2001–2004, 2007–2008, 2022-present)
- Toby Goodshank – guitars (2002–2004, 2007–2008, 2022-present)
- Brent ‘Strictly Beats’ Cole – drums (2000–2004, 2007–2008, 2022-present)

=== Past members ===
- Justice Campbell – drums (1999)
- Jest Commons – guitars (1999)
- Chris Barron – guitars (2000–2001)
- Brian Piltin – bass (2000–2001)
- Aaron Wilkinson – guitars (2001–2002; died 2003)

== Discography ==
- The Moldy Peaches (Rough Trade Records, 2001)

=== Additional releases ===
- X-Ray Vision (1996) (Self released 7-inch EP)
- "The Love Boat" - Live!!! (1999) _{(self released demo)}
- Moldy Peaches 2000 Ferever (2000) _{(self released demo)}
- "County Fair/Rainbows" (Rough Trade Records, 2002) (CD single)
- Moldy Peaches 2000: Unreleased Cutz and Live Jamz 1994-2002 (Rough Trade Records, 2003) (Rarities compilation)
- Origin Story: 1994–1999 (Org Music, 2022) (Rarities compilation)

=== Compilation appearances ===
- Music from the Film Garage Days ("Lucky Number Nine") – Festival Mushroom Records 2002
- Music from the Film Murderball ("Anyone Else but You") – Commotion 2005
- Music from the Motion Picture Juno ("Anyone Else but You") – Rhino Records 2007
