= Juno (film) =

2007 American film by Jason Reitman

- Theatrical release poster
- Directed by: Jason Reitman
- Written by: Diablo Cody
- Produced by: Lianne Halfon; John Malkovich; Mason Novick; Russell Smith
- Starring: Elliot Page (Note: Credited as Ellen Page); Michael Cera; Jennifer Garner; Jason Bateman; Allison Janney; J. K. Simmons
- Cinematography: Eric Steelberg
- Edited by: Dana E. Glauberman
- Music by: Mateo Messina
- Production companies: Mandate Pictures; Mr. Mudd
- Distributed by: Fox Searchlight Pictures
- Release dates: September 1, 2007 (Telluride); December 5, 2007 (United States)
- Running time: 96 minutes
- Country: United States
- Language: English
- Budget: $6.5–$7.5 million
- Box office: $232.3 million

Juno is a 2007 American comedy-drama film directed by Jason Reitman and written by Diablo Cody. Elliot Page stars as the title character, an independent-minded teenager confronting her unplanned pregnancy and the subsequent events that put pressures of adult life onto her. Michael Cera, Jennifer Garner, Jason Bateman, Allison Janney and J. K. Simmons also star. Filming took place in February and March of 2007 in Vancouver, British Columbia. It premiered on September 8 at the 2007 Toronto International Film Festival.

Juno won the Academy Award for Best Original Screenplay and earned three other nominations for Best Picture, Best Director for Reitman, and Best Actress for 20-year old Page (who was presenting as female at the time, and is the sixth-youngest nominee in the category). The film's soundtrack, featuring several songs performed by Kimya Dawson in various guises, was the first chart-topping soundtrack since 2006's Dreamgirls and Fox Searchlight's first number-one soundtrack. Juno earned back its initial budget of $6.5 million in twenty days, the first nineteen of which were when the film was in limited release. It went on to earn $232.3 million worldwide. Juno received acclaim from critics, many of whom placed the film on their top-ten lists for the year. It has received criticism and praise from members of both the anti-abortion and abortion rights communities regarding its treatment of abortion.

== Plot ==
In Elk River, Minnesota, 16-year-old high-schooler Juno MacGuff discovers she is pregnant after sleeping with her friend and longtime admirer Paulie Bleeker. Originally intending to get an abortion, Juno visits a local women's clinic and encounters a schoolmate outside, who is holding a one-person anti-abortion vigil. Once inside, Juno finds herself unable to go through with the procedure and decides to give the baby up for adoption. With the help of her friend Leah, Juno searches the ads in the Pennysaver and finds a childless married couple she feels will provide a suitable home. She informs her father Mac and stepmother Bren of the pregnancy and her plan and they offer Juno their support. With Mac, Juno meets the couple, Mark and Vanessa Loring, in their expensive Saint Cloud home, and agrees to a closed adoption.

Mark works at home composing commercial jingles, having abandoned his rock band youth, which is now confined to memorabilia displayed in a single room of the house that Vanessa has designated for his personal belongings. Juno learns that she and Mark share tastes in punk rock and horror films, and starts visiting him frequently to hang out. One day, Juno and Leah run into Vanessa at the mall, where they watch her interact with children, looking completely content and in her element. Juno encourages Vanessa to talk to the baby in Juno's womb, which kicks for Vanessa.

As the pregnancy progresses, Juno struggles with her feelings for Paulie, whom she has maintained an outwardly indifferent attitude towards, but jealously arises after learning he has asked another girl to the upcoming prom. Paulie reminds Juno that she requested they remain distant, and tells her she broke his heart.

Shortly before her due date, Juno visits Mark again. Their interaction becomes emotional, culminating in Mark confiding that he plans on leaving Vanessa to figure his life out. Distraught by this, Juno implores him to change his mind. Mark questions her feelings for him and the intent behind her regular visits, revealing he is starting to develop an attraction to her. When Vanessa arrives home, Mark admits that he does not feel ready to be a father. Juno drives away and breaks down in tears by the side of the road. She then returns to the Lorings' home and leaves a note on the front porch.

After a heartfelt discussion with her father, Juno accepts that she is in love with Paulie. She confesses her feelings to him, and they share a kiss. Not long after, Juno goes into labor and is rushed to the hospital, where she gives birth to a baby boy. Despite having deliberately not told Paulie because of his track meet, he infers that she is giving birth after seeing her missing from the stands and rushes to the hospital, where he comforts her as she cries.

Vanessa comes to the hospital and joyfully claims the newborn boy as a single adoptive mother. On the wall in the baby's new nursery, Vanessa has framed Juno's note, which reads: "Vanessa: If you're still in, I'm still in. —Juno." The film ends in the summertime with Juno and Paulie, now in a happy relationship, playing guitar and singing together.

== Cast ==
- Elliot Page as Juno MacGuff, pregnant teenager and Paulie's girlfriend
- Michael Cera as Paulie Bleeker, the father of Juno's child and Juno's boyfriend
- Jennifer Garner as Vanessa Loring, Mark's wife and the prospective adoptive mother of Juno's child
- Jason Bateman as Mark Loring, Vanessa's husband and the prospective adoptive father of Juno's child
- Allison Janney as Bren MacGuff, Juno's stepmother
- J. K. Simmons as Mac MacGuff, Juno's father
- Olivia Thirlby as Leah, Juno's friend
- Eileen Pedde as Gerta Rauss, the Lorings' lawyer
- Rainn Wilson as Rollo, convenience store clerk
- Valerie Tian as Su-Chin, anti-abortion protester
- Emily Perkins as punk abortion clinic receptionist
- Ashley Whillans as Katrina De Voort

== Production ==
=== Development ===
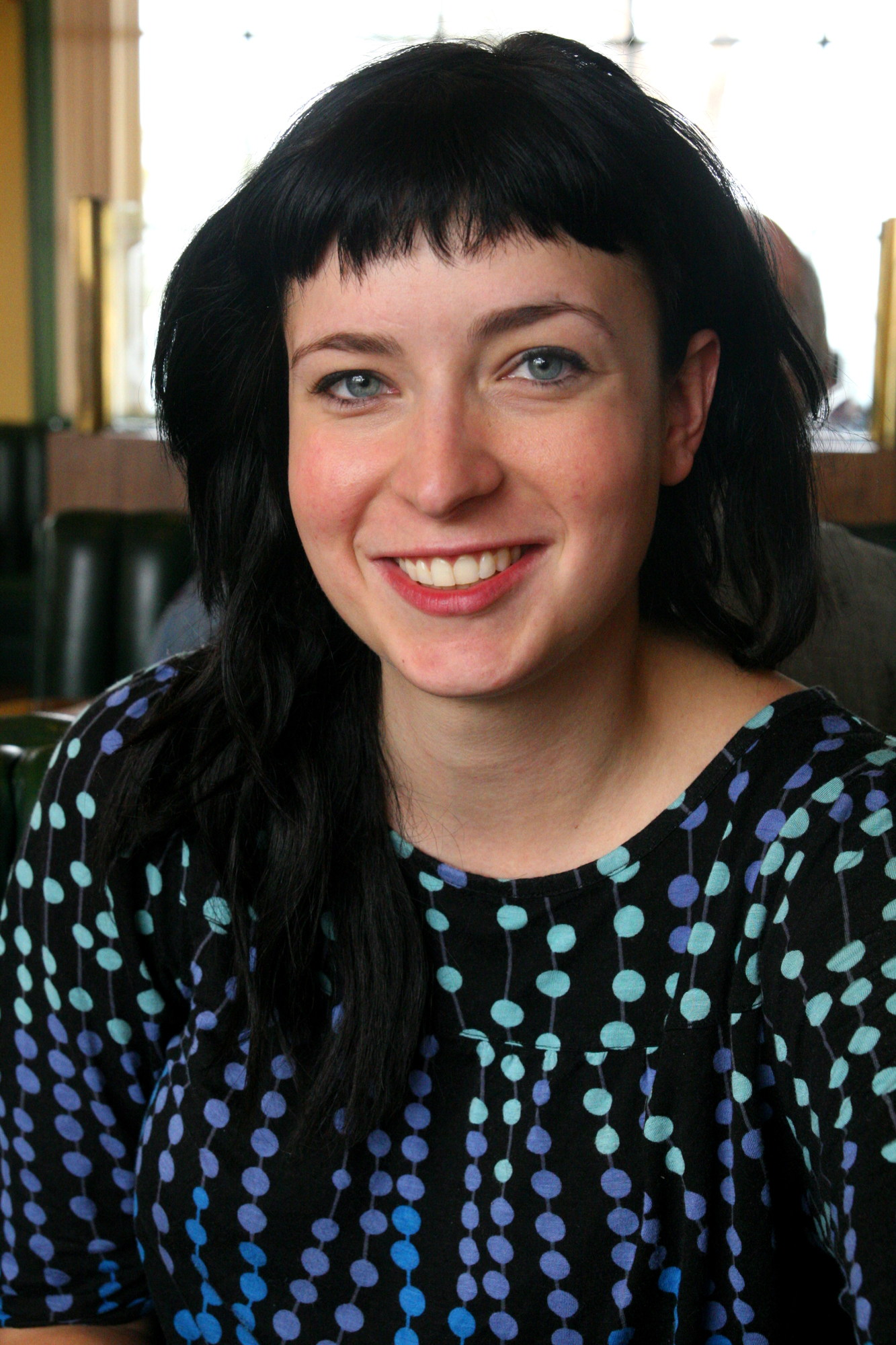
Diablo Cody wrote the film based on many of her own high school experiences.

American writer Diablo Cody was first approached to write a screenplay by film producer Mason Novick, who had previously landed her a book deal for her memoir, Candy Girl: A Year in the Life of an Unlikely Stripper, after discovering her blog about stripping. He persuaded her to adapt the book for the screen, but suggested that she first write a screenwriting sample to show studios; that sample became Juno. After deciding on an adoption storyline, Cody collected the stories of adoptees, birth parents and adoptive parents, including that of her then-husband, an adoptee who reunited with his birth parents after she wrote the film. She also found inspiration in the story of a close friend who had become pregnant in high school and used some details from her friend's experience in the film, such as mistreatment from an ultrasound technician. Much of Juno, however, was based on Cody's own high school experiences: She dated a tic-tac-loving boy similar to Paulie, she was best friends with a cheerleader like Leah, and she used a hamburger phone identical to the one that appears in the film. After writing the screenplay over seven weeks in the Starbucks section of a Target store in Crystal, Minnesota, Cody compared writing to breathing, seeing Juno as an extension of herself.

Novick sent Cody's screenplay to his friend Jason Reitman; by the time Reitman had read halfway through the script, he felt that if he did not direct the film, he would regret it for the rest of his life. Initially, Reitman found it difficult to acquire the script, because his first film, Thank You for Smoking (2005), had not been released yet, so he did not have any feature film credits. Other directors, including Jon Poll, were considered, but Reitman was chosen and he interrupted work on his own spec script in order to direct Juno. Cody says she had a cynical attitude when writing Juno ("I didn't ever think this film would be produced") and, indeed, the film was delayed by financial problems. After its controversial nature scared off a number of major studios, John Malkovich's production company, Mr. Mudd, took on the project. It was later brought to production company Mandate Pictures by co-producer Jim Miller. The funding originated from the United States.

=== Casting ===
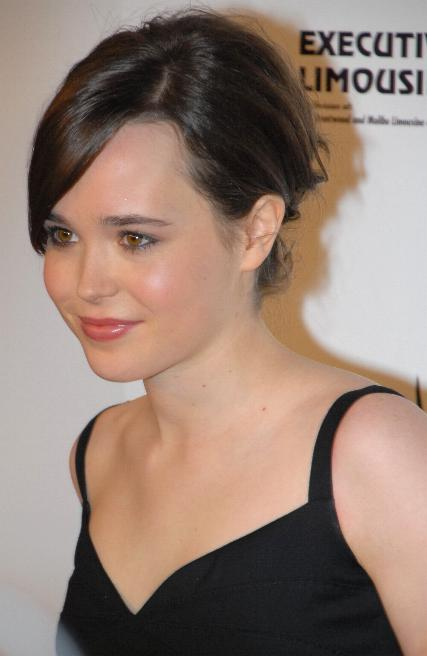
Jason Reitman pictured Elliot Page as Juno when he first read the script.

Having admired his performance in Hard Candy, Reitman cast Page in the lead role, saying that when he read the screenplay for the first time he pictured Page as Juno. Reitman visited Page on the set of a film on which he was working to offer him the role. He also handed the script to J.K. Simmons, who had featured in his previous film, Thank You for Smoking, not telling him that he intended Simmons to play Mac. Simmons says that, after reading the script, he would have been happy to play even the high school teacher who has no speaking lines. Other cast members Reitman had "in mind right from the start" were Olivia Thirlby—who had originally unsuccessfully auditioned for the role of Juno—and Michael Cera. He took them with Page and Simmons to a Panavision stage in California and shot 45 pages of the script on 35mm film against a black backdrop. He presented this footage to Fox Searchlight as the initial cast. Reitman highlighted the importance of doing a screen test instead of individual auditions, saying: "This is a movie that's all about relationships and the idea of auditioning people outside of each other, one-on-one with the casting director, didn't make sense."

Jennifer Garner, who accepted a lower salary than usual to prevent the film from exceeding its budget, was confirmed by Reitman to have signed onto the project in January 2007. After working with Jason Bateman on The Kingdom, Garner recommended him to Reitman when they first met; Bateman was cast as Mark, the last cast member to be signed. Lucas McFadden, better known as Cut Chemist, a DJ and record producer, makes a cameo appearance as Juno and Paulie's chemistry teacher. McFadden was doing scoring work for Reitman when he received the Juno screenplay and asked McFadden to appear in the film; Reitman thought that it was "perfect irony" for the chemistry teacher to be played by Cut Chemist.

Michael Cera stated that the film had "a lot of Canadian influence" due to the fact that he and Page were Canadian and that a lot of the other actors originated from Vancouver. Cera's comment was a response to a statement from Peter Howell of the Toronto Star: "I thought Juno was a very Canadian movie, even though it was set in the U.S."

=== Filming ===
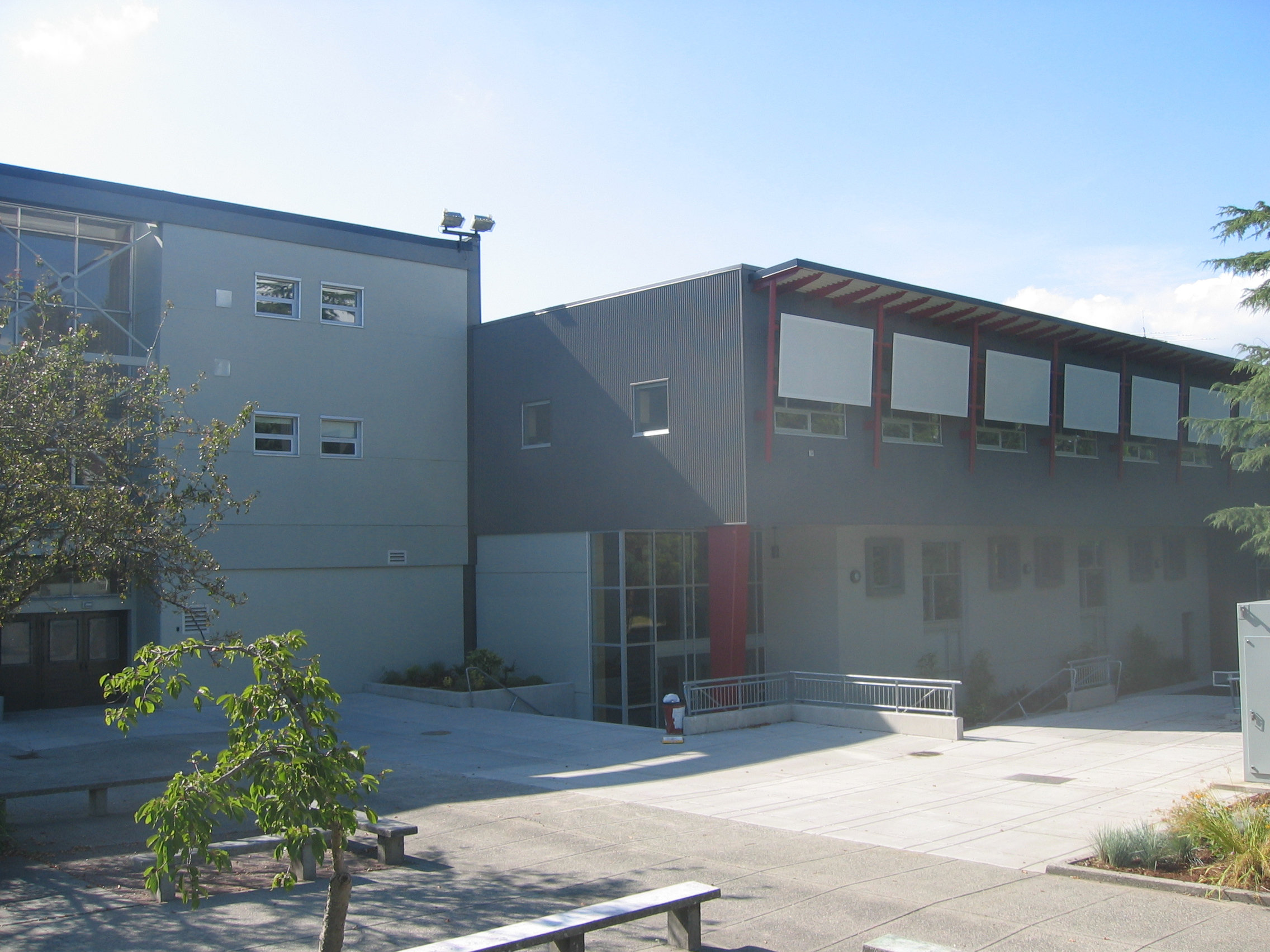
Eric Hamber Secondary School stood in for the fictional Dancing Elk High School.

Shooting on a budget of US$6.5 million, Juno was filmed in and around Vancouver, British Columbia, standing in for Minnesota, where production was originally intended to take place. Although films commonly use a Canada-as-America location shift for budgetary reasons, Reitman insists the choice of filming location was instead at his request. Filming locations included a house in nearby White Rock as Mark and Vanessa's home, Eric Hamber Secondary School as Dancing Elk High School, and South Surrey's Athletic Park track as Dancing Elk High School's athletics track.

After minimal rehearsal, filming took place in February and March 2007 on a six-week schedule, of which 30 days were designated to filming. The crew was planning to import snow for the film's winter events, but it snowed on location, and they were able to reschedule filming to shoot the winter scenes during snowfall, which second assistant director Josy Capkun says resulted in much wider snow shots than originally planned. Although the film was shot out of sequence, the final scene was scheduled for the final day and, after a long period of rain, the crew was intending to shut down production and resume months later to shoot the scene, set in summer, but the rain stopped and they were able to shoot the scene in the sun. That final scene depicted Juno and Paulie singing the Moldy Peaches' "Anyone Else but You", and band member Kimya Dawson visited the set to speak to Page and Cera while they were practicing the song.

=== Music ===
The movie features several songs performed by Kimya Dawson as well as her bands Antsy Pants and the Moldy Peaches. According to director Jason Reitman, Page suggested the Moldy Peaches' work as fitting for Juno's character. Reitman recounts that Page:

went on my computer, played the songs, and I fell in love with it. Diablo and I discussed putting a Moldy Peaches song in it where the characters would sing to each other. I got in touch with Kimya Dawson of the Moldy Peaches and she started sending me her work, which was beautiful, and that became a lot of the soundtrack.

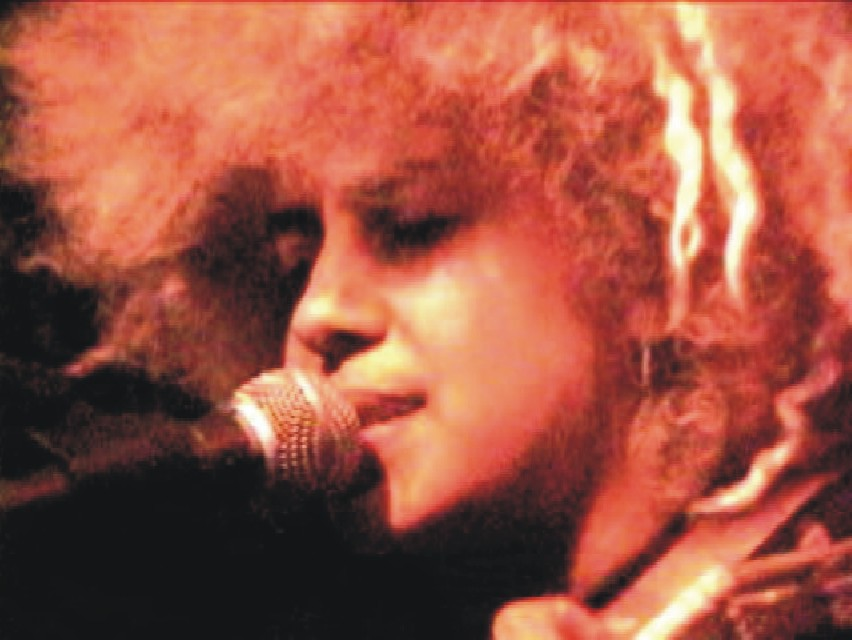
Kimya Dawson provided both solo songs and songs from two of her former bands.

Reitman contacted Dawson, and, after reading the film's screenplay, she agreed for her songs to be used in the film, sending him a packet of CDs containing about 120 songs. The songs were almost entirely self-published by Dawson, who says she wrote nothing specifically for Juno and that all the songs had been performed and recorded before she was contacted to work on the film. Reitman asked her to additionally re-record instrumentals, which included humming over the lyrics of some of her songs. He also contacted composer Mateo Messina, with whom he had previously worked on Thank You for Smoking, to compose the film's incidental score. He gave Messina a collection of Dawson's songs and asked him to create "the sound of the film" through an instrumental score that replicated the recording quality, tone, feel and innocence of her music. Messina decided to implement an "acoustic guitar feel that was jangled and was really loose, like Juno." Experimenting with different guitars, he ended up using "Stella," a second-hand guitar belonging to guitarist Billy Katz that he described as "kind of tinny, not perfectly in tune, but [it] has all kinds of character." Katz was hired to perform acoustic and classical guitar for the movie's score, using "Stella" extensively throughout.

Page also suggested Cat Power's cover of the song "Sea of Love", which Reitman was hesitant to include as it had already been featured in the 1989 film Sea of Love; however, he decided that its inclusion would mark a "new take" on the film's cinematic references. Initially, Reitman had conceived of Juno being a fan of glam rock, but rejected it as too inauthentic, and he said he wanted to construct Juno to be "into music very real and authentic", making her a fan of punk rock, including The Runaways, Patti Smith and Iggy Pop and the Stooges. He felt that the Sonic Youth cover of "Superstar" defined Juno and Mark's relationship—Juno preferring the classic 1971 version by The Carpenters while Mark preferred Sonic Youth's 1994 cover. "A Well Respected Man" by The Kinks was a song Reitman had associated with a character from another of his screenplays and says it was "heart-breaking" when he decided to include the song as an introduction for Paulie instead, despite feeling it suited the scene perfectly. He found children's songwriter Barry Louis Polisar's "All I Want Is You" after "surfing iTunes for hours on end" using different words and names as search terms and thought that the handmade quality was perfect for the opening titles, which were afterwards made to correspond to the song. The "Brunch Bowlz" jingle, Mark writes in the film, was composed by advertisement writer Chris Corley, with whom Reitman had previously worked on a set of commercials for Wal-Mart.

=== Design ===
The film was set out in a sequence of the year's seasons, which, Reitman said, "really resonated with me when I read it, because they mirror the three trimesters of Juno's pregnancy." Because filming took place over only 30 days, fake flora was used to give the impression of different seasons while other flora was edited in post-production. Brown leaves were composited onto a fake tree outside Juno's house and cherry blossom trees outside Leah's house were touched up in a lighter shade of pink to depict autumn; a fan was used to blow leaves around in some scenes as if the leaves were falling from trees. Fake flowers were used in front of Paulie's house at the end of the film to give the impression of summer.

Cody was impressed with the production design team's creation of the set from only a few sentences in her script, calling Juno's bedroom "a very emotional set for [me] because it reminded me so much of my own little habitat when I was a teenager." The walls of Juno's room are covered with posters of bands, while Leah's room includes a mural of older men she finds attractive and Paulie's room is overly childlike to indicate his innocence. Production designer Steve Saklad designed Mark and Vanessa's house with the assumption that "Vanessa has probably read every home magazine and tried to copy what's in them as best she could." Costume designer Monique Prudhomme was nominated for a Costume Designers Guild Award in the "Excellence in Contemporary Costume Design for Film" category. She dressed Vanessa in clothes that were "simple and very tasteful" but with an "anal-retentive quality" and Mark in conservative clothing to complement Vanessa's taste. It was Page's suggestion that Juno wear flannel shirts and sweater-vests. Page also had to wear two sizes of prosthetic belly fitted like a corset in the back, a third "real" belly that is seen when Juno has an ultrasound, and a variety of sizes of fake breasts. The footage displayed on Juno's ultrasound monitor is of supervising sound designer Scott Sanders's son Matthew and was embedded into the scene in post-production.

=== Opening title sequence ===
900 hand-cut images were composited onto a background to create the opening title sequence.

Juno's opening title sequence, depicting a rotoscoped Juno walking through her town while drinking a bottle of SunnyD orange drink, was put together over 7–8 months by a small design studio, Shadowplay Studio, based in Los Angeles. Reitman had met the studio's co-founder Gareth Smith in Japan on the short film festival circuit where they each had shorts screening. Shadowplay created the opening title sequence for Reitman's previous film, Thank You for Smoking, and he contacted them again when he found out he was going to direct Juno. With vintage 1970s punk-rock posters as inspiration, Smith and artist Jenny Lee decided to create a sequence that "had texture and a little bit of edge, but also imparted the warmth and heart of the screenplay". In the last days of filming in Vancouver, Page was photographed with a high speed camera from a number of angles walking on a treadmill and drinking SunnyD. 900 still images of a walking and drinking Page were printed out and repeatedly run through a Xerox machine to degrade their quality until the pictures appeared hand-drawn. The pictures were cut out and scanned back onto the computer, then layered onto the background drawn by Lee with compositing software to create a stop motion animation sequence that corresponded to "All I Want Is You" by Barry Louis Polisar, the song Reitman had chosen. Shadowplay also designed the titlecards for each of the seasons for the film, hand-made a custom typeface for the opening title sequence and the closing credits, and collaborated on the design of the soundtrack and the DVD.

== Themes and analysis ==
Along with Knocked Up and Waitress, two other 2007 films about women facing unplanned pregnancies, Juno was interpreted by some critics as having an anti-abortion theme. Ann Hulbert of Slate magazine believed that Juno "[undercut] both pro-life and pro-choice purism." Jeff Dawson of The Sunday Times believed that the film was inevitably placed in the "unwanted pregnancy subgenre" with Knocked Up and Waitress due to its subject matter but thought that its interpretation as an anti-abortion film only "muddied the waters". Hadley Freeman of The Guardian criticized Juno for "complet[ing] a hat-trick of American comedies in the past 12 months that present abortion as unreasonable, or even unthinkable—a telling social sign", though she noted, "I don't believe any of these films is consciously designed to be anti-abortion propaganda." A. O. Scott, writing for The New York Times, agreed that Juno has "an underlying theme, a message that is not anti-abortion but rather pro-adulthood". Page commented, "What I get most frustrated at is when people call it a pro-life movie, which is just absurd ... The most important thing is the choice is there, and the film completely demonstrates that." Cody and Page have openly stated that they are in favor of abortion rights; Reitman thought that it was "fantastic" that anti-abortion and abortion rights groups were embracing the film. He said that "Juno seems to be a mirror, and people [on both sides] see themselves in it."

Many critics labelled Juno as a feminist film, purely because of Juno's portrayal as a confident and intelligent teenage girl.

Other critics labeled Juno as feminist because of its portrayal of Juno as a confident and intelligent teenage girl. Wesley Morris of The Boston Globe concluded "Juno serves cool, intelligent girls something they rarely see in a movie: themselves." Cody said about writing the film, "Women are clever, women are funny, women are sharp, and I wanted to show that these girls were human and not the stereotypical teenage girls that we often see in the media" and "There was a lack of authentic teen girl characters ... I saw writing this screenplay as an opportunity to create an iconic female." Page praised the film for its positive depiction of teenage girls, describing Juno's character as "really refreshing and allow[ing] for new possibilities in what young women can be" and "honest but original, completely devoid of stereotype", while also highlighting that "Girls haven't had that sort of character before. [They] don't have [their] Catcher in the Rye." Page criticized the media perception of the Juno character as a "strong woman", arguing that if Juno were a male character, the "strength" of the character would not be considered remarkable. Reitman was interested in the personal/political conflict for Vanessa's character: "Feminism has paved the way for Vanessa's career, but ultimately Vanessa wants to be a full time mother."

== Distribution ==
=== Theatrical release ===
With a well-received preview first screened on September 1, 2007, at the Telluride Film Festival, Juno premiered on September 8 at the 2007 Toronto International Film Festival and received a standing ovation, which prompted film critic Roger Ebert to say "I don't know when I've heard a standing ovation so long, loud and warm." It went on to feature at the Austin Film Festival, Rome Film Festival, London Film Festival, Bahamas International Film Festival, St. Louis International Film Festival, Stockholm International Film Festival, International Thessaloniki Film Festival, Gijón International Film Festival, Palm Springs International Film Festival and the International Film Festival Rotterdam, earning awards and nominations at several.

Although Juno was originally intended to open in theaters on December 15, 2007, the opening date was moved forward to take advantage of the positive reviews preceding its release, and opened in limited release on December 5, playing in only seven theaters in Los Angeles and New York City. The film opened in an additional thirteen cities and around 25 theaters on December 14, expanding further on December 21 before entering wide release on December 25.

=== Promotion ===
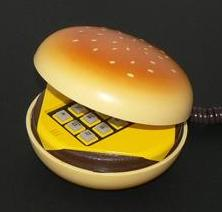
Hamburger phones were sent to critics to entice them to review the film.

Anthony Breznican of USA Today said in a 2008 article that Juno is one of three films that were "orchestrated to start off as word-of-mouth favorites among devoted moviegoers." Following Juno's release, Fox Searchlight sent hamburger phones styled similarly to that used by Juno in the film to journalists and critics to entice them to review the film. Though the phones were originally distributed in small numbers to viewers at promotional events, companies not affiliated with Fox Searchlight began to produce and sell the phones on eBay and other online stores. In the month after the film's release, sales of the phone on eBay increased by 759 percent, and was named one of the "10 Cool Gifts for Film Buffs" by Entertainment Weekly.

=== Home media ===
The film was released on DVD and Blu-ray disc on April 15, 2008, by 20th Century Fox Home Entertainment. It is available in a single disc DVD edition, which includes the movie along with an audio commentary by director Reitman and writer Cody, eleven deleted scenes, a gag reel, a 'gag take' (including a profanity laden blow-up by Rainn Wilson), a "Cast & Crew Jam", and screen tests. The two-disc DVD edition includes the same extra content and four additional featurettes ("Way Beyond 'Our' Maturity Level: Juno – Leah – Bleeker", "Diablo Cody Is Totally Boss", "Jason Reitman For Shizz", and "Honest To Blog! Creating Juno"), while the second disc is a DRM-encrypted version of the film for portable players. The Blu-ray version includes all the two-disc DVD edition extras and two additional featurettes: "Fox Movie Channel Presents: Juno World Premiere" and "Fox Movie Channel Presents: Casting Session". In its first week of release, DVD sales totaled $29,405,136, and was the most sold DVD of the week. During the week of April 27, it dropped to number two grossing $8,224,812, being surpassed by Cloverfield (2008). By July 27, the film had earned a total of $55,741,428 from DVD sales. In 2010, Juno was re-released in a double movie pack with Little Miss Sunshine (2006).

== Reception ==
=== Box office performance ===
In limited release and playing in only seven theaters in Los Angeles and New York City, Juno grossed $420,113 over its debut weekend, averaging $60,016 per screen. Juno earned back its initial budget of $6.5 million in twenty days, the first nineteen of which were when the film was in limited release. When Juno became Fox Searchlight's first film to surpass $100 million at the box office, the company's president Peter Rice issued the statement: "This is an astonishing feat for us and the film has surpassed all our expectations. We knew this film had crossover potential and it has resonated with audiences all across the country." The film has grossed $143,495,265 in the United States and $88,877,416 in other territories for a total worldwide gross of $232,372,681. It was also the highest-grossing of the five Best Picture nominees for the 80th Academy Awards.

=== Critical reaction ===
Juno received highly positive reviews from critics. On the review aggregator Rotten Tomatoes, the film has a 93% approval rating from critics based on 215 reviews, with an average rating of 8.10/10. The site's consensus states, "One of the brightest, funniest comedies of the year, Juno's smart script and direction are matched by assured performances in a coming-of-age story with a 21st-century twist", making it the best reviewed comedy film on the website in 2007. On Metacritic, the film had an average score of 81 out of 100, based on 38 reviews.

Roger Ebert of the Chicago Sun-Times gave the film four stars and called it "just about the best movie of the year. ... Has there been a better performance this year than [Elliot] Page's creation of Juno? I don't think so." Ebert placed Juno at number one on his annual "best of" list. The film also ranks at number 463 in Empire magazine's 2008 list of The 500 Greatest Movies of All Time. Juno MacGuff also ranked number 56 on Empire's list of The 100 Greatest Movie Characters of All Time. Paste Magazine named it one of the 50 Best Movies of the Decade (2000–2009), ranking it at number 15. In June 2010, Entertainment Weekly named Juno one of the 100 Greatest Characters of the Last 20 Years. In 2025, it was one of the films voted for the "Readers' Choice" edition of The New York Times' list of "The 100 Best Movies of the 21st Century," finishing at number 171.

However, not all critics share the positive view towards Juno. David Edelstein of New York magazine felt that the film was desperate to be "a movie that confers hipness on teens, that makes kids want to use the same slang and snap up the soundtrack". Music reviewer Jim DeRogatis criticized the film's stylized dialogue and what he saw as a casual take on abortion and Juno's naïveté in becoming pregnant, claiming: "As an unapologetically old-school feminist, the father of a soon-to-be-teenage daughter, a reporter who regularly talks to actual teens as part of his beat and a plain old moviegoer, I hated, hated, hated this movie."

==== "The Juno Effect" ====
In 2008, after 17 students under 16 years of age at Gloucester High School in Massachusetts became pregnant, Time magazine called it the "Juno Effect". Time stated that some adults dismissed the statistic as an outlier while others accused films such as Juno and Knocked Up for glamorizing teenage pregnancy. Kristelle Miller, an Adolescent Psychology Professor at University of Minnesota-Duluth stated that "[t]he 'Juno effect' is how media glamorizes pregnancy and how [...] pregnancy is also redemptive of any past problems".

After Senator John McCain named Alaska Governor Sarah Palin as his running mate on the Republican presidential ticket, it was revealed in September 2008 that Gov. Palin's daughter, Bristol, age 17, was pregnant with the child of another teenager. News reports and editorials termed Bristol Palin's pregnancy as the latest episode in the debate over teen pregnancy of which Juno was a part, while conservative commentators made comparisons between Bristol Palin's pregnancy and the film. Noted New Republic literary editor Leon Wieseltier, "The Republicans wanted a new conversation, and they got one. Juno in Juneau!" Fox News' Roger Friedman wondered, "Juno at once violated and vindicated conservative values. The question is, will the public rally 'round Bristol Palin the way it did Juno? Or will it reject her for getting in this situation in the first place?"

Juno actor Jason Bateman defended the film. "Unfortunately," he said, "we've had these instances where guys kill people because of what they hear in rock 'n roll lyrics or some garbage like that. Look, if you're going to blame a movie or song for your actions, whether they be good or bad, I think you're looking at the wrong things to influence your life. I think people should look to other areas of their life for lessons and guidance, mainly parents, or teachers, or friends, or whomever. That should probably be where you should point your eyes and ears."

Amy Benfer of Salon.com wrote in 2010 that, according to figures released by the Centers for Disease Control and Prevention, pregnancy rates for all teenagers dropped 2 percent between 2007 and 2008, meaning that "the slight uptick in teen pregnancy rates between 2005 and 2006 were probably just an anomaly and not some heinous trend brought about by pop culture", and that if there had been such a thing as a "Juno effect", it would have caused pregnancies to go down, not up. She criticized proponents of the theory, stating that they believed that teenagers "somehow lose all ability to evaluate any nuance or context in that woman's particular situation, and instead make some sort of primitive cause-and-effect connection" and that "by talking about pregnant girls, and most of all, by daring to portray some of them as ordinary, even likable, we'd get way more babies having babies." She concluded that "depicting teen parents may not glamorize them, so much as humanize them. You know, that thing that happens when one person recognizes that someone else is a person too? So, now that we can firmly state that realistically depicting the lives of the tiny percentage of girls who do become pregnant won't necessarily contaminate the rest of them, it's time to stop worrying and ask what we can do to help."

In light of Georgia's anti-abortion law, Diablo Cody said in 2019 she would not have written Juno now that people perceive it as an "anti-choice" film. In 2022, she said, "Back in 2008, I got a letter from some administrator at my Catholic high school thanking me for writing a movie that was in line with the school's values. And I was like: 'What have I done?' My objective as an artist is to be a traitor to that culture, not to uplift it," but also, "I have no regrets about writing the movie. I do think it's important that I continue to clarify my feelings about it because the last thing I would ever want is for someone to interpret the movie as anti-choice. That is a huge paranoia of mine. I've never really thought about revisiting the film — it kind of feels like something that should stay preserved in amber. But I would rather have this account be out there than [my] silence being misinterpreted".

=== Top ten lists ===
The film appeared on critics' top ten lists of the best films of 2007:

- 1st – Roger Ebert, Chicago Sun-Times
- 1st – Paste magazine staff
- 2nd – USCCB Office for Film and Broadcasting (tied with Bella)
- 3rd – David Germain, Associated Press
- 3rd – Moviefone staff
- 4th – James Berardinelli, ReelViews
- 4th – Richard Roeper, Chicago Sun-Times
- 6th – Claudia Puig, USA Today
- 6th – Desson Thomson, The Washington Post
- 6th – Joe Morgenstern, The Wall Street Journal
- 6th – Liam Lacey and Rick Groen, The Globe and Mail
- 6th – Marc Savlov, The Austin Chronicle
- 7th – Corina Chocano, Los Angeles Times
- 7th – Carrie Rickey, The Philadelphia Inquirer
- 10th – A. O. Scott, The New York Times (tied with Knocked Up and Superbad)
- 10th – Peter Travers, Rolling Stone (tied with Knocked Up)
- 10th – Stephen Holden, The New York Times

=== Accolades ===
Juno received nominations at the 80th Academy Awards for Best Picture, Best Director for Reitman, Best Actress for Page, and won Best Original Screenplay for Cody. In 2021, members of Writers Guild of America West (WGAW) and Writers Guild of America, East (WGAE) ranked its screenplay 24th in WGA’s 101 Greatest Screenplays of the 21st Century (so far).

Reitman expressed disappointment that Juno was ruled ineligible for the Genie Award nominations:

It's a Canadian director, Canadian stars, Canadian cast, Canadian crew, shot in Canada—how are we not eligible for a Genie when David Cronenberg's film [Eastern Promises] about Russians living in London shot in England with a British crew and British cast is eligible? I'm sorry, but somebody is going to have to explain that to me.

Sara Morton, the head of the Academy of Canadian Cinema and Television, issued a statement explaining that the film had never been submitted for Genie Award consideration by its studio. The Hollywood Reporter explained that Genie rules define Canadian films as financed at least in part by Canadian sources, and because American companies Mandate Pictures and Fox Searchlight were the sole funders, Juno was ineligible. Nonetheless, Genie spokesman Chris McDowall said that while the film was not evaluated for eligibility since it was not submitted, "Financing is one of the criteria, but it's not everything." Despite this, the film was eligible for the 2008 Canadian Comedy Awards, receiving two wins from three nominations.

== Soundtrack ==
Juno's soundtrack, Music from the Motion Picture Juno, was released digitally on December 11, 2007, and was later released in the United States on January 15, 2008. It features nineteen songs from Barry Louis Polisar, Belle & Sebastian, Buddy Holly, Cat Power, the Kinks, Mott the Hoople, Sonic Youth and the Velvet Underground, and most prominently Kimya Dawson and her former bands the Moldy Peaches and Antsy Pants. Under the Rhino Entertainment record label, it became the first number one soundtrack since the Dreamgirls soundtrack, 20th Century Fox's first number one soundtrack since the Titanic soundtrack, and Rhino's first number one album, topping the American Billboard 200 music charts in its fourth week of release.

Rhino announced in March 2008 that Juno B-Sides: Almost Adopted Songs would be available through digital-only release, a second volume of songs that were considered for but not included in the film. The fifteen tracks include songs by previously featured artists Kimya Dawson, Barry Louis Polisar, Belle & Sebastian and Buddy Holly, as well as Astrud Gilberto, The Bristols, Jr. James & The Late Guitar, Trio Los Panchos, Yo La Tengo and Page singing "Zub Zub", written by Diablo Cody as part of the script in a deleted scene. Rhino also released a Deluxe Edition, on November 25, 2008, containing both the original soundtrack as well as B-Sides in a two-disc set, along with storyboards from the film and additional liner notes from Reitman.
