= Juno (soundtrack) =

Soundtrack album by various artists
- Released: December 11, 2007
- Recorded: 2004–2007
- Length: 46:42
- Label: Rhino Entertainment
- Producer: Various

Juno: Music from the Motion Picture is the soundtrack for the 2007 film Juno. The album compiles mostly indie rock songs from the 2000s, and was released by Rhino Entertainment on December 11, 2007. It received enough critical and commercial success that other compilations and expanded re-releases have been released in subsequent years.

== Background ==
The album features several songs performed by Kimya Dawson and her bands Antsy Pants and the Moldy Peaches, due to a suggestion by lead actor Elliot Page:

At one point, I [director Jason Reitman] asked [Elliot] Page before we started shooting, 'What do you think Juno listens to?' And [they] said, 'The Moldy Peaches.' [They] went on my computer, played the songs, and I fell in love with it. [Screenwriter Diablo Cody] and I discussed putting a Moldy Peaches song in it where the characters would sing to each other. I got in touch with Kimya Dawson of The Moldy Peaches and she started sending me her work, which was beautiful, and that became a lot of the soundtrack.

Initially, Reitman conceived of the character being a fan of glam rock, but rejected it as too inauthentic. He replaced this by scoring the film with Yo La Tengo, but got into contact with Dawson after listening to "Anyone Else but You". Dawson insisted on seeing the screenplay before allowing her songs to be in the film, after which she agreed to send Reitman a package of her solo albums to review.

The Michael Cera/Elliot Page cover of "Anyone Else but You" was recorded on the last day of filming on the streets of Vancouver, British Columbia. During rehearsal, Dawson coached the duo on how to perform it and thought "'Aw, man, they sing it better than us.' They sing it so cute."

== Track listing ==
1. Barry Louis Polisar – "All I Want Is You" (2:37)
2. Kimya Dawson – "My Rollercoaster" (0:53)
3. The Kinks – "A Well Respected Man" (2:43)
4. Buddy Holly – "(Ummm, Oh Yeah) Dearest" (1:53)
5. Mateo Messina – "Up the Spout" (0:53)
6. Kimya Dawson – "Tire Swing" (3:07)
7. Belle & Sebastian – "Piazza, New York Catcher" (3:01)
8. Kimya Dawson – "Loose Lips" (2:24)
9. Sonic Youth – "Superstar" (4:06)
10. Kimya Dawson – "Sleep" (0:53)
11. Belle & Sebastian – "Expectations" (3:35)
12. Mott the Hoople – "All the Young Dudes" (3:35)
13. Kimya Dawson – "So Nice So Smart" (2:47)
14. Cat Power – "Sea of Love" (2:23)
15. Kimya Dawson and Antsy Pants – "Tree Hugger" (3:14)
16. The Velvet Underground – "I'm Sticking with You" (2:29)
17. The Moldy Peaches – "Anyone Else but You" (2:59)
18. Antsy Pants – "Vampire" (1:20)
19. Michael Cera and Elliot Page (Note: Credited as Ellen Page) – "Anyone Else but You" (1:56)

== Songs used in the film and promotion ==
The following songs appear in the film, but are not present on the soundtrack album:

- The Moldy Peaches – "Anyone Else But You"
- Kimya Dawson – "I Like Giants"
- Kimya Dawson – "Reminders of Then"
- Kimya Dawson – "12/26"
- The Drop. – "Why Bother"
- Heart – "Crazy on You"
- Hole – "Doll Parts"

The songs "Once I Loved" by Astrud Gilberto and "Besame Mucho" by Trio Los Panchos were included in the film, but not on the main soundtrack. Both selections would later appear on Juno B-Sides: Almost Adopted Songs.

In addition to some incidental score, the following were used in the trailers for the film, but do not appear on the soundtrack or in the movie itself:

- The Boy Least Likely To – "Be Gentle with Me"
- The Hoosiers – "Goodbye Mr A"
- Boy Kill Boy – "Suzie"
- Belle & Sebastian – "She's Losing It"
- Oh No! Oh My! – "The Party Punch" (used in marketing for the DVD release)
- The White Stripes – "We're Going to Be Friends"

== Critical reception and sales chart performance ==
Professional ratings
Review scores
Source	Rating
Allmusic	3/5 stars
The Guardian	Positive link
Robert Christgau	(choice cut)

The soundtrack debuted at number eight on the American Billboard 200 after its first week of release, climbing to number three and number two in the following weeks. In the issue dated February 9, 2008, the album hit number one, with 65,000 copies sold. After being number 1 for one week, it dropped to number 2. The album has since become a platinum record in the U.S. selling over 1,000,000 copies.

It is the first soundtrack to top the albums chart in the U.S. since the High School Musical 2 soundtrack the prior September, and the first number-one album for the Rhino label. It was the first number one soundtrack for a 20th Century Fox movie since Titanic in 1997.

== Juno B-Sides: Almost Adopted Songs ==
Elliot Page as Juno MacGuff on the cover of Juno B-Sides.

On April 8, 2008, a second soundtrack was released exclusively through the iTunes Store called Juno B-Sides: Almost Adopted Songs. It contains songs that were originally slated for the film, including a version of the 20th Century Fox Fanfare by Kimya Dawson and Mateo Messina originally planned to be used before "The Simpsons beat [them] to it" (referring to how The Simpsons Movie begins with Ralph Wiggum singing along with the fanfare) and a song sung by Juno (Elliot Page) in a deleted scene from the movie. It was released to other digital music providers on May 13, 2008, and was available as disc two of the deluxe edition soundtrack on November 18, 2008.

1. Kimya Dawson – "Twentieth Century Fox Fanfare" (0:20)
2. Barry Louis Polisar – "Me and You" (2:16)
3. Belle & Sebastian – "My Wandering Days Are Over" (5:24)
4. Mateo Messina – "Go Fly a Kite" (0:49)
5. Kimya Dawson – "Viva la Persistence" (3:47)
6. The Bristols – "Little Baby" (2:16)
7. Jr. James & The Late Guitar – "I'm into Something Good" (3:27)
8. Mateo Messina – "Meet the MacGuffs" (0:54)
9. Astrud Gilberto – "Once I Loved" (2:13)
10. Kimya Dawson – "All I Want Is You" (2:31)
11. Buddy Holly – "Learning the Game" (2:02)
12. Mateo Messina – "The Lorings" (1:25)
13. Trio Los Panchos – "Bésame Mucho" (3:01)
14. Yo La Tengo – "You Can Have It All" (4:36)
15. Elliot Page – "Zub Zub" (1:09)

== Deluxe Edition Soundtrack ==
Rhino Records released a two-disc deluxe edition of the Juno soundtrack on November 18, 2008, which contains all tracks from the original soundtrack, as well as the material available currently on B-Sides. This version has a modified cover with green stripes instead of orange.

== Juno's Mix CD ==
Initial DVD copies of the film purchased at Wal-Mart came with a sampler CD entitled Juno's Mix CD. It contains material found on Juno B-Sides: Almost Adopted Songs and one B-Side exclusive.

1. Mateo Messina – "Meet the MacGuffs"
2. Astrud Gilberto – "Once I Loved"
3. Mateo Messina – "Loring Bathroom" (Exclusive to this CD)
4. Belle & Sebastian – "My Wandering Days Are Over"
5. Mateo Messina – "Meet the Lorings" (Found on Juno B-Sides: Almost Adopted Songs under the title "The Lorings")

== Production personnel ==
- Peter Afterman – production
- Danielle Bond – soundtrack director
- Reggie Collins – project assistant
- Amy Driscoll – supervisor
- Nikki Fair – project assistant
- Dan Hersch – mastering
- Robert Kraft – executive
- Alison Litton – coordination
- Joshua Petker – art supervisor
- Jason Reitman – production, liner notes
- Liuba Shapiro – product manager
- Garrett Smith – art direction
- Margaret Yen – production

== Charts ==
=== Weekly charts ===
Chart (2007–2008)	Peak position
Australian Albums (ARIA)	5
Austrian Albums (Ö3 Austria)	34
Canadian Albums (Billboard)	1
French Albums (SNEP)	54
German Albums (Offizielle Top 100)	81
New Zealand Albums (RMNZ)	13
Spanish Albums (Promusicae)	96
Swiss Albums (Schweizer Hitparade)	100
US Billboard 200	1
US Soundtrack Albums (Billboard)	1

=== Year-end charts ===
Chart (2008)	Position
Australian Albums (ARIA)	68
US Billboard 200	40
US Soundtrack Albums (Billboard)	6

Chart (2009)	Position
US Soundtrack Albums (Billboard)	22

== Certifications ==
Region	Certification	Certified units/sales
Australia (ARIA)	Gold	35,000^{^}
United Kingdom (BPI)	Gold	100,000^{*}
United States (RIAA)	Platinum	1,000,000^{^}
^{*} Sales figures based on certification alone.^{^} Shipments figures based on certification alone.

== Release history ==
Year	Format	Label	Catalog Number
2007	DL	Rhino	410236
2008	LP	Rhino	432700
2008	CD	Rhino	410236
