= Toby Goodshank =

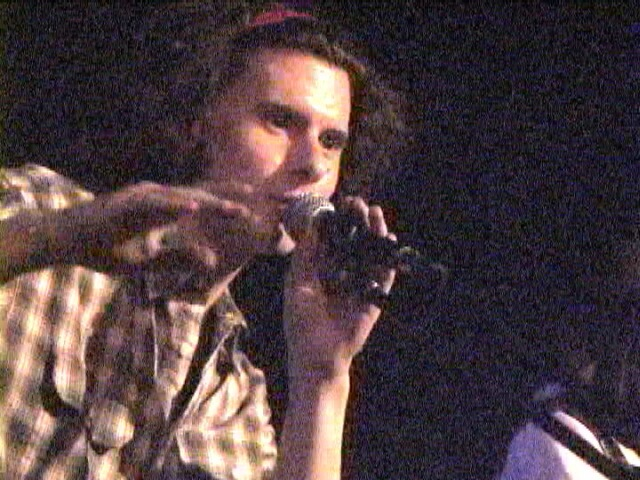
- Toby Goodshank in 2002

Background information
- Genres: Anti-folk
- Occupation: Musician
- Instruments: Vocals, Guitars

Toby Goodshank is a musician and visual artist based out of New York City. In addition to his solo work, he performs regularly with New York City-based bands Double Deuce, the Tri-Lambs, and the Christian Pirate Puppets.

== Biography ==
Toby Goodshank, born Dominick Carlucci, was raised in Newtown, Conn., and is an American musician, singer, and songwriter. Toby Goodshank made his high-profile musical debut playing acoustic guitar in The Moldy Peaches. He has a prolific solo career, recording 14 albums in a five-year span and touring Europe with artists including Jeffrey Lewis and Kimya Dawson. He has since become a prominent voice in the underground NYC music scene.

Goodshank is also adept at pen-and-ink drawing, and usually designs packaging for his records. He has written a number of comics, and has designed merchandise and cover art for several other artists.

== Style ==
Goodshank's style, while usually centered on his solo guitar and singing abilities, draws from a variety of pop and underground art and musical influences and employs many instrumental textures. Unconventional song structures, humor, innuendo, and wordplay are staples of his music and artwork across the variety of forms they take.

== Records ==
Many of Goodshank's records have been self-produced and distributed on home-pressed CD-Rs. In 2003, he founded a small record label called Unicornsounds. Cover and liner art is usually his own.

=== Partial discography ===
- untitled (10 year anniversary edition) (2019)
- Dream on Me (2018)
- Piper Laurie (2014)
- Minus Días (2013)
- Preston Spurlock / Toby Goodshank split 7-inch record (2011)
- Truth Jump Fall (2011)
- Samuel Locke Ward / Toby Goodshank split 7-inch record (2011)
- Rumcock (2010)
- (Untitled album, with the phrases "Baked Naturals" and "Johnny's Democracy" on the front and back covers) (2009)
- Half-Broken, Grotty Books Shop (Split with O'Folk Brothers) (2008)
- Pray to You (2008)
- Toby Goodshank Triumphant (2007)
- Everything Intertwingles (2007)
- Di Santa Ragione (2006)
- Mogo On The Gogo (2006)
- Untitled Covers Album (2006)
- Fall Tour EP (with Schwervon!) (2006)
- Jyunsangatsu (2005)
- Come Correct (2004)
- Safe Harbour (2004)
- We Can Build You (2003)
- Helmic Regulator (2003)
- Put The Devil Where You Hang Your Hat (2002)
- Compound (2002)
- Follow Me If You Want To Fuck (2001)
- This Is For John Word (2001)
- Toby Goodshank Live @ Trash (2001)
- A Christmas Placation (with Crystal Madrilejos)
- Music for Heroes Vol. I: The Danger Vat (2002)
- Music for Heroes Vol. II: St. Leno, I Have No Prayer
- Music for Heroes Vol. III: A Chronicle of the Fear
- Music for Heroes Vol. IV (2005)
- Music for Heroes Vol. V (2007)

=== Compilation appearances ===
- I Killed the Monster: 21 Artists Performing the Songs of Daniel Johnston (2006) – "Now"
- The Art Star Sounds Compilation – "Sunny Sunny Cold Cold Day" 2005 [www.cdbaby.com/artstarsounds]
- Anticomp Folkilation (2007) – "Black Eye"
- Smooth Sounds: Various Artists Play the Future Hits of Wckr Spgt – "No Cheese For Porthos" 2010 – Shrimper
