= Texas Girls' Choir =

The Texas Girls' Choir is a nonprofit organization based in North Texas. About 100 girls, between ages 8 and 12, perform in the choir.

== About ==
The Texas Girls' Choir is made up of around 100 girls between the ages of 8 and 12 from the North Texas region. Rehearsals are held twice a week and the choir performs choreographed works, foreign-language songs and other programs.

The organization was founded in 1962 by Shirley Carter in Fort Worth, Texas. There had been many boys' choirs in the region, but no girls' choirs during the 1960s. The choir was fully integrated, during the time when segregation was legal, and included African-American girls from the beginning. The choir was first called the City Girls' Choir, and was incorporated in 1965 as the Texas Girls' Choir. It was the first girl's choir in the United States to be incorporated. The choir first performed in the Fort Worth downtown YWCA and later at the First Baptist Church. The group found a permanent home in 1973.

The choir has performed in over 46 countries. In 1970, the choir was invited to perform in Tel Aviv in the Tel Aviv Youth Center and also sang at the Mount of Beatitudes.

After Carter died, one of the original members of the first choir group, Debi Weir, took over as executive director in 2002. Weir had been working as the administrative assistant since 1980. Weir died in 2015.
