= Anyone Else but You =

Single by the Moldy Peaches

from the album The Moldy Peaches
- Released: 2001; 2008 (single re-release)
- Genre: Anti-folk; indie folk; acoustic
- Length: 2:59
- Label: Sanctuary; Rough Trade
- Songwriters: Kimya Dawson; Adam Green

"Anyone Else but You" is a song by the indie rock duo the Moldy Peaches, first released on their 2001 self-titled album. The song achieved wider popularity after being featured on the soundtrack of the 2007 film Juno, along with several other songs by Kimya Dawson that she wrote for her toddler. A version is also performed by the two main characters (Elliot Page and Michael Cera) at the end of the film. The Page and Cera version of the song was a minor chart success in the United States, reaching #91 on the Billboard Hot 100 in January 2008.

The song lyrics "up up down down left right left right B A start" refer to the Konami Code, a commonly used sequence to enable cheat codes in video games.

== In popular culture ==
- The song is featured in the 2005 documentary film Murderball.
- A spoof of the song is performed in the 2008 film Disaster Movie by Crista Flanagan.
- In the 30 Rock episode "Secret Santa", Liz Lemon sings a parody of the song as a Christmas gift for Jack Donaghy.
