= J.P. Morgan Saves the Nation =

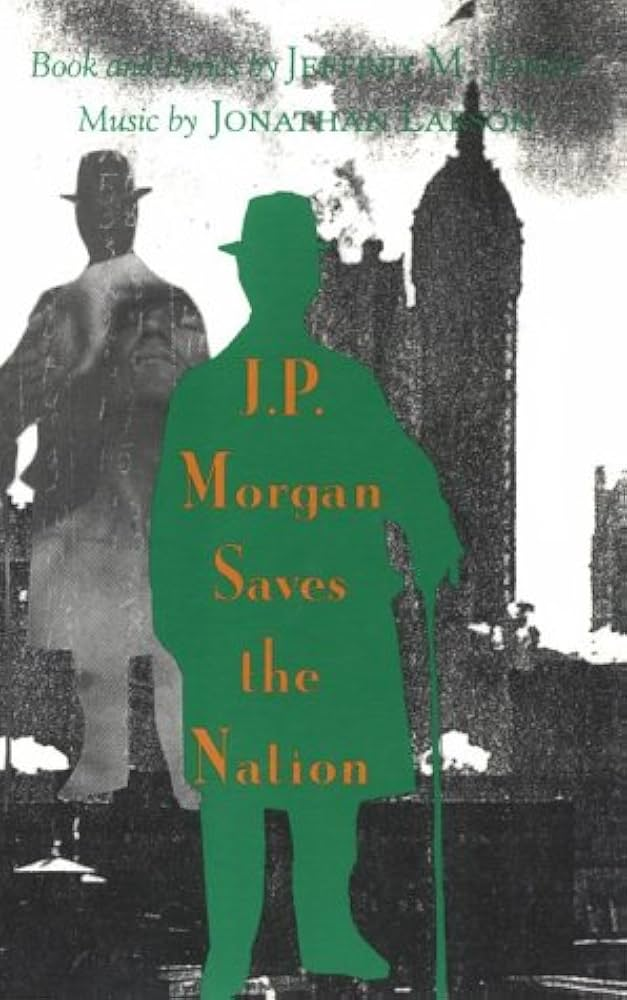
- Cover of the published script
- Music: Jonathan Larson
- Lyrics: Jonathan Larson
- Book: Jeffrey M. Jones
- Basis: The life and times of J.P. Morgan
- Premiere: June 6, 1995: Federal Hall Manhattan

J.P. Morgan Saves the Nation is a 1995 musical with book and lyrics by Jeffrey M. Jones and music by Jonathan Larson.

Jonathan Larson was invited to compose music for En Garde Arts‘s production of Jeffrey M. Jones’ J.P. Morgan Saves the Nation, a postmodern work detailing the life of financier J. P. Morgan. Larson was called in as a replacement as Jones' long-time collaborator, Dan Moses Schreier, dropped out, suggested by artistic director Annie Hamburger after hearing a recording of the workshop production of Rent at New York Theatre Workshop.

== Development ==
Ron Chernow's The House of Morgan was a major historical source for the team during development.

The score for J.P. Morgan contains "Larson’s musical recipe" including classic composer John Philip Sousa, soul, Seattle-inspired music, and electric-guitar-heavy grunge. Meanwhile, Entertainment Weekly described it as a "ragtime-to-rock satire". Larson not only wrote new songs for the show but re-worked some of his older songs, particularly "Greenback Dollars," "Jack O'Diamonds," and "Run that Railroad" (which had its origins in an early song for RENT).

The show was staged at the "pointedly appropriate setting" of the Federal Hall National Memorial on Wall Street, which was across the street from the Morgan Guaranty Trust Company, founded by the titular character. Due to the nature of the location, background checks were performed on the actors.

== Story ==
The show takes place outdoors on the famous steps of Federal Hall National Memorial, in New York City's financial district, at Wall and Broad Streets. The New York Stock Exchange can be seen nearby. The old J.P. Morgan & Co. building is behind where the audience sits. A large statue of George Washington, which is part of the memorial, is also a key part of the scene.

The story begins as Uncle Sam tells the audience how J.P. Morgan played a key part in stopping the Panic of 1907 by using his own money. Then, the "All-American Businessmen" appear, singing praises for Morgan and capitalism ("All-American Businessman").

George Washington and Lady Liberty, who represent America's founding ideals, are shown as Morgan's symbolic parents. Washington complains that he is becoming less important and that past heroes are being forgotten. Liberty introduces the baby Morgan as the nation's future savior, but she accidentally drops him. Washington tries to calm her. Washington, acting as a strict father, insists Morgan go to boarding school to become a banker. Liberty misses her son, reflecting on his absence ("I Loved a Sailor"). Even though Morgan comes back sick, Washington continues to be strict, as Morgan leaves for university in Switzerland.

After finishing his education, Morgan meets his symbolic parents again in London. He finds Washington in business with George Peabody, and Liberty seems mentally unwell, showing signs of dementia. When Morgan argues with Washington about Liberty's condition, he is caned ("The Beating/I Loved a Sailor").

Morgan returns to America just as the Civil War starts. Uncle Sam tries to get him to join the army, but Washington stops this by paying for someone else to fight in Morgan's place, saying Morgan is meant for more important things. Washington sets Morgan up in business in Manhattan, where Morgan dreams of doing good for everyone ("There’s An Office Down There"). Washington warns him to be wary of dishonest people.

Soon, Morgan meets a character who represents 19th Century Market Capitalism (called "the Devil"), who tempts him. Morgan accepts, and the market is flooded with paper money ("Greenback Dollars")—an early kind of quantitative easing. While business owners make money, Uncle Sam has trouble getting weapons for the Union Army. Morgan arranges loans so private companies can buy old weapons and sell them to the army for a higher price. Although he doesn't do the deals himself, Liberty and Washington criticize him for making profits this way. The Devil encourages Morgan to enjoy luxury ("Get All You Want"), but Morgan falls for Amelia Sturges, a wealthy woman who has tuberculosis. Morgan’s money cannot save her, and she dies ("The Woman Died"). This causes him to shut off his feelings and focus only on work.

Uncle Sam talks about the economic problems after the Civil War, when paper money was worth very little. Morgan suggests taking this devalued money out of use. However, the Devil suggests a plan to use this worthless money to buy equally worthless stock. This causes the market to boom and starts the era of powerful railroad owners ("Run That Railroad").

In a dramatic scene, Liberty acts as a small, weak railroad, and the Devil acts as a greedy Wall Street businessman. Morgan saves Liberty's company with an important loan and gets a seat on its board. This part ends with Liberty becoming Morgan's symbolic second wife ("Susquehanna War").

Morgan travels to Egypt and has a religious awakening. At the same time, his bank buys up many failing railroads. He returns to find his investments in a risky situation and sends his agents to fix or save these businesses ("He Don’t Know How"). Other railroad owners use cruel methods to compete. Morgan and Washington try to create a deal, with Morgan as the judge, which stops the fighting for a short time before it starts again ("Gentleman’s Agreement").

After Washington leaves the story, Morgan gets a series of telegrams from Liberty, delivered out of order, telling him that his father (Washington) has died in an accident. Morgan reacts angrily, rejects her comfort, saying he knows he is unlikeable, and turns away her attempts to reconnect ("Your Loving Wife"). The Devil then successfully gets him back into the stock market ("Little Jack O’ Diamonds").

In a short break from the main story, Uncle Sam breaks character, yelling at the stagehands and daring the audience to leave if they don't like his abuse.

Morgan hosts a large dinner in his father’s honor, feeling a new freedom to satisfy his desires for wealth, art, and old treasures ("Appetite Annie"). At this dinner, he finds out that Uncle Sam has been spending the government's gold, nearly making the U.S. bankrupt. After a tense argument, Sam allows Morgan to arrange the sale of government bonds abroad, and Morgan personally promises to back these bonds ("The Bailout").

The Devil returns, appearing as a rival railroad owner, E.H. Harriman (who also represents John D. Rockefeller), to block Morgan's attempt to buy a major railroad. Their aggressive buying of stocks causes a widespread market panic. Morgan wins this fight but causes a lot of financial trouble.

Dressed as a preacher, Liberty compares the U.S. economy to the Israelites in the desert, whose greed (risky investments) caused the Panic of 1907 ("The Panic"). As banks are about to fail, Morgan at first refuses to help. However, when the New York Stock Exchange is about to collapse, he is forced to give a $25 million check himself, stopping the market from completely crashing ("Hold On To Your Money").

To celebrate, Morgan opens a public library to show his large collections. His speech is interrupted by Liberty, who is now a beggar. Morgan sends her away but feels a moment of guilt. Liberty laments Morgan's lost good spirit, as he is surrounded by photographers ("I See A Man") .

Later, Uncle Sam officially calls Morgan to a congressional hearing about how much wealth he controls. Morgan claims he doesn't know all the small details of his business, saying his actions helped the country. Uncle Sam and George Washington do not believe him. When Morgan says his business empire is too complicated for the government to break up, Washington criticizes him for not doing it himself. After the committee finishes, the Devil explains that the hearing was a "show trial," meant to calm the public and teach Morgan a lesson about his actions.

In the end, an old Morgan says he is still ready to help his country, even though his reputation is permanently ruined. The Devil suggests Morgan try to change his image, but Morgan knows he is going to die. He decides to retire to Egypt, admitting the Devil ultimately won, but hoping history will remember the good things he did ("Sail On").

== Songs ==
1. "All-American Businessman"
2. "J.P. Morgan" (Note: Dropped from the show after April, 1995.)
3. "I Loved A Sailor"
4. "The Beating/I Loved A Sailor"
5. "There's An Office Down There" (Note: Only used in versions of the show written after April, 1995, and does not appear in the published script.)
6. "Greenback Dollars"
7. "Get All You Want"
8. "The Woman Died"
9. "Run That Railroad"
10. "Susquehanna War"
11. "He Don't Know How"
12. "Gentleman's Agreement"
13. "Telegrams"
14. "Your Loving Wife"/ "Little Jack O'Diamonds" (Note: Performed in counterpoint.)
15. "Appetite Annie"
16. "The Bailout"
17. "The Panic"
18. "Hold On To Your Money"
19. "I See A Man"
20. "Proceedings"
21. "Sail On"

== Cast and Crew ==
=== Production Team ===
- Director: Jean Randich
- Choreographer: Doug Elkins

=== Principal Cast ===
- James Judy as J. Pierpont Morgan (A Banker)
- Stephen DeRosa as Uncle Sam (A National Symbol)
- Buzz Bovshow as G. Washington, Esq. (A Father)
- Julie Fain Lawrence as Liberty (A Mother)
- Robin Miles as 19th Century Market Capitalism (A Devil)

=== Ensemble ===
==== All American Businesspersons ====
- Bobby Baker
- Celim A. Caton
- Tim Cusick
- Jimmy Hurley
- Marc J. Parees
- Neil David Seibel
- Bill Torres

==== Greenback Dollars ====
- Sara Allen
- Heidi K. Eklund
- Ira Goyne
- Raquel Hecker
- Michelle Kelly
- Christina Knight
- Carla Matero
- Judy Mills
- Jennifer Sencion
- Lauren Slaiman

==== A Wall Street Choir ====
- Jesse Green
- Moira Haupt
- Dina Ipavic
- Christopher King
- Deborah Latz
- Dana Lynn McLeod
- James Powers (II)
- Ted Powers
- Julia Ryan
- David Salper
- DeWayne Snype
- Secor Upson

== Critical reception ==
According to The Atlantic, J.P. Morgan Saves the Nation, along with Larson's other shows Superbia and Tick, Tick... Boom!, "opened and closed quickly, in out-of-the-way venues". The New York Times noted the piece's "intricate, even esoteric book...obviously the product of many hours of library research" and "peppy score in a post-modernist medley of musical voices".

Reviews were mixed to negative, despite a positive review from Ben Brantley at The New York Times, and the show closed a week early.
