= Ira Weitzman =

American theatre editor and producer

Ira Weitzman is an American musical theatre dramaturge and producer. He was the creator and first director of the Musical Theater Program at Playwrights Horizons from 1978 and at Lincoln Center Theater (LCT) from 1992. He also served as associate producer of musical theater at both institutions.

Weitzman was involved in the development of the following productions:

- William Finn and James Lapine's Falsettos trilogy
- Lynn Ahrens and Stephen Flaherty's Lucky Stiff and Once on This Island
- Tom Cone, Ellen Fitzhugh, and Skip Kennon's Herringbone
- George C. Wolfe's New York theater debut, Paradise!
- Stephen Sondheim and James Lapine's Sunday in the Park with George, Into the Woods, and Passion
- Stephen Sondheim and John Weidman's Assassins
- Jeanine Tesori and Brian Crawley's Violet
- Kirsten Childs' The Bubbly Black Girl Sheds Her Chameleon Skin
- James Valcq and Fred Alley's The Spitfire Grill
- Ricky Ian Gordon and Richard Nelson's My Life with Albertine
- Michael John LaChiusa's Hello Again, Marie Christine, and Bernarda Alba
- The 1994 revival of Rodgers and Hammerstein's Carousel
- Graciela Daniele, Jim Lewis, Michael John LaChiusa, and Bob Telson's Chronicle of a Death Foretold
- William Finn and James Lapine's A New Brain
- Susan Stroman and John Weidman's Contact
- Lynn Ahrens, Stephen Flaherty, and Terrence McNally's A Man of No Importance
- Alfred Uhry and Jason Robert Brown's Parade
- William Finn's Elegies
- Burt Shevelove, Nathan Lane, and Stephen Sondheim's The Frogs
- Martha Clarke and Charles L. Mee's Belle Époque
- Lynn Ahrens and Stephen Flaherty's Dessa Rose and The Glorious Ones
- Adam Guettel and Craig Lucas's The Light in the Piazza

From 2008 to the present, Weitzman has been the Mindich Musical Theater Producer at LCT, overseeing the development and production of the Tony Award-winning revival of Rodgers and Hammerstein's South Pacific as well as The King and I, Lerner and Loewe's My Fair Lady and the 2016 Broadway revival of Finn and Lapine's Falsettos. During this period, he also developed new musicals including:

- Clay by Matt Sax and Eric Rosen, which inaugurated LCT3
- Dogfight by Benj Pasek, Justin Paul, and Peter Duchan
- Women on the Verge of a Nervous Breakdown by Davis Yazbek and Jeffrey Lane
- Happiness by Susan Stroman, John Weidman, Michael Korie, and Scott Frankel
- A Minister's Wife by Austin Pendleton, Joshua Schmidt, and Jan Tranen
- Preludes by Dave Malloy and Rachel Chavkin
- Flying Over Sunset by James Lapine, Tom Kitt, and Michael Korie
- The Gardens of Anuncia by Michael John LaChiusa and Graciela Daniele

Weitzman produced the revival of Moss Hart and Irving Berlin's As Thousands Cheer for Drama Dept, was line producer and dramaturge for the first post-Broadway revival of Sondheim and Furth's Merrily We Roll Along directed by Lapine at the La Jolla Playhouse, and was the production coordinator for the world premiere of Into the Woods at the Old Globe.

As a concert producer, Weitzman was Artistic Director of WBAI-FM's Free Music Store, The Writers Cabaret at NY's West Bank Café under the auspices of Playwrights Horizons, the first Artistic Director of City Center's Encores! and the inaugural producer of Lincoln Center's American Songbook concert series.

In 2009, Ira Weitzman received the Lucille Lortel Award for Sustained Excellence in Off-Broadway Theater.

== In popular culture ==
Weitzman's time as head of musical theatre at Playwrights Horizons is depicted in the 2021 film adaptation of Jonathan Larson's musical Tick, Tick... Boom!, where he is portrayed by Jonathan Marc Sherman.
