= Tick, Tick... Boom! (film) =

2021 film by Lin-Manuel Miranda

- Release poster
- Directed by: Lin-Manuel Miranda
- Screenplay by: Steven Levenson
- Based on: Tick, Tick... Boom! by Jonathan Larson
- Produced by: Brian Grazer; Ron Howard; Julie Oh; Julie Larson; Lin-Manuel Miranda
- Starring: Andrew Garfield; Alexandra Shipp; Robin de Jesús; Joshua Henry; Judith Light; Vanessa Hudgens
- Cinematography: Alice Brooks
- Edited by: Myron Kerstein; Andrew Weisblum
- Music by: Jonathan Larson
- Production companies: Imagine Entertainment; 5000 Broadway Productions
- Distributed by: Netflix
- Release dates: November 10, 2021 (AFI Fest); November 12, 2021 (United States)
- Running time: 121 minutes
- Country: United States
- Language: English
- Box office: $115,585

Tick, Tick... Boom! (also stylized as tick, tick... BOOM!) is a 2021 American biographical musical drama film directed by Lin-Manuel Miranda in his feature directorial debut. Written by Steven Levenson, who also serves as an executive producer, it is based on the stage musical of the same name by Jonathan Larson, a semi-autobiographical story about Larson writing a musical to enter into the theater industry. The film stars Andrew Garfield as Larson, alongside Robin de Jesús, Alexandra Shipp, Joshua Henry, Judith Light, and Vanessa Hudgens.

Tick, Tick... Boom! had its world premiere at the AFI Fest on November 10, 2021, and began a limited theatrical release two days later, before streaming on Netflix on November 19. The film received positive reviews for Garfield's performance, the editing, and Miranda's direction. It was named one of the best films of 2021 by the American Film Institute, and was nominated for Best Motion Picture - Musical or Comedy at the 79th Golden Globe Awards, Best Picture at the 27th Critics' Choice Awards, as well as Best Film Editing at the 94th Academy Awards. For his performance, Garfield won the Golden Globe Award for Best Actor in a Motion Picture – Musical or Comedy, and was nominated as Best Actor for the Academy Award, Actor Award for Outstanding Performance by a Male Actor in a Leading Role, and Critics' Choice Movie Award for Best Actor.

== Plot ==
In 1992, Jonathan Larson performs his rock monologue Tick, Tick... Boom! at New York Theatre Workshop, accompanied by friends Roger and Karessa. He describes a constant ticking noise he hears in his head and begins to tell the story of the events leading to his 30th birthday. An unseen narrator explains the film is the true story of Larson, "except for the parts Jonathan made up."

In early 1990, Jonathan juggles work at the Moondance Diner in SoHo while preparing for a workshop of his musical and passion project Superbia. He feels pressure to be successful before he turns 30: with his birthday just over a week away, he sees the workshop as his last chance ("30/90"). Jonathan has a party at home with friends, including his former roommate Michael, his girlfriend Susan, and fellow waiters Freddy and Carolyn ("Boho Days"). Susan tells Jonathan about a teaching job at Jacob's Pillow and asks him to come. Michael, who previously left theater for a lucrative advertising career ("No More"), sees Susan's offer as an opportunity for Jonathan to consider a serious future and invites Jonathan to join an advertising focus group at his company. Jonathan's producer Ira asks him to write a new song for Superbia because the story needs it. This troubles him, as his idol Stephen Sondheim told him the same at a composing workshop some years ago ("LCD Readout"), but he can't come up with anything, and he only has a week.

Jonathan's anxieties over the workshop and Michael and Susan's offers ("Johnny Can't Decide") are compounded when he learns from Carolyn that Freddy, who is HIV-positive, has been hospitalized ("Sunday"). He chooses to prioritize the workshop ("Sextet Montage"), which leads to trouble in his personal life: Susan, frustrated by Jonathan's indecisiveness and obsession with his career, breaks up with him ("Therapy"), and he angers Michael when he deliberately sabotages the focus group. Michael accuses him of wasting the privilege to have a life with the person he loves—something Michael cannot do as a gay man in the AIDS crisis—for the sake of a financially unstable theater career. After receiving an encouraging call from his agent, Rosa, Jonathan tries to write the new song the night before the workshop, but his power gets cut off. He heads to a swimming pool to vent his frustrations before finally coming up with the new song ("Swimming").

At the workshop are friends, family, and industry professionals, including Sondheim ("Come to Your Senses"). Jonathan receives praise but no offers to produce Superbia. Rosa gives him a reality check that it will likely never be produced due to the content and production needs, so he must try again and hope something will stick, encouraging him to write about what he knows. Discouraged, Jonathan begs Michael for a corporate job, but Michael, having changed his mind after seeing the workshop, urges Jonathan to continue in musical theater, revealing he is HIV-positive ("Real Life"). Realizing that his career obsession has cost him Susan and harmed his friendship with Michael, Jonathan wanders through New York before finding himself at the Delacorte Theater. He finds a piano and reflects on his friendship with Michael and the sacrifices he must make for his career ("Why"). He and Michael reconcile.

On the morning of Jonathan's 30th birthday, Sondheim calls, congratulating him and wanting to talk more about Superbia, lifting his spirits. Holding his birthday party at the Moondance Diner, he is relieved to hear Freddy will be discharged from the hospital. Susan gifts him a blank sheet music book to help in his career, and they part on amicable terms. She narrates that his next project was Tick, Tick... Boom! before he returned to working on a previous project, which became Rent. Susan's narration reveals that Jonathan died of a sudden aortic dissection the night before Rent began previews Off-Broadway. She laments that though Rent brought the success Jonathan desired, he never got to experience it for himself, nor did he get to say everything he wanted to in his writing. In 1992, Jonathan performs the final song from Tick, Tick... Boom! as he optimistically looks to the future ("Louder Than Words").

== Cast ==
- Andrew Garfield as Jonathan Larson
- Alexandra Shipp as Susan Wilson, Jonathan's girlfriend, a former dancer (based on Janet Charleston)
- Robin de Jesús as Michael, Jonathan's best friend, who quit acting for an advertising career (based on Matt O'Grady)
- Vanessa Hudgens as Karessa Johnson, Jonathan's friend and a performer in Superbia and Tick, Tick... Boom!
- Joshua Henry as Roger Bart, (Note: Henry is credited as "Roger": Miranda confirmed the character is based on the real Bart, while Henry stated in a video published by Netflix that his character's full name is "Roger Bart.") Jonathan's friend and a performer in Superbia and Tick, Tick... Boom!
- Jonathan Marc Sherman as Ira Weitzman, Head of Musical Theatre at Playwrights Horizons and the producer of the Superbia workshop
- Michaela Jaé Rodriguez as Carolyn, a fellow waitress at the Moondance Diner and Jonathan's friend
- Ben Levi Ross as Freddy, a fellow waiter at the Moondance Diner and Jonathan's friend
- Judith Light as Rosa Stevens, Jonathan's agent (based on Flora Roberts)
- Bradley Whitford as Stephen Sondheim
  - The real Sondheim voices the answering machine message near the end of the film.
- Laura Benanti as Judy Wright, the head of the advertising focus group
- Danielle Ferland as Kim, a member of the advertising focus group
- Micaela Diamond as Peggy, a member of the advertising focus group
- Utkarsh Ambudkar as Todd, a member of the advertising focus group
- Gizel Jimenez as Cristin, a performer in the Superbia workshop
- Kate Rockwell as Lauren, a performer in the Superbia workshop
- Aneesa Folds as Danya, a performer in the Superbia workshop
- Joel Perez as Lincoln, a performer in the Superbia workshop
- Judy Kuhn as "Nan" (Nanette Larson), Jonathan's mother
- Danny Burstein as "Al" (Allan Larson), Jonathan's father
- Lauren Marcus as Donna, Jonathan's friend and videographer (based on Victoria Leacock Hoffman)
- Richard Kind as Walter Bloom, the head of the musical theater workshop
- Tariq Trotter as H.A.W.K. Smooth, a street rapper and working actor
- Ryan Vasquez as Scott, a friend of Roger's that he invites to Jonathan's party
- Joanna P. Adler as Molly, a Strand Bookstore clerk
- Jelani Alladin as David, Michael's partner
- Shockwave as a Building Doorman

=== Cameos ===
New York Theatre Workshop artistic director James C. Nicola and Roger Bart make credited appearances as "featured diners" at the Moondance Diner in the background of the opening scene. Both knew and worked with the real Larson: Nicola was in charge of New York Theatre Workshop at the time of the film's events and helped program Rent, while Bart was a close friend and frequent collaborator who contributed backing vocals to the original rock-monologue version of Tick, Tick... Boom!. The character "Roger", played by Joshua Henry, is loosely inspired by Bart.

The song "Sunday" features cameos from André De Shields, Bebe Neuwirth, Beth Malone, Brian Stokes Mitchell, Chita Rivera, Chuck Cooper, Howard McGillin, Joel Grey, Renée Elise Goldsberry, Phillipa Soo, Phylicia Rashad, and Bernadette Peters. It also prominently features Adam Pascal, Daphne Rubin-Vega, and Wilson Jermaine Heredia as homeless bums: all three were original cast members of the Broadway production of Rent, which was also written by Larson. Rubin-Vega's costume includes a pair of shoes she wore onstage in the original production of Rent, and a black hoodie which once belonged to Larson. Director Miranda also cameos as a cook at the Moondance Diner during the scene.

The musical theater workshop scene includes cameos by various established theater composers and lyricists as "aspiring composers and lyricists", including Alex Lacamoire, Amanda Green, Chad Beguelin, Jaime Lozano, Dave Malloy, Eisa Davis, Georgia Stitt, Grace McLean, Helen Park, Jason Robert Brown, Jeanine Tesori, Joe Iconis, Marc Shaiman, Matthew Sklar, Nick Blaemire, Quiara Alegría Hudes, Shaina Taub, Stephen Schwartz, Stephen Trask, screenwriter Steven Levenson, and Tom Kitt. Blaemire previously portrayed Jonathan Larson in the 2016 Off-Broadway revival of Tick, Tick... Boom!. Green, Beguelin, Malloy, Iconis, Sklar, and Taub are all previous recipients of the Jonathan Larson Grant for aspiring composers.

Several members of Miranda's hip-hop improv group Freestyle Love Supreme have roles throughout the film: besides Aneesa Folds and Utkarsh Ambudkar, Shockwave and Andrew "JellyDonut" Bancroft appear in "No More", and Christopher Jackson appears as a patron at the New York Theatre Workshop performance of Tick, Tick... Boom!. Miranda's father Luis A. Miranda Jr. cameos as a building concierge in "No More." Additionally, Janet Dacal, Kenita Miller, Eddy Lee and Jared Loftin appear as performers in the Superbia workshop. Although Whitford portrays Sondheim onscreen, Sondheim voices himself when he leaves a message on Jonathan's voicemail, as he does in the original musical. Miranda's wife Vanessa Nadal voices "Deborah", Susan's friend who calls Jonathan towards the beginning of the film about equipment for Susan's dance show. Anna Louizos, who designed the set for the 2001 Off-Broadway run of Tick, Tick... Boom!, and her wife Robyn Goodman, who co-produced the run and was friends with the real Larson, play Michelle and Gay respectively, Jonathan's neighbors who attend his party. Among the audience members in the final scene are Scott Schwartz, the director of the 2001 Off-Broadway production of Tick, Tick... Boom!, and Julie Larson, Larson's sister.

Anthony Rapp, Idina Menzel, and Fredi Walker-Browne appear via archive footage of the original production of Rent. Archival footage of the Japanese and Cuban productions are also used, the latter sourced from the 2019 documentary Revolution Rent.

A prop playbill for the workshop mentions Jace Alexander, Michael Lindsay, and Marin Mazzie as members of the cast. All three knew and worked with the real Larson, Alexander through the Naked Angels, Lindsay from their days at Adelphi University and at several Superbia workshops, and Mazzie as a Superbia cast member and collaborator on her and Larson's cabaret act "J. Glitz." It is not clear, however, if any of the performers in the onscreen workshop are actually meant to be these actors. These mentions could be considered memorials; by the time this movie was filmed, Mazzie and Lindsay had died, and though Alexander was still alive, he had not had a professional career since pleading guilty to charges relating to child pornography.

== Production ==
=== Background ===
Tick, Tick... Boom! began as a rock monologue titled 30/90 and later Boho Days that Larson wrote between 1989 and 1990 and first performed at Second Stage Theater from September 6–9, 1990. Boho Days was a semi-autobiographical work following a musical theater composer named "Jon" who tries to figure out his next project after a failed workshop of his musical Superbia, based on Larson's own experience in trying to get Superbia staged. Larson later rewrote it into Tick, Tick... Boom! which he performed at the Village Gate in November 1991, and later at New York Theatre Workshop's "O Solo Mio" Festivals in 1992 and 1993 before turning his attention to Rent. The piece changed significantly in this period, as it was written in response to events in Larson's life: the character of Susan notably changed with each iteration based on Larson's relationship with his real girlfriend Janet Charleston. Larson's friend and producer Victoria Leacock Hoffman recalled the work became increasingly pessimistic with Larson's increasing frustrations with his career.

Following Larson's death, Leacock Hoffman and Robyn Goodman recruited playwright David Auburn to transform the solo piece into a three person musical. Auburn reworked both the story and structure of Tick, Tick... Boom! while still attempting to preserve Larson's writing. Besides the addition of dialogue, one of Auburn's most significant contributions was the Superbia workshop plot (in all of Larson's versions of the script, the Superbia workshop took place before the events of the show). This change, besides giving a sense of plot progression, also provided the opportunity to include the previously unreleased song "Come to Your Senses", which was originally written for Superbia. J. Collis, the author of the oral history Boho Days: The Wider Works of Jonathan Larson, describes Auburn's changes as giving the musical a better dramaturgical structure, changing the show from a story about the artist's struggle—something which Larson's mentor Sondheim criticized the original rock monologue for being, feeling such a story was overdone—to one about making adult choices and dealing with the consequences. This production ran Off-Broadway at the Jane Street Theatre in 2001 and is arguably the version most familiar to audiences.

=== Development ===
Producer Julie Oh was first inspired to bring Tick, Tick... Boom! to the screen after seeing Lin-Manuel Miranda star in the 2014 production at New York City Center as part of Encores!. After viewing a New York Times article by Miranda about how Tick, Tick... Boom! inspired him when he saw the Off-Broadway production in 2001, she felt it was important for the story to become a film. Oh felt the only director who would be able to do so was Miranda, who immediately expressed interest after she reached out to him. Oh and Miranda began formal discussions about the film while he was in London filming Mary Poppins Returns.

The film was announced in July 2018 with the news that Miranda would make his directorial debut with the musical adaptation, with Imagine Entertainment and Julie Oh producing and Dear Evan Hansen's Steven Levenson penning the script. Miranda, Levenson, and Oh treated the process like creating a musical, including holding a secret workshop at the United Palace in Washington Heights on July 16, 2018. It was during this stage that Andrew Garfield joined the process, having finished his run in the Broadway revival of Angels in America the day before. The team set a production start date of March 2020, in order to give Miranda and Levenson time to conduct research, and for Garfield to take formal vocal and piano training.

By June 2019, Netflix had acquired the film, with Andrew Garfield the top choice to star. In January 2020, it was also announced that choreographer Ryan Heffington would be working on the film.

=== Writing ===
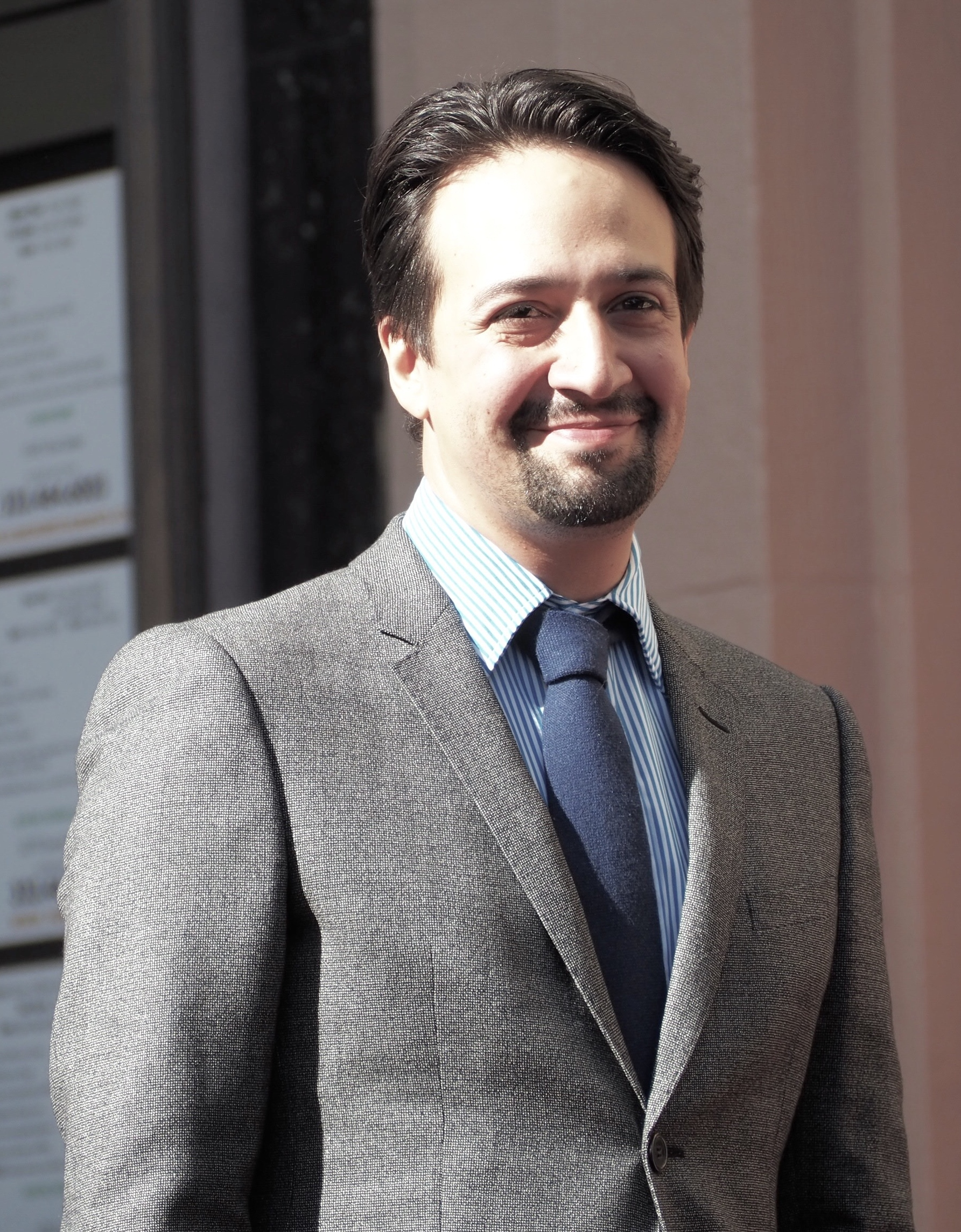
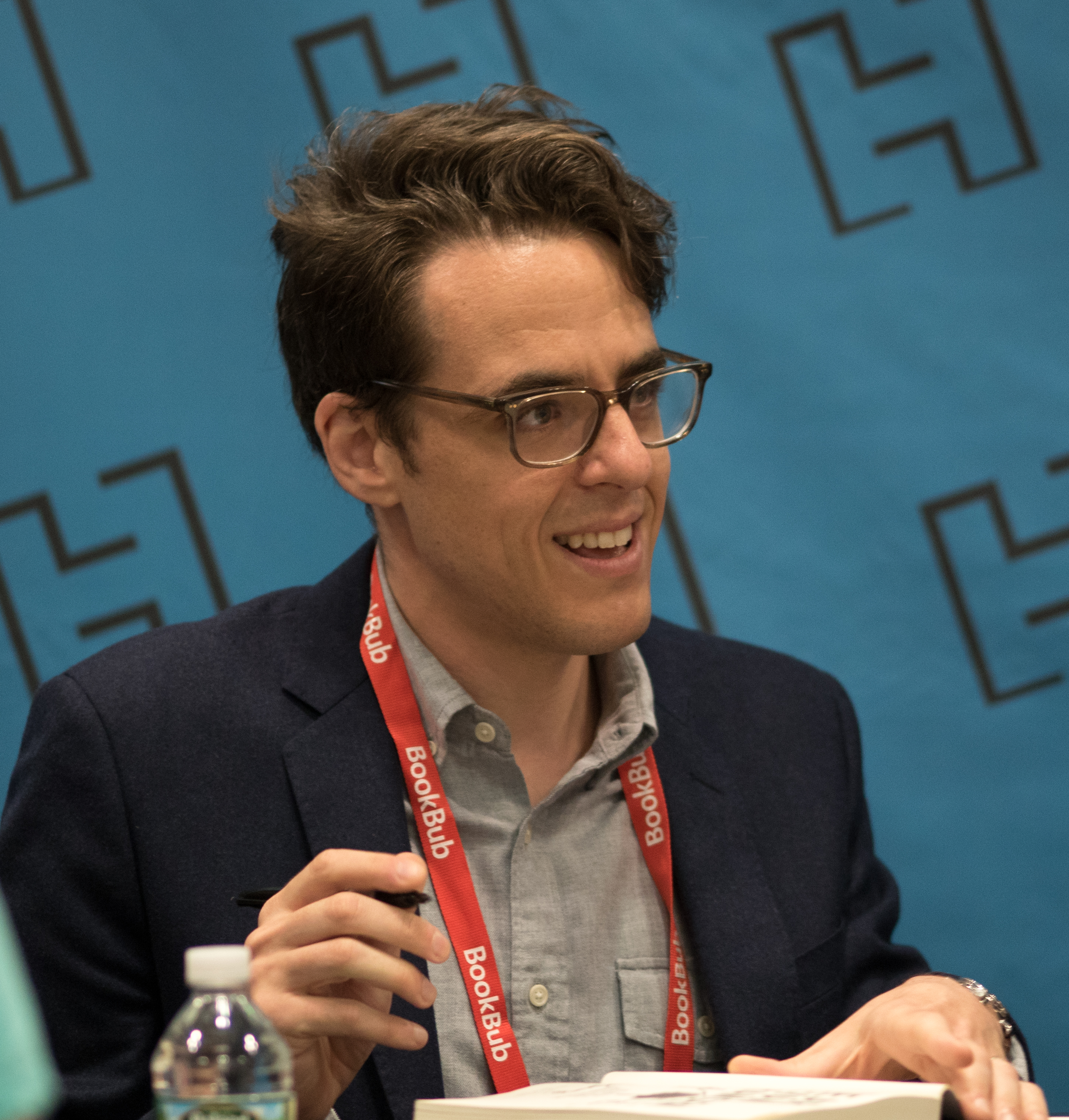
Lin-Manuel Miranda (left) directed the film, while Steven Levenson (right) penned the screenplay.

In order to adapt the musical for film, Miranda and Levenson conducted a significant amount of their own research. This included interviews with friends, family and colleagues such as Charleston, Roger Bart, Matt O'Grady (whom Michael is based on), and Ira Weitzman. Both Weitzman and Bart became characters in the film, played by Jonathan Marc Sherman and Joshua Henry respectively, as a direct result of these conversations. Larson's sister Julie, who was a producer on the film, discouraged Miranda and Levenson from sanitizing Larson's image, telling them to "get all the warts. Get all of that good stuff." Bart recalled that Larson could be "a pain in the ass" when his work was not being received the way he wanted, but he was generous to his collaborators once in the rehearsal room. This insight heavily influenced Larson's portrayal in the finished film.

Miranda and Levenson also accessed the Jonathan Larson Papers at the Library of Congress, in which the original scripts and demo tapes for Superbia, 30/90, Boho Days, and Tick, Tick... Boom! exist. Scenes from these scripts were used to create new scenes for the film: for example, a section where Larson recalled receiving feedback from a man named "Robert Rimer" at a musical theater workshop was adapted for the film, with "Rimer" replaced by the man's real name, Stephen Sondheim. In one early draft, Larson wrote that Susan's green dress was a commission made by a fashion designer/fellow waiter at the Moondance Diner named Carolyn: this led to the creation of the character Carolyn, played by Michaela Jaé Rodriguez, for the film.

The screenplay features a framing device loosely inspired by the Auburn script of Larson performing the monologue with two other performers, in this case Roger and Karessa, the former of whom is inspired by Roger Bart's role as background vocalist for performances of Boho Days and Tick, Tick... Boom!. As a result of this device, certain songs that are sung in the Auburn script by characters in the narrative are instead sung by Jonathan, Roger, and Karessa, interwoven with the drama onscreen. According to Levenson, Larson is telling the story to an audience, with most of the film taking place within his mind. "Come to Your Senses" is an example of a song that changed because of this device. In the 2001 production it was performed by the actress who plays both Susan and Karessa, while in the film it was turned into a duet between Karessa and Susan for dramatic purposes.

Two songs present in the 2001 Auburn script were cut during the writing process: "Sugar", which Jonathan and Karessa sing while bonding over their love of Twinkies, and "See Her Smile", a song sung by Jonathan about his relationship with Susan. However, Jonathan sings a riff of "Sugar" to Ira Weitzman at one point in the finished film. A third song, "Green Green Dress", was filmed but cut during post-production, and was later uploaded to Netflix's YouTube channel.

Miranda and Levenson also added three songs that were in previous versions of Tick, Tick... Boom! but not included in the Auburn script: "Boho Days", "Play Game", and "Swimming". In the latter's case, the song had been cut by Larson himself after the show's 1990 performances and had not been heard by the public in thirty years. "Boho Days" was the original opening number of Boho Days and was previously only available as a bonus track on the 2001 Off-Broadway cast recording, extracted from a demo tape recorded by Larson himself. Like Auburn had in 2001 by including "Come to Your Senses", Miranda and Levenson used the film as an opportunity to release more of the Superbia soundtrack, specifically a song titled "Sextet" as the lyrics "Everyone will be there" thematically fit with Larson's anxieties about the workshop.

=== Casting ===
Garfield was confirmed to star in October with Alexandra Shipp, Vanessa Hudgens, and Robin de Jesús joining in November 2019. Joshua Henry, Judith Light, and Bradley Whitford would join in January 2020.

Jordan Fisher, who had starred in Rent: Live, was meant to appear in the film as a character named "Simon" but due to the film's delays his wedding was scheduled on the same day his scene was to be shot, so he was replaced by Noah Robbins. However, the scene was ultimately cut from the film. Fisher's name had been listed on the film's casting announcements, and press reports continued to list both him and Robbins as members of the cast even after the film's release.

In preparation for his role as Sondheim, Whitford studied interviews with him from around the time the film takes place. He noted his performance is somewhat dialed back, as he described Sondheim as almost an "orangutan" in his physicality in interviews. To simplify his performance, he would think "Crooked smile on an unmade bed" before cameras started rolling, which he felt was the key element of physicality he needed.

=== Filming ===
Principal photography began as scheduled in March 2020. However, the production only filmed for eight days before the COVID-19 pandemic forced a shutdown, with the last day of filming taking place on March 12, 2020 outside of Larson's real apartment at 508 Greenwich Street. During the hiatus the cast, crew, and producers held weekly meetings on Zoom, which were colloquially referred to as "Tick, Tick... Zooms!". Production resumed in September 2020 under strict COVID protocols, and wrapped in November 2020. Location shoots included the Delacorte Theater in Central Park for "Why", the Underground Theater at the Abrons Arts Center (part of the Henry Street Settlement) for the musical theater workshop scene, Teatro LATEA at the Clemente Soto Velez Cultural and Educational Center for Susan's dance recital, and the dance studios at Hunter College for the Superbia workshop.

The singing in the finished film is a mix of actors lip-syncing to pre-recorded tracks, re-recording their vocals in post-production, and singing live on set, with the choice to use one or the others dependent on the environment and tone of the scene. In the case of "Why", Garfield felt the emotions in the pre-recorded playback track were insufficient, and so sang the song live during filming at the Delacorte Theater in March. This flexibility had to be limited after production resumed under COVID protocols, with the team limiting live singing to only certain moments. Miranda recalled one incident where Garfield spontaneously sang live on an impulse during one of the first days of shooting under the new protocols, leading Miranda to be scolded by the film's COVID Compliance Monitor. "Boho Days" was one of the few musical numbers filmed with live singing during this period: all of the actors in the scene had to quarantine for 14 days in order to film it.

The film includes a number of references, both visual and auditory, to Larson's later work Rent: besides Pascal, Rubin-Vega, and Heredia's cameos, Jonathan calls Michael "pookie" in several scenes, the Cat Scratch Club appears in the background of "Play Game", and Jonathan plays "One Song Glory" on his keyboard at one point. The team had hoped to include more locations associated with Rent, such as Tompkins Square Park and the Life Cafe in the East Village, but COVID restrictions resulted in most of these scenes being moved to the diner. The film's Superbia workshop montage consists of footage of the actors lip-syncing to a playlist compiled by Miranda, including songs from American Idiot and Hair: the last song on the playlist was "Seasons of Love".

During filming in late 2020, rumors leaked that Garfield was to make a return appearance as Spider-Man/Peter Parker in the then-unnamed upcoming Spider-Man film. Miranda approached Garfield on-set to ask if he was in it, to which a flustered Garfield gave an unconvincing denial. Miranda walked away from the conversation thinking Garfield would need to get better at lying: Garfield later became well known for his repeated denials that he was in Spider-Man: No Way Home during the press tour for Tick, Tick... Boom!.

==== Set and visual design ====
The film's production designers painstakingly recreated both the Moondance Diner and Larson's former apartment at 508 Greenwich Street. In the latter case, the team had access to footage of the apartment shot by Larson himself for insurance purposes, a mere two weeks before his death. This footage allowed them to identify the exact positions of objects, some of which were actually sourced to decorate the set. Original Rent stars Adam Pascal, Daphne Rubin-Vega, and Wilson Jermaine Heredia visited the apartment set while filming their cameos for "Sunday" at Miranda's invitation. They described it as a surreal experience, as all three had gathered at the real apartment during Rent's development. Heredia described the set as feeling "haunted", noting "...it wasn't [Jonathan Larson's] apartment; he was never in that place—but they spared no detail in order to make it look like his place."

The team also had access to eight years of Betamax footage shot by Larson's friend Victoria Leacock Hoffman, who was the daughter of a documentary filmmaker and filmed Larson's performances and his life. This footage was recreated in the film using an actual Betamax camera when attempts at recreating the look through visual effects did not work. The minor character Donna, played by Lauren Marcus, is based on Hoffman and is usually seen in the film following Jonathan around with a camera. The team was mindful of the role New York Theatre Workshop played in Larson's development as an artist, and initially planned to recreate the interior on a soundstage à la the Moondance Diner and 508 Greenwich, as the real theater was booked during the initial production period. However, because of the pandemic the theater was available when production restarted, allowing them to film on the same stage Jonathan Larson had performed Tick, Tick... Boom! 30 years earlier.

==== Musical sequences ====
In directing the film's musical sequences, Miranda borrowed heavily from his experience working with Jon M. Chu on the film adaptation of his musical In the Heights, namely balancing out a realistic approach versus allowing the musical sequences to exist in Jonathan's head. Ryan Heffington served as choreographer for the film's dance sequences. Cinematographer Alice Brooks highlighted "Sunday" and "Swimming" as two particularly challenging sequences, as the two exist in Larson's head more so than other songs in the film. The scenes were conceptualized between Miranda, Brooks, Levenson, the assistant director, the storyboard artist, and the production designer in a collaborative process akin to theater, based on making discoveries at each step. For "Swimming", Miranda came up with the idea for the "30" at the bottom of the swimming pool to turn into a treble clef, and thus the pool floor becoming sheet music, during a scouting visit to the pool with Brooks. The pool, which is located at the Tony Dapolito Recreation Center in the West Village, was chosen due to its resemblance to that described in the lyrics of "Swimming": it was only during filming that the designers and creative team learned this was the actual swimming pool Larson frequented. Although David Armstrong is credited as Andrew Garfield's swimming double, Garfield performed all of the swimming in the film himself: his father Richard Garfield is the head coach of the Guildford City Swimming Club and had trained him in the past. Miranda recalled that Armstrong turned to him after watching Garfield's swimming and declared, "I can't swim that fast." The elder Garfield was originally supposed to cameo as the man whom Jonathan tries to overtake in the pool, but he was unable to come to New York for the shoot due to the film's COVID delays.

Filming of the "Sunday" musical sequence (top) and the finished scene (below).

For "Sunday," which parodies the Act 1 finale of the same name from Sondheim's Sunday in the Park with George, the team set up the sequence as a deliberate contrast to the look of the rest of the film, as it is Larson's "wildest dream." This included the idea to turn the Moondance Diner into a proscenium stage by having the front come down, and overexposing the footage to resemble a painting, especially with the transition to a pointillist look at the very end of the song. The song had only ever been performed by Larson himself during his lifetime, so Miranda wanted to depict Larson's "dream choir" for the pivotal sequence. This included the actors who inspired him, particularly Peters for her role in Sunday in the Park with George, but also his future collaborators in Pascal, Rubin-Vega, and Heredia, as well as cast members from shows that Miranda considers "direct descendants" of Larson's work: Malone appears dressed as Big Alison from Fun Home, while Goldsberry and Soo wear the colors and strike the pose of the Schuyler sisters from Miranda's own Hamilton. Miranda also recruited Michael Starobin, who orchestrated Sunday in the Park with George, to achieve the sound of the Sondheim parody. The scene was shot under heavy COVID protocols, particularly for some of the older actors. Miranda's cameo in the scene was written for Chip Zien and Joanna Gleason, who starred in the original Broadway cast of Sondheim's Into the Woods, but COVID restrictions prevented them from appearing.

=== Post-production ===
Andrew Weisblum served as the initial editor of the film up to the first development screening. Due to the film's COVID delays, he had to leave to work on Darren Aronofsky's The Whale and was replaced by Myron Kerstein. Miranda's original assembly cut ran 2 hours and 20 minutes, whereas he preferred the film to run less than two hours.

The film originally opened with a sequence focusing on Jonathan pacing anxiously backstage before the Tick, Tick... Boom! performance. This was mostly cut because it was decided the opening of the film needed to be about who Larson was, rather than the character Jonathan's anxieties. Footage from this deleted opening is present in the film's initial teaser trailer. The first scene at the diner during "30/90" was originally a different scene with Michael and Jonathan packing up Michael's things at their apartment. During preparation for reshoots, Kerstein pitched the scene at the diner so the sequence could introduce the characters of Freddy and Carolyn, minimizing time needed later in the film: he was alarmed when Levenson and Miranda shot a four-page scene in response, though he was relieved to learn they were open to cutting dialogue if needed.

A question that arose during post-production was how to address the real Jonathan Larson's death. David Auburn had intentionally avoided doing so for the 2001 production, feeling that such a move would cheapen the effect of the story onstage. He had even gone so far as to remove lines Larson wrote about feeling like his heart would explode, as he felt it would serve to distract audience members whom he assumed knew the circumstances of Larson's death. However, Miranda, Weisblum, and Kerstein realized that, with the passage of time, there were more audience members unfamiliar with Larson who would need to get on the same page as the filmmakers about his "ticking clock". Likewise, they would need the context of not just Larson's death, but his legacy through his most well-known show, Rent. Miranda did not want this information conveyed through onscreen text at the end, despite Kerstein joking this is traditional with even critically-acclaimed biopics. Miranda argued such a method was too obvious, and that the information needed to be incorporated into the film in a natural way. The team eventually settled on documentary-style bookends that combine narration, archival footage, and recreated Betamax footage, which Kerstein described as bringing the film "full circle" and thus allowing the information to be an effective part of the film's storytelling.

Sondheim's vocal cameo (a concept that carries over from productions of the original musical) came about when he asked to rewrite his voicemail message after viewing the film, as he felt he would not say what had originally been written. However, at this point in production Whitford was not available to re-record the line, so Sondheim offered to record it himself.

==== "Green Green Dress" ====
One of the film's more controversial cuts was the removal of the "Green Green Dress" musical number. In the stage version, the song is a duet between Jonathan and Susan singing about their love for one another by way of the green dress that Susan wears, whereas in the film it plays as an R&B cover performed by Joshua Henry over a scene of the two making love. The song was filmed as a fully choreographed number, but Miranda found that it slowed the pace of the film. Though reluctant to cut it, he felt it was necessary to remove it as it was the only song where no story occurs. Miranda did not want to completely lose the song, hence the presence of the cover, and Garfield and Shipp's version was included in the end credits and on the soundtrack. Following fan demand, the deleted scene was released on social media on March 17, 2022 to celebrate Saint Patrick's Day.

Margaret Hall, writing for TheaterMania, observed that most of the songs in the film are presented as diegetic music, a part of the world of the film, whereas "Green Green Dress" is one of the few numbers that is non-diegetic, where the characters do not necessarily know they are singing. While the final cut does include non-diegetic numbers such as "No More" and "Swimming", unlike those songs "Green Green Dress" does not offer new information about the characters singing it, nor does it offer much more insight into Jonathan and Susan's relationship than what is already presented. One of the film's major plot elements is that Jonathan is so focused on his career he is unable to stay on the same page as Susan, which is achieved by Susan not getting a solo for the majority of the film: one of her duets with Jonathan, "Therapy", instead becomes a diegetic performance by Jonathan and Karessa that contrasts with the couple's real-life argument. Removing "Green Green Dress" serves to finalize this disconnect, with Susan never singing a solo on a song until "Come to Your Senses", and in this case it is purely in Jonathan's head. Hall concluded that removing "Green Green Dress" was an example of one of the many changes to Tick, Tick... Boom! that showed the production team's ability to engage with film as a medium rather than produce a straightforward stage-to-screen adaptation.

=== Historical accuracy ===
The original Tick, Tick... Boom! rock monologue is a semi-autobiographical work: it derives from Larson's life but the events described are partially fictionalized. While the film affirms the "Jon" character as Jonathan Larson (only loosely confirmed in the original musical) and includes significant additional research done by Levenson and Miranda, the script alludes to the fact that there are parts of the story that "Jonathan made up."

- Stephen Sondheim was actually Larson's mentor for some time prior to the Superbia presentation: their correspondence began when Larson sent Sondheim a letter in college and Sondheim responded. Sondheim had even invited Larson to observe rehearsals for the original Broadway production of Into the Woods in 1987.
- Matt O'Grady, the inspiration for Michael, was never actually Larson's roommate and was never involved in the performing arts even as they were growing up.
- The musical theater workshop scenes are based on Larson's presentations of material from Superbia from 1985 to 1986: at the ASCAP Foundation Musical Theatre Workshop in November and December 1985 and at the Dramatists Guild in April 1986. Sondheim was a panelist for the ASCAP Workshop alongside Peter Stone, Tony Tanner, Nancy Ford, and Charles Strouse. The panel at the Dramatists Guild performance included Sondheim, Stone, John Kander, Martin Charnin, and Stephen Schwartz, who cameos as an aspiring composer in the scene from the film based on these panels. According to the 2018 oral history Boho Days: The Wider Works of Jonathan Larson, Sondheim was one of the few panelists across the presentations who consistently praised Superbia. Walter Bloom, played by Richard Kind, appears to be the film's stand-in for the negative feedback Larson received during this period.
- The Superbia Playwrights Horizons workshop, produced by Ira Weitzman and directed by R. J. Cutler, actually took place on December 19, 1988. Larson's disappointment in the workshop went beyond a lack of offers for production: rather than the rock band or even the synthesizer he wanted, the workshop only had standard piano accompaniment, and the musical theater-trained cast had difficulty with the energy of Larson's rock score. Though Sondheim did come to support his pupil, he left after the first act.
- The film implies Larson stopped developing Superbia after the failed Playwrights Horizons presentation. He actually continued work on it for some years afterwards, including a screenplay adaptation in 1990 and a reading at The Public Theater in 1991. He had ceased further development on it by the 1992 NYTW staging of Tick, Tick... Boom! due to focusing on Rent.
- Janet Charleston, the inspiration for Susan, did not fully break up with Larson: rather, the character's actions and motivations over the course of the original monologue's development were based on changes in the pair's on-again, off-again relationship. In fact, the two were still together at the time of Larson's death.
- Although the film depicts Larson grappling with writing the Superbia song "Come to Your Senses," in reality, it was one of the earliest songs composed for the show and underwent few revisions. It was dropped from the show in 1987, a year before Superbia was staged at Playwrights Horizons. The songs Larson most notably struggled with were "LCD Readout" and "Too Cold to Care" (originally titled "One of These Days"). Of the two, "LCD Readout" most closely fits the description of a song he was still rewriting prior to the workshop. This creative struggle is also reflected in Larson’s original performance of "Why," where rather than "Come to Your Senses," which was added to Tick, Tick... Boom! posthumously, fragments of both "LCD Readout" and "Too Cold to Care" can be heard.

=== Music ===
The Tick, Tick... Boom! soundtrack was released for streaming/digital on November 12, 2021, by Masterworks Broadway on the same day as the film's theatrical release. A physical CD was released on December 3, 2021. All Jonathan Larson songs in the film were produced by Alex Lacamoire, Bill Sherman, and Kurt Crowley (who cameos in the film as the rehearsal pianist for Superbia, Francis). The songs were mixed by Greg Wells, and music supervised by Steven Gizicki. "30/90" was released via streaming on October 5, 2021. "Louder Than Words" was also released as a single along with the album's pre-order date on October 22, 2021.

Levenson and Miranda felt it was important for the film to play with the credit "score by Jonathan Larson" and so sourced many songs from the Library of Congress archives, including several that had never received an official release. This includes three songs from Superbia not included in the soundtrack: "Ever After" (used to underscore the focus group meeting), "LCD Readout", and "Sextet". Kurt Crowley released a solo arrangement of the latter featuring Joshua Henry during the COVID-induced break in the film's production. After considerable fan demand, the newly titled "Sextet Montage" was released as a single on February 4, 2022 in honor of what would have been Larson's 62nd birthday.

A song called "Debtor Club" underscores the scene of Jonathan inviting various industry professionals to his reading. This was a song originally written for Boho Days, described as a "Tears-for-Fears-esque track" which was replaced with "No More". The film also includes three stand-alone songs by Larson: "Rhapsody", which plays in the background of Susan's dance recital and over the film's credits; "Out of My Dreams" covered by Veronica Vazquez, which can be heard when Jonathan meets Susan on the roof; and "It Only Takes a Few", covered by The Mountain Goats, which plays over the credits. Of these, only "Out of My Dreams" and "It Only Takes a Few" were released on the film's soundtrack. Additionally, a rejected CNN jingle that Larson wrote plays in the background of Jonathan and Michael's car ride. The cut song "Sugar" is referenced when Jonathan sings a riff from it to Ira Weitzman.

As an easter egg, Jonathan plays the opening melody of "One Song Glory" from Rent at one point in the film.

== Release and reception ==
On June 10, 2021, the first trailer for the film was released online, confirming that the film would be released on Netflix and in select theaters in late 2021. It had its Los Angeles premiere at AFI Fest on November 10, 2021, as the festival's opening night film, and its NY premiere at the Schoenfeld Theater. It was released in a limited release on November 12, 2021, prior to its streaming release on Netflix on November 19, 2021.

=== Critical response ===
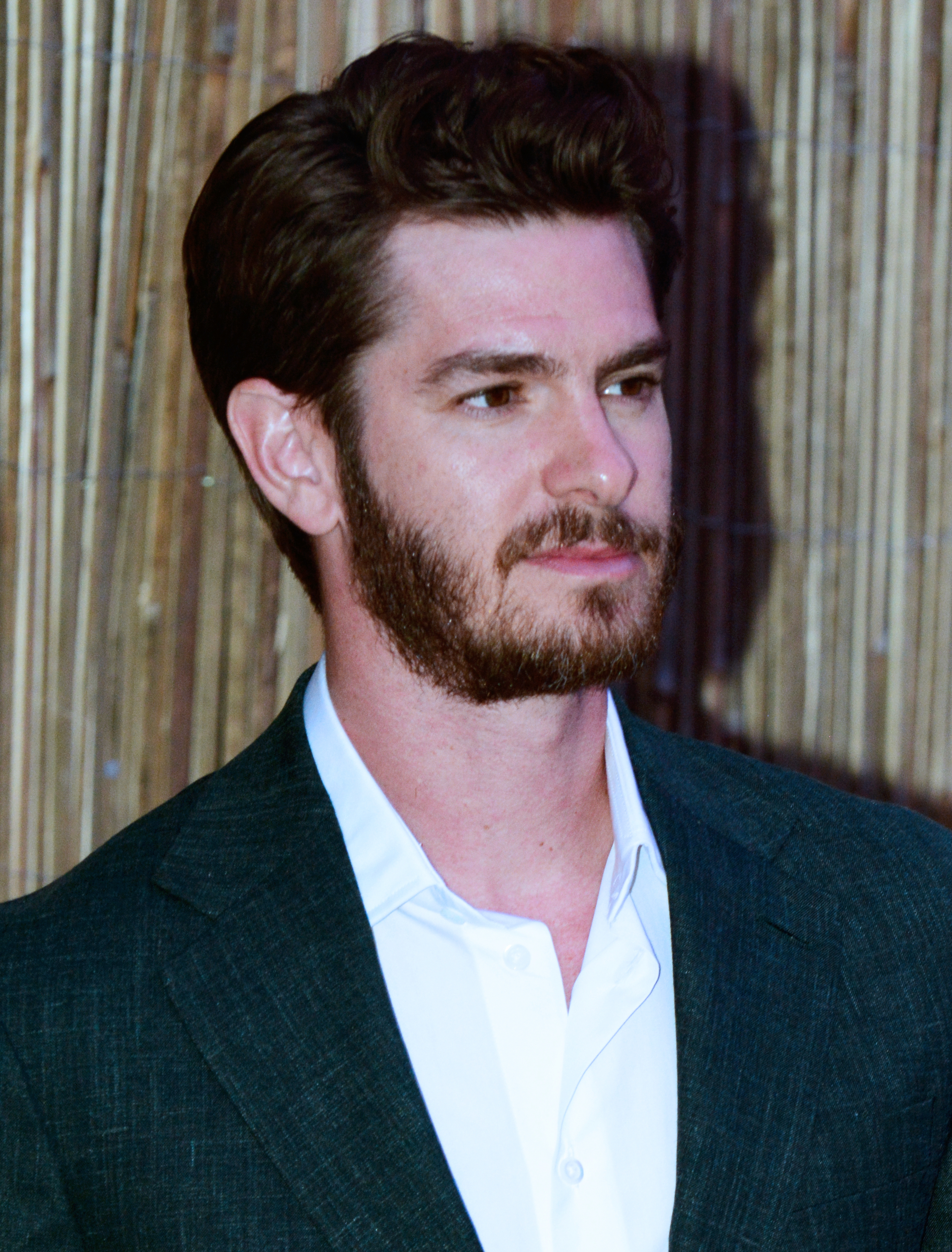
Andrew Garfield received critical acclaim for his performance and was nominated for the Academy Award for Best Actor, in addition to winning the Golden Globe.

On the review aggregator website Rotten Tomatoes, 87% of 221 critics' reviews are positive. The website's consensus reads: "tick, tick... BOOM! makes musical magic out of a story focused on the creative process -- an impressive feat for debuting director Lin-Manuel Miranda." Metacritic, which uses a weighted average, assigned the film a score of 74 out of 100, based on 44 critics, indicating "generally favorable" reviews.

The film was universally praised for its adaptation of the original musical, with Vulture's Jackson McHenry highlighting the expanded cast and depiction of the world of the show. Garfield and de Jesús's performances were particularly praised, due to Garfield's surprising musical ability and de Jesús's starring turn in a film after largely working in theater. Jessica Derschowitz of Entertainment Weekly dubbed the film a "totem for the thrills and trials of making art, with all the sacrifices and empathy it requires", also praising it as a tribute to Larson. Miranda's directing debut was also praised, particularly due to the challenge of adapting the material. Variety's Peter Debruge noted that despite Miranda's own personal connection to Larson's story, his direction seemed devoid of ego and purely focused on centering Larson.

The film's choice to contextualize Larson's career and legacy through the documentary-style bookends was criticized even by positive reviewers. McHenry noted it reduced Larson to his most successful work and the film was stronger when the character was telling his story. McHenry also noted that like Rent, Tick, Tick... Boom! views the AIDS crisis from the perspective of a straight male who did not contract the disease, and though the film adaptation expands its view on the crisis, the gesture feels incomplete.

Filmmaker Rob Marshall, who worked with Miranda on the Disney films Mary Poppins Returns (2018) and The Little Mermaid (2023), praised the film, calling it an "astonishing directorial debut" and saying that he was "struck by how authentic, original and deeply personal the film is. Clearly Lin connects intensely with the urgency, frustration, passion, struggle and heartbreak of Jonathan Larson’s creative process. You feel it in every frame."

In 2023, it ranked number 38 on Time Out's list of "The 40 Best Musical Movies of All Time," writing that while not for everyone, the film is "an ideal entry point for sceptics." It also ranked number 15 on Screen Rant's list of "The 35 Best Musicals of All Time." Parade ranked it at number 36 on its list of the "67 Best Movie Musicals of All Time," calling it the "most invigorating snapshot of the all-consuming struggle of a creative since Brad Bird's layered masterpiece Ratatouille."

=== Audience response ===
Julia Delbel, writing for ComingSoon.net, observed that in a year of musical movie releases that saw films such as In the Heights, Dear Evan Hansen, and West Side Story, Tick, Tick... Boom! stood out for generating considerable buzz, whereas the other films struggled at the box office. She suggested the continued effect of the pandemic on movie theater attendance was to blame, noting the popularity of Miranda's Encanto following its release on Disney+ after underperforming at the box office, with Tick, Tick... Boom!'s status as a streaming release making it more easily accessible to its audience. Between its release and June 2023, the film totaled 1.4 million hours watched.

=== Accolades ===
Award	Date of ceremony	Category	Recipient(s)	Result	Ref.
Detroit Film Critics Society Awards	December 6, 2021	Best Director	Lin-Manuel Miranda	Won	
Detroit Film Critics Society Awards	December 6, 2021	Best Actor	Andrew Garfield	Nominated	
Detroit Film Critics Society Awards	December 6, 2021	Best Adapted Screenplay	Steven Levenson	Nominated	
Detroit Film Critics Society Awards	December 6, 2021	Best Use of Music	Tick, Tick... Boom!	Nominated	
Washington D.C. Area Film Critics Association Awards	December 6, 2021	Best Film	Tick, Tick... Boom!	Nominated	
Washington D.C. Area Film Critics Association Awards	December 6, 2021	Best Actor	Andrew Garfield	Won	
Washington D.C. Area Film Critics Association Awards	December 6, 2021	Best Adapted Screenplay	Steven Levenson	Nominated	
Washington D.C. Area Film Critics Association Awards	December 6, 2021	Best Editing	Myron Kerstein and Andrew Weisblum	Won	
Palm Springs International Film Festival	January 6, 2022	Desert Palm Award	Andrew Garfield	Won	
Golden Globe Awards	January 9, 2022	Best Motion Picture – Musical or Comedy	Tick, Tick... Boom!	Nominated	
Golden Globe Awards	January 9, 2022	Best Actor – Motion Picture Musical or Comedy	Andrew Garfield	Won	
AACTA Awards	January 26, 2022	Best Lead Actor – International	Andrew Garfield	Nominated	
Screen Actors Guild Awards	February 27, 2022	Outstanding Performance by a Male Actor in a Leading Role	Andrew Garfield	Nominated	
Hollywood Critics Association Awards	February 28, 2022	Best Picture	Tick, Tick... Boom!	Nominated	
Hollywood Critics Association Awards	February 28, 2022	Best Director	Lin-Manuel Miranda	Nominated	
Hollywood Critics Association Awards	February 28, 2022	Best Actor	Andrew Garfield	Won	
Hollywood Critics Association Awards	February 28, 2022	Best Supporting Actor	Robin de Jesús	Nominated	
Hollywood Critics Association Awards	February 28, 2022	Best Adapted Screenplay	Steven Levenson	Nominated	
Hollywood Critics Association Awards	February 28, 2022	Best Film Editing	Myron Kerstein and Andrew Weisblum	Nominated	
Hollywood Critics Association Awards	February 28, 2022	Best First Feature	Lin-Manuel Miranda	Won	
Hollywood Critics Association Awards	February 28, 2022	Best Comedy or Musical	Tick, Tick... Boom!	Won	
ACE Eddie Awards	March 5, 2022	Best Edited Feature Film – Comedy	Myron Kerstein and Andrew Weisblum	Won	
American Film Institute Awards	March 11, 2022	Top 10 Movies of the Year	Tick, Tick...Boom!	Won	
Directors Guild of America Awards	March 12, 2022	Outstanding Directing – First-Time Feature Film	Lin-Manuel Miranda	Nominated	
Critics' Choice Movie Awards	March 13, 2022	Best Picture	Tick, Tick... Boom!	Nominated	
Critics' Choice Movie Awards	March 13, 2022	Best Actor	Andrew Garfield	Nominated	
Producers Guild of America Awards	March 19, 2022	Best Theatrical Motion Picture	Julie Oh and Lin-Manuel Miranda	Nominated	
Writers Guild of America Awards	March 20, 2022	Best Adapted Screenplay	Steven Levenson	Nominated	
Casting Society of America	March 23, 2022	Feature Big Budget – Drama	Bernard Telsey and Kristian Charbonier	Nominated	
Academy Awards	March 27, 2022	Best Actor	Andrew Garfield	Nominated	
Academy Awards	March 27, 2022	Best Film Editing	Myron Kerstein and Andrew Weisblum	Nominated	
Satellite Awards	April 2, 2022	Best Motion Picture – Comedy or Musical	Tick, Tick... Boom!	Won	
Satellite Awards	April 2, 2022	Best Director	Lin-Manuel Miranda	Nominated	
Satellite Awards	April 2, 2022	Best Actor in a Motion Picture – Comedy or Musical	Andrew Garfield	Won	
Satellite Awards	April 2, 2022	Best Supporting Actor	Robin de Jesús	Nominated	
Satellite Awards	April 2, 2022	Best Cinematography	Alice Brooks	Nominated	
Satellite Awards	April 2, 2022	Best Editing	Myron Kerstein and Andrew Weisblum	Nominated	
Satellite Awards	April 2, 2022	Best Sound	Paul Hsu and Tod A. Maitland	Won	
GLAAD Media Awards	April 2/May 6, 2022	Outstanding Film – Wide Release	Tick, Tick... Boom!	Nominated	
MTV Movie & TV Awards	June 5, 2022	Best Musical Moment	Andrew Garfield and Vanessa Hudgens for "Therapy"	Nominated	
