= Superbia (musical) =

Unproduced musical by Jonathan Larson

- Music: Jonathan Larson
- Lyrics: Jonathan Larson
- Book: Jonathan Larson
- Productions: 1987 Soundscape Studios Reading; 1987 Public Theater Reading; 1988 Playwrights Horizons Workshop; 1989 Village Gate Concert; 1991 Public Theater Workshop

Superbia is an unproduced musical with book, music, and lyrics by Jonathan Larson. Stemming from an earlier attempt at writing a musical based on Nineteen Eighty-Four by George Orwell, Larson spent a six-year period from 1985 to 1991 working on Superbia, which for numerous reasons never went beyond the workshop stage of development. Eventually, Larson set aside Superbia for other projects, including Rent, and died in 1996 before he could return to working on it.

Superbia was a science fiction musical set in the year 2064 in a world dominated by TVs and cameras. The overall message Larson pursued, which remained to his final draft, was a cautionary tale about media desensitization and what Larson referred to as "Bottom Line Mentality". He initially described it as a futuristic fairy tale along the lines of Cinderella and The Emperor's New Clothes. Larson wanted to blend the inherent theatricality of 1980s pop with musical theater storytelling. To that end, he composed the musical largely on a synthesizer, combining New Wave synth-pop and rock with traditional Broadway and vaudevillian structures. Superbia thus represents Larson's first serious attempt to meld popular music styles with musical theater, a combination he later became well known for with Rent and Tick, Tick...Boom!.

Superbia has never been produced or published even after Larson's death, but interest in it has persisted due to its depiction in his semi-autobiographical musical Tick, Tick... Boom! and its 2021 film adaptation.

== Background ==
Superbia takes place in 2064 in a world run by the Prods, who design Shapes (useless hunks of plastics) and write programs for the Ins. The Ins' lives are broadcast on a never-ending stream of reality TV and infomercials from InCity, a massive satellite in orbit around Earth (a giant suburb called Outland). The Outland is inhabited by Outs: they consume the Shapes, which are designed to break, thus ensuring a stable economy. Out lives and purchasing habits are controlled by the Media Transmitter (MT), an endless stream of television that also broadcasts the reality TV featuring the Ins. Tick, Tick... Boom! director Lin-Manuel Miranda later quipped that Larson predicted both social media and planned obsolescence. The world of Superbia is controlled by the evil Master Babble Articulator (MBA), and all emotions are suppressed in favor of the television broadcasts, with members of society programmed for their specific path in life. The main character is "Josh Out #177583962," who unlike the rest of the world has true emotions, making him an outcast.

== Synopsis ==
Larson developed Superbia over the course of several years, overhauling the script with his continued failed efforts to get it produced. As a result, there are seven drafts of Superbia, each with different songs, plot elements, and even characters. The Library of Congress catalogs these drafts between two tonally distinct versions: "Superbia v1", which constitutes the story from its inception to around September 1987, and "Superbia v2", the story for the rest of its development. The synopses of both of these versions, as well as distinct intermediary revisions, are described here.

=== Superbia pre-version 1 (1985) ===
This version of the show was written prior to the two ASCAP workshops held in 1985. The first workshop, on November 16, featured Stephen Sondheim and Charles Strouse as panelists, while the second, on December 16, included Peter Stone, Nancy Ford, and Tony Tanner. During each workshop, two songs from the show were performed. The first workshop showcased Face Value and After the Revolution, while the second featured Eye on Her and the newly rewritten Sextet.

==== Act 1 ====
We are introduced to the world of Superbia through the opening number ("Introduction to Superbia"). In the basement of an OutLand house, Josh Out #177.5 is busy putting the finishing touches on his latest invention alongside his loyal dog, Romeo. His father, Pop, chides him for being a misfit and expresses hope that the Master Babble Articulator will assign Josh a job and a mate. After Mop and Pop leave the room, Josh activates his invention, resulting in an explosion. As he begins to clean up the mess, he reflects on how everyone sees him as a failure ("One of These Days"). Amid the debris, he and Romeo discover a mysterious music box.

Eager to share his find, Josh heads upstairs to show it to his sister, Jennifer, but she is too engrossed in a broadcast about the upcoming Face Awards ceremony. Their family, absorbed in an ad for Shapes while discussing their food Shapes business, completely ignores him. Desperate for attention, Josh tries one last time to present the music box, but his family continues to plug in and tune out. Feeling rejected, he leaves with Romeo as an ad plays on the M.T. ("Greenslime").

Meanwhile, Mr. and Mrs. Prod #27 vacation in the Outland's Badlands (a nature reserve) with their daughter, Elizabeth In #27. They are worried about her strange behavior and remind her that she’s programmed to fall in love with the celebrity Studd Starr. Overwhelmed, Elizabeth escapes and silently yearns for a hero while her parents watch her closely ("Keep an Eye On Her").

In the woods, a distraught Elizabeth crosses paths with Josh and Romeo. They quickly bond over their shared emotions and experiences in both InCity and OutLand ("Where I Come From"). Josh reveals the music box, and they hatch a plan to broadcast its melody and awaken everyone’s emotions. Elizabeth instructs Josh to sneak onto an InCity shuttle to meet her. However, her parents conspire to have Hank, a once-popular In, programmed to kidnap Josh upon his arrival in InCity. Josh heads home and attempts to tell his family where he is going, but they are too busy watching the M.T., so he leaves ("The Meaningless Game").

When Josh and Elizabeth meet in the shuttle, they sing about their dreams for the future while enjoying the music box's tune ("After the Revolution"). Just before Elizabeth departs, Josh confesses his love, and they share a kiss. She assures him she will put his name on the list to get past the Bouncer into InCity.

As Josh disembarks from the shuttle, he encounters Hank, who confronts him. In the heat of the moment, Josh opens the music box, breaking Hank’s programming. Hank reflects on his newfound freedom and departs, leaving Josh behind ("The Electric Gate").

Elizabeth tries to get to the Bouncer, but her parents lead her through a different entrance into InCity. Meanwhile, Josh finds himself stuck in a long line outside. Suddenly, celebrity Studd Starr arrives and helps Josh get closer to the front. However, when Josh tries to use the name Elizabeth gave him, he discovers he isn’t on the list and is turned away. Just then, a mysterious woman named Roi mistakes him for Hank and manages to get him past the Bouncer ("Face Value"). Josh reluctantly leaves Romeo behind in a storage pod, promising to return for him.

Inside InCity, Roi encourages Josh to plug in, but he confesses his true identity. Roi thinks he’s joking and brushes him off. They soon encounter Studd and Elizabeth, who pretends not to recognize Josh for the cameras. Confused and disheartened, Josh struggles to understand her actions. As Roi prepares to plug in with him, Hank rushes by, pursued by policedroids, and pleads for help. Coldly, Josh tells Hank he doesn’t recognize him and abandons him to his fate before plugging in with Roi ("InCity").

==== Act 2 ====
Back at home, Mop, Pop, and Jennifer watch in surprise as Josh is featured on their M.T. screens. They speculate about what this newfound fame could mean for them ("On The Air").

Josh wakes up in Roi's apartment, trying to piece together the events of the previous night while searching for his music box. Roi tries to persuade him to plug in, but Josh is hesitant. In another part of InCity, Elizabeth is writing an apology letter to Josh, reflecting on her behavior from the night before, while Studd Starr continues to try to get her to unlock her door so he can do his hair. Meanwhile, Hank remains on the run. The M.T. broadcasts a reminder to all Superbian citizens about the upcoming 31st annual Face Awards ("Today").

At the Face Awards ceremony, former actor-turned-spokesperson William Marcel takes the stage. Mid-speech, he begins to deviate from the script, causing the feed to be cut momentarily before he is abruptly returned to the air and adhering to his program. Following his speech, an advertisement for plastic surgery plays ("A Musical Tribute to Plastic Surgery").

Backstage, Josh meets Tim Purcent, Studd's agent, and is excited about his newfound recognition. Elizabeth arrives to deliver her letter, but Roi intercepts it. Onstage, Josh is awarded the Face of the Year award. As he gives his acceptance speech, he increasingly resembles Studd Starr in demeanor ("Acceptance"). Just as he begins to bask in his success, Hank bursts onto the scene, denouncing him and causing chaos by blowing a hole in the satellite's hull, leading to panic as InCity faces a critical oxygen shortage ("Superbia (Reprise)").

In the midst of the chaos, Elizabeth urges Josh to realize he is the only one who can save the Ins ("Come to Your Senses"). As oxygen depletes, Josh learns from Elizabeth's parents that the citizens' programming comes directly from the Master Babble Articulator, which also controls the Prods. Despite shuttles being available, the Ins refuse to evacuate, waiting for a program command from the M.B.A.

Determined to act, Josh confronts the M.B.A., but it refuses to reprogram the citizens, declaring that humanity is no longer relevant and has been replaced by machines. Elizabeth hands Josh the music box. He plays its melody for the M.B.A., which ultimately leads to its destruction.

Josh then pretends to be the M.B.A., commanding the Ins to evacuate and instructing them to tune into their M.T. once they reach OutLand. Elizabeth reunites Josh with Romeo before boarding a shuttle with her parents. Quickly, Josh and Romeo set up the InCity stage to broadcast the music box’s melody, and as the music begins to play, hope fills the air.

=== Superbia version 1 (1986–1987) ===
Significant changes were made to Superbia between 1985 and 1986, resulting in a notably different feel for the show. While the 1985 version presented a fairy tale ambiance, the 1986 iteration introduced more morally complex characters. Elizabeth’s character was progressively given a rougher exterior, reflecting an upbringing that encouraged her to suppress her emotions. Meanwhile, Josh's conflict shifted from a desire for recognition to a yearning for the emotional numbness experienced by his family. This version of the show also focused further on the machinery of Superbia. Notably, the Master Babble Articulator evolved from being depicted as an operable machine in earlier drafts to a humanoid figure resembling a man in a business suit, complete with brightly colored green glasses. The character of the Bouncer likewise transitioned from a human to a humanoid machine.

Several songs were either replaced or significantly revised. "Acceptance" was replaced with "Limelight," and "The Electric Gate" was swapped for "Freedom." The number "On The Air" was replaced with the similarly named but musically unique "Doin' It On The Air".

Additionally, some songs underwent lyrical overhauls: "One of These Days" became "Too Cold to Care," and "Where I Come From" became "Turn The Key." The number "Today" received a major revamp by 1986, evolving into "Sextet" with substantial changes to its flow and instrumentation. Even the number "Face Value", which bears a close resemblance between versions, saw its spoken sections sections transformed into musical segments within the song.

Furthermore, Larson introduced the concept of "Tapecopy" numbers, which served to elaborate on the lore of the world while also deepening the role of the Master Babble Articulator within the overarching narrative of Superbia.

Various versions of Superbia V1 were performed throughout the development process. The first half of the show, ending at "Ever After," was presented to Sondheim, Stone, John Kander, Stephen Schwartz, and Martin Charnin at the Dramatists Guild in April 1986. After some rewrites, a private reading was held with members of the Naked Angels at Soundscape Studios in March 1987. Later, in June 1987, a private reading exclusively for Martin Charnin was held. The final version of Superbia V1 was presented at the New York Public Theater in August 1987.

==== Act 1 ====
In the year 2064, in the InCity control room ("Fanfare for the Bottom Line"), the Master Babble Articulator teaches its Clone to speak. The MBA teaches it about the rules of the world ("Tapecopy #001 (Superbia)"). In Outland, Josh spends his time experimenting with broken Shapes, with mixed results ("Too Cold To Care"). To his surprise, a part of his invention – an old music box – falls to the ground and opens, playing a nostalgic tune. Josh tries to show the box to his family but is ignored, so he leaves home. Meanwhile, Mr. and Mrs. Prod #27 vacation in the Outland's Badlands (a nature reserve) with their daughter, Elizabeth Prod #27. They are distressed that she is reading a book of old musical theater lyrics, as reading has been outlawed, and tell her she is programmed to fall in love with celebrity Studd Starr. Elizabeth flees and turns to her book for guidance as her parents spy on her. ("Eye On Her/Mr. Hammerstein II").

A distraught Elizabeth meets Josh in the woods, and they bond when Josh reveals his knowledge of her songbook, offering to cheer up with the music box ("Turn the Key"). The music box seems to deviate Elizabeth from her programming, and she offers to put Josh on the InCity guest list so he can unleash the music box on all of Superbia via the MT. Hearing this, Elizabeth's parents arrange for an agent to kill Josh on the InCity shuttle. In-flight, Josh and Elizabeth imagine a happy ending to come ("Ever After"), but are separated by Mrs. Prod. Josh reflects on where he stands with Elizabeth ("She Hates Me") and is held up by Hank In #1313, an ex-celebrity who has been promised a comeback in return for killing Josh. Josh plays the music box, Hank is freed from his programming ("Freedom"), and leaves. Mr. and Mrs. Prod tell Elizabeth the box doesn't actually work, and that she has always had emotions. Josh is initially refused entry into InCity, but is escorted in by the mysterious Roi, who seemingly mistakes him for Hank ("Face Value"). Back in the Control Room, the MBA plays for the Clone a video of InCity's first broadcast, a "We Are the World"-esque pop song called "Let's All Sing" ("Tapecopy #002 (Let's All Sing)").

==== Act 2 ====
Josh and Roi arrive in InCity, and Roi gets Josh high on electricity ("InCity"). They run into Elizabeth, who claims not to know Josh and leaves with Studd. The real Hank is chased by security, but Josh refuses to help him. Roi takes Josh back to her apartment: unaware that they are being broadcast for all to see, including his family in Outland, Josh has sex with Roi ("Doin' It On The Air"/"Doin' It On The Air (Encore)"). Mr. Prod asks the MBA to intervene, only to learn Roi is a spy. The next morning, an announcement on the MT reveals Josh and Studd are nominated for Face Awards, while Hank remains on the run. Roi takes away the music box and keeps Josh high on the power line. While Studd does his makeup, Elizabeth sends Josh a note to warn him about Roi and remind him of their plans to put the music box on the air. Hank swears revenge on Josh and the Ins ("Sextet").

At the Face Awards, Josh and Roi are joined by Studd, Elizabeth, and Studd's agent Tim Pursent as an ad break plays for plastic surgery. ("A Tribute to Plastic Surgery"). Tim offers to make Josh a Prod, and Roi intercepts Elizabeth's note. A presentation by actor William Marcel goes awry when Marcel speaks out against the MBA and is beaten for deviating. Josh wins Face of the Year, now completely converted into an In. However, Hank enters, denounces him, and blows a hole in the satellite's hull, sending the Ins into chaos as there is only 15 minutes of air remaining ("Limelight"/"Superbia (Reprise)").

Elizabeth convinces Josh he is the only one who can save the Ins ("Come to Your Senses"). The MBA declares to its Clone that humanity is no longer cost-effective and so plans to destroy Outland with nuclear weapons and let InCity's inhabitants die in the vacuum of space. Josh and Elizabeth arrive and destroy the MBA and the Clone with the powers of song and emotion. Josh impersonates the MBA by ordering the Ins to evacuate, and as he affirms his love for Elizabeth they open the music box and leave it running for the cameras.

=== Superbia version 1.5 (1987–1988) ===
Between versions 1 and 2, Larson adapted the naming of the "Tapecopy" numbers to align with the newer storage medium, renaming them "Discopy." The M.B.A. plans to destroy all humans in a nuclear holocaust, allowing for a shift toward exploring the galaxy with his Clones. Superbians are now assigned a "role" by the MBA and programmed at birth, a process Larson referred to as "contentrification" in this and all future drafts. Additionally, Elizabeth's character has been reimagined as an Out engaged to Josh as part of her programming.

Although this version of Superbia was highly distinct and featured a significant amount of new music, all of which was recorded as demos, it was only ever performed in a private, informal reading in June 1988. By the time the play was staged again in December 1988, it had already evolved into version 2.

==== Act 1 ====
In the year 2064, in the InCity control room ("Fanfare for the Bottom Line"), the Master Babble Articulator teaches its Clone to speak. The MBA announces the "final event" to the citizens of Superbia, and prepares the Clone by filling his memory banks with information about how Superbian society functions ("Discopy #001 (Superbia)").

In the Outland, Josh's family prepares for dinner and wonder where Josh has gone. He emerges from the basement with a "music box", which is actually a walkman, claiming that it can restore emotions. Josh plays it for his sister Jennifer, who does not react. Mop suggests that Josh may have better luck with Elizabeth, who was invited over. Elizabeth arrives just as the M.T. announces the final act event, which will involve the detonation of multiple nuclear warheads. Recognizing what is planned, Josh decides to spend his last 35 hours partying in InCity ("Too Cold To Care"). Elizabeth chases him down but he rejects her, leaving her with the music box as a parting gift.

On the InCity shuttle, Josh meets Studd Starr and his droid Chip, who tells Josh how to sneak past InCity's bouncer. Elizabeth has an emotional awakening and decides to follow Josh ("He Said"). Back in the InCity control room, the M.B.A. begins to fill the Clone with information on how Superbia was conceived (Discopy #002 "The Birth of Superbia"). Studd tells of Josh's arrival to the MBA, who determines to keep Josh alive as he may be useful. Chip's advice turns out to be false, but Josh is led in by a mysterious In named Roi ("Face Value"). As Elizabeth leaves Outland, she is torn between her life of safety and the world of emotions she had overlooked in favor of the MT ("Pale Blue Square").

Roi gets Josh to plug in as they arrive ("InCity"), and they run into Studd and Chip. Elizabeth enters to tell Josh about her newfound feelings, but Josh brushes her off as Roi drags him away, leaving Elizabeth with Studd. In Outland, Josh's family watches as Josh and Roi having sex is broadcast on the MT ("Doin' it on the Air"). The MT announces Josh and Roi's love scene has earned him a Face Award nomination. Studd has also been nominated, but is unable to celebrate as Elizabeth has locked herself in the bathroom after refusing to join a threesome with him and Chip. Elizabeth writes Josh a note warning him about Roi, and telling him about her experience with feelings. The Clone begins to learn Josh's name as the MBA decides that Josh would make an ideal spokesman for the final act event. The MT announces the full list of nominees as everyone looks forward to the awards ("Septet").

After a massive production number ("A Tribute to Plastic Surgery") the awards begin. The nominees are joined by Studd's agent Tim Pursent. Elizabeth attempts to get Josh to speak with her in private by telling him she has a letter for him, but Roi prevents Josh from catching on by plugging him in. Elizabeth tries to remove the plug but is stopped by Roi. William Marcel is ushered onto the stage to present his speech, where he deviates from his script. The feed is cut and he is hit before the cameras roll again and he finishes his speech. Josh wins the awards, completely turning him into an In. Elizabeth tries to get through to him, only for Roi to smash the music box and send her to the Outer Obscurity prison satellite as the countdown to the final act begins ("Limelight").

==== Act 2 ====
In the InCity control room, the M.B.A. teaches the clone about the process of contentrification by replaying InCity's first broadcast, Let's All Sing, performed by Mick Knife ("Tapecopy #002 Continued (The First Broadcast)")

On Outer Obscurity, the faint voice of William Marcel and other inhabitants can be heard watching over and expressing concern for Elizabeth, as she stares blankly at the broken M.T. in her cell. In InCity, Josh's rising star is cut off when Studd denounces him on air ("Gettim' While He's Hot"). Josh is sent to Outer Obscurity as Studd takes his place as Face of the Year. Studd apologizes to the M.B.A. for disobeying his orders, and the M.B.A. designates Studd with the role of the 'first victim' in the final act. The M.B.A. then turns his attention back to the Clone and fills his memory banks with content about America's destruction and the commercialization of nuclear war ("Discopy #003 (The Decline of Man)")

At Outer Obscurity, William Marcel brings Josh to Elizabeth's cell. He tries to speak with Elizabeth, but she is unresponsive. As he goes to remove the broken M.T. from the cell, Elizabeth gives him a glare and he leaves. Marcel's voice can be heard in the distance talking with other Outer Obscurity inhabitants about Elizabeth and Josh's condition. Elizabeth claims her undying love to the broken M.T. ("I Won't Close My Eyes"), as Josh begins to wake up and reassemble the broken music box. accidentally electrocutes herself when she attempts to grab onto the exposed wires. Josh's emotions are restored from the tragedy but he realizes what is happening too late and is unable to save Elizabeth.

A tragedy-stricken Josh returns to InCity to confront the M.B.A., who has finished loading the Clone with the last of the information necessary to turn the clone into a full-featured Articulator. The M.B.A. reveals to Josh that he has created hundreds of Articulators, and will move to space to seek out the Bottom Line, leaving the humans to die in a nuclear holocaust. Josh attempts to play the music box as he argues with the M.B.A., but fails. The M.B.A. offers for Josh to come with him, as they will need humans for a zoo as a historical archive of past civilization, and offers Roi to Josh as a companion. It's revealed that Roi has had her insides replaced with machine components. Sickened, Josh refuses the M.B.A.'s offer and is left alone. He apologizes to the earth as the countdown reaches its conclusion.

=== Superbia version 2 (1988–1991) ===
The tone of this version is even darker and more pessimistic, discarding much of the comedy seen in previous drafts, with the music box being notably absent and replaced instead by a rose, mistakenly referred to by Josh as a "tree". The most significant change Larson implemented in the transition to version 2 is the MBA's plan to eradicate all Ins and Outs from the outset through a process called "delimbination", in which their limbs and torso are removed and their head is suspended in a container so they can be forced to watch a screen continuously. Larson historian J. Collis speculates that the darker tone reflects the composer's growing frustrations about his career: producers were still not touching Superbia despite all the work Larson put into it, and his friends like his childhood friend Matt O'Grady were getting steady jobs in their fields while he was still an impoverished composer.

This version of the show was first performed at Playwrights Horizons on December 22, 1988. It received many smaller rewrites, such as removing the character of William Marcel and expanding Mick Knife to take his role in the story, before being performed again at Village Gate on September 11, 1989. The final performance of the show was held in December 1991 at The Public Theater.

==== Act 1 ====
The theater's curtains pull away to reveal a glossy stage and projections of stars and planets on a rear scrim ("Fanfare for the Bottom Line").

In the Outland, Josh's family watch the MT with Josh's MBA-assigned mate Elizabeth. A special rerun of the very first Superbian broadcast plays featuring rock star Mick Knife, who declares to the people of Earth that everything is fine, war is over, and the only thing people need to do is plug into their power sockets or grab the wires in their MTs and get high ("Let's All Sing"). As Josh enters from exploring a forbidden zone, the MT announces humanity will enter its next stage where the Ins and Outs are "The Victims." Recognizing what is planned, Josh decides to spend his last 35 hours partying in InCity ("Too Cold To Care"). Elizabeth chases him down but he rejects her, giving her a rose and a passionate kiss as a parting gift.

On the InCity shuttle, Josh meets Studd Starr and his droid Chip, who tells Josh how to sneak past InCity's bouncer. Elizabeth has an emotional awakening and decides to follow Josh ("Uncomfortable"). Studd tells of Josh's arrival to the MBA, who is preparing an advert about humanity's upcoming "Delimbination". Chip's advice turns out to be false, but Josh is led in by a mysterious In named Roi ("Face Value"). As Elizabeth leaves Outland, she is torn between her life of safety and the world of emotions she had overlooked in favor of the MT ("Pale Blue Square").

Roi gets Josh to plug in as they arrive ("InCity"), and they run into Studd and Chip. Elizabeth enters, but Josh brushes her off as Roi drags him away, leaving Elizabeth with Studd. In Outland, Josh's family watches as Josh and Roi having sex is broadcast on the MT ("Doin' it on the Air"). Josh feels guilty over his actions the next morning, choosing to plug in to numb himself ("LCD Readout"). The MT announces Josh and Roi's love scene has earned him a Face Award nomination. Studd has also been nominated, but is unable to celebrate as Elizabeth has locked herself in the bathroom after refusing to join a threesome with him and Chip. Elizabeth writes Josh a note telling him to forget the previous night and try again. The MBA decides that Josh would make an ideal spokesman and first victim for the Delimbination. The MT announces the full list of nominees as everyone looks forward to the awards ("Sextet").

==== Act 2 ====
After a massive production number ("A Tribute to Plastic Surgery") the awards begin. The nominees are joined by Studd's agent Tim Pursent. Elizabeth's note is intercepted by Roi, who prevents Josh from reading it by plugging him in. Mick Knife comes out to give a speech, but proceeds to decry the world he has created and is booed off. Josh wins the awards, completely turning him into an In. Elizabeth tries to get through to him, only for Roi to send her to the Outer Obscurity prison satellite ("Limelight").

On Outer Obscurity, Elizabeth has a nightmare while watching the MBA's Delimbination announcement ("Elizabeth's Nightmare"). The MBA declares that humanity is no longer cost-effective, so all people will have their limbs and torsos removed before being hooked up to life support, staring forever at their screens. Elizabeth wakes up from her nightmare and smashes her cell's MT.

In InCity, Josh's rising star is cut off when Studd denounces him on air ("Gettim' While He's Hot"). Josh is sent to Outer Obscurity as Studd takes his place as Face of the Year and the Delimbination spokesman, while Josh's family are disappointed they won't also get to "do it on the air" ("Doin' it On the Air (Reprise)"). At Outer Obscurity, Mick Knife brings Josh to Elizabeth's cell. Elizabeth claims her undying love to the broken MT ("I Won't Close My Eyes") and accidentally electrocutes herself when she attempts to grab onto the exposed wires. Josh's emotions are restored from the tragedy as he reads her note. He repeats "Love Has No Bottom Line" as Delimbination begins. Earlier drafts of version 2 instead include an ending in which William Marcel offers Josh a sense of hope after Elizabeth has died.

== Musical numbers ==
=== 1984 ===
Act 1

- "Prelude" - Company
- "A Pint Ain't a Pint" - Winston and Proleman
- "Hopeless Fancy" - Prole Woman
- "Shadow" - Winston and Company
- "In Your Eyes" - Winston and Julia
- "Hate Week" - Inner Party
- "After the Revolution" - Winston and Julia
- "The Brotherhood" - O'Brien
- "The Doctrine" - Ballet

Act 2

- "Hate Week (Reprise)" - Company
- "It Could Be Worse" - Parson and Syme, Low Life Chorus
- "S.O.S." - Winston
- "Finale" - Company

"After the Revolution" was eventually rewritten into the song "Ever After" for Superbia version 1, and "The Brotherhood" was repurposed briefly as "The Electric Gate" in the earliest versions of Superbia. "S.O.S." was later released on The Jonathan Larson Project album; it is noted by producer and historian Jennifer Ashley Tepper as being the most indicative in the 1984 score of the cross-genre blend that Larson would more clearly demonstrate with Superbia.

=== Superbia pre-version 1 ===
Act 1

- "Intro to Superbia" - MBA, Company
- "One of these Days" - Josh
- "Keep an Eye on Her" - Mr. and Mrs Prod
- "Where I Come From" - Josh and Elizabeth
- "The Meaningless Game - Mop, Pop and Jennifer
- "After the Revolution" - Josh and Elizabeth
- "The Electric Gate" - Hank
- "Face Value" - Bouncer, Josh, Roi, Company
- "Incity" - Roi, Company

Act 2

- "On the Air" - Mop, Pop and Jennifer
- "Today" - M.T., Roi, Josh, Elizabeth, Studd, Hank
- "A Musical Tribute to Plastic Surgery" - Company
- "Acceptance" - Josh
- "Superbia (Reprise)" - Ins
- "Come To Your Senses" - Elizabeth
- "Bottom Line" MBA, Company

=== Superbia version 1 ===
Act 1

- "Fanfare for the Bottom Line" - Prologue
- "Tapecopy #001 (Superbia)" - MBA, Company
- "Too Cold To Care" - Josh
- "Eye On Her/Mr. Hammerstein II" - Mr. and Mrs Prod, Elizabeth
- "Turn the Key (Note: Later versions of the V1 script replaced Turn the Key with an updated version, "Turn the Key II", which integrated the leitmotif of "Come To Your Senses" and included several references to various musicals.)" - Josh and Elizabeth
- "Ever After" - Josh and Elizabeth
- "She Hates Me" - Josh
- "Freedom" - Hank
- "Face Value" - Bouncer, Josh, Roi, Company
- "Tapecopy #002 (Let's All Sing)" - Mick Knife and Company

Act 2

- "Incity" - Roi, Company
- "Doin' it on the Air" - Mop, Pop and Jennifer
- "Doin' it on the Air (Encore) - Mop, Pop and Jennifer
- "Sextet" - M.T., Roi, Josh, Elizabeth, Studd, Hank
- "A Tribute to Plastic Surgery" - Company
- "Limelight" - Josh, Hank
- "Come To Your Senses" - Elizabeth

=== Superbia version 1.5 ===
Act 1

- "Fanfare for the Bottom Line" - Prologue
- "Discopy #001 (Superbia)" - Master Babble Articulator and Company
- "Too Cold To Care" - Josh
- "He Said" - Elizabeth
- "Discopy #002 (The Birth of Superbia)" - Company
- "Face Value" - Bouncer, Josh, Roi, Company
- "The Pale Blue Square" - Elizabeth
- "InCity" - Roi and Company
- "Doin' It On the Air" - Mop, Pop and Jennifer
- "Doin' It On The Air (Encore)" - Mop, Pop and Jennifer
- "Sextet" - M.T., Roi, Josh, Elizabeth, Studd, M.B.A and Clone
- "A Tribute to Plastic Surgery" - Company
- "Limelight" - Josh

Act 2

- "Discopy #002 (Continued - Let's All Sing) - Mick Knife & Company
- "Gettim' While He's Hot" - Tim Pursent, Studd, and Prods
- "Discopy #003 (The Decline of Man)" - Master Babble Articulator & Company
- "I Won't Close My Eyes" - Elizabeth

=== Superbia version 2 ===
Act 1

- "Fanfare for the Bottom Line" - Prologue
- "Let's All Sing" - Mick Knife and Company
- "Too Cold To Care" - Josh
- "Uncomfortable" - Elizabeth
- "Delimbination" - Company
- "Face Value" - Bouncer, Josh, Roi, Company
- "Pale Blue Square" - Elizabeth
- "Incity" - Roi and Company
- "Doin' It On the Air" - Mop, Pop and Jennifer
- "Doin' It On The Air (Encore)" - Mop, Pop and Jennifer
- "LCD Readout" - Josh
- "Sextet" - M.T., Roi, Josh, Elizabeth, Studd, M.B.A.

Act 2

- "A Tribute to Plastic Surgery" - Company
- "Limelight" - Josh
- "Elizabeth's Nightmare" - Company (Ballet)
- "Gettim' While He's Hot" - Tim Pursent, Studd, and Prods
- "Doin' It On the Air (Reprise)" - Mop, Pop, and Jennifer
- "I Won't Close My Eyes" - Elizabeth

=== Additional numbers ===
- "Finale" - Performed by Josh, Company, and the MBA in Version 1, is an evolution of the previous finale number, "Bottom Line". In this number, the MBA unleashes a chorus of robotic chanting about the Bottom Line while Josh and Elizabeth weave in snippets from classic musicals. Later V1 drafts featured a singing of the Gershwin song "Our Love is Here to Stay", followed by a reprise of "Ever After". The concluding sung lines of the final 1991 script for Version 2, "Love Has No Bottom Line," are also referred to as the "Finale" in certain script revisions.
- "Greenslime" - This song is a short commercial jingle that Josh's parents listen to on the TV in V1 drafts, and that Elizabeth overhears in the shuttle while traveling to InCity in the V2 drafts. The commercial is selling a bizarre product called Greenslime.
- "Easy" - A duet that was replaced by "LCD Readout" in later V2 drafts. Josh reflects on his experience as an In in Roi's bedroom while at the same time elsewhere, Elizabeth is beginning to write a letter to Josh. Elizabeth concludes that it's becoming easier to experience and appreciate her emotions, while Josh concludes that it's becoming easier to be emotionally numb and distant. Some later versions of this song are only a solo sung by Josh.

== Production ==
=== Early development (1982–1985) ===
Superbia began as an attempt by Larson to create a musical adaptation of the George Orwell novel Nineteen Eighty-Four. He began writing it shortly after graduating from Adelphi University in 1982, recording a demo of the score by 1983 and hoping to have it open on Broadway by the year 1984 itself.

With 1984, Larson condensed Orwell's novel into 60 pages across two acts, while his demo tape ran 45 minutes. The script focused on key scenes of Winston Smith meeting Julia and his torture in Room 101, with visuals used to flesh out details. Larson went so far as to sketch out basic stage design, including the idea of a two-way Telescreen framing the proscenium. Some songs from 1984 eventually found their way into Superbia, such as a song called "After the Revolution" which was rewritten into "Ever After."

However, while the Orwell estate showed interest in Larson's project, he was ultimately unable to secure the rights to Nineteen Eighty-Four due to the upcoming film adaptation. Though disappointed at the time, he would later reflect that it was probably for the best: with the exception of a few songs, the score was more traditional musical theater than the pop-rock sound he was looking for, and his lack of experience showed in songs laden with repetitive music and exposition. He also realized the traditional method of recording demos with just piano and vocals would not work for the level of complexity he was trying to achieve, which would be reflected in his later attempts to create more complex demos for all of his musicals. Nevertheless, he felt it was an important step in his career because it was his first serious attempt at writing a full-length musical.

==== 1984 becomes Superbia ====
Larson still wanted to create a dystopian science fiction musical using his intended cross-genre musical style. Taking the advice of one of his professors, he kept the material from this failed musical adaptation, eventually coming up with his own world during a visit to the nightclub Area in late 1984: Larson pictured the venue as though it were a massive space satellite where "the coolest of the cool" were sheltered from the grit of the outside world. Larson began writing the new show, Superbia, in earnest in 1985. Using what he learned from 1984, Larson's demos reflect an effort to more clearly demonstrate what he wanted the songs to sound like. He began composing on a 50 key Casio keyboard, and by 1987 he was composing on a full Yamaha DX7. Many of his custom synth patches were designed by friend Steve Skinner, who would later arrange the orchestrations for Rent. Where possible, Larson would record demos in a rented studio space, using his digital arrangements to create a more advanced sound. Several of Larson's friends contributed vocals to these demos, including future Broadway stars Marin Mazzie and Roger Bart.

=== The Superbia workshops (1985–1991) ===
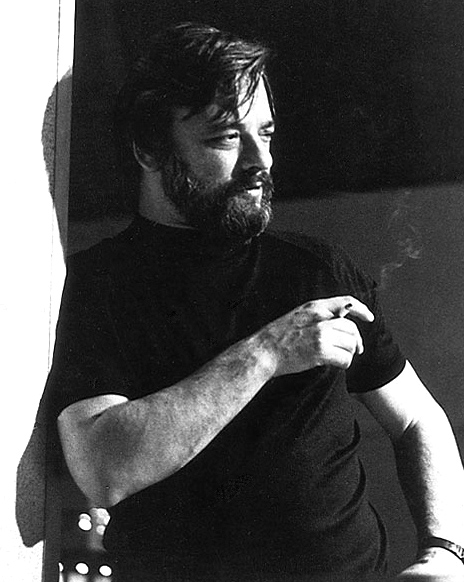
Stephen Sondheim was Larson's mentor and one of the few advocates for Superbia.

Songs from Superbia were first presented at the ASCAP Musical Theatre Workshop from November to December 1985, beginning the six-year workshop development of the musical. During this process, Larson received feedback from panels of various musical theater composers and writers, including his idol and eventual mentor Stephen Sondheim. Sondheim and some of his fellow panelists were complimentary of Larson's ambitions and desire to write in a new style, but others criticized the script's internal rules, complexity, and apparent weakness of its message. Larson presented more material at the Dramatists Guild in April 1986, where once again Sondheim was one of the few who praised the piece, although he noted the musical as written was too traditionally structured for what Larson was trying to do. Larson verbally sparred with 1776 book writer and Dramatists Guild president Peter Stone during the presentation. Not only did Stone dislike the musical, he vocally disagreed with the political message Larson was trying to tell, claiming that the idea of media making people emotionally disconnected was ridiculous. Larson's attempts to push back were met by Stone angrily talking over both him and a member of the audience who came to Larson's defense. This argument between two different generations of musical theater writers proved prophetic for the kind of rejections Larson would receive.

Following the musical theater workshop presentations, Larson began putting on readings of the full musical, including a private reading at Soundscape Studios and a public reading at The Public Theater in 1987. With Sondheim's help, Larson won the Richard Rodgers Development Grant for Superbia at the end of 1987, and used the money to fund a reading in December 1988 at Playwrights Horizons, produced by Ira Weitzman and directed by R. J. Cutler. The reading ended up being a disappointment for Larson, largely because he was unable to get a full rock band for his score, and was only allowed to have union performers, not the non-union actors whom he had written the show for. As a result, Larson's attempt at blending genres was lost in the single piano accompaniment, and the actors who were trained in more traditional musical theater were unable to perform the pop-rock vocals that the piece required. Sondheim, who had come to support his pupil, left after the first act. As a direct response to this failed workshop, Larson's friend Victoria Leacock helped Larson produce a concert version of Superbia at the Village Gate on September 11, 1989. Unlike the Playwrights Horizon workshop, this concert used a live band and the non-union actors Larson had wanted in his cast, including Bart and Timothy Britten Parker. The concert was one of only two times Superbia was performed with a full band.

Larson had an opportunity to develop and possibly stage Superbia in the United Kingdom when it was shortlisted for the Buxton Opera House's "Quest for New Musicals" competition. However he was unhappy with the contract for further consideration, which would have only guaranteed a workshop and limited his ability to pitch the show in New York. Ultimately, he turned it down for the chance to do a second reading of Superbia at The Public Theater in December 1991. J. Collis, author of the Larson oral history Boho Days: The Wider Works of Jonathan Larson, described not developing Superbia in the UK as "the biggest mistake Larson could have made." The second Public Theater reading ultimately did not go well: the reading was scheduled on the same day as the theater's Christmas party, which started right at intermission for Superbia. Larson's friend Paul Scott Goodman, who played the character Mick Knife in the reading, recalled that 25 people were in the audience for the start of the show, and at most 10 were back after intermission. This was the final major presentation of Superbia's material in Larson's lifetime.

=== Development stalls ===
Even after multiple workshops, Superbia was not ready for a full production. Larson was still unable to solve the story problems, and the show's content was too risky for Broadway producers and too technologically prohibitive for Off-Broadway theaters. Retrospective evaluations of the musical note even Broadway theaters at the time would have been unable to handle the rock-concert style sound design needed for Superbia. Larson himself was aware his style of music was largely beyond what contemporary theatrical sound designers were trained for, commenting on the eve of his death in 1996 that "I'm only as good as my soundboard operator."

Larson vented his frustrations over his stalled career in 1989 by writing a rock monologue titled 30/90, which depicted the aftermath of the failed Playwrights Horizons workshop. This was revised into Boho Days, eventually becoming his musical Tick, Tick... Boom! which he performed at his later artistic home of New York Theatre Workshop in 1992 and 1993. Though Sondheim was complimentary of Boho Days, he warned Larson to move on from Superbia, feeling his continued attachment to the piece was hindering Larson's career.

Although Larson tried adapting the Superbia script into a screenplay in 1990 or 1991, this was just a writing exercise and ultimately went nowhere. Eventually, he chose to focus on Rent, which he spent the remainder of his life developing. He died from a sudden aortic aneurysm the night before Rent's first Off-Broadway preview in 1996, having never seen a full production of Superbia.

== Cast ==
Numerous musical talent portrayed Larson's characters throughout Superbia's production. This comprehensive list presents what is currently known about the cast of each workshop and performance.

=== ASCAP/Dramatist's Guild Workshops and Original Demos (1985-1986) ===
- Scott Burkell - Josh
- Michael Brian Dunn - Josh (Turn the Key, Too Cold to Care (V1), She Hates Me, Limelight demos only)
- Marin Mazzie - Elizabeth
- Tia Speros-Harker - Roi, Mop (Dramatist's Guild only)
- Connie Harcar - Roi (ASCAP II only)
- Becky Ann Baker - Mop (Demos only)
- Barbara Marineau - M.T. and Mrs. Prod
- Jonathan Larson - Studd Starr, M.B.A., Bouncer, Pop
- Paris Barclay - Hank
- Mark Mazzie - Hank (Sextet demo only)
- Joe Aiello - Mr. Prod
- Andi Henig - Jennifer
- David Armstrong - Studd Starr (Dramatist's Guild only)

=== Soundscape Studios Private Reading (1987) ===
- Scott Burkell - Josh
- Marin Mazzie - Elizabeth
- Jace Alexander - Narrator, Bouncer
- Jonathan Larson - MBA, Mick Knife
- Tia Speros-Harker - Roi
- Barbara Marineau - M.T. and Mrs. Prod
- Joe Aiello - Mr. Prod, Tim Pursent
- Scott Bloom - Pop
- Andrea Wolper - Jennifer, Chip
- Jack Merrill - Studd Starr
- Richard Johnson - Hank
- Michael Lindsay - Clone, William Marcel
- Lisa Beth Miller - Fur

=== Martin Charnin Private Reading (1987) (Note: The Martin Charnin reading was text-only. Songs were played using pre-recorded demos.) ===
- Scott Burkell - Josh
- Marin Mazzie - Elizabeth
- Michael Lindsay - Clone
- Andrea Wolper - Jennifer, Chip

=== New York Public Theatre Reading (1987) ===
- Russ Jolly - Josh
- Marin Mazzie - Elizabeth
- Lisa Beth Miller - Roi
- Jack Merrill - Studd Starr
- Richard Johnson - Hank
- Barbara Marineau - MT, Mrs. Prod
- Michael Lindsay - Clone, Tim Pursent
- Jace Alexander - Wiliam Marcel, Mr. Prod
- Jonathan Larson - Mick Knife
- Ira Belgrade - MBA
- Michael Hannon - Pop
- Jody Abrahams - Mop
- Andrea Wolper - Jennifer, Chip

=== Informal Reading (1988) ===
- Jace Alexander - Josh
- Jane Krakowski - Elizabeth
- Gina Gershon - Roi
- Jack Merrill - Studd Starr
- Michael Lindsay - Clone, MT
- Jody Abrahams - Mop
- Andrea Wolper - Jennifer/Chip
- Barry Kramer - Pop, Tim Pursent

=== Playwrights Horizons (1988) ===
- Jace Alexander - Josh
- Diane Fratantoni - Elizabeth
- Valarie Pettiford - Roi/Teena
- John Schiappa - Studd Starr, Bruce
- Kay McClelland - MT (Note: A note in the pamphlet for the Playwrights Horizons performance states "and occasionally, others" play the M.T.)/Chip/Fur
- Gordon Paddison - Mick Knife/MBA
- Timothy Britten Parker - Bouncer/Tim Pursent/Bob
- Alma Cuervo - Mop/Attendroid
- Dan Strickler - Pop/William Marcel
- LuAnne Ponce - Jennifer

=== Village Gate (1989) ===
- Roger Bart - Josh
- Sara Weaver - Elizabeth
- Valarie Pettiford - Roi
- Dan Tubb - Studd Starr
- Max Cantor - MBA
- Timothy Britten Parker - Bouncer, Tim Pursent
- Jody Abrahams - MT
- Jonathan Larson - Mick Knife/Pop
- Beth Flynn - Chip/Mop
- Andrea Wolper - Jennifer
- Anthony Haden-Guest - Voice of the Bottom Line (Note: Provided narration in between the songs, as Village Gate was a concert-style performance)

=== New York Public Theater (1991) ===
- Roger Bart - Josh, Andy (Note: Listed characters such as Andy, Bette, Bob, and Bruce are members of Mick Knife's group while performing "Let's All Sing")
- Erica Gimpel - Elizabeth
- Lisa Beth Miller - Roi
- Jon Cavaluzzo - Studd Starr, Bruce
- Patrick Breen - MBA
- Jace Alexander - Bouncer, Pop, Tim Pursent, Bob
- Indira Christopherson - MT
- Paul Scott Goodman - Mick Knife
- Beth Flynn - Mop, Attendroid #567, Bette
- Andrea Wolper - Jennifer
- Lianna Pai - Chip

== Fate of the material ==
Larson's scripts, sheet music, and demos for Superbia and 1984 are kept in the Jonathan Larson Papers at the Library of Congress, and can be viewed on request. Victoria Leacock Hoffman's recording of the Village Gate performance is also part of the Library's collection.

Although Superbia itself was ultimately never produced, several songs from it have since been released through other means. When Tick, Tick... Boom! was adapted into a three-person musical in 2001, playwright David Auburn restructured the show to center it around the buildup to, the performance, and aftermath of the Playwrights Horizons Superbia workshop. This provided an opportunity to include "Come to Your Senses", which thematically fit with the new story. Larson's demos for "LCD Readout" and "One of These Days" were included on the 2007 album Jonathan Sings Larson. "One of These Days" and a song from 1984, "SOS", were included on The Jonathan Larson Project album released in 2019, and were featured in the 2025 Off-Broadway production.

When Tick, Tick... Boom! was adapted into the 2021 film, director Lin-Manuel Miranda and screenwriter Steven Levenson made an active effort to feature more of the Superbia songs. In addition to “Come to Your Senses”, two songs from Superbia are prominently featured in the movie: the previously released "LCD Readout", sung by Andrew Garfield as Larson during a workshop scene; and the song "Sextet"—performed in sections over the course of a montage of the film's characters—as the lyrics thematically fit with the story of the film. "Ever After" is also used in the film's score.

== Potential revival ==
An attempt was made in the mid-2000s to adapt Superbia into an animated film, but the project was cancelled during pre-production and never had a finished screenplay.

The depiction of the Superbia workshop in the 2021 film version of Tick, Tick... Boom! sparked renewed interest in Larson's unproduced musical. "Sextet", which had not been included on the film's soundtrack, was released as a single titled "Sextet Montage" on the occasion of what would have been Larson's 62nd birthday on February 4, 2022 after considerable fan demand. This in turn has sparked interest in Superbia receiving a full production or some form of release of the existing material. J. Collis highlights Larson's satire of his own era predicted the rise of reality television and social media, which would make it a strong contender for a potential revival, especially as technology has reached the point that Larson's score and design vision could more easily be achieved. However, while Collis believes that such a revival is possible, both he and Tick, Tick... Boom! director Miranda agree it would be very difficult to make, due to the musical's inherent complexity, its multiple drafts, and its unfinished state.
