= Jonathan Larson =

American composer, lyricist and playwright (1960–1996)

- Born: Jonathan David Larson; February 4, 1960; Mount Vernon, New York, U.S.
- Died: January 25, 1996 (aged 35); New York City, U.S.
- Education: Adelphi University (BFA)
- Occupations: Composer; lyricist; playwright
- Writing career
- Years active: 1982–1996
- Notable works: Rent (1996); Tick, Tick... Boom! (2001); Superbia (not officially published)

Jonathan David Larson (February 4, 1960 – January 25, 1996) was an American composer, lyricist and playwright, most famous for writing the musicals Rent and Tick, Tick... Boom!, which explored the social issues of multiculturalism, substance use disorder, and homophobia.

Larson had worked on both musicals throughout the late 1980s and into the 1990s. After several years of workshopping, Rent began an off-Broadway run in early 1996, though Larson died from an aortic dissection the day before its first preview performance. The show went on to enjoy critical and commercial success, and transferred to Broadway that April, becoming one of the longest-running Broadway productions. Larson posthumously received three Tony Awards and the Pulitzer Prize for Drama. Rent was also adapted into a 2005 film. Tick, Tick... Boom! received an off-Broadway production in 2001, and was also adapted into a 2021 film, in which Larson is portrayed by Andrew Garfield.

== Early life and education ==
Jonathan David Larson was born on February 4, 1960, in Mount Vernon, New York, to Nanette (née Notarius; 1927–2018) and Allan Larson (1925–2021) of White Plains, New York. His family was of Russian-Jewish origins. His grandfather, Bernard Isaac Lazarson, who was born in Russia, changed the family surname to Larson.

At an early age, Larson played the trumpet and tuba, sang in his school's choir, and took piano lessons. His early musical influences and his favorite rock musicians included Elton John, The Doors, The Who, and Billy Joel, as well as the classic composers of musical theatre, especially Stephen Sondheim. He also loved Pete Townshend, The Police, Prince, Liz Phair, and The Beatles. Larson attended White Plains High School, where he was also involved in acting, performing in lead roles in various productions, before graduating in 1978. He had a sister, Julie.

Larson attended Adelphi University in Garden City, New York, with a four-year scholarship as an acting major, in addition to performing in numerous plays and musical theatre, graduating in 1982 with a Bachelor of Fine Arts degree. Larson stopped acting to focus on compositions. During his college years, he began music composition, composing music first for small student productions, called cabarets, and later the score to a musical titled The Book of Good Love (Libro de Buen Amor), written by the department head, Jacques Burdick, who was also Larson's college mentor.

As a student at Adelphi University, Larson co-wrote Sacrimmoralinority, a Brechtian-themed cabaret musical and his first musical, with David Glenn Armstrong. It was first staged at Adelphi University in the winter of 1981. After Larson and Armstrong graduated in 1982, they renamed it Saved! - An Immoral Musical on the Moral Majority. It played a four-week showcase run at Rusty's Storefront Blitz, a small theatre on 42nd Street in New York, Manhattan, and won both authors a writing award from ASCAP.

After graduating, Larson participated in a summer stock theatre program at the Barn Theatre in Augusta, Michigan, as a piano player, which resulted in his earning an Equity card for membership in the Actors' Equity Association.

== Career and works ==
=== Superbia ===
In 1983, Larson planned to write a musical adaptation of George Orwell's book Nineteen Eighty-Four, which he planned to get produced in the year 1984; however, the Orwell estate denied him permission. Larson then began the process of adapting his work on 1984 into a futuristic story of his own, titled Superbia.

Superbia won the Richard Rodgers Production Award and the Richard Rodgers Development Grant. However, despite performances at Playwrights Horizons and a rock concert version produced by Larson's close friend and producer Victoria Leacock at the Village Gate in September 1989, Superbia never received a full production.

In the 2001 three-person musical version of Larson's monologue tick, tick... BOOM!, the 11 o'clock number from an earlier version of Superbia, "Come to Your Senses", was included. Another song from Superbia ("LCD Readout") was included on the 2007 album "Jonathan Sings Larson". In 2019, the song "One of These Days", originally sung by Josh near the beginning of the early drafts of Superbia, was included on the album "The Jonathan Larson Project". On February 4, 2022, the abridged "Sextet Montage" was released on streaming platforms as a single.

=== tick, tick... BOOM! ===
tick, tick... BOOM!, completed in 1991, was an autobiographical "rock monologue". This piece, written for only Larson with a piano and rock band, drew on his feelings of rejection caused by the disappointment of Superbia. The show was performed off-Broadway at the Village Gate in Greenwich Village, then at the Second Stage Theater on the Upper West Side. Both of these productions were produced by Victoria Leacock. Producer Jeffrey Seller saw a reading of Boho Days and expressed interest in producing Larson's musicals.

After Larson's death, Victoria Leacock and Robyn Goodman, with the permission of the Larson family, brought in playwright David Auburn to go through Larson's five versions of the rock monologue, and expand it for three actors. Stephen Oremus was hired to orchestrate and be the musical director, as he had already been working on the tour of RENT. The stage version premiered off-Broadway in 2001 and starred Raúl Esparza as Larson, a performance for which he earned an Obie Award. It has since been produced on a West End theatre.

A film adaptation of tick, tick... BOOM!, directed by Lin-Manuel Miranda and starring Andrew Garfield (in an Academy Award nominated performance) as Larson, with a rewritten script by Steven Levenson was released on Netflix on November 12, 2021.

=== Rent ===
In 1989, Larson began collaborating with playwright Billy Aronson on a musical updating Giacomo Puccini's La bohème to take place in contemporary New York City. Larson conceived the title, Rent, and re-centered the narrative in the East Village, reflecting the lives of artists and young people in the shadow of the AIDS epidemic.

The show underwent significant development at the New York Theatre Workshop (NYTW), starting with staged readings in 1993 and culminating in a three-week studio production in late 1994. Producer Jeffrey Seller became a crucial champion during this period. Tragically, Larson died from an aortic dissection on January 25, 1996, the morning of Rent's first off-Broadway preview performance at NYTW.

The show proceeded, garnering immense critical and popular success, and transferred to Broadway's Nederlander Theatre on April 29, 1996. Rent became a cultural phenomenon, winning numerous prestigious awards, including a posthumous Pulitzer Prize for Drama and several Tony Awards for Larson.

== Death ==
In the days preceding Rent's first previews in January 1996, Larson began experiencing pain in his chest and back, fever, dizziness, and shortness of breath. He was assessed at Cabrini Medical Center on January 21 and at St. Vincent's Hospital on January 23, but doctors found nothing of concern in X-rays or electrocardiograms (ECGs), and variously attributed his symptoms to stress, food poisoning, or a virus. A note from one doctor on an ECG speculated about a possible myocardial infarction, but the matter was not further pursued. Larson continued to complain of severe and persistent pain and discomfort throughout this period.

At around 12:30 a.m. on January 25, 1996, the scheduled day of the first preview performance, Larson returned to his apartment from a production meeting, and collapsed in the kitchen. At around 3 a.m., (Note: Variously reported as 3:00, "around 3:30", or 3:40 a.m.) his body was discovered by his roommate, who called emergency services and attempted CPR. Police arrived and pronounced Larson dead at the scene, aged 35. The cause of death was found to be an aortic dissection.

A court found that Larson had been misdiagnosed by doctors at both hospitals he had visited. A medical malpractice lawsuit was settled for an undisclosed amount. The New York State Department of Health launched an investigation and concluded that it is possible he could have lived if the aortic dissection had been properly diagnosed and treated with cardiac surgery. Cabrini Medical Center and St. Vincent's Hospital were fined $10,000 and $6,000, respectively.

Larson may have had an undiagnosed case of Marfan syndrome, which increases the risk of aortic dissection. That possibility was publicly promoted by the National Marfan Foundation to raise awareness about the condition, at the urging of the New York State Health Department.

== Legacy ==
Rent played on Broadway at the Nederlander Theatre from its debut in April 1996 until September 7, 2008. It is the 12th longest running show in Broadway history. In addition, it has toured throughout the United States, Canada, Brazil, Japan, United Kingdom, Australia, China, Singapore, Philippines, Mexico, Germany, Poland, and throughout Europe, as well as in other locations. A film version of Rent was released in 2005.

After his death, Larson's family and friends started the Jonathan Larson Performing Arts Foundation to provide monetary grants to artists, especially musical theatre composers and writers, to support their creative work. The Jonathan Larson Grants are now administered by the American Theatre Wing, thanks to an endowment funded by the Foundation and the Larson Family.

His semi-autobiographical musical Tick, Tick... Boom! premiered off-Broadway in May 2001, toured the United States in 2003, and premiered in London in May 2005. The show was later revived in London's West End in May 2009 and twice off-Broadway in June 2014 and October 2016.

In December 2003, Larson's work was given to the Library of Congress. The collection includes numerous musicals, revues, cabarets, pop songs, dance and video projects – both produced and un-produced.

Less than three years after Rent closed on Broadway, the show was revived off-Broadway at Stage 1 of New World Stages just outside the Theater District. The show was directed by Michael Greif, who had directed the original productions. The show began previews on July 14, 2011, and opened August 11, 2011.

Andrew Garfield as Jonathan Larson in Tick, Tick... Boom!

From October 9 to 14, 2018, Feinstein's/54 Below presented The Jonathan Larson Project, a concert of several previously unheard songs by Larson. The show was conceived and directed by Jennifer Ashley Tepper. It starred George Salazar, Lauren Marcus, Andy Mientus, Krysta Rodriguez, and Nick Blaemire. A CD of the show was released by Ghostlight Records in April 2019. A full off-Broadway version of the project opened at the Orpheum Theatre on March 10, 2025, with previews beginning February 14. The show made its UK premier at the Southwark Playhouse in London, where it ran from July 9th to August 22nd, 2026.

Jonathan is portrayed by actor Andrew Garfield in the biographical musical drama Tick, Tick... Boom! which was released on the streaming service Netflix on November 19, 2021. The film received generally positive reviews from critics, with high praise for director Lin-Manuel Miranda’s direction in his directorial debut, score, and musical sequences, and Garfield's performance garnering universal acclaim. It was named one of the best films of 2021 by the American Film Institute, and earned Garfield the Golden Globe Award for Best Actor in a Motion Picture – Musical or Comedy as well as Best Lead Actor nominations for the Academy Award, Screen Actors Guild Award and Critics Choice Movie Award.

=== Jonathan Larson Grants ===
In memory of Larson, in 1996, the Larson family along with the Jonathan Larson Performing Arts Foundation established an award honoring emerging musical theater writers and composers. In 2008, the American Theatre Wing adopted and continued on the legacy through the Jonathan Larson Grants, an unrestricted cash gift to aid in the creative endeavors of the writers and promote their work. Notable winners of the grant include Dave Malloy, Laurence O'Keefe, Nell Benjamin, Amanda Green, Joe Iconis, Pasek and Paul, Shaina Taub and Michael R. Jackson.

== Personal life ==
In college, Larson dated Victoria Leacock. He also dated a dancer for four years who sometimes left him for other men, though she eventually left him for a woman. These experiences influenced the autobiographical aspects of Rent.

Larson lived and died in a loft with no heat on the fourth floor of 508 Greenwich Street, on the corner of Greenwich Street and Spring Street in Lower Manhattan. He lived with various roommates over the years, including Greg Beals, a journalist for Newsweek magazine and the brother of actress Jennifer Beals. For a while, he and his roommates kept an illegal wood-burning stove because of lack of heat in their building.

Larson also had a close connection to Stephen Sondheim, and considered him like his mentor. It was Sondheim who convinced him to go into composing rather than becoming an actor, and the two had a close connection with discussion of Larson's musicals. Over the years, Larson would write to Sondheim and send letters discussing his musicals and taking criticism from him.They last spoke two months before Larson passed.

From the spring of 1985, when he was 25 years old, Larson worked weekends as a waiter at the Moondance Diner, while working on composing and writing musicals during the week. Many people came to the diner to meet Larson. He was involved in writing the employee manual. Jesse L. Martin worked as Larson's waiting trainee at the diner; Martin later performed the role of Tom Collins in the original cast of Rent. Larson quit the diner on October 21, 1995, as Rent was being produced by the New York Theatre Workshop.

== Awards and nominations ==
| Year | Award | Category | Work | Result |
|---|---|---|---|---|
| 1996 | Pulitzer Prize | Drama | Rent | Won |
| 1996 | Tony Award | Best Book of a Musical | Rent | Won |
| 1996 | Tony Award | Best Musical | Rent | Won |
| 1996 | Tony Award | Best Original Score | Rent | Won |
| 1996 | Drama Desk Award | Outstanding Book of a Musical | Rent | Won |
| 1996 | Drama Desk Award | Outstanding Music | Rent | Won |
| 1996 | Drama Desk Award | Outstanding Lyrics | Rent | Won |
| 1996 | New York Drama Critics' Circle | Best Musical | Rent | Won |
| 2002 | Drama Desk Award | Outstanding Book of a Musical | Tick, Tick... Boom! | Nominated |
| 2002 | Drama Desk Award | Outstanding Music | Tick, Tick... Boom! | Nominated |
| 2002 | Drama Desk Award | Outstanding Lyrics | Tick, Tick... Boom! | Nominated |
