= Tick, Tick... Boom! =

Musical by Jonathan Larson

- 2016 off-Broadway revival windowcard
- Music: Jonathan Larson
- Lyrics: Jonathan Larson
- Book: Jonathan Larson
- Script consultant: David Auburn
- Premiere: May 23, 2001: Jane Street Theater, Manhattan, New York City
- Productions: 2001 Off-Broadway; 2003 US Tour; 2005 London; 2009 West End; 2014 Encores! Off-Center; 2016 Off-Broadway; 2024 Kennedy Center
- Awards: Outer Critics Circle Award for Outstanding Off-Broadway Musical

Tick, Tick... Boom! (styled as tick, tick... BOOM!) is a musical by Jonathan Larson. It tells the story of an aspiring composer named Jon, who lives in New York City in 1990. Jon is worried he has made the wrong career choice to be part of the performing arts. The story is semi-autobiographical, as stated by Larson's father in the liner notes of the cast recording – Larson had been trying to establish himself in theater since the early 1980s.

Larson began to perform the piece as a solo work in 1990. After his death in 1996, it was revised and revamped by playwright David Auburn as a three-actor piece and was premiered off-Broadway in 2001. Since then, the show has had an Off West End production, a West End production, an American national tour, two Off-Broadway revivals, in 2014 and 2016, and numerous local and international productions.

A film adaptation, directed by Lin-Manuel Miranda and starring Andrew Garfield in the lead role, was released by Netflix in November 2021. It was generally well received by critics, and Garfield received a nomination for the Academy Award for Best Actor for his performance.

== History ==
The show was first performed as a workshop between September 6 and September 9, 1990, by Jonathan Larson at the off-Broadway playhouse Second Stage Theater under the title Boho Days. Larson revised the developing piece following the Second Stage workshop, changing the title to Tick, Tick... Boom!, and presented with him as performer in November 1991 at the Village Gate (produced by Larson's college friend Victoria Leacock), and then later in 1992 and 1993 in the "O Solo Mio" fests at New York Theatre Workshop. Larson performed the show as a "rock monologue", a new form of theatre at the time. The performance attracted the attention of a young producer named Jeffrey Seller, who became a fan of Larson's work. In 1995, he saw the New York Theatre Workshop production of Larson's musical Rent and convinced his fellow producers to bring it to Broadway.

After Larson's death in 1996, Leacock asked David Auburn, author of the Pulitzer Prize-winning play Proof, to reconfigure Tick, Tick... Boom!. He restructured the monologue into a three-actor musical, with one actor playing Jon and the other two actors playing Michael and Susan, as well as all the other roles in the show. The script and score were streamlined and edited. This revised version of the piece premiered off-Broadway at the Jane Street Theater on May 23, 2001. Auburn received credit as "Script Consultant".

== Plot ==
Jon is an aspiring composer for musical theater, who lives in SoHo, New York. The year is 1990, and as his 30th birthday approaches, Jon is worried about his aging and lack of achievement ("30/90"). Michael, a friend of Jon's since childhood, gave up acting to pursue a more lucrative career in marketing. Susan, Jon's girlfriend, is a dancer who teaches ballet to "wealthy and untalented children". On the roof of his apartment building, Jon reveals that he is nervous about an upcoming workshop of his newest musical, SUPERBIA. When Susan comes to join him, he comments on her dress and how beautiful it makes her look ("Green Green Dress").

The next morning, Susan asks Jon about the possibility of leaving New York. Jon is torn between following his dream of composing and opting for security and family in a different career ("Johnny Can’t Decide"). His reverie is cut short when he remembers his day job as a waiter in a SoHo diner ("Sunday").

After work, Michael picks Jon up in his brand new BMW to show Jon his new apartment. Michael exults at the thought of a life of luxury ("No More"), and pressures Jon further to consider changing his career path. He agrees to accompany Michael to work the next day and visit a brainstorming session at his firm. Back at home, Jon plans to spend the remainder of the evening composing, but is interrupted by a call from Susan ("Therapy").

At Michael's office, the brainstorming session involves naming a cooking fat substitute through a convoluted process. Jon sees the futility of the process and his unwillingness to cooperate gets him removed from the meeting. As Jon drives Michael to the airport for a business trip, they argue about the meeting. Michael tells Jon that the life Susan wants doesn't sound bad, and that he wishes his job could give him the chance to settle down ("Real Life").

After dropping Michael off, Jon goes to a rehearsal for SUPERBIA, but not before stopping to get a snack of Twinkies ("Sugar"). At the market, he spies Karessa Johnson, one of his actors for SUPERBIA. She reveals a similar weakness for Twinkies, and this leads to a sudden friendship between the two. After the rehearsal, Susan sees Jon and Karessa walking together and becomes jealous. Jon begs Susan to stay and be with him. Despite this, she leaves for home, and Jon thinks about what may have happened to make her behave this way ("See Her Smile").

The next morning, Jon arrives early at the theater for the workshop of SUPERBIA. Karessa steals the show with her performance of "Come to Your Senses". Jon gets many congratulations, but no offers to produce the show, and so, in his eyes, the workshop has been a failure. Jon visits Michael and tells him that he is through with music. Michael says that while he enjoys how he makes a lot more money now, he finds the job to be banal and unrewarding. The two argue, and Jon yells at Michael for not understanding fear or insecurity. Michael responds by telling Jon that he is HIV-positive. Shocked, Jon leaves quickly and wanders through Central Park until he finds himself at the closed Delacorte Theater. He finds an old rehearsal piano and begins to play it while collecting his thoughts. Jon ponders on whether the amount of sacrifice required for his career in music is worth it, and whether those telling him to "have it all, play the game" are right ("Why"). Ultimately, he realizes that he will only be happy as a professional composer, no matter what hardships that may bring.

The next morning is Jon's thirtieth birthday party ("30/90 (Reprise)"). He sees Susan, who is getting ready to leave. She gives him his birthday gift: a thousand sheets of blank manuscript paper. They agree to write to each other, and she leaves. The phone rings, and the caller is Jon's idol, Stephen Sondheim. Sondheim leaves Jon his contact information so they can meet and discuss SUPERBIA. Jon realizes that he is surrounded by friends and that his talents are finally being recognized ("Louder than Words").

== Characters ==
- Jonathan (also called: Jon, Johnny) Voice Type: Tenor, A_{2}–A_{4}
- Michael (also plays: Jon's Dad, Executive, Temp, Market research guy, Counter guy, Rosa Stevens) Voice Type: Baritenor, B♭_{2}–G♭_{4}
- Susan (also plays: Rosa Stevens, Jon's Mom, Secretary, Judy Wright, Karessa Johnson) Voice Type: Mezzo-soprano, A_{3}–D_{5}

== Musical numbers ==
- "30/90" – Jon, Michael, Susan
- "Green Green Dress" – Jon, Susan
- "Johnny Can't Decide" – Jon, Susan, Michael
- "Sunday" – Jon and Diner Patrons
- "No More" – Michael, Jon
- "Therapy" – Jon, Susan
- "Real Life" – Michael and Company
- "Sugar" – Jon, Karessa, Counter Guy
- "See Her Smile" – Jon and Company (including a reprise of "Real Life")
- "Come to Your Senses" – Karessa
- "Why" – Jon
- "30/90 (Reprise)" – Jon
- "Louder Than Words" – Company

Notes

- "No More" features a sample from "Movin' On Up", the theme song of the television series The Jeffersons
- "Sunday", Jon's song at the diner, is based on the Act I Finale from the Stephen Sondheim musical Sunday in the Park with George; Larson conceived it as a humorous homage to Sondheim, one of his biggest influences.
- In "Johnny Can't Decide", all the characters refer to themselves in the third-person, just like George in the song "Lesson #8" from Sunday in the Park with George. In the monologue version of the musical, only Jon did this.
- Another reference to Sondheim is present in the song "Why". Not only mentioning West Side Story in the lyrics, the song utilizes the same tritone made famous in the West Side Story song "Maria".
- "Why" contains fragments of several other songs: "Yellow Bird", "Let's Go Fly a Kite" from the film Mary Poppins, "Cool" and "Tonight – Quintet" both from West Side Story, and "Come to Your Senses" from Larson's Superbia.
- On the cast recording, there is an additional song cut from the final version of the show, "Boho Days". This track is one of the few recordings of Larson's voice publicly available. It was extracted from a demo tape recorded by Larson during the development of Tick, Tick... Boom!
- On the 1989 demo album of Tick, Tick... Boom!, one of the tracks is "Why," performed by Jonathan Larson himself. In this version, instead of "Come to Your Senses" - which was added after Larson's death - there are excerpts from "LCD Readout" and "Too Cold to Care," both originating from Superbia. These two songs underwent the most extensive rewrites in Superbia's development, which is why Larson chose to feature them in "Why."

== Productions ==
=== Original off-Broadway production ===
The revamped musical premiered off-Broadway at the Jane Street Theater on May 23, 2001, and closed on January 6, 2002. Directed by Scott Schwartz, with choreography by Christopher Gattelli, the cast was Raúl Esparza as Jon, Jerry Dixon as Michael, and Amy Spanger as Susan. Molly Ringwald and Natascia Diaz later replaced Spanger as Susan, and Joey McIntyre replaced Esparza as Jon. The production received seven Drama Desk Award nominations, including Outstanding Musical, and won the Outer Critics Circle Award for Outstanding Off-Broadway Musical; Esparza won an Obie Award for his performance. The original cast recording was released in 2001 by RCA Victor Broadway. The off-Broadway production was imported to Seoul, South Korea briefly, with McIntyre, Dixon, and Diaz making up the cast.

=== Subsequent productions ===
2003 American national tour

A touring production of the show was directed by Schwartz, with Christian Campbell as Jon, Nikki Snelson as Susan, and Wilson Cruz as Michael. The tour performed in Dallas, Fort Lauderdale, West Palm Beach, East Lansing, Michigan, Philadelphia, Baltimore, Minneapolis, Hershey, Pennsylvania, Pittsburgh, Chicago, and Boston. Joey McIntyre joined the tour for its Boston run. Planned stops in Nashville and Washington, D.C. were canceled, in part because of the Iraq War discouraging ticket sales for a show with its title.

2005 London

Tick, Tick... Boom! opened in London at the Menier Chocolate Factory on May 31, 2005, running until August 28, 2005. Again directed by Scott Schwartz, the cast featured Neil Patrick Harris as Jon, Tee Jaye as Michael, and Cassidy Janson as Susan. Christian Campbell took over the role of Jon from Harris later in the run.

2005 California

A California production ran at the Rubicon Theatre Company in Ventura, California, from November 19, 2005, through December 18, 2005. Scott Schwartz directed, Brent Crayon as music director, with a cast including Andrew Samonsky as Jon, Wilson Cruz as Michael, and Natascia Diaz as Susan. The production moved to the Coronet Theatre, West Hollywood, California, through July 16, 2006, with Tami Tappan Damiano as Susan.

2005 Toronto

A Toronto production was mounted by Acting Up Stage Theatre Company at the Poor Alex Theatre in 2005. The director was Mario D'Alimonte, and the cast consisted of Dean Armstrong as Jon, Michael Dufays as Michael, and Daphne Moens as Susan.

2009 West End

Tick, Tick... Boom! had its West End premiere in a limited engagement at the Duchess Theatre from May 13–17, 2009, forming part of the 2009 Notes from New York season. Directed by Hannah Chissick, the cast comprised Paul Keating as Jon, Julie Atherton as Susan, and Leon Lopez as Michael.

2014 Encores! Off-Center

New York City Center's Encores! Off-Center series produced a revival of Tick, Tick... Boom! starring Lin-Manuel Miranda as Jon, Karen Olivo as Susan, and Leslie Odom Jr. as Michael. Performances were June 25 through 28, 2014. Oliver Butler directed.

2016 Off-Broadway

Tick, Tick... Boom! was revived in October 2016 at the Acorn Theater at Theatre Row, starring Ciara Renée, Nick Blaemire, and George Salazar. Previews began on October 4, the show opened on October 20, and it closed on December 18, 2016. It was directed by Jonathan Silverstein, the artistic director of Keen Company. Lilli Cooper took over the role of Susan on November 22, 2016.

2024 Kennedy Center

Directed by Neil Patrick Harris, who previously played Jon in the London premiere, starring Brandon Uranowitz as Jon, Denée Benton as Susan and Grey Henson as Michael, running from January 26 through February 4 as part of the Kennedy Center's Broadway Center Stage series. Unlike most productions, the show includes an ensemble.

=== Other productions ===
2008 Mexico

A production starring Marco Anthonio as Jon, Natalia Sosa as Susan and Beto Torres as Michael opened in Mexico in 2008. The three actors were later announced for a 2020 staged concert production of the musical.

2009 Westport

A production ran at the Westport Country Playhouse in Westport, Connecticut in the summer of 2008. It was directed by Scott Schwartz, who directed the original off-Broadway production, and starred Colin Hanlon as Jon, Wilson Cruz as Michael, and Pearl Sun as Susan.

2010 San Francisco

Theatre Rhinoceros presented the play at the Eureka Theatre from February 9 through 28, 2010.

2010 Germany

The German premiere of the musical opened on March 11, 2010, in Kerpen near Cologne. It was directed by Barbara Franck and Marco Maciejewski with musical supervision by Philipp Polzin. Jon was played by Oliver Morschel and Daniel Wichmann, Michael by Sascha Odendall and Joshua Vithayathil, and Susan by Marina Schmitz and Michaela Berg. The songs were performed in English, with scenes done in German.

2010 London

The Union Theatre performed a fringe production in April 2010, featuring Leanne Jones, Ashley Campbell, and Adam Rhys Davies. It was directed by Damian Sandys.

2011 Spain

A Spanish production ran at Teatro Lara, Madrid, from July 14 through 22, 2011, under the direction of Pablo Muñoz-Chápuli and starring Jorge Gonzalo as Jon, David Tortosa as Michael, and Laura Castrillón as Susan.

2012 Argentina

The 2012 Argentinian production of Tick, Tick... Boom! ran at the Maipo Kabaret Theatre under the direction of Nicolás Roberto and starred Andrés Espinel as Mike, Natalia Cesari as Susan, and Paul Jeannot as Jon.

2014 The Netherlands

Koen van Dijk directed a production with Tresore Producties in the Netherlands in 2014. He also translated the book and updated the story, adding in references to Skype and substituting AIDS for a brain tumor. The production starred John Vooijs as Jon, Renée van Wegberg as Susan, and Sander van Voorst tot Voorst as Mike.

2018 Czech Republic

The Czech premiere of the musical was performed at Theatre Na prádle Prague under the direction of Martin Vokoun and starred Peter Pecha as Mike, Lucia Jagerčíková as Susan, and Tomáš Vaněk as Jon.

2018 Hong Kong

A Cantonese production was performed in Ngau Chi Wan Civic Centre Theatre by theatre company Musical Trio in 2018.

2018 Brazil

A Portuguese production ran at Teatro FAAP in São Paulo from October 30, 2018, to January 31, 2019. It was directed by Leopoldo Pacheco and Bel Gomes and starred Bruno Narchi as Jon, Thiago Machado as Michael, and Giulia Nadruz as Susan.

2019 Taiwan

A production ran at the New Taipei City Arts Center in October 2019, featuring New York actor Matthew Bauman as Jon, Anthony Neely as Mike, and Ting-Fang Liu as Susan. Produced by the Tainaner Ensemble, the production was directed by New York director Darren Cohen.

2021 Shanghai

A Chinese production ran in Gong Stage from April 2, 2021 to April 11, 2021, then from June 22, 2021 to June 27, 2021. Cast included Yi-bin Zheng, Qi-sheng Ye, Zhen-kai Xia as Jon, Li-Tong Hsu, Hao-yu Chen, Hao-ran Liu as Susan, Ze Zhang, Le-tian Wang, Wei-gang Zhao as Michael. Produced by Cmusicals. Then in 2022, a long-term production ran in Strand Theatre from January 14, to September 12, which was once interrupted by 2022 Shanghai COVID-19 outbreak.

In 2024, Shanghai revival opened in Gong stage on April 12, 2024, the cast featured Er Mao and Meng-nan Qian as Jon, Jing-yuan Liao and Guo Hong as Susan, Jia-ming Tang and Ji-wen Xu as Michael. The revival production closed on April 21, 2024.

2022 Sweden

Produced by Fourth Wall Productions in Malmö and directed by Swedish director Helena Röhr. Jon played by Filip Vikström, Michael played by Erik Espinoza and Susan played by Kim Bergkvist.

2023 Australia

Produced by StoreyBoard Productions and directed by Tyran Parke. Jon played by Hugh Sheridan, Michael played by Finn Alexander and Susan played by Elenoa Rokobaro.

2023 Israel

Directed and translated by Roi Dolev, who will also star as Jon, with Inbal Zoashnin as Susan, and Snir Weiller as Michael. Performances are scheduled for October and November 2023 in Haifa and Tel Aviv.

2023 Austria

Presented with German texts and English songs at the Volksoper (Vienna, Austria), directed by Frédéric Buhr and starring Jakob Semotan as Jon, Juliette Khalil as Susan and Oliver Liebl as Michael. Performances were part of the 2023/24 and 2024/25 seasons.

2023 Poland

The production at Nova Scena of ROMA Musical Theatre in Warsaw opened on November 18, 2023 (as an open-ended run), directed by Wojciech Kępczyński, translated by Michał Wojnarowski. The opening night featured the cast of Marcin Franc as Jon, Maciej Dybowski as Michael and Maria Tyszkiewicz as Susan (the alternating cast includes Maciej Pawlak, Piotr Janusz and Anastazja Simińska respectively). Music direction is by Jakub Lubowicz.

2024 San Diego

A Cygnet Theatre production Will be played at the Old Town Theatre (San Diego, CA), directed by Katie Banville and starring AJ Rafael as Jon, Emma Nossal as Susan and Leo EBanks as Michael. Performances are running from July 3 through August 4. Music direction by Dr. Randi Ellen Rudolph.

2024 Singapore

Produced by Sight Lines and directed by Derrick Chew, Preston Lim (Jon), Ryan Ang (Michael), Vanessa Kee (Susan) star alongside Beatrice Jaymes Pung and Eric Larrea as the ensemble cast. Performances run from July 5 to 14 at KC Arts Centre.

2025 Portugal

Produced by Ultraproduções and directed by Bernardo Raposo, a Portuguese production ran from March 7 to April 6, 2025, at the Auditório Santa Joana Princesa in Lisbon, starring Miguel Cruz as Jon, David Gomes as Michael and Sara Madeira as Susan.

2025 Belgium

Produced by The Bridge Theatre and directed by Ewan Jones, the 2025 Belgium production starred Djavan van de Fliert (Jon), Dan Buckley (Michael), and Laura Marie Benson (Susan). Performances were held at Stassart House from 14 October to 2 November. Wout de Vocht (guitar), Rafael de Smet (bass), and Bram Iven (drums) formed the band alongside Musical Director Pietro Ramman (piano). The crew also included Musical Supervisor Mal Hall, Designer Stewart J Charlesworth, Lighting Designer Ben Jacobs, Sound Designer Vincent Debongnie, Production Manager Steve Bree, Sound Engineer Casper Le Compte, Stage Manager Sophie Lovelace, Sound Runner Mehmet Avcu, Costume Designer Dora Heller Russell, and Artistic Director Edward McMillan. The rendition was met with positive reviews from local critics.

2025 Chile

Produced by 3 Marias and directed by Ezequiel Fernanz, the Chilean production starred Lucas Sáez Collins (Jon), Anto Bosman (Susan), and Daniel Leyton (Michael). It premiered the 3 October of 2025 in the theatre of Centro Cultural Las Condes with 14 shows, receiving positive reviews by the public and critics.

2025 Switzerland

Produced by the team of You do You Theater Co. Directed by Tim Hupf and choreographed by Julia Wachtel, starring Oli Pont (Jon), Heather Cavalet Hsieh (Susan) and Robert Flitcroft (Michael). Performed at Theater STOK from September 18th - 21st, 2025.

2025-2026 the Netherlands

The Dutch production at Theater De Landing in Amstelveen premiered on December 18, 2025, and concluded on January 10, 2026. This production starred Milan van Waardenburg as Jon, Paul Morris as Micheal, and Lisa Walravens as Susan. It was performed in the round.

== Casts ==
Character	Off-Broadway	US tour	London	West End	Encores! Off-Center	Off-Broadway revival	Kennedy Center
Character	2001	2003	2005	2009	2014	2016	2024
Jon	Raúl Esparza	Christian Campbell	Neil Patrick Harris	Paul Keating	Lin-Manuel Miranda	Nick Blaemire	Brandon Uranowitz
Michael	Jerry Dixon	Wilson Cruz	Tee Jaye	Leon Lopez	Leslie Odom Jr.	George Salazar	Grey Henson
Susan	Amy Spanger	Nikki Snelson	Cassidy Janson	Julie Atherton	Karen Olivo	Ciara Renée	Denée Benton

== Film adaptation ==
A film adaptation of Tick, Tick... Boom!, directed by Lin-Manuel Miranda, was produced by Ron Howard, Brian Grazer and Julie Oh. The screenplay is written by Steven Levenson. The film was Miranda's feature-length directorial debut. It premiered at AFI Fest on November 10, 2021, followed by a limited theatrical release in the United States on November 12, 2021, before being released by Netflix on November 19, 2021. The film stars Andrew Garfield as Jon opposite Robin de Jesús, Alexandra Shipp, Vanessa Hudgens, and Joshua Henry.

== Awards and nominations ==
=== Original Off-Broadway production ===
Year	Award Ceremony	Category	Nominee	Result
2002	Outer Critics Circle Awards	Outstanding New Off-Broadway Musical		Won
2002	Drama Desk Awards	Outstanding Musical		Nominated
2002	Drama Desk Awards	Outstanding Book of a Musical	Jonathan Larson & David Auburn	Nominated
2002	Drama Desk Awards	Outstanding Music	Jonathan Larson	Nominated
2002	Drama Desk Awards	Outstanding Lyrics	Jonathan Larson	Nominated
2002	Drama Desk Awards	Outstanding Director of a Musical	Scott Schwartz	Nominated
2002	Drama Desk Awards	Outstanding Actor in a Musical	Raúl Esparza	Nominated
2002	Drama Desk Awards	Outstanding Featured Actor in a Musical	Jerry Dixon	Nominated
2002	Lucille Lortel Awards	Outstanding Musical		Nominated
2002	Obie Awards	Distinguished Performance by an Actor	Raúl Esparza	Won
