= Jonathan Larson Performing Arts Foundation =

Organization (1997–2008)

- Successor: American Theatre Wing's Jonathan Larson Grant
- Formation: 1996; 30 years ago
- Founder: Allan S. Larson
- Dissolved: September 17, 2008; 18 years ago
- Type: Nonprofit
- Purpose: Musical Theatre
- Location: New York, United States
- Executive Director: Nancy Kassak Diekmann
- Key people: Jonathan Burkhart; William Craver; Joseph R. Gagliano, Jr.; Allan S. Gordon; Jay S. Harris; Allan S. Larson; Julie Larson; Victoria Leacock; Kevin McCollum; Jesse L. Martin; Peter Parcher; Todd Robinson
- Website: jlpaf.org (former)

The Jonathan Larson Performing Arts Foundation was a foundation started in 1996 by the family and friends of Jonathan Larson, composer of the musical Rent. From 1997 to 2008, the foundation awarded grants to musical theatre composers, lyricists and book writers. Following the 2008 grants, the program was shifted to the American Theatre Wing, where it continues as the Jonathan Larson Grants.

== Notable events and activities ==
=== "Today 4 U" Benefit Concert (1997) ===
On March 3, 1997, the Jonathan Larson Performing Arts Foundation presented a benefit concert titled "Today 4 U". The event featured performers who had been involved in Jonathan Larson's various projects throughout his career. The concert showcased a selection of songs from Larson's wider catalogue, including material from his musicals tick, tick...BOOM!, early versions of Rent, Sacred Cows, Away We Go!, and his unproduced musical Superbia.

==== Setlist ====
The following songs were performed at the concert:

- "Johnny Can't Decide" – performed by Anthony Rapp
- "Therapy" – performed by Ben Stiller
- "See Her Smile" – performed by Fredi Walker
- "No More" – performed by Wilson Jermaine Heredia and Mark Setlock
- "Eden" – performed by Wilson Jermaine Heredia, Norbert Leo Butz, Mark Setlock, Darius de Haas, Shayna Steele, and Shelly Dickinson
- "Destination Sky" – performed by Byron Utley
- "Ever After" – performed by Marin Mazzie and Scott Burkell
- "Come To Your Senses" – performed by Marin Mazzie
- "Over It" – performed by Gilles Chiasson and Shelley Dickinson
- "Open Road" – performed by Jesse L. Martin
- "Pura Vida" – performed by Fredi Walker, Shelly Dickinson, Aiko Nakasone, and Shayna Steele
- "You Call My Name" - performed by Taye Diggs and Idina Menzel
- "Out of My Dreams" - performed by Daphne Rubin-Vega, Darius De Haas, and Shayna Steele
- "All For Now" - performed by Richie Havens
- "Louder Than Words" – performed by Anthony Rapp and Jesse L. Martin
- "I Won't Close My Eyes" – performed by Sarah Jessica Parker
- "Without You" - performed by Mary Chapin Carpenter
- "Love Heals" - performed by Gwen Stewart and the Original Broadway Cast of Rent
- "Why" – performed by Gilles Chiasson

=== Annual grant presentations (1997–2008) ===
From 1997 to 2008, the Foundation held annual events, often luncheons, to award its grants. These presentations consistently featured musical performances, often showcasing the work of past and current grant recipients. Over the years, established Broadway performers also participated in these ceremonies, performing works by grantees or paying tribute to Larson. For example, the 2002 ceremony included guest artists Raul Espárza, Molly Ringwald, and Daphne Rubin-Vega, and the 2003 event featured performances by Esparza, Herndon Lackey, and Alice Ripley. The 2005 luncheon was emceed by Jason Biggs and included performances by Jen Chapin, Julia Murney, Molly Ringwald, and Michael Winther, among others.

==== Performances of Larson's works ====
A significant feature of the first several annual presentations was the performance of Jonathan Larson's own compositions, sometimes drawing from his extensive archive of unpublished songs or material from his earlier, unproduced, or lesser-known musicals. These performances frequently involved artists who had a personal or professional history with Larson.

Known songs by Jonathan Larson performed at these events include:

===== 1997 =====
- "One Song Glory" - Performed by Daphne Rubin-Vega. (From Rent)
- "LCD Readout" – Performed by Roger Bart. (From Superbia)
- "Hosing the Furniture" – Performed by Diane Fratantoni. (From Sitting on the Edge of the Future)
- "All For Now" – Performed by Timothy Britten Parker. (An unpublished ballad)
- "Destination Sky" – Performed by Molly Ringwald. (From Away We Go!)

===== 1998 =====
- "See Her Smile" - Performed by Roger Bart. (From tick, tick... BOOM!)
- "Pale Blue Square" - Performed by Sara Knapp. (From Superbia)
- "Johnny Can't Decide" - Performed by Anthony Rapp. (From tick, tick... BOOM!)
- "Why" - Performed by Giles Chaisson. (From tick, tick... BOOM!)
- "I Won't Close My Eyes" – Performed by Marin Mazzie, with piano accompaniment by Tim Weil. (From Superbia)

===== 2001 =====
- "Valentine's Day" - Performed by Daphne Rubin-Vega, Molly Ringwald, and Raul Esparza. (From Prostate of the Union)

This list is incomplete and requires further sourced additions.

=== Rent 10th Anniversary Benefit Concert (April 2006) ===
On April 24, 2006, a significant benefit concert, "Rent 10", was held at the Nederlander Theatre to mark the 10th anniversary of Rent on Broadway. The event featured a reunion of the original Broadway cast, including Adam Pascal, Anthony Rapp, Taye Diggs, Idina Menzel, and Jesse L. Martin, among others. Proceeds from this one-night-only concert benefited the Jonathan Larson Performing Arts Foundation, Friends In Deed, and New York Theatre Workshop.

== Grant recipients ==
The following is a list of composers, lyricists, book writers, and nonprofit theatre companies that received funding through the Jonathan Larson grant while the Jonathan Larson Performing Arts Foundation was active.

=== 1997 ===
- 52nd Street Project Theatre

=== 1998 ===
- Paul Scott Goodman
- Jeffrey Lunden and Arthur Perlman
- Adirondack Theatre Festival
- Vineyard Theatre

=== 1999 ===
- Kirsten Childs
- Sam Davis
- Peter Foley
- Ricky Ian Gordon
- Steven Lutvak
- Musical Theatre Works
- San Diego Repertory Theatre for The Princess and the Black-Eyed Pea by Karole Foreman and Andrew Chukerman
- Seattle Childrens Theatre
- West Coast Ensemble Theatre for The Vanishing Point by Rob Hartmann, Scott Keys and Liv Cummins

=== 2000 ===
- Beth Blatt and Jenny Giering
- Chad Beguelin and Matt Sklar
- Scott Burkell and Paul Loesel
- David Kirshenbaum
- John Mercurio
- David Simpatico
- Adobe Theatre Company for A Fish Story by Erin Purcell, Gregory Jackson and Michael Garin
- American Music Center Musical Theatre Works for The Girl Most Likely to... by Zina Goldrich, Marcy Heisler, Denis Markell and Douglas Bernstein
- O'Neill Musical Theatre Conference

=== 2001 ===
- John Bucchino
- Mindi Dickstein and Daniel Messé
- Laurence O'Keefe
- Robert Reale and Willie Reale
- Scott Davenport Richards
- Amanda Yesnowitz
- Children's Theatre Company for The Snow Queen by Ruth Mackenzie
- Theatreworks/USA

=== 2002 ===
- Debra Barsha
- Peter Jones
- Julia Jordan
- Michael Korie
- Peter Mills
- Lark Theatre Company for Normal by Cheryl Stern, Tom Kochan and Yvonne Adrian
- Page 73 Productions
- Signature Theatre Company for The Unknown by Janet Allard, Jean Randich and Shane Rettig

=== 2003 ===
- Nell Benjamin
- John Didrichsen
- Jeffrey Stock
- Nathan Tysen and Chris Miller
- New Georges Theatre for Magic Kingdom by Jake-ann Jones and Bruce Purse
- Vineyard Theatre for Miracle Brothers by Kirsten Childs

=== 2004 ===
- Jim Bauer and Ruth Bauer
- Mark Campbell
- Amanda Green
- Cynthia Hopkins
- Gihieh Lee
- Raw Impressions Theatre
- Village Theatre for Feeling Electric (now Next to Normal) by Tom Kitt and Brian Yorkey

=== 2005 ===
- Neil Bartram
- Nathan Christensen and Scott Murphy
- Michael Cooper and Hyeyoung Kim
- Steven Lutvak
- Glenn Slater and Stephen Weiner
- Lark Play Development Center for Barnstormer by Doug Cohen and Cheryl Davis

=== 2006 ===
- Andrew Gerle and Eddie Sugarman
- Lance Horne
- Joseph Iconis
- Kait Kerrigan and Brian Lowdermilk
- Alison Loeb
- Brendan Milburn and Valerie Vigoda
- New York Shakespeare Festival for Passing Strange by Mark Stewart and Heidi Rodewald

=== 2007 ===
- Matt Gould
- Melissa Li and Abe Rybeck
- Robert Maddock
- J. Oconer Navarro
- Benj Pasek and Justin Paul
- Mike Pettry
- St. Ann's Warehouse for Must Don't Whip 'Um by Cynthia Hopkins

=== 2008 ===
- Gaby Alter
- Susan DiLallo
- Jordan Mann
- Jeff Thomson
- Joel New
- Jason Rhyne
- City Theatre for An Infinite Ache by Brendan Milburn and Valerie Vigoda
