= Johnny Baseball =

Musical

- The New Red Sox Musical
- Logo
- Music: Robert Reale
- Lyrics: Willie Reale
- Book: Richard Dresser
- Basis: The Boston Red Sox
- Productions: 2010 Cambridge

Johnny Baseball: The New Red Sox Musical is a musical with a book by Richard Dresser and a score by brothers Robert Reale and Willie Reale. The story involves circumstances relating to the Curse of the Bambino. The musical had a preview run in Massachusetts that began on May 14, 2010. The musical's world premiere was on June 2, 2010 at the Loeb Drama Center of the American Repertory Theater.

== Synopsis ==
Originally called Red Sox Nation, Johnny Baseball was conceived after the Red Sox's stunning collapse in the 2003 playoffs due to the "Curse", which is often cited as a reason for the failure of the Boston Red Sox baseball team to win the World Series in the 86-year period from 1918 until 2004.

The Curse is traced to the interactions of three people: the fictional Johnny O'Brien, a hard-luck right-hander on the 1919 Red Sox; his idol, Babe Ruth; and O'Brien's love interest, Daisy Wyatt, an African American blues singer. The show is told through flashbacks between the fourth game of the 2004 American League Championship Series and the fictional life of Johnny O'Brien. The musical ends with David Ortiz ending the Curse in 2004.

== Original production numbers ==
Source: CurtainUp, UMaine program

Act I

- Overture
- Eighty-Six Years
- Ballad of Johnny O'Brien
- All I Have to Do
- God Bless the Boston Red Sox
- Don't I Know You?
- Brotherhood of Bastards
- Rooters' Song (removed in Maine production)
- Maybe You're An Angel (replaced with "God Wouldn't Mind" in Maine production)
- Ballad of Johnny O'Brien (Reprise)
- Auto Strop Jingle (removed in Maine production)
- Daisy Darling Why (removed in Maine production)
- Do or Die (removed in Maine production)
- Johnny Baseball Has A Vision (new in Maine production)
- Color Me Blue
- As Long As There's a Chance

Act II

- Entr'acte
- Not Rivera
- One More Run
- Daisy's Letter
- Worcester Booster's Fight Song
- Circle in a Diamond
- Free Country (removed in Maine production)
- One More Run (Reprise)
- Mr. Yawkey Has a Vision
- All I Have to Do (Reprise)
- See You in the Big Leagues
- Errors
- The Game of Baseball

== Production history ==
The premiere production was staged at the American Repertory Theater in Cambridge, Massachusetts. The cast featured Colin Donnell as the fictional character Johnny O'Brien, Stephanie Umoh as the fictional character Daisy Wyatt, Burke Moses as Babe Ruth, Charl Brown as Tim, and Jeff Brooks as Tom Yawkey.

The creative team included direction by Diane Paulus, choreography by Peter Pucci, orchestrations by Wendy Bobbitt Cavett, costumes by Michael McDonald, sets by Scott Pask, and lighting by Donald Holder. This production played from June 2, 2010 to July 11, 2010. Johnny Baseball was part of the theater's America: Boom, Bust and Baseball festival.

It was next produced in August, 2012 by the University of Maine Summer Music Theatre Festival and Issaquah, Washington-based Village Theatre's Festival of New Musicals which featured a cast that included Jared Michael Brown as Johnny O’Brien, Claudine Mako as Daisy Wyatt, and Joshua Lincoln as their son Tim Wyatt.

After heavy rewrites, it was produced for the Williamstown Theatre Festival in Summer 2013.

== Awards and nominations ==
=== Elliot Norton Award ===
- Outstanding Director (Large Theater) (Diane Paulus) WINNER

=== Independent Reviewers of New England (IRNE) Awards ===
- Best Musical (A.R.T.) Nominated
- Best Director of a Musical (Diane Paulus) Nominated
- Best Supporting Actor Musical (Burke Moses) Nominated
- Best Actress Musical (Stephanie Umoh) Nominated
- Best Young Performer (Erik March) Nominated
