= Once Around the City =

2001 musical by Robert and Willie Reale

- Playbill for original production
- Music: Robert Reale
- Lyrics: Willie Reale
- Book: Willie Reale
- Productions: 2001 Off-Broadway

Once Around the City is a musical written by brothers Robert (music) and Willie Reale (book and lyrics). The musical is set in 1980s Manhattan, when hostile takeovers of properties was the norm.

== Synopsis ==
Living in her grandmothers place that is a homeless shelter now, Gwen refuses to sell it to a real estate tycoon. The vice president of the real estate company, David, tricks Gwen into signing her inheritance away for practically nothing, but he soon falls for her. The only problem is David is engaged to the boss' daughter Elizabeth.

== Production ==
The production opened at Second Stage Theatre on June 12, 2001, and closed on July 22 2001. The show was directed by co-artistic director Mark Linn-Baker, costume design Paul Tazewell, set design Adrianne Lobel, lighting design Donald Holder, design John Weston, choreography Jennifer Muller, and music direction Rick Fox.

The cast starred Harry Althaus (Nikki), Jane Bodle (Gwen), John Bowman (Ernie), Peter Jay Fernandez (Luis), Patrick Garner (John), Joe Grifasi (Mario), Michael Magee (David), Michael Mandell (Bill), Geoffrey Nauffts (Hank), William Parry (Charlie Brandebaine), Michael Potts (Rudy), Sandra Shipley (Mrs. Merken), Anna Stone (Phyllis and Eve), Anne Torsiglieri (Delores and Margaret), and Brandy Zarle (Elizabeth).
