= A Year with Frog and Toad =

A Year With Frog and Toad
- Music: Robert Reale
- Lyrics: Willie Reale
- Book: Willie Reale
- Basis: Frog and Toad children's stories by Arnold Lobel
- Productions: 2002 Minneapolis; 2002 Off-Broadway; 2003 Broadway; 2007 National Tour

A Year With Frog and Toad is a musical written by brothers Robert (music) and Willie Reale (book and lyrics), based on the Frog and Toad children's stories written and illustrated by Arnold Lobel. The musical follows the woodland adventures of two amphibious friends, a worrywart toad and a perky frog, with their assorted colorful hopping, crawling and flying companions, over the course of a year. The show broke new ground by bringing professional children's theatre to Broadway, sparking the interest of the age 3-to-10 set.

Arnold Lobel's daughter, Adrianne Lobel, commissioned a musical based on her father's characters. She also designed the set, based on her father's writings. Her husband, actor Mark Linn-Baker, adapted the stories into a theatrical script, and later played Toad in the musical's Broadway debut. The original production and subsequent Broadway production was directed by David Petrarca. The intimate, 5-actor piece is frequently played by community theatre companies.

== Productions ==
The musical was workshopped in 2000 at New York Stage and Film (at Vassar College) and first produced by the Children's Theatre Company, Minneapolis, premiering on August 23, 2002, and closing on November 2 of the same year. It was directed by David Petrarca and choreographed by Daniel Pelzig. It next opened in New York City off-Broadway at the New Victory Theater in November 2002, playing to good reviews and sold-out houses for several weeks.

A Year With Frog and Toad opened on Broadway at the Cort Theatre on April 13, 2003, but after the jump from a $30 off-Broadway ticket to a $90 Broadway ticket, the show closed on June 15, after 73 performances and 15 previews.

The musical played a return engagement at the Children's Theatre Company from November 16 through December 31, 2004.

== Characters and original Broadway cast ==
- Frog – Jay Goede
- Toad – Mark Linn-Baker
- Bird, Mouse, Squirrel, Young Frog, Mole – Jennifer Gambatese
- Bird, Turtle, Squirrel, Mother Frog, Mole – Danielle Ferland
- Bird, Snail, Lizard, Father Frog, Mole – Frank Vlastnik

== Synopsis ==
Act I

Frog and Toad are hibernating ("A Year With Frog and Toad"). The birds are ready for spring, as the sleeping friends sing about their friendship and the year ahead ("Spring"). The protagonists awaken, and Toad begins to plant a garden, impatient that his plants grow slowly. He yells at the seeds but then worries that they are afraid to grow ("Seeds"). He sings, dances and plays the tuba to encourage them, which seems to work.

The next day, Frog writes a letter to Toad, because Toad is sad that he never receives mail, and gives it to Snail to deliver ("The Letter"). They then go swimming in the pond, but Toad is embarrassed to be seen in his bathing suit, and he tries to slip unseen into the water ("Getta Load of Toad"). The animals, however, come to look at Toad in his suit, and eventually, freezing, he must come out, where everyone sees him in his bathing suit. Turtle proceeds to feed the fish in the pond ("Underwater Ballet").

Later on, Frog has left Toad a note that he has gone to the island on the lake to be alone, after embarrassing Toad in his bathing suit, and Toad worries that Frog is sad. He rides a log out to the island, bringing lunch for the two of them, but he falls off the log into the water. It turns out that Frog is in fact happy and simply wanted time alone to think ("Alone"). The two friends eat wet sandwiches without iced tea.

Snail continues on his quest to deliver the letter to Toad. ("The Letter (Reprise)")

Later on, at Toad's home, Toad is baking cookies. Frog and Toad, along with the Birds, go kooky eating cookies and wolf down the whole batch that were supposed to be for dessert ("Cookies").

Act II

Frog and Toad try to fly a kite with some difficulty, eventually succeeding despite heckling from the birds ("The Kite").

By the end of summer, leaves cover the ground and the Birds fly south for the winter ("A Year With Frog and Toad (Reprise)"). Each of the two friends intends to surprise the other by raking his yard ("He'll Never Know"), but the squirrels soon make a mess of the neat piles of leaves, so neither of the friends discovers the good deed that the other has done.

A few days pass as a storm comes, and Frog tells Toad a scary semi-autobiographical story about a young Frog, whose parents Mother Frog and Father Frog leave Young Frog to go find a way out of the woods. The story continues as the young Frog escapes from being eaten by a Large and Terrible Frog ("Shivers").

Now it is winter and the Moles come out to play ("Snow Ballet"). Snail continues to Toad's house to deliver the letter ("The Letter (Reprise)").

Frog and Toad decide to go sledding down a hill that frightens Toad ("Down The Hill"). Frog falls off the sled, which bears Toad on a dangerous and bumpy path. Toad, angry that Frog had supposedly made him sled down the steep hill on purpose, initially declares to dissolve their friendship. Snail finally arrives with the letter that Frog had sent to Toad months earlier. The letter tells how Frog is only happy when his friend Toad is happy. Toad forgives Frog, and Snail is proud to have delivered his first letter ("I'm Coming Out of My Shell").

Frog is late on Christmas Eve, and Toad is worried about all the bad things that might have happened to him ("Toad to the Rescue"). Finally, Frog arrives, delayed by wrapping Toad's present ("Merry Almost Christmas").

Frog and Toad are hibernating again in their respective beds. The Birds sing as spring approaches ("Finale").

== Musical numbers ==
Act I

- "A Year With Frog And Toad" — Birds, Frog, and Toad
- "Spring" — Frog, Toad, and Birds
- "Seeds" — Toad
- "The Letter" — Snail
- "Getta Loada Toad" — Toad, Frog, Turtle, Mouse, and Lizard
- "Underwater Ballet" — Orchestra, danced by Turtle
- "Alone" — Frog
- "The Letter (Reprise)" — Snail
- "Cookies" — Frog, Toad, and Birds

Act II

- "Entr'Acte"
- "The Kite" — Birds, Frog, Toad
- "A Year With Frog And Toad (Reprise)" — Birds
- "He'll Never Know" — Frog and Toad
- "Shivers" — Young Frog, Mother Frog, Father Frog, Toad, and Frog
- "Snow Ballet"† — Orchestra, danced by Moles
- "The Letter (Reprise)" — Snail
- "Down The Hill" — Frog, Toad, and Moles
- "I'm Coming Out of My Shell" — Snail
- "Toad to the Rescue" — Toad and Moles
- "Merry Almost Christmas" — Toad, Frog, and Moles
- "Finale" — Birds, Toad, Frog

Notes

† Not included on original Broadway cast recording

== Recording ==
The original Broadway cast recording was released on April 6, 2004 by PS Classics.

== Awards and nominations ==
=== Original Broadway production ===
Year	Award ceremony	Category	Nominee	Result
2003	Tony Awards	Best Musical		Nominated
2003	Tony Awards	Best Book of a Musical	Willie Reale	Nominated
2003	Tony Awards	Best Original Score	Robert Reale and Willie Reale	Nominated
