= Burke Moses =

American actor (born 1959)

- Born: Burke William Moses; December 10, 1959 (age 66); New York City, New York, U.S.
- Education: Boston University; Carnegie Mellon University (BFA)
- Occupation: Actor
- Years active: 1986–present
- Spouse: Paulette Moses (m. 1989)
- Children: 2

Burke William Moses (born December 10, 1959, New York City) is an American actor. His older brother is actor Mark Moses.

== Career ==
Moses attended Boston University and Carnegie Mellon University. He performed the role of "Joe" at the New York City Opera in The Most Happy Fella in 1991. He appeared in the musical 1776 at the Williamstown Theatre Festival in June to July 1991, and in the Off-Broadway Public Theater production of The Way of the World in May 1991.

Moses first appeared on Broadway as a replacement in the role of Sky Masterson in the 1992 revival of Guys and Dolls. He originated the role of Gaston in Disney's Beauty and the Beast in 1994 on Broadway, as well as in the Los Angeles and London West End productions. He succeeded Brian Stokes Mitchell in the roles of Fred Graham/Petruchio in the Broadway revival of Kiss Me, Kate in January 2001. He played Herakles in the 2004 production of Sondheim's The Frogs. He appeared as Adam in Seven Brides for Seven Brothers at Goodspeed Opera House in 2005.

Moses played El Gallo in the 2006 off-Broadway revival of the musical The Fantasticks. In 2003, he played the role of Captain von Trapp in the national tour of The Sound of Music. He reprised the role in 2008 with Mirvish Productions at the Princess of Wales Theatre in Toronto alongside the winner of the TV show How Do You Solve a Problem Like Maria?, Elicia MacKenzie.

In 2012, he starred in The Music Man (Harold Hill) with Kate Baldwin (Marian), at Arena Stage in Washington, D.C. He appeared as "The Grinch" in Dr. Seuss' How the Grinch Stole Christmas! at the Old Globe Theatre, San Diego, in November 2014.

In 2015, he starred in the Vineyard Theatre's Off-Broadway production of Gigantic, which premiered on December 3, 2015.

Moses appeared in several New York City Center Encores! staged concert versions of musicals: DuBarry Was a Lady (1996), Lil' Abner (1998), and The New Moon (2003).

He also appeared in the soap operas Loving, As the World Turns and One Life to Live as well as guest-starred on various television series, including The Nanny. He appeared in the NBC unaired test pilot as the original Gavin Stone for the sitcom Good Morning, Miami in 2002.

In 2014, Moses became the author of Stanislavski Never Wore Tap Shoes: Musical Theater Acting Craft, a book focusing on acting on the musical stage.

== Filmography ==
Year	Title	Role	Notes
1986–88	Loving	Curtis Alden #3	Daytime serial Unknown episodes
1986	Spenser: For Hire	Tony Ristelli	Episode: "Death by Design"
1986	Guiding Light	Briggs	Daytime serial 6 episodes
1989–91, 1994	As the World Turns	Sean Baxter	Daytime serial Unknown episodes
1992–94	One Life to Live	Bulge Hackman	Daytime serial 4 episodes
1995	Bump in the Night	Bumpsted (voice)	Episode: "Love Stinks/Love's Labor Bumped"
1995–96	The Client	Jackson Love	Recurring role 6 episodes
1995	The Nanny	Tony Tatorri	Episode: "An Offer She Can't Refuse"
1996	Caroline in the City	Marco	Episode: "Caroline and the Kid"
1996	Cybill	Henry	Episode: "Going Out with a Bang"
1996	Life's Work	Teddy Riley	Episode: "Girlfriends"
1996	3rd Rock from the Sun	Glenn	Episode: "World's Greatest Dick"
1997	Nick Freno: Licensed Teacher	Boyd Hale	Episode: "Party at Nick's Place"
1997	The Hotel Manor Inn	Brian Armour	Feature film
1998	Best Friends for Life	David McCord	Television film
1998	Living in Captivity	Director	Episode: "Boogie Heights"
1998	The Secret Lives of Men	Phil	Episode: "Dancing in the Dark"
1999	DiResta	Sgt. Webber	Episode: "Viagra Falls"
1999	Katie Joplin	Terry Joplin	Episode: "I'd Rather Be in Philadelphia"
2000	Ladies Man	Jay Roark	Episode: "Decent Proposal"
2000	Family Law	Lawyer	Episode: "Second Chance"
2000	Hollywood Off-Ramp	Guest Star	Episode: "TKO"
2000	The Hughleys	Nick Mitchell	Episode: "Design Flaws"
2001	Family Law	Lewis Wise	Episode: "Intentions"
2003	All My Children	Andrew Miller	Daytime serial Unknown episodes
2008	One Life to Live	Calvin Jenkins	Daytime serial Episode #1.10179
2010	30 Rock	Thomas	Episode: "Argus"
2011	White Collar	Leland Shelton	Episode: "Deadline"
2014	The Mysteries of Laura	Peter Chase	Episode: "The Mystery of the Dead Date"
2014	Boardwalk Empire	Mr. Jeffries	Episode: "King of Norway"
2015	The Good Wife	Sheriff John Colby	Episode: "Restraint"
2016	Chicago P.D.	Martin Ainge	Episode: "Kasual with a K"
2017	Elementary	New Jersey Detective	Episode: "Be My Guest"
2017	Younger	Lachlan Flynn	Recurring role 3 episodes
2018	Castle Rock	Local Color Host	Episode: "Local Color"

== Stage credits ==
Year	Title	Role	Venue	Ref.
1984	Show Boat	Sheriff Ike Vallon	New York Harlem Opera Company, Global Tour	
1991	1776	Richard Henry Lee	Regional, Williamstown Theatre Festival	
1992	Who's Afraid of Virginia Woolf?	Nick	Regional, Hartford Stage	
1993	Guys and Dolls	Sky Masterson	Broadway, Martin Beck Theatre	
1993	Beauty and the Beast	Gaston	Regional, Theatre Under the Stars	
1994	Beauty and the Beast	Gaston	Broadway, Palace Theatre	
1995	Beauty and the Beast	Gaston	Regional, Shubert Theatre	
1996	Du Barry Was a Lady	Performer	Off-Broadway. New York City Center Encores!	
1997	Beauty and the Beast	Gaston	West End, Dominion Theatre	
1998	Li'l Abner	Li'l Abner Yokum	Off-Broadway, New York City Center Encores!	
1998	Camelot	Lancelot du Lac	Regional, George Brown Theater	
2001	Kiss Me, Kate	Fred Graham / Petruchio	Broadway, Martin Beck Theatre	
2002	The Fantasticks	El Gallo	Regional, The Muny	
2003	The New Moon	Performer	Off-Broadway, New York City Center Encores!	
2003	The Sound of Music	Georg Von Trapp	Regional, Theatre Under the Stars	
2004	The Frogs	Herakles	Broadway, Lincoln Center Theater	
2005	Seven Brides for Seven Brothers	Adam Pontipee	Regional, Goodspeed Musicals	
2005	Beauty and the Beast	Beast	Regional, Fox Theatre	
2005	The Music Man	Harold Hill	Regional, Fox Theatre	
2007	The Fantasticks	El Gallo	Off-Broadway, Jerry Orbach Theatre	
2007	Guys and Dolls	Sky Masterson	Regional, American Musical Theatre of San Jose	
2008	The Sound of Music	Georg Von Trapp	West End, Princess of Wales Theatre	
2010	Johnny Baseball	Babe Ruth	Regional, American Repertory Theatre	
2010	Dirty Rotten Scoundrels	Lawrence Jameson	Regional, Wells Fargo Pavilion	
2010	The Sound of Music	Georg Von Trapp	Regional, Fox Theatre	
2011	Guys and Dolls	Sky Masterson	Regional, Riverside Theatre	
2011	City of Angels	Stone	Regional, Goodspeed Musicals	
2012	The Music Man	Harold Hill	Regional, Arena Stage	
2013	Thoroughly Modern Millie	Trevor Graydon III	Regional, Paper Mill Playhouse	
2013	Thoroughly Modern Millie	Trevor Graydon III	Regional, Ogunquit Playhouse	
2013	Johnny Baseball	Babe Ruth	Regional, Williamstown Theatre Festival	
2013	The Underpants	Frank Versati	Regional, Hartford Stage	
2014	The Unsinkable Molly Brown	J.J. Brown	Regional, Denver Center Theatre Company	
2014	Dr. Seuss' How the Grinch Stole Christmas!	The Grinch	Regional, Old Globe Theatre	
2015	Gigantic	Mike	Off-Broadway, Vineyard Theatre	
2017	42nd Street	Julian Marsh	Regional, North Shore Music Theatre	
2018	The Outsider	Arthur Vance	Regional, Paper Mill Playhouse	
2019	A Few Good Men	Lt. Col. Nathan Jessep	Regional, Pittsburgh Public Theatre	

== Video games ==
Year	Title	Role
2003	Manhunt	Skin
2008	Grand Theft Auto IV	The Crowd of Liberty City

== Awards and nominations ==
Year	Award	Category	Work	Result	Ref.
1994	Drama Desk Awards	Outstanding Featured Actor in a Musical	Beauty and the Beast	Nominated	
1994	Theatre World Award		Beauty and the Beast	Won	
