= Frank Vlastnik =

American actor and writer (born 1969)

- Born: May 30, 1969; Peru, Illinois
- Education: Illinois Wesleyan University

Frank Vlastnik (born May 30, 1969) is an American writer and actor known for his roles in several Broadway productions.

== Early life and education ==
Vlastnik was born in Peru, Illinois. He graduated from Illinois Wesleyan University in 1987.

== Career ==
=== Stage work ===
Vlastnik was an original cast member in the short-lived musicals Big, Sweet Smell of Success, and A Year with Frog and Toad on Broadway, and Off-Broadway in Stephen Sondheim's musical Saturday Night. His big break came when he was cast as the original understudy for the leading role in Big. He later starred on and off-Broadway in A Year with Frog and Toad in which he played the 'Snail with the Mail', and was featured on the cast album.

=== Television work ===
He has guest-starred on episodes of the television series Law & Order, The Good Wife, Boardwalk Empire, Person of Interest, and Elementary.

=== Writing ===
Vlastnik is the co-author of the books Broadway Musicals and Sitcoms, both published by Black Dog & Leventhal Publishers.

In 2021, Vlastnik co-authored The Art of Bob Mackie, about the life and career of American fashion designer and costumier Bob Mackie.

== Filmography ==
=== Film ===
| Year | Title | Role | Notes |
|---|---|---|---|
| 2010 | Random Unrelated Projects | Val / Ralph | |

=== Television ===
| Year | Title | Role | Notes |
|---|---|---|---|
| 1990 | The Image | Production Assistant | Television film |
| 1993 | The Adventures of Brisco County, Jr. | Telegraph Clerk | Episode: "Pilot" |
| 1999 | Law & Order | Dr. Phil Sugarman | Episode: "Disciple" |
| 2012 | Person of Interest | House Manager | Episode: "Til Death" |
| 2012 | Boardwalk Empire | —N/a | Episode: "Margate Sands" |
| 2013 | The Good Wife | Egert Hines | Episode: "Boom De Yah Da" |
| 2014 | In Fear Of | Kendall | Episode: "Agoraphobia: Fear of Leaving the House" |
| 2015 | Elementary | Handwriting Expert | Episode: "Absconded" |
| 2015 | Happyish | Audience Member #1 | Episode: "Starring Christopher Hitchens, Philip Larkin and Josef Stalin" |
