= Children's Theatre Company =

Regional theater in Minneapolis, Minnesota

Coordinates: 44°57′28″N 93°16′24″W

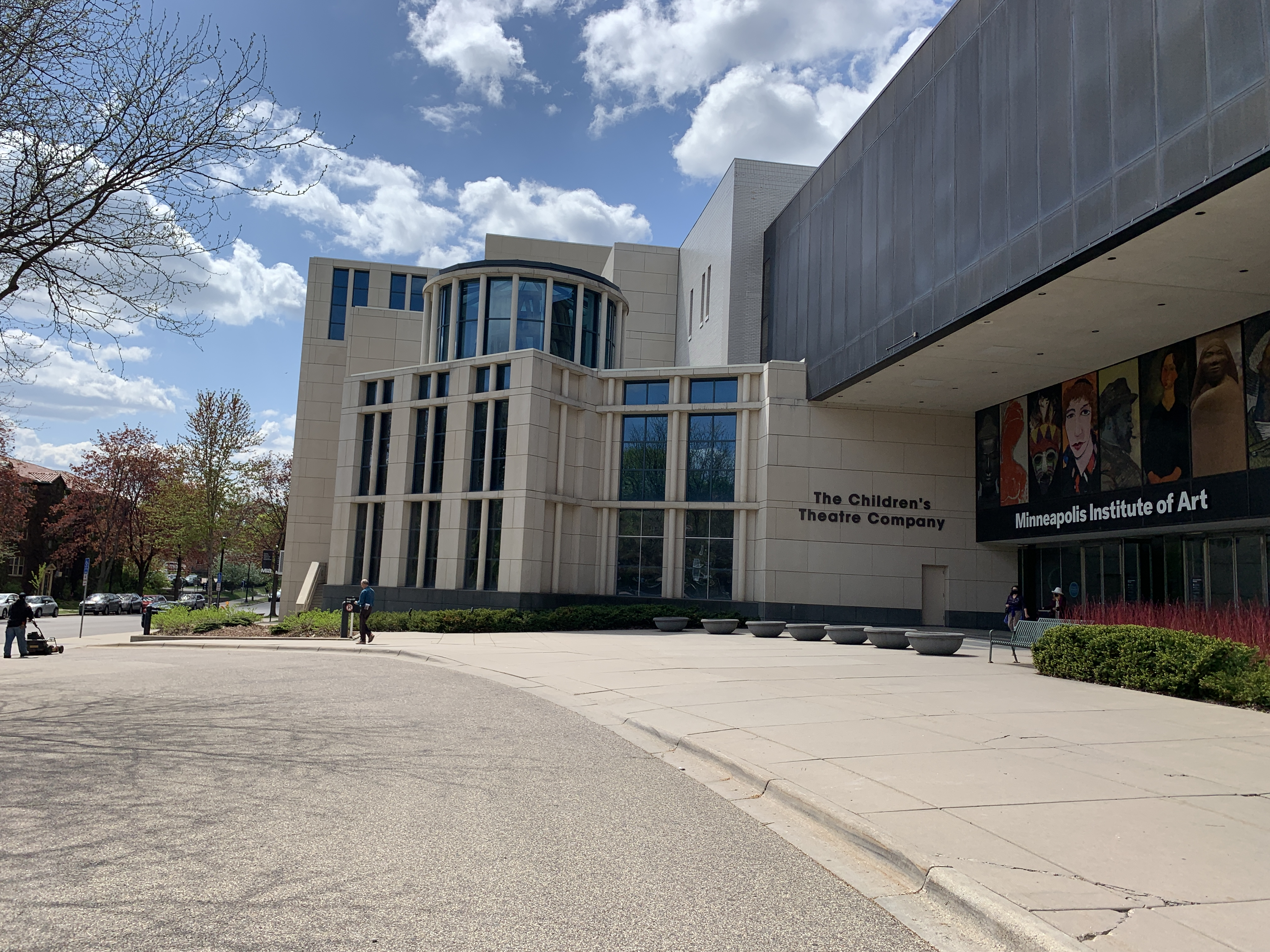
Exterior view

The Children's Theatre Company (CTC) is a regional theater established in 1965 in Minneapolis, Minnesota, specializing in plays for families, young audiences and the very young. The theater is the largest theater for multigenerational audiences in the United States and is the recipient of 2003 Tony Award for Outstanding Regional Theatre. The November 2, 2004, edition of Time magazine named the company as the top theater for children in the U.S.

Children’s Theatre Company operates two theatre spaces including the UnitedHealth Group Stage which seats 747 and the mixed-use Cargill Stage which seats up to 300. Architect Michael Graves designed the expansion for the theater in 2003, nearly doubling the production shops and adding the Cargill stage and lobby space.

== History ==
The founding is credited to John Clark Donahue and Beth Linnerson under the name The Moppet Players from 1961-1965. It became the education department of the Minneapolis Institute of Arts in 1965, ending in 1975 when it became an independent 501c(3) non-profit organization. Many productions are original adaptations commissioned by the theater from children's literature, including Pippi Longstocking, The 500 Hats of Bartholomew Cubbins, Cinderella, How the Grinch Stole Christmas!, A Year with Frog and Toad, Diary of a Wimpy Kid, and Alice in Wonderland, some of which have been in the company's repertoire for decades. Actors in productions are a mix of adult and young adult performers. Recent plays and musicals produced are written by leading playwrights that include wholly original stories and adaptations of books by popular authors such as Matt De La Peña, Jeff Kinney, J.R.R. Tolkien, Kate DiCamillo, and Jacqueline Woodson.

The programs began operating from space donated in a restaurant before moving to an abandoned fire station donated when the troupe affiliated itself with the social service agency Pillsbury-Waite Settlement House. It is now located next to the Minneapolis Institute of Arts.

Donahue was fired in 1984 after pleading guilty to sexual abuse of three male minor students. He was sentenced to a year in prison and 15 years' probation during which he was to completely disengage himself from Children's Theatre Company.

On December 1, 2015, two former students from the 1970s and early 80s filed civil lawsuits against the theater claiming abuse by Donahue and Jason McLean, a former actor. Additional suits were filed under the Minnesota Child Victims Act, which expired in May 2016. Donahue would later die from cancer in March 2019.

On November 1, 2019, Children's Theatre Company announced the settlement of all 16 lawsuits. Children's Theatre Company's board of directors also approved a contribution to a newly created Survivors Fund in the amount of $500,000 requested by the survivors.

== Leadership ==
The theater was founded by John Clark Donahue along with John Burton Davidson, Shirley Diercks, Martha Pierce Boesing and Beth Leinerson. Jon Cranny served as the theater's second artistic director from 1984 until 1997, when Peter C. Brosius became the theater's third artistic director alongside the theater's managing directors: Theresa Eyring (1999–2007), Gabriella Callichio (2007–11), Tim Jennings (2011–15), Kimberly Motes (16-24), Jill A. Anderson (24-25), and Ryan French (25-Present). Brosius was the longest serving Artistic Director in the history of Children’s Theatre Company. Rick Dildine was named the fourth Artistic Director in 2024.

== New Plays/Notable People ==
In 1998, under Brosius' leadership, the theater established a new play laboratory, which works with leading playwrights, composers, designers, and directors. Over 200 new plays have been developed and the majority have had their world premieres at Children’s Theatre Company.

The theater has partnered with other large theatre producers such as Kevin McCollum, Buena Vista Theatricals, Universal Theatrical Group, and other leading regional theaters such as The Old Globe Theatre, New Victory Theater, Alliance Theatre, Arena Stage, and others. The original production of A Year with Frog and Toad transferred to Broadway and was nominated for three Tony Awards. The theater's production of A Year with Frog and Toad completed a run at the Cort Theatre on Broadway in June 2003. The theater commissioned and developed the production Diary of a Wimpy Kid: the Musical together with Broadway producer Kevin McCollum and Buena Vista Theatrical and Jeff Kinney, author of the book series. It had its world premiere in 2016 and a subsequent production in 2022.

In 2021, Children’s Theatre Company, Penumbra (Saint Paul, MN), Ma-Yi Theater Company (New York City, NY), Latino Theater Company (Los Angeles, CA), and Native Voices at the Autry (Los Angeles, CA) announced a landmark partnership that received a $1.5 million grant from The Andrew W. Mellon Foundation to create Generation Now. The program will commission and develop 16 new plays by Black, Indigenous, Latinx, and Asian American Pacific Islander writers for multigenerational audiences. The output of Generation Now promises to “radically expand the inclusiveness of each theatre, expand the canon of work produced for multigenerational audiences, and create a model of transformative partnership for the theatre field.”

In 2023, the theater premiered a brand new musical version of An American Tail the Musical, based on the Universal Pictures/Amblin Entertainment animated film from 1986, with Universal Theatrical Group.

=== Plays for New Audiences ===
Plays for New Audiences (formerly Plays for Young Audiences) is the script licensing division of Children's Theatre Company that focuses on plays for multigenerational audiences and actors. PNA's catalog features plays and musicals produced, commissioned, and curated by theatres for young audiences including Seattle Children's Theatre, Chicago Children's Theatre, and Imagination Stage, along with pieces commissioned by Children's Theatre Company.

Plays for New Audiences began in July 2004 to provide scripts developed by Seattle Children's Theatre and the Children's Theatre Company to professional and amateur theatres, churches, libraries and schools.

=== Notable playwrights ===
- Greg Banks
- Kia Corthron
- Nilo Cruz
- Philip Dawkins
- Larissa Fasthorse
- Jerome Hairston
- Jeffrey Hatcher
- Naomi Iizuka
- Barry Kornhauser
- Kari Margolis
- Timothy Mason
- Itamar Moses
- Willie Reale
- Lloyd Suh
- Cheryl L. West

=== Notable composers ===
- Lamont Dozier
- Paris Ray Dozier
- Michael Mahler
- David Mallamud
- Steven Ryberg
- Alan Schmuckler
- Hiram Titus
- Victor Zupanc

=== Notable actors ===
- Francesca Curran
- Josh Hartnett
- Dean Holt
- Vincent Kartheiser
- Rajane Katurah
- Alix Kendall
- Ann Kim
- Mark Linn-Baker
- Ryan McCartan
- Autumn Ness
- Laura Osnes
- Adam Shankman
- Reed Sigmund
- Lea Thompson
