= Stephanie Umoh =

American stage actress (born 1986)

- Born: Stephanie Jean Umoh; January 9, 1986 (age 40); Lewisville, Texas, United States
- Education: Boston Conservatory (BFA)
- Occupation: Actress
- Years active: Since 2009

Stephanie Jean Umoh (born January 9, 1986) is an American stage actress.

She currently stars as Angelica Schuyler in Hamilton on Broadway. She played the role of Sarah in the 2009 Broadway theatre revival of the musical Ragtime which performed from November 15, 2009, to January 10, 2010.

== Early life, education and early career ==
Umoh was born in Lewisville, Texas, where she attended the Lewisville High School, graduating in 2004.

She then attended The Boston Conservatory in Boston, Massachusetts, where she received a Bachelor of Fine Arts in musical theatre. She studied with Merril Shea, a voice teacher, with her senior emphasis in acting.

While a student at conservatory Umoh appeared in productions of The Violet Hour (play), as Jesse; Into the Woods (musical), as Cinderella; and The Life (musical), as Queen. She also appeared as Serena in the workshop production of Lucky Duck directed by book and lyrics writer Bill Russell.

== Career ==
While still a student she appeared in U.S. regional-theater professional productions of Zanna, Don't! (musical), as Kate, and The Bubbly Black Girl Sheds Her Chameleon Skin, as Viveca (Bubbly), both at the Speakeasy Stage Company in Boston.

Umoh also appeared as Sarah in Ragtime at the New Repertory Theatre in Watertown, Massachusetts. For this performance she was nominated for an Elliot Norton Award and an IRNE Award. She would ultimately revive her role on Broadway.

She has appeared Off Broadway in the Roundabout Theatre Company's workshop production of The Tin Pan Alley Rag, as Freedie/Treemonisha. She has also participated in theatrical readings of Luck!, at the York Theatre, and Time After Time. She played Mona in Hunter Foster's theatrical adaption of the 1967 film Bonnie and Clyde at the Westside Theatre.

Her additional regional theater credits include Hair at the Connecticut Repertory Theatre and Johnny Baseball at the American Repertory Theater.
