= Mark Linn-Baker =

American actor (born 1954)

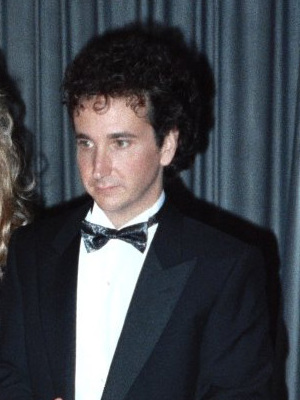
- Linn-Baker at the 39th Primetime Emmy Awards buffet in 1987
- Born: Mark Linn Baker; June 17, 1954 (age 72); St. Louis, Missouri, U.S.
- Education: Yale University (BA, MFA)
- Occupations: Actor; director
- Years active: 1978–present
- Spouses: Adrianne Lobel (m. 1995; div. 2009) Christa Justus (m. 2012)
- Children: 1

Mark Linn-Baker (born Mark Linn Baker; June 17, 1954) is an American actor and director who played Benjy Stone in the film My Favorite Year and Larry Appleton in the television sitcom Perfect Strangers.

== Early life and education ==
Mark Linn-Baker was born with the given names Mark Linn and the surname Baker in St. Louis, Missouri. He later changed his surname to a compound surname by hyphenating his middle name Linn with his surname Baker, producing Linn-Baker. His mother, Joan (née Sparks), of Jewish ancestry, was a dancer, and his father, William Nelson Baker, co-founded the Open Stage Theater in Hartford. His parents were both active in theatre and participated in civil rights activism. He graduated from Wethersfield High School in Wethersfield, Connecticut, in 1972, and from Yale University in 1976. He then attended the Yale School of Drama, receiving a MFA in Drama in 1979, and following that, found most of his early roles on stage.

== Career ==
He developed and performed in a two-man comedy show, The Laundry Hour, with Lewis Black, in the early 1980s.

He appeared in the 1983 Broadway version of the Doonesbury comic strip. He appeared in Laughter on the 23rd Floor in 1993; the 1996 revival of A Funny Thing Happened on the Way to the Forum; the 1998 Roundabout Theatre Company production of A Flea in Her Ear; the 2003 musical A Year with Frog and Toad; and the 2006 comedy Losing Louie.

His film debut was a small part in Woody Allen's 1979 film Manhattan. The majority of Linn-Baker's scenes were cut from the film. Three years later, he landed a far more memorable film role, playing Benjy Stone in the 1982 comedy film My Favorite Year alongside Peter O'Toole. In a manner similar to his future role in Perfect Strangers, Linn-Baker played the straight man to O'Toole's outrageous character, Alan Swann.

Having attained success on stage and the big screen, Linn-Baker began to turn his sights toward television. In 1983, he appeared in an unsold detective show pilot called O'Malley. The following year saw a role on the television movie The Ghost Writer, and in the summer series The Comedy Zone. Soon, Linn-Baker was appearing in several high-profile television shows. He guest-starred on a 1984 episode of Miami Vice as Bonzo Barry and portrayed hapless office worker Phil West on a 1985 episode of Moonlighting titled "Atlas Belched". Linn-Baker starred with Charles Kimbrough in the 1985 CBS pilot The Recovery Room, a sitcom about a bar located across from a major city hospital and its inhabitants. Airing as a special that summer, the pilot did not lead to a regular series. Between parts, Linn-Baker also appeared during this time in television commercials pitching products ranging from Kellogg's Nutri-Grain to Kraft's Life Savers.

Linn-Baker starred in the ABC series Perfect Strangers as Larry Appleton, a young man living on his own for the first time in Chicago. Larry's world was disrupted when a distant cousin from the (fictional) Mediterranean island of Mypos, Balki Bartokomous (Bronson Pinchot), showed up on his doorstep. Storylines revolved around Larry's attempts to show Balki the ways of American culture, although the neurotic Larry frequently proved to be just as naive as Balki. The series ran for eight seasons. Later, he appeared in Peter Bogdanovich's 1992 film Noises Off.

In 2005, he was a regular cast member on the WB Network sitcom Twins, which was canceled after a single season. He also appeared in the 2010 film How Do You Know as Ron. In 2011, he starred in his sixth Broadway show Relatively Speaking in a one-act play by Woody Allen. He previously appeared opposite Nathan Lane in A Funny Thing Happened on the Way to the Forum. In 2016 he appeared off-Broadway as Sir Peter Teazle in The School for Scandal at the Lucille Lortel Theatre. As of 2017 he is playing the role of Carlton Miller, aide to Mayor Margaret Dutton (Lorraine Bracco) on the CBS police procedural drama Blue Bloods.

In 2019, he played Mayor George Shinn in the Kennedy Center's production of The Music Man opposite Norm Lewis as Hill and Jessie Mueller as Marian. He reprised his role when he replaced Jefferson Mays in the 2022 Broadway revival, where he performed opposite Hugh Jackman as Hill and Sutton Foster as Marian.

=== Guest appearances ===
On a 1992 episode of Full House, Linn-Baker played Dick Donaldson, the wealthy, snobbish cousin of Becky Donaldson Katsopolis (Lori Loughlin). In 1997, he guest starred on Family Matters as the abusive boss of Harriette Winslow (Jo Marie Payton). Linn-Baker guested three times on Hangin' with Mr. Cooper as Larry Weeks. Additionally, he appeared on an episode of Law & Order as a strip club owner being extorted by the Mob. In a 1997 episode of Sesame Street, he had a guest role as a veterinarian examining a sick—and invisible—Barkley.

Linn-Baker also directed numerous episodes of Family Matters, Hangin' with Mr. Cooper, Step By Step and The Trouble with Larry. He appeared as a spokesperson for Peter Pan peanut butter in a series of commercials in the late 1980s and 1990s.

He also appeared in a Christmas episode of Ally McBeal as a man fired for seeing a unicorn.

On a 2003 episode of Law & Order: Criminal Intent, he guested as an insurance investigator named Wally Stevens who displays strong Asperger's Syndrome traits. He gets a degree of empathy from Det. Robert Goren and a number of behind-his-back snickers from Goren's partner Alexandra Eames. His character made a return cameo appearance in the season 6 episode "Endgame", where it was revealed Goren has kept in touch with the character through correspondence. In season 2, episode 14 ("Probability"), the last line spoken by Eames is "I'm sure he'd like a pen pal."

Linn-Baker provided the voice for one of a quartet of aardvarks in the 2002 Sandra Boynton album Philadelphia Chickens. The other three were voiced by Joe Grifasi, Michael Gross, and Devin McEwan.

He joined his friend, fellow Yale Drama School graduate and former sidekick Lewis Black, on the audiobook version of Black's second book Me of Little Faith where he and Black recreate The Laundry Hour, an act they did in New York City in the early 1980s. He guest-starred in several episodes of the children's TV show The Electric Company in February–March 2009 as "Uncle Sigmund Scrambler".

In 2009, he appeared in an episode of the American version of Life on Mars, playing a character who collected women's underwear that he later used for masturbation. In 2010, he appeared in an episode of Law & Order, "The Taxman Cometh", as Dr. Vincent Balicheck, a physician who used controversial therapies on cancer patients which resulted in their deaths.

Linn-Baker and Perfect Strangers are referenced in the HBO TV series The Leftovers, which takes place after a fictional global event called the Sudden Departure, the inexplicable, simultaneous disappearance of 140 million people, 2% of the world's population. Within the show, the entire cast of Perfect Strangers has departed, except for Linn-Baker, who has faked his own departure and escaped to Mexico. Linn-Baker appears, as a fictional version of himself, in the episodes "Axis Mundi" and "Don't Be Ridiculous".

In 2019, he appeared as Josh's father Dave in the Unbreakable Kimmy Schmidt episode "Kimmy is in a Love Square!" Also in 2019, he appeared in Season 6 (Episode 7) of The Blacklist as entomologist Dr. Jonathan Nikkila.

== Personal life ==
In 1995, Linn-Baker married Adrianne Lobel, the daughter of children's book author Arnold Lobel, best known for his Frog and Toad series. They divorced after having one daughter. Linn-Baker helped adapt his father-in-law's stories into the Tony-nominated Broadway musical A Year with Frog and Toad, in which Linn-Baker played Toad and Jay Goede played Frog. On December 29, 2012, Linn-Baker married actress Christa Justus.

== Filmography ==
=== Television ===
Year	Title	Role	Notes
1978	All's Well That Ends Well	Bertram	Television film
1982	Alice at the Palace	Various	Television film
1983	O'Malley	Public Defender	Television film
1984	American Playhouse	Nathan Zuckerman	1 episode
1984	Comedy Zone	Various	2 episodes
1985	Miami Vice	'Bonzo' Barry Gold	1 episode
1985	The Equalizer	Ronnie	Episode: "Bump and Run"
1985	Moonlighting	Phil West	1 episode
1986–1993	Perfect Strangers	Larry Appleton	Lead role; 150 episodes
1989	The Hogan Family	Stan Forrest	1 episode
1991	Bare Essentials	Gordon Perkins	Television film
1992	Ghostwriter	Police Officer	1 episode
1992	Full House	Dick Donaldson	1 episode
1993	The General Motors Playwrights Theater	The Student	1 episode
1994–1996	Hangin' with Mr. Cooper	Larry Weeks / Basketball Player with Glasses	3 episodes (1 uncredited)
1997	Spin City	Dr. Benjamin	1 episode
1997	Family Matters	Mr. Benner	1 episode
1997	Soul Man	Gumdrop	1 episode
1998	Ally McBeal	Sheldon Maxwell	1 episode
1999, 2010	Law & Order	Dr. Vincent Balicheck / Tom Wilder	2 episodes
2001	Laughter on the 23rd Floor	Val Skotsky	Television film
2003, 2007	Law & Order: Criminal Intent	Wally Stevens	2 episodes
2005–2006	Twins	Alan Arnold	18 episodes
2009	Life on Mars	Lincoln Hart	1 episode
2009–2010	The Electric Company	Sigmund Scrambler	4 episodes
2012	The Good Wife	Judge Don Linden	1 episode
2015, 2017	The Leftovers	Himself	2 episodes
2016	Red Oaks	Rabbi Ken	4 episodes
2017	The Good Fight	Judge Don Linden	1 episode
2017–2018	Blue Bloods	Carlton Miller	9 episodes
2019	Unbreakable Kimmy Schmidt	Dave Hoffman	1 episode
2019	The Blacklist	Dr. Jonathan Nikkila	1 episode
2019–2023	Succession	Maxim Pierce	4 episodes
2020	Law & Order: Special Victims Unit	Dr. Paul Capezio	1 episode
2021	Younger	Clive Wexler	1 episode
2021–present	Ghosts	Henry Farnsby	6 episodes
2022	She-Hulk: Attorney at Law	Morris Walters	Disney+ series; 4 episodes
2026	Chicago Med	Dr. Howie Mankiewicz	NBC series; 3 episodes
2026	Elsbeth	Barney Corman	season 3 episode 16 "Murder, He Wrote"

=== Film ===
Year	Title	Role	Notes
1979	Manhattan	Shakespearean Actor	Scenes deleted
1981	The End of August	Victor LeBrum	
1982	My Favorite Year	Benjy Stone	
1988	Me and Him	Him	
1988	Going to the Chapel	Norman Brinkmann	
1992	Noises Off	Tim Allgood	
2005	12 and Holding	Mr. Farmer	
2009	Adam	Sam Klieber	
2010	How Do You Know	Ron	
2018	Accommodations	Eugene Beltzer	
TBA	Weekend Warriors	TBA	Post-production

== Stage ==
=== As actor ===
Year	Title	Role(s)	Venue	Notes	Ref.
1978	Sganarelle: An Evening of Molière Farces	In The Flying Doctor: Sganarelle In The Forced Marriage: Marphurius, understudy Alcidas; In Sganarelle: Valère, understudy Sganarelle	Yale Repertory Theatre		
1978	All's Well That Ends Well	Bertram	New York Shakespeare Festival		
1979	Othello	Othello's orderly	New York Shakespeare Festival		
1980	Alice in Concert	performer	The Public Theater		
1981	The Laundry Hour	performer	The Public Theater		
1982	Maybe I'm Doing It Wrong	performer	Astor Place Theater		
1982	The Death of von Richthofen as Witnessed From Earth	William Evans	The Public Theater		
1982	Waiting for Godot	Vladimir	American Repertory Theater		
1983	Doonesbury	Mark	Biltmore Theater	Broadway debut	
1984	The Miss Firecracker Contest	Delmount Williams	Manhattan Theater Club		
1990	Signature	Maxwell T-Thorp	New York Stage and Film		
1993	Face Value	Bernard Sugarman	Cort Theatre		
1993	Laughter on the 23rd Floor	Val	Richard Rodgers Theater		
1996	A Funny Thing Happened on the Way to the Forum	Hysterium	St. James Theater		
1998	A Flea in Her Ear	Victor Chandebise, Dodo	Laura Pels Theater		
1999	As You Like It	Touchstone	Williamstown Theatre Festival		
1999	Chesapeake	Kerr	Second Stage Theater	Drama Desk Award nomination	
2002	The Pajama Game	Hines	New York City Center		
2002	A Year with Frog and Toad	Toad	Children's Theatre Company		
2003	A Year with Frog and Toad	Toad	Cort Theater		
2006	Losing Louie	Tony	Biltmore Theater		
2007	Romantic Poetry	Jilly Brilla, Carl	Wartel Theater		
2008	Almost an Evening	In Waiting: McMartin In Debate: God Who Loves	Atlantic Stage 2		
2008	Romantic Poetry	Carl	New York City Center		
2011	One Slight Hitch	Doc Coleman	Williamstown Theatre Festival		
2011	Relatively Speaking	In Honeymoon Motel: Sam Roth	Brooks Atkinson Theater		
2012	One Slight Hitch	Doc	George Street Playhouse		
2014	You Can't Take It With You	Paul Sycamore	Longacre Theater		
2015	On the Twentieth Century	Oliver Webb	American Airlines Theatre		
2016	The School for Scandal	Sir Peter Teazle	Lucille Lortel Theatre		
2016	The Music Man	Mayor Shinn	The Muny		
2017	A Funny Thing Happened on the Way to the Forum	Senex	The Muny		
2018	Good For Otto	Timothy	Signature Theatre Company		
2019	The Music Man	Mayor Shinn	Kennedy Center		
2019	Fern Hill	Billy	59E59 Theaters		
2022	The Music Man	Mayor Shinn	Winter Garden Theatre		
2025	The Imaginary Invalid	Argan	New World Stages		

=== As director ===
Year	Title	Venue	Notes	Ref.
1985	Savage in Limbo	47th Street Theater		
1986	L.A. Freewheeling	Hartley House Theatre		
1988	Zero Positive	The Public Theater	direction by Kenneth Elliott, original direction by Mark Linn-Baker	
1994-1996	Hangin' With Mr. Cooper	ABC		
1998	Black Humor	Cherry Lane Theatre		
2001	Once Around the City	Second Stage Theater		

=== As author ===
- The Laundry Hour (1981) - co-authored with Lewis Black, William Peters and Paul Schierhorn

== Audiobooks ==
- Arthur's Mystery Envelope
