= Danielle Ferland =

American actress and singer

- Born: January 31, 1971 (age 55); Derby, Connecticut
- Education: New York University
- Occupations: Actress, singer
- Known for: Into the Woods
- Spouse: Michael Goldstein (m. ca. 2002)
- Children: 2

Danielle Ferland (born January 31, 1971) is an American actress and singer, best known for originating the role of Little Red Ridinghood in Stephen Sondheim's Into the Woods on Broadway.

== Career ==
Ferland attended Frank Scott Bunnell High School in Stratford, Connecticut, from 1985–1989 and attended New York University.

She made her Broadway debut at age 13 as Louise in Stephen Sondheim's Sunday in the Park with George (1984). She next appeared off-Broadway in Paradise! (1985). In 1987 she was the singing child star in Woody Allen's Radio Days.

She returned to Broadway, originating the role of Little Red Riding Hood in the 1987 musical Into the Woods. For her performance in Into the Woods she received the 1988 Theatre World Award and also was nominated for the 1988 Drama Desk Award, Outstanding Featured Actress in a Musical. She reunited with the original cast for three performances in 1989, which were filmed for the Season 10 premiere episode of PBS’s American Playhouse.

Other credits include The Crucible (1991), Fredrika in A Little Night Music Lincoln Center Revival in 1991, Uncommon Women and Others (1994), Tartuffe at the Delacorte Theatre in 1999, A Year with Frog and Toad (2003), Engaged (2004), She Stoops to Conquer at the Irish Repertory Company in 2005, the concert and recording of the York Theatre production of Summer of '42 (2006), Like Love, New York Music Festival, 2007 and All My Sons (2008).

She teaches Master Classes including in 2009 at the Boston Children's Theatre.

Ferland narrated an audio book version of ''A Mile In My Flip-Flops'' written by Melody Carlson.

Since 2010, she has often performed in Sondheim Unplugged. She has sung for each of their three volumes, singing “Children and Art” in the second volume, “Hello Little Girl” in the first, and “It Takes Two” in the third. “Sondheim Unplugged NYC Sessions Volume 3” was nominated for a Grammy for the 2024 ceremony.

In 2011 she directed A Year with Frog and Toad with Boston Children's Theatre.

In 2012 Ferland starred in the Baltimore CenterStage and Westport Country Playhouse production of Into the Woods as the Baker's Wife.

In 2014 Ferland played the role of Estelle in HBO's drama The Normal Heart.

In 2015 Ferland appeared in Season 1 of the Netflix show Marvel's Jessica Jones.

In 2021, she appeared in Lin-Manuel Miranda’s film adaptation of Jonathan Larson’s Tick, Tick… Boom!.

== Personal life ==
Ferland was born in Derby, Connecticut. She married Michael Goldstein ca. 2002; they have two sons.

== Acting credits ==
=== Theatre ===
Year	Production	Role	Location	Category
1983	Sunday in the Park with George	Boy bathing in the River, Louise	Playwrights Horizons	Off-Broadway
1984-1985	Sunday in the Park with George	Boy bathing in the River, Louise	Booth Theatre	Broadway
1987-1989	Into the Woods	Little Red Ridinghood	Martin Beck Theatre	Broadway
1990	A Little Night Music	Fredrika Armfeldt	David H. Koch Theater	New York City Opera
1991-1992	The Crucible	Mercy Lewis	Belasco Theatre	Broadway
1992	A Little Hotel on the Side	Pervenche	Belasco Theatre	Broadway
1994	Sunday in the Park with George	Louise	St. James Theatre	Broadway
1997	The Wizard of Oz	Dorothy Gale	Actors Theatre of Louisville	Regional
1997	Into the Woods	Little Red Ridinghood	Broadway Theatre	Broadway
1999	The Secret Garden	Martha	North Shore Music Theatre	Regional
2003	A Year With Frog and Toad	Bird, Turtle, Squirrel, Mother Frog, Mole	Cort Theatre	Broadway
2008-2009	All My Sons	Lydia Lubey	Gerald Schoenfeld Theatre	Broadway
2012	Into the Woods	The Baker’s Wife	Westport Country Playhouse / Baltimore Center Stage	Regional, 25th Anniversary Production

=== Filmography ===
Year	Production	Role	Notes
1990	Live from Lincoln Center	Fredrika Armfeldt	Episode: A Little Night Music
1991	American Playhouse	Little Red Ridinghood	Episode: Into the Woods
1995	Mighty Aphrodite	Cassandra	Film
2002	The Education of Max Bickford	Marnie Ludlow	1 episode
2007	Rescue Me	Confessional Woman	1 episode
2013	Law & Order: Special Victims Unit	Tori	1 episode
2014	The Normal Heart	Estelle	TV film
2015	Marvel's Jessica Jones	Clair	4 episodes
2016	The OA	Hospital Admin	1 episode
2017	Wonder Wheel	Party Guest	Film
2019	Orange Is the New Black	Sharon	2 episodes
2019	Blue Bloods	Colleen Becker	1 episode
2021	tick, tick... BOOM!	Kim	Film
2022	Alaska Daily	Rita	1 episode

== Awards and nominations ==
Year	Award ceremony	Category	Show	Result
1988	Drama Desk Award	Outstanding Featured Actress in a Musical	Into the Woods	Nominated
1988	Theatre World Award	Distinguished Performance	Into the Woods	Honoree
