= Michael Potts (actor) =

American actor (born 1962)

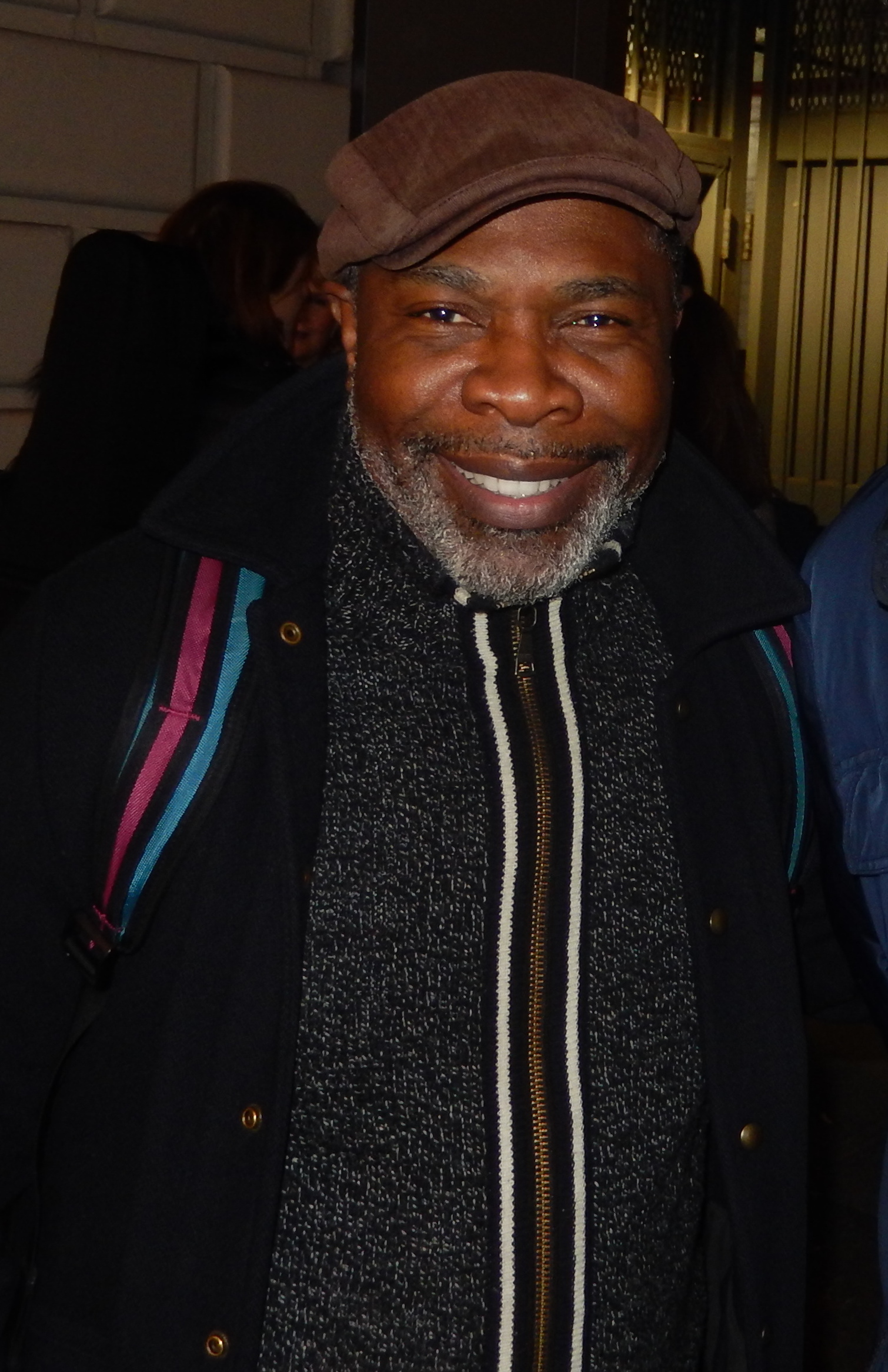
- Potts in 2018
- Born: September 21, 1962 (age 64); New York City, U.S.
- Education: Yale School of Drama
- Occupation: Actor
- Years active: 1990–present
- Known for: Brother Mouzone in The Wire; Mafala Hatimbi in The Book of Mormon

Michael Potts (born September 21, 1962) is an American actor. He has appeared on stage, on television and in motion pictures.

== Early years ==
Potts, who is of African American heritage, was born on September 21, 1962 in Brooklyn, New York City and grew up in South Carolina. He got his start participating in church and local plays. His inspiration to attend the School of Drama at Yale University came from watching a clip of the 1985 production of August Wilson's play Fences, starring James Earl Jones and Courtney B. Vance.

== Acting career ==
Potts is best known for playing the roles of Brother Mouzone in the HBO hit show The Wire, Mafala Hatimbi in the musical The Book of Mormon, and Slow Drag in Ma Rainey's Black Bottom. He also played Detective Gilbough in the first season of True Detective.

Potts appeared in the 2022 Broadway revival of The Piano Lesson, in a performance which The Hollywood Reporter called one of the highlights of the production.

Potts has appeared on the NBC crime series Law & Order several times, most recently in 2025.

From January 23 to February 8, 2026, Potts played the title role in the play King Lear at the Ellen Stewart Theater. Other cast members included Tony Torn, in a work directed by Karin Coonrod with collaborators Frank London and Oana Botez.

== Filmography ==
Key
†	Denotes works that have not yet been released

=== Film ===
Year	Name	Role	Notes
1990	Halloween Night	Bill	Also known as The Damning, DeathMask, and Hack-o-Lantern
1995	Hackers	Tow Truck Driver	
1997	The Peacemaker	DOE Haz-mat Tech #1	
1997	Conspiracy Theory	Justice Guard	
2000	Black People Hate Me and They Hate My Glasses		Short film
2006	Diggers	South Shell Pot Buyer	
2008	Jocasta	Oedipus	
2013	Mom	Andy	
2016	37	Archibald Smith	
2017	Let Me Make You a Martyr	Charon	
2018	Here and Now	Ray	
2018	Change in the Air	Professor Hoffman	
2020	Cicada	Francis	
2020	Ma Rainey's Black Bottom	Slow Drag	
2022	Measure of Revenge	Detective Eaton	
2022	Rounding	Dr. Emil Harrison	
2023	Rustin	Cleveland Robinson	
2024	The Piano Lesson	Wining Boy	
2025	Highest 2 Lowest	Patrick Bethea	
2025	Out of Order	Jerry	

=== Television ===
Year	Name	Role	Notes
1996	The West	Voice	TV miniseries
1996	NYPD Blue	Mel	Episode: "Yes, We Have No Cannolis"
1997	Thomas Jefferson	Isaac (voice)	TV special
1997–2010, 2025	Law & Order	Reggie Dobbs / Lester Wilkes / Malcolm Young / Stokes's Attorney / Defense Attorney Kenneth Lowell	5 episodes
1998	Trinity	Detective Jackson	Episode: "No Secrets"
1999	Cosby	Floyd	Episode: "The Wedding"
2001	Oz	Reinhardt	Episode: "Medium Rare"
2003–2004	The Wire	Brother Mouzone	7 episodes
2004	The Jury	Dr. Bertand	Episode: "Three Boys and a Gun"
2009	Flight of the Conchords	Nigel Saladu	Episode: "New Cup"
2009	Bored to Death	Yusef	Episode: "The Alanon Case"
2010	Damages	Horatio Emanuel	3 episodes
2012	Royal Pains	Mr. Burman	Episode: "After the Fireworks"
2012–2016	Law & Order: Special Victims Unit	IAB Sergeant Cole Draper	6 episodes
2013	Nurse Jackie	Mediator	2 episodes
2014	Blue Bloods	Thorton Mead	Episode: "Manhattan Queens"
2014	True Detective	Detective Maynard Gilbough	8 episodes
2014	Matador	Moktar Zola	Episode: "Code Red Card"
2014	White Collar	David	Episode: "Return to Sender"
2015	Allegiance	Unknown	2 episodes
2015	Gotham	Sid Bunderslaw	3 episodes
2015	Show Me a Hero	Walt Henderson	5 episodes
2015–2016	Person of Interest	Travers	2 episodes
2016	BrainDead	Dr. Daudier	Episode: "The Insanity Principle: How Extremism in Politics; Is Threatening Democracy in the 21st Century"
2016	Madam Secretary	Senator Fred Reynolds	3 episodes
2017	The Blacklist	Iniko	Episode: "The Forecaster (No. 163)"
2018	Taken	Hanson	Episode: "Password"
2018	Elementary	Doctor Peter Hanson	Episode: "Pushing Buttons"
2018	Random Acts of Flyness	Director	Episode: "What are your thoughts on raising free black children?"
2019	She's Gotta Have It	Joseph Petiport	Episode: "#NationTime"
2020	Lincoln Rhyme: Hunt for the Bone Collector	Dr. Arthur Wasden	Episode: "What Lies Beneath"
2020	God Friended Me	King Omari	Episode: "The Princess and the Hacker"
2021	Prodigal Son	Dr. Brandon Marsh	2 episodes
2022	Bull	Judge Nolan	Episode: "The Other Shoe"
2022	The First Lady	Fraser C. Robinson III	6 episodes
2022	The Good Fight	Bill Goate	Episode: "The End of Football"
2022–2023	East New York	Goody Gaines	4 episodes
2023	FBI	Agent Bruce Ellis	Episode: "Imminent Threat: Part Two"
2025	The Irrational	Nnamdi Adesina	Episode: "Another Man's Treasure"
2026	Best Medicine	Gilbert Carlisle	5 episodes
2026	Nemesis	James Sealey	8 episodes

=== Video games ===
Year	Name	Role	Notes
2005	The Warriors	Cyrus	Voice

=== Theatre credits ===
Year	Production	Role	Category	Theatre	Notes
1994	The America Play	Brazil	Off-Broadway	Public Theater	
1994	Rent	Benjamin Coffin III	Off-Broadway	New York Theatre Workshop	Workshop
1996	Overtime	Gratiano	Off-Broadway	Manhattan Theatre Club	
1997	Mud, River, Stone	David Bradley	Off-Broadway	Playwrights Horizons Theatre	
1998	The Rivals	Sir Lucius O'Trigger	Regional	Williamstown Theatre Festival	
1999	A Cup of Coffee	Julius Snaith	Regional	Yale Repertory Theatre	
2000	Arms and the Man	Nicola	Off-Broadway	Gramercy Theatre	
2000	Joe Fearless (A Fan Dance)	Ray and Doctor	Off-Broadway	Atlantic Theatre	
2000	Brooklyn Bridge		Off-Broadway	National Arts Club	Staged reading
2001	Romeo and Juliet	Benvolio	Los Angeles	Ahmanson Theatre	
2001	Once Around the City	Rudy	Off-Broadway	Second Stage Theatre	
2002	Twelfth Night	Feste	Off-Broadway	Delacorte Theatre	
2003	Highway Ulysses	Ensemble	Regional	American Repertory Theatre	
2005	Lennon	Ensemble	Broadway	Broadhurst Theatre	
2006–2007	Grey Gardens	Brooks Sr./Brooks Jr.	Broadway	Walter Kerr Theatre	
2007	Richard III	Buckingham	Off-Broadway	Classic Stage Company	
2008	The Tempest	Alonso	Off-Broadway	Classic Stage Company	
2011–2013	The Book of Mormon	Mafala Hatimbi	Broadway	Eugene O'Neill Theatre	
2016	Cabin in the Sky	Little Joe Jackson	Off-Broadway	City Center Theatre	
2017	Jitney	Turnbo	Broadway	Samuel J. Friedman Theatre	
2017	1984	Charrington	Broadway	Hudson Theatre	
2018–2019	The Prom	Mr. Hawkins	Broadway	Longacre Theatre	
2022–2023	The Piano Lesson	Wining Boy	Broadway	Ethel Barrymore Theatre	
2026	King Lear	King Lear	Regional	La MaMa Experimental Theatre Club	
2026	Windfall	Henri "Mr. Mano" Tamaño	Regional	Steppenwolf Theatre Company	
