= The Hotel Manor Inn =

- Directed by: Wayne Chesler
- Written by: Wayne Chesler
- Produced by: Wayne Chesler
- Starring: John Randolph; Sam Trammell; Burke Moses; Jennifer Corby
- Cinematography: Michael McCurry
- Edited by: Wayne Chesler; Michael McCurry
- Music by: Alan Schwartz
- Production company: Manor Films
- Distributed by: 50th Street Films
- Release date: March 28, 1997 (Quad Cinema)
- Running time: 92 minutes
- Country: United States
- Language: English

The Hotel Manor Inn is a 1997 American film written and directed by Wayne Chesler and starring John Randolph, Sam Trammell, Burke Moses and Jennifer Corby.

== Cast ==
- John Randolph as Gus
- Sam Trammell as Nolan
- Burke Moses as Brian Armor
- Jennifer Corby as Kathy
- Fred Norris as Pete
- Richard Bright as Gregor
- William Preston as Charlie
- Jessica Dublin as Lucille
- Lawrence Vincent as Ed
- Herschel Sparber as Chief Farrell
- Jack William Scott
- Jane Strauss as Holly Wiley
- Steve Roberts

== Release ==
The film was released at the Quad Cinema on March 28, 1997. It was also among the films that screened at the inaugural Long Island International Film Expo.

== Reception ==
Stephen Holden of The New York Times gave the film a negative review and wrote, "This hopelessly flat, unfunny spoof of tabloid television and hotel management doesn't even generate a tingle."

Lisa Nesselson of Variety gave the film a positive review and wrote, "Creepy and offbeat enough to sustain interest without devolving into gratuitous violence or gore, this low-key horror pic is at least as suspenseful as the remake of Diabolique, although the body count is higher."
