= John Randolph (actor) =

American actor (1915–2004)

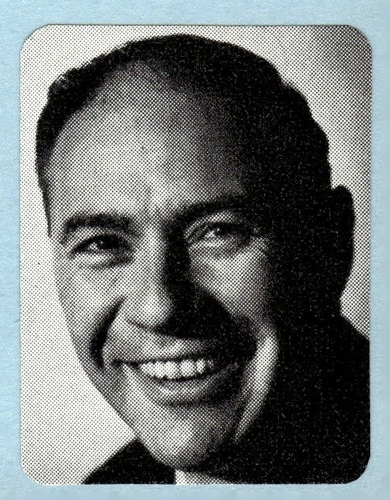
- Publicity photo
- Born: Emanuel Hirsch Cohen; June 1, 1915; New York City, U.S.
- Died: February 24, 2004 (aged 88); Los Angeles, California, U.S.
- Occupation: Actor
- Years active: 1938–2003
- Spouse: Sarah Cunningham (m. 1942; died 1986)
- Children: 2

Emanuel Hirsch Cohen (June 1, 1915 – February 24, 2004), better known by the stage name John Randolph, was an American film, television and stage actor.

== Early life ==
Randolph was born Emanuel Hirsch Cohen in New York City on June 1, 1915, the son of Jewish immigrants from Russia and Romania. His mother, Dorothy (née Shorr), was an insurance agent, and his father, Louis Cohen, was a hat manufacturer. In the 1930s, he spent his summers at the Pine Brook Country Club in Nichols, Connecticut, which was the summer home of the Group Theatre. He made his Broadway debut in 1938 in Coriolanus. Randolph joined the United States Army Air Forces in World War II. He had a small role in the 1948 film The Naked City.

He and wife Sarah Cunningham were blacklisted from working in Hollywood films and in New York film and television and radio after 1948. In 1955, they were both called before the House Un-American Activities Committee to testify concerning ongoing investigations regarding Communist infiltration in the American entertainment industry. Both he and his wife refused to answer questions and cited the Fifth Amendment protection against testifying against themselves.

== Career ==
Randolph was one of the last blacklisted actors to regain employment in Hollywood films when director John Frankenheimer cast him in a major leading role in the thriller Seconds in 1966. Randolph was in the original New York stage productions of The Sound of Music (as Von Trapp's butler, Franz), Paint Your Wagon, and The Visit.

In 1987, Randolph won both a Tony Award and a Drama Desk Award for his starring turn in Broadway Bound.

He made his last Broadway appearance in 1991 in a production of Prelude to a Kiss.

=== Film and television ===
Randolph made numerous screen and television appearances in secondary roles. He played Chief Sidney Green in Serpico (1973), directed by Sidney Lumet. From 1973 to 1976, he made three appearances as Cornelius "Junior" Harrison, Jr., father of Emily Hartley, in The Bob Newhart Show (shows #37, #59, and #106).

In 1974, he played an Air Force Colonel in the Columbo episode "Swan Song". He played a mayor in Earthquake (1974), a disaster film. In 1975, Randolph was cast as General Philip Blankenship in The New Original Wonder Woman pilot. He was replaced by Richard Eastham in the television series.

In 1975, Randolph took over the role of the principal of fictional Harry S. Truman High School in the series Lucas Tanner starring David Hartman. He was with the series for the last half of its single season. He had an uncredited role in the 1976 film All the President's Men as the voice of Richard Nixon's Attorney General John Mitchell.

He played Judge J. Waties Waring in "With All Deliberate Speed", a 1976 episode of CBS's mini-series The American Parade, dealing with events culminating in the 1954 Supreme Court decision (Brown v. Board of Education) barring racial segregation in American public schools.

In 1979, Randolph had a guest appearance on M*A*S*H as an adjutant army general admiring the culinary prowess of a master chef errantly assigned as a foot soldier in a front unit. From 1979 to 1980, he played Donna Pescow's father-in-law on the television series Angie.

In 1982, he appeared in a first-season episode of Family Ties as Jake Keaton, Steven Keaton's father. In 1985, he played the father of Charlie Partana (played by Jack Nicholson) in Prizzi's Honor. He was a special guest star in the 1986 ABC made-for-TV movie The Right of the People, playing Police Chief Hollander in a town soon allowing all adults to carry handguns.

In 1988, Randolph appeared in a Season 2 episode of Matlock as the head of a crime family in "The Investigation". In 1989, he appeared in two episodes of Roseanne playing Al, Roseanne's dad, who was later revealed to be an abusive parent. Also in 1989, he played Clark W. Griswold, Sr. in National Lampoon's Christmas Vacation (with Chevy Chase).

In 1990, he landed a regular series role, co-starring as a family patriarch in the NBC comedy Grand, co-starring Bonnie Hunt, and Michael McKean. In 1991, he guested in an episode of Married... with Children entitled "Al Bundy, Shoe Dick".

Randolph co-starred with Alec Guinness, Leo McKern, Jeanne Moreau and Lauren Bacall, in the BBC production of A Foreign Field (1993) as a World War II veteran returning to France to find the woman he fell in love with.

Also in 1993, Randolph appeared in the fourth season of Seinfeld, as the first actor to play George Costanza's father, Frank Costanza. In the following season, Randolph was replaced in this role by Jerry Stiller.

One of his last film roles was as Joe Fox's grandfather in You've Got Mail (1998).

== Death ==
On February 24, 2004, Randolph died at his home in Hollywood, California, of natural causes, aged 88. He acted until the year before his death.

== Filmography ==
=== Film ===
John Randolph film credits
Year	Title	Role	Notes
1948	The Naked City	Police Dispatcher	uncredited
1951	Fourteen Hours	Fireman	uncredited
1964	Hamlet	Gravedigger	
1966	Seconds	Arthur Hamilton	
1967	Sweet Love, Bitter		
1968	Pretty Poison	Morton Azenauer	
1969	Smith!	Mr. Edwards	
1969	Number One	Coach Southerd	
1969	Gaily, Gaily	Father	
1970	There Was a Crooked Man...	Cyrus McNutt	
1971	Little Murders	Mr. Chamberlain	
1971	Escape from the Planet of the Apes	Chairman	
1972	Conquest of the Planet of the Apes	Commission Chairman	
1973	Serpico	Sidney Green	
1974	Earthquake	Mayor	
1976	Everybody Rides the Carousel	Stage 7 (voice)	
1976	All The President's Men	John Mitchell (voice)	uncredited
1976	King Kong	Captain Ross	
1978	Heaven Can Wait	Former Owner	
1981	Lovely But Deadly	Franklin Van Dyke	
1982	Frances	Kindly Judge	
1985	Prizzi's Honor	Angelo 'Pop' Partanna	
1985	Means and Ends	Bill Henderson	
1988	The Wizard of Loneliness	Doc	
1989	National Lampoon's Christmas Vacation	Clark Griswold, Sr.	
1990	Sibling Rivalry	Charles Turner Sr.	
1991	Iron Maze	Mayor Peluso	
1997	The Hotel Manor Inn	Gus	
1997	Here Dies Another Day	Brace	
1998	A Price Above Rubies	Rebbe Moshe	
1998	You've Got Mail	Schuyler Fox	
1999	The Dogwalker	Ike	
2000	Sunset Strip	Mr. Niederhaus	
2003	Numb		(final film role)

=== Television ===
John Randolph television credits
Year	Title	Role	Notes
1965	Inherit the Wind	Rev. Brown	TV movie
1965	The Patty Duke Show	Coach	1 episode
1967	The Borgia Stick	Smith	TV movie
1967	Mission: Impossible	Alex Morley	1 episode
1968	Bonanza	Doctor Belden	Episode: "Different Pines, Same Wind"
1969	Hawaii Five-O	Marty Sloane	1 episode
1971	A Death of Innocence	Charles Cameron	TV movie
1971-1972	Bonanza	Donavan/Mr. Dawson	2 episodes
1972	The Bob Newhart Show	Junior Harrison	Multiple Episodes
1974	Columbo	Colonel Mayehoff	Episode: "Swan Song"
1974	Kojak	Judge Philip Templeton Makie, Sr.	Episode: "The Best Judge Money Can Buy"
1974	The Missiles of October	George Ball, Undersecretary of State	TV movie
1975–1976	Lincoln	Simon Cameron	TV miniseries
1977	The Gathering	Dr. Hodges	TV movie
1981	The Adventures of Nellie Bly	Joseph Pulitzer	TV movie
1982	Family Ties	Jake Keaton	Episode: “I Never Killed For My Father”
1987	The Equalizer	Jack Rattigan	Episode: "Suspicion of Innocence"
1989	Roseanne	Al Harris	2 episodes
1993	Seinfeld	Frank Costanza	Episode: "The Handicap Spot"
1996	Touched by an Angel	Horace Widdenberg	Episode: "The Journalist"
