= The 52nd Street Project =

American non-profit arts organization

The 52nd Street Project is a non-profit arts education organization founded in 1981 that offers drama programming for the youth in the Hell's Kitchen neighborhood of New York City. The 52nd Street Project creates and produces new plays for, and often by, children and teens between the ages of nine and eighteen. The Project also offers programming in playwriting, theatrical performance, and academic mentoring, as well as facilitating youth engagement in intergenerational performance and scriptwriting.

== History ==
The 52nd Street Project was founded in 1981 by playwright Willie Reale, and evolved as a continuation of his work connecting youth with creative outlets while volunteering with Ensemble Studio Theater and the Police Athletic League. Reale volunteered to teach an acting class that resulted in a culminating performance with his students. The 52nd Street Project served as an ongoing opportunity to teach and work with students, and Reale led The 52nd Street Project until 1999. In 1998, The 52nd Street Project was awarded the Coming Up Taller Award from the President's Committee on the Arts and Humanities.

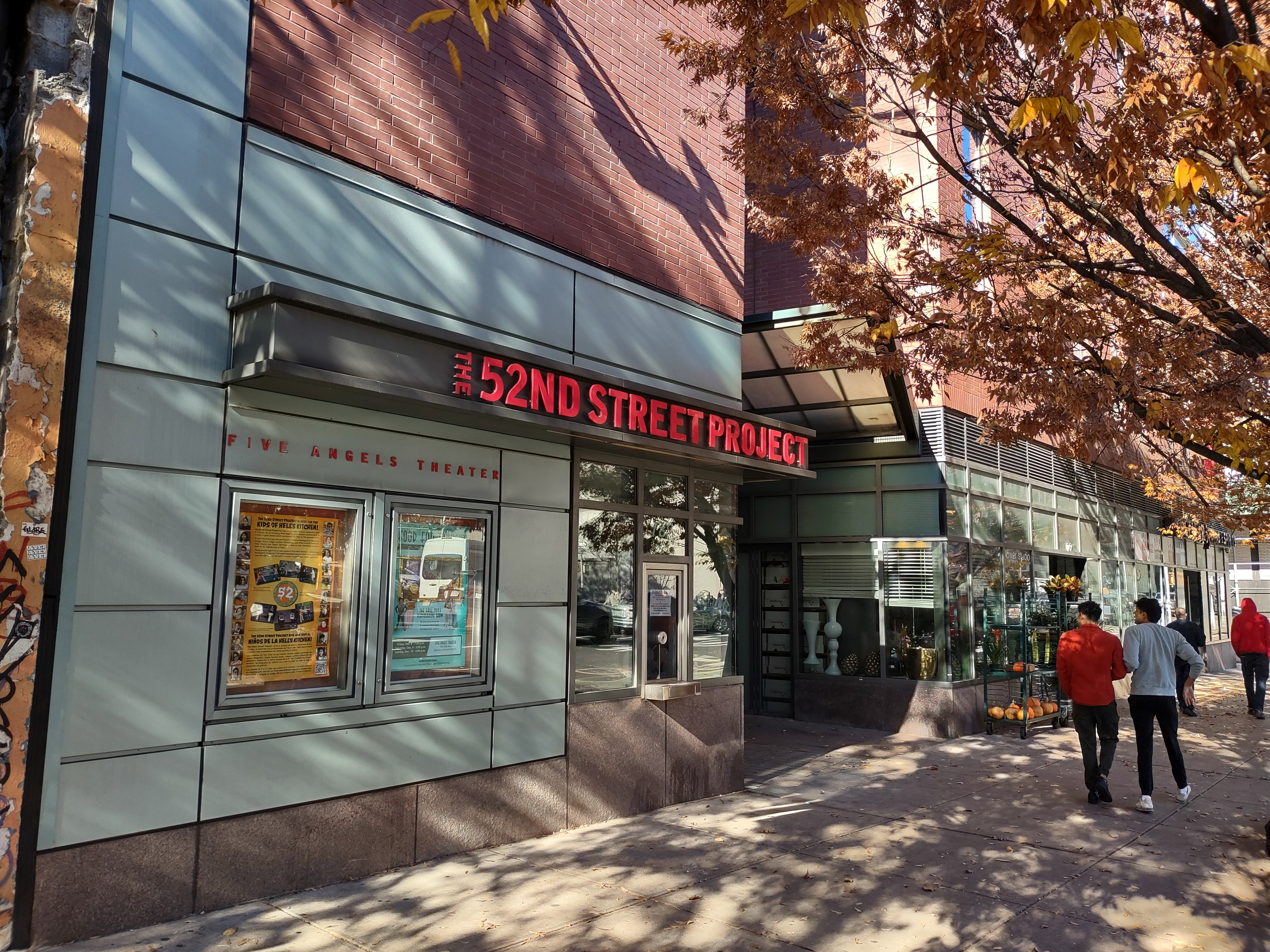
Theater

In 2010, the Project opened its own theater, Five Angels Theater, located at 789 Tenth Avenue, between West 52nd & 53rd Streets, The Five Angels Theater hosts theatrical work of local children; as well as, contemporary theater and dance performances. The building which houses the Five Angels Theater, the Avalon Clinton, also hosts spaces for two other local theatrical organizations: The Alliance of Resident Theatres/New York and MCC Theater.

=== The Clubhouse ===
In 1996, The Clubhouse was established to provide a safe space for children after school and is part of The 52nd Street Project. It provides a community space for kids to hangout, work on homework, and spend time together.

== Notable participants ==
- Rose Byrne
- Bill Camp
- Bobby Cannavale
- Zoë Chao
- David Costabile
- Peter Dinklage
- Edie Falco
- Jonathan Groff
- Cassandra Medley
- Adrienne C. Moore
- Lili Taylor
- Jessica Williams
- Cynthia Nixon
