= List of works by Jonathan Larson =

This article contains a list of musical compositions, stage works, and unproduced projects by the American composer, lyricist, and playwright Jonathan Larson (1960–1996). While best known for his Pulitzer Prize and Tony Award-winning musical Rent, its 2005 film adaptation by Chris Columbus, and the Obie and Dramatist Guild award-winning musical tick, tick... BOOM! and its 2021 film adaptation by Lin Manuel Miranda, Larson's creative output encompassed a wide range of forms beyond this single show. His work includes experimental rock musicals, solo performance pieces, numerous cabarets, contributions to musical revues, scores for dance, and compositions for film, television, and children's media. Larson characteristically blended pop, rock, and traditional musical theatre idioms, often infusing his work with socially conscious themes drawn from his own life and observations. These themes frequently centered on identity, community, artistic ambition, poverty, addiction, multiculturalism, social justice, LGBTQ+ rights, and the impact of the AIDS epidemic, particularly on his close friends. His works reflect his experiences in New York City's "Boho" neighborhood, near the gritty edge of Soho and East Village during the 1980s and 1990s.

== Stage musicals and shows ==
=== El Libro de Buen Amor ===
Jonathan Larson composed the score for this musical adaptation of the 14th-century Spanish didactic poems featured in Libro de buen amor (The Book of Good Love) by Juan Ruiz, considered the greatest poet of medieval Spain, in 1979 while he was an undergraduate student at Adelphi University. The book and lyrics were written by Jacques Burdick, the head of the theatre department and Larson's mentor... The show was to be presented in European Street Theatre style, presenting the actors as if they were a troupe performing impromptu on the street. El Libro de Buen Amor was performed twice - once on October 17 and 18 1979 at Adelphi University, and again in November 1985 at the University of Missouri at Kansas City.

==== Songs featured in El Libro de Buen Amor ====
- "Entrance"
- "I'm Don Juan
- "Intellectum Tibi Dabo"
- "Wandering Student's Song"
- "Aristotle"
- "Enviada"
- "Summertime"
- "Don't Slander Love"
- "Have a Care"
- "I'm Urraca"
- "Blind Beggars"
- "Urraca's Lay"
- "Dies Irae and Epitaph"
- "Finale"

=== 1984 ===
An ambitious early project conceived and started in 1982, 1984 was Jonathan Larson's musical adaptation of George Orwell's dystopian novel Nineteen Eighty-Four. He intended for the musical, for which he wrote the book, music, and lyrics, to be produced in the actual year 1984. This adaptation followed the source material very closely, with one of the only significant changes being that Winston uses a video camera to record his observations rather than a diary. It uses numbers in which Winston directly addresses the audience, such as "Prelude", to introduce the audience to the world of 1984 and quickly acclimate them to terms used throughout the show. Larson actively pursued the rights and sought production, drafting letters to prominent theatre figures like Harold Prince, Joseph Papp, and Alan Alda, creating scripts and set designs, and recording a demo score. However, the project was ultimately halted when the Orwell estate denied him the necessary adaptation rights, partially due to the imminent release of the Hollywood film, directed by Michael Radford. Facing this setback, Larson repurposed the thematic material, and two songs, into his next major original work, the futuristic musical Superbia. The song "SOS," originally written for 1984, was later included in the posthumous off-broadway 2025 revue The Jonathan Larson Project.

=== Mowgli ===
Mowgli is a musical based on Rudyard Kipling's The Jungle Book, which was worked on from 1984 to 1985. The book and lyrics were written by Seth Goldman, with music by Larson. The script was not intended for children and did not soften the dark writing in Kipling's original work. While a demo tape was recorded, when the show failed to attract a producer, Larson ultimately moved onto other projects, most notably Superbia.

==== Songs featured in Mowgli ====
- "Mowgli"
- "Call to Council"
- "Ruler of the Jungle"
- "Shere Khan"
- "We Be of One Blood"
- "Morning Song"
- "Fear"

=== Superbia ===
Superbia was Jonathan Larson's major artistic focus for a significant portion of the mid-1980s, and striving toward the show's production became his consuming ambition during that period. Developed between 1985 and 1991 with book, music, and lyrics by Larson, this futuristic rock musical was conceived during the late night hours at the projectionists room at AREA nightclub in February 1985, where he would spend time with his roommate, Jonathan Burkhart. Superbia would absorb many ideas from his unproduced adaptation of 1984, offering commentary on MTV culture and Reaganism.

Superbia underwent numerous revisions throughout its development. In the early drafts, the story was set in the year 2064 and followed Josh Out, a resident of OutLand — a sector of Superbia, a society where emotions are suppressed at birth. Due to a birth complication, Josh retained his ability to feel and spent his life as an inventor, searching for a way to awaken emotions in his family and fellow citizens. One day, he discovers a mysterious Music Box capable of restoring emotions to the people of OutLand. His path crosses with Elizabeth In, a girl from InCity, who persuades him to share the Music Box's power with others. Josh ventures into InCity, home to the "Ins" — society's celebrities whose scripted lives are broadcast as entertainment for the emotionless Outs. There, he must resist the seduction of fame to complete his mission.

By the time creator Larson completed the final draft, Superbia had evolved into a darker, more introspective narrative exploring humanity's emotional depth and dependence on technology. In this version, Josh is already married to Elizabeth at the story's outset, and both are Outs. Like many others, Elizabeth is deeply addicted to technology and incapable of genuine love. As the plot unfolds, Josh leaves her behind to travel to InCity after discovering that humanity faces an impending "delimbination" — a form of eradication by the very machines that govern Superbia. In his absence, Elizabeth begins to experience real emotions and sets out in pursuit of Josh.

Superbia won the Richard Rodgers Production Award and the Richard Rodgers Development Grant. However, despite performances at Playwrights Horizons, attended by Stephen Sondheim, and a rock concert version produced by Larson's close friend and producer Victoria Leacock at the Village Gate featuring Roger Bart and Valarie Pettiford in September 1989, as well as a final performance in 1991 at the New York Public Theatre, Superbia never received a full production.

In the 2001 production of tick, tick... BOOM! (a three-person adaptation created with script consultant David Auburn), the showstopping number from the early drafts of Superbia, "Come to Your Senses" was selected for inclusion by Larson's close friend Victoria Leacock. Another song from Superbia ("LCD Readout") was included on the 2007 album "Jonathan Sings Larson", produced from Larson's demo tapes and released by the Library of Congress.

"One of These Days" was featured on The Jonathan Larson Project album; and an abridged cover of "Sextet" entitled "Sextet Montage", as featured in the tick, tick... BOOM! film adaptation was released as a digital single in 2022.

=== tick, tick... BOOM! ===
Inspired by the solo pieces of Spalding Grey, Laurie Anderson, and Eric Bogosian and following the disappointment of not achieving a full production of Superbia, Jonathan Larson created tick, tick... BOOM!, an autobiographical piece performed by himself as a solo "rock monologue". Developed between 1990 and 1993, it was originally titled 30/90 (because he was turning thirty in the year 1990), then Boho Days (Boho being the term he created for his neighborhood west of SoHo, but also fit nicely with the term "Bohemian"), before settling on tick, tick... BOOM!, which addressed the urgency of the clock ticking in his head as he turned thirty without having a fully produced broadway show. Larson performed the work himself, accompanied by a piano and rock band, at venues including The Village Gate and the Second Stage Theater in the early 1990s, in productions produced by frequent collaborator Victoria Leacock. The piece channels Larson's anxieties about approaching his 30th birthday, his feelings of artistic rejection after Superbia's failure to launch, the conflict between pursuing a creative career and opting for a more stable life, and his grief and fear surrounding the AIDS crisis, which was affecting his closest friends. Future RENT producer Jeffrey Seller saw the Second Stage reading of Boho Days and subsequently expressed interest in producing Larson's work, organizing a smaller reading of Boho Days for investors.

After Larson's death, Victoria Leacock and Robyn Goodman, with the permission of the Larson family, brought in Pulitzer Prize-winning author and Proof playwright David Auburn to go through Larson's five versions of the rock monologue, and expand it to use three actors. Stephen Oremus was hired to orchestrate and be the musical director, as he had already been immersed in Larson's music while working on the tour of RENT. This version premiered Off-Broadway at the Jane Street Theatre on June 13, 2001, starring Raul Esparza as Jon, Amy Spanger as Susan, and Jerry Dixon as Michael. Esparza received an Obie Award for his performance. The adaptation allowed the work to have a significant theatrical life beyond Larson's own performances, with subsequent productions on London's West End and internationally. In 2021, tick, tick... BOOM!, directed by Lin-Manuel Miranda and starring Andrew Garfield as Larson (in an Academy Award-nominated performance), was released in theaters and on Netflix.

The score includes several notable songs reflecting Larson's life and career, such as "30/90," "Johnny Can't Decide," "Therapy," "Real Life," "Sugar," "See Her Smile," and "Louder Than Words". It also incorporates "Sunday," an homage to Larson's mentor Stephen Sondheim, and repurposes "Come to Your Senses" from Superbia. The song "Find the Key," cut from Larson's original monologue, was later featured the posthumous off-broadway 2025 revue The Jonathan Larson Project, created by Jennifer Ashley Tepper.

=== J.P. Morgan Saves the Nation ===
This one-act musical, with music by Jonathan Larson and book and lyrics by Jeffrey M. Jones, premiered on June 6, 1995. Produced by the experimental theatre company En Garde Arts, Larson was brought onto the project after the original composer, Dan Moses Schreier, withdrew; En Garde's artistic director Annie Hamburger suggested Larson, having seen his work on the Rent workshop.

The musical offers a satirical take on American economics and history through the life of financier J. P. Morgan, focusing particularly on his role in stabilizing the economy during the Panic of 1907. The production was uniquely staged outdoors on the steps of the Federal Hall National Memorial on Wall Street, across from Morgan's own bank building. The cast, which starred James Judy as Morgan, featured a small ensemble and orchestra.

Larson's score demonstrated stylistic versatility, blending historical pastiche (ragtime, marches) with contemporary sounds (rock, grunge, soul). He also repurposed several earlier compositions: “Greenback Dollars” incorporated the musical arrangement from “Identity Crisis (Madonna)” originally featured in Blocks; “Jack O’Diamonds” was a reimagining of “Break Out the Booze”; and “Run That Railroad” reused the guitar hook from “Cool/Fool,” an unused song from RENT. Other songs noted in archives include "All American Businessmen," "Gentlemen's Agreement," and "Your Loving Wife".

Reviews were mixed to negative, despite a positive review from Ben Brantley at The New York Times, and the show closed a week early. The New York Times noted the piece's "intricate, even esoteric book...obviously the product of many hours of library research" and "peppy score in a post-modernist medley of musical voices".

=== Rent ===
Rent originated in 1988 when playwright Billy Aronson conceived the idea of creating "a musical inspired by Giacomo Puccini's La bohème, in which the luscious splendor of Puccini's world would be replaced with the coarseness and noise of modern New York". In 1989, seeking a collaborator, Aronson was introduced to Jonathan Larson by Ira Weitzman. Larson embraced the concept, suggested the title Rent, and proposed shifting the setting from Aronson's envisioned Upper West Side to the grittier East Village and Alphabet City neighborhood where Larson himself lived and struggled as an artist. While Aronson contributed the original concept and some initial lyrics, the final book, music, and lyrics are primarily credited to Larson.

Developed over seven years, Rent depicts a year in the life of a group of young, impoverished artists and musicians in New York's Lower East Side, grappling with creativity, poverty, relationships, addiction, gentrification, and the devastating impact of the HIV/AIDS epidemic. The musical champions themes of love, loss, community, and the urgency of living in the present, encapsulated in the mantra "No day but today".

The musical underwent significant development at the New York Theatre Workshop (NYTW), beginning with a staged reading in 1993, followed by a workshop production in 1994. Larson worked closely with director Michael Greif and NYTW staff during this period. The production was eventually backed by NYTW and producers Jeffrey Seller (who had first encountered Larson's work via Boho Days), Kevin McCollum, and Allan S. Gordon

Tragically, Jonathan Larson died suddenly from an aortic dissection on January 25, 1996, the day before the first scheduled Off-Broadway preview performance at NYTW. With the encouragement of Larson's family, the cast performed the show that evening. It began as a seated concert reading, but by the energetic number "La Vie Boheme", the performers rose and delivered the rest of the show with full staging and passion, albeit without costumes. The performance concluded with a long ovation followed by an audience member shouting, "Thank you, Jonathan Larson"

Rent played its scheduled Off-Broadway engagement to sold-out crowds and critical acclaim, leading to multiple extensions. It transferred to Broadway's Nederlander Theatre, opening on April 29, 1996. The musical became a cultural phenomenon, resonating deeply with audiences, particularly younger generations, and ran on Broadway for over 12 years, closing in September 2008. Its success stemmed from a powerful convergence of Larson's raw, personal experiences in the East Village, its timely and authentic engagement with the AIDS crisis and bohemian life, and his unique rock-infused musical theatre aesthetic, fulfilling his goal of revitalizing the genre. The show generated numerous national tours and international productions. Notable songs include "Seasons of Love," "La Vie Bohème," "One Song Glory," "Rent," "Take Me or Leave Me," "I'll Cover You," and "What You Own".

For his work on Rent, Larson was posthumously awarded the Pulitzer Prize for Drama, the Tony Award for Best Musical, Tony Award for Best Book of a Musical, and Tony Award for Best Original Score; the Drama Desk Award for Outstanding Book of a Musical, Drama Desk Award for Outstanding Music, and the Drama Desk Award for Outstanding Lyrics; the New York Drama Critics Circle Award for Best Musical; the Outer Critics Circle Award for Best Musical in the Off-Broadway category; and Obie Awards for Outstanding Book, Outstanding Lyrics, and Outstanding Music.

=== 1/2 M.T. House ===
1/2 M.T. House was a 1991 conceptual project by Jonathan Larson, initially conceived as a musical under the alternate title Deform Follows Disfunction. Although Larson produced a single demo (the title song "1/2 M.T. House") and developed preliminary plot outlines, he ultimately shifted his focus to working on Rent and tick, tick... BOOM!, leaving the project unfinished.

The initial outline, dated March 14, 1991, centered on Penny Hope, a young, idealistic woman hired to "save" the crumbling Dustin Estate. The estate, located near the Rio Grande, had once been the most renowned apple orchard in the region, established nearly 200 years earlier by British expatriate Wiley Jack Cross, who had tricked Native Americans out of the land. Over time, the Cross family shifted from apple farming to the production of cyanide derived from apple seeds. After using cyanide to suppress an uprising by neighboring communities, the Crosses abandoned apple cultivation entirely, instead importing apples solely to extract more poison. In an effort to pacify the increasingly discontented apple pickers and residents, the Crosses distributed cable television and constructed the world's largest satellite dish, which further devastated the orchard by blocking out sunlight.

As the estate fell deeper into disrepair and mortgage payments came due, "The President" (Old Man Cross), his alcoholic evangelist son Wiley, and his skinhead grandson Jack devised a plan to sell the estate to their now-wealthy former rivals, the Tanaka and Beggelhoffer families. To prevent an uprising among the disillusioned "apple people," they decided to stage a public relations campaign to appear as though they were trying to save the estate. Believing she would be ineffective, they hire Penny Hope to lead the effort, expecting her to fail.

However, Penny immediately recognizes the corruption and decay around her and resolves to genuinely rehabilitate the orchard. She rallies the disaffected residents, leading yoga classes and aerobics sessions to boost morale and prepare them for farming work despite the lack of available land and sunlight. Penny approaches Jack Cross to plead for a chance to revitalize the orchard, but Jack refuses, reminding her she had been hired to redevelop the property into a resort, motel, or cineplex—and implying that he would only reconsider if she sleeps with him. Furious, Penny retaliates by blowing up the massive satellite dish, restoring sunlight to the estate and reigniting hope for revival. The outline ends with the question of whether Penny would ultimately succeed in saving the Dustin Estate.

A later outline significantly revised the concept. Set in a post-apocalyptic 1990s without oil, the story focused on two families, the Hopes and the Paines. The Hope family included Daisy and Penny, New Age idealists who fled an urban ghetto; Oliver Wendell, a toddler; and their estranged brother Spike. Their father, Earnest Hope, was portrayed as a decorated general from the Gulf War. The Paine family, led by President Tom-Tom Paine, was a prominent political dynasty. Other characters included Tom-Tom's daughter Angel, depicted as a skinhead, heroin-addicted singer and a victim of incest, Angel's boyfriend, Jeremy, a member of the Shubert family who supported Penny's community work, Reverend Whitey Cross, a closeted evangelist, and Bob and Shirley Hart, an aging, paranoid couple parodying the characters from the television series Newhart.

== Musical revues and cabarets ==
Throughout the 1980s and early 1990s, Jonathan Larson wrote and performed in numerous cabaret shows and contributed songs to various musical revues. Venues like Adelphi University, the Don't Tell Mama cabaret club, and collaborations with peers in groups like Naked Angels provided platforms for this developmental work.

=== Shogun ===
A satirical cabaret inspired by the 1980 miniseries of the same name. It tells the story of Angelo Blackthorne (played by Larson), a captain whose crew is shipwrecked on the coast of Japan in 1637. Through sheer incompetence, Angelo manages to become a shogun. It was performed at Adelphi University in October 1980 with lyrics by Nicholas Petron and David Stewart, music by David Stewart and two additional numbers by Jonathan Larson.

==== Songs featured in Shogun ====
- "The Letter Home"
- "O Yoseru"

=== Herstory ===
This cabaret focused on women's issues, with the subtitle "Little Miss Muffet Spat on Her Tuffet". It was performed at Adelphi University in November 1980 with a script by Nicholas Petron, lyrics by Petron, Dan Kagan, and Melody Cooper, and music by Jonathan Larson.

==== Songs featured in Herstory ====
- "Herstory"
- "The Same"
- "Menopause"
- "Longevity"
- "Platinum White"
- "Money is Power (The Lesson)"

=== Saved! ===
Co-written with David Glenn Armstrong while they were students at Adelphi University, Saved! was originally titled Sacrimmoralinority: An Immoral Musical on the Moral Majority and staged there in 1981. Described as a Brechtian-themed cabaret, it explored themes of religion, morality, and societal hypocrisy with a satirical edge. After graduation, it was renamed Saved! - An Immoral Musical on the Moral Majority and received a four-week showcase run at Rusty's Storefront Blitz, a small theatre on 42nd Street, in February 1983. It was also taped for cable television in January 1982. The show won Larson and Armstrong a writing award from ASCAP.

==== Cast of Saved! ====
- Joe Aiello
- Sarah Combs
- Edward Fitz as Reverend Jerry
- Scott Burkell
- Regina L. Davis
- Toni Wilen (Note: Week 1 only)
- Bambi Jones (Note: Weeks 2-4 only)

==== Songs featured in Saved! ====
- "Saved/We're the New Christian Right"
- "Evolution"
- "Moment of Silence" (Note: Only featured in the show under the title "Saved!")
- "Jerry" (Note: Only featured in the show under the title Sacrimmoralinority.)
- "School Prayers"
- "Moment of Silence #2"
- "Jerry's Kids"
- "We Miss Ya, Anita (Bryant)"
- "Moment of Silence #3"
- "Censorship Waltz"
- "Abortion"
- "When I Grow Up (E.R.A.)"
- "Politics"
- "Anita"
- "Finale"

=== The Steak Tartare Caper ===
Performed at Adelphi University in April, 1981 and then again in April, 1997, this cabaret featured book and lyrics by Nicholas Petron and music by Jonathan Larson. This spoof on mystery stories featured a crossover between various well-known characters, such as Nancy Drew, Nick and Nora Charles, and Sam Spade, solving a crime in 1940's Chicago, at the end of the Great Depression.

==== Cast of The Steak Tartare Caper (1981) ====
- Bob Mark as Sam Spade
- Darlene Camp as Dutchess
- Joe Kessner as Nick Charles
- Traci Robinson as Nora Charles
- Tammy Puris as Margot Welsh
- Francine Bianco as Nancy Drake
- Maggie Lally as Greta Schlau
- Nancy O'Connor as Mimi Thomas
- Jennifer Harger as Dorothy Penn
- Connie Tripiani as Crystal Stein
- Theresa Smith as Jocelyn Lane
- Jerry Mathers as The Beaver

==== Songs featured in The Steak Tartare Caper ====
- "Windy City"
- "Phillip Morris"
- "We're Charles"
- "Margot's Lament (I Made My Decision on Clark & Division)"
- "Alibi (Vocal Fugue)"
- "I Wish I Could Say"
- "But..."
- "It's True (I'm Nancy Drew)"
- "Crime Don't Pay"

=== Shall I Wrap It to Go or Will You Eat it Here? ===
Written by Nicholas Petron in 1982 with music by Larson, this musical revue about New York City was workshopped several times but ultimately was not picked up. Larson wrote three produced demos for the show, which starred several Adelphi alumni. (Note: As of right now, Scott Bloom is the only identified cast member of the show, but there were at least five Adelphi alumni involved.) Two songs from this show would go on to be used as regular numbers in the J. Glitz piano-bar act.

==== Cast of Shall I Wrap It to Go or Will You Eat it Here? ====
- Scott Bloom

==== Songs featured in Shall I Wrap it to Go or Will You Eat it Here? ====
- "New York Game"
- "S-S-Show B-B-Business"
- "At the Tone"

=== J. Glitz ===
J. Glitz was a piano-bar act developed and performed by Jonathan Larson, Marin Mazzie, and Scott Burkell between 1982 and 1984. The trio would play characters, with Mazzie going by Joan Glitz, Burkell as Elwood Fritz, and Larson as Marv. They would perform a mix of music from covers of various songs, as well as original Jonathan Larson works, including "After the Revolution" from 1984.

==== Original works performed by J. Glitz ====
- "We're J. Glitz"
- "Flame"
- "Heart on the Ground"
- "After the Revolution"
- "At the Tone"
- "New York Game"

=== American Scream ===
Written by Jonathan Larson with Maggie Lally at Adelphi University in April, 1982, with the alternate title The Great American Letdown: Armageddon My Act Together & Taking It on the Road. American Scream examines success and failure from multiple perspectives, offering commentary on the practicality of the American dream, and was originally inspired by the Studs Terkel book American Dreams: Lost and Found. The show presents these perspectives through eight characters, whose songs each take on unique musical styles.

==== Songs featured in American Scream ====
- "Atarii Videoland"
- "Conflict of Interest"
- "Funny Lady"
- "Hero Image Blues"
- "So I'm Bad"
- "So's My Old Man"
- "Solid White Corvette"
- "Where Is the Dream?" (Note: A montage of multiple smaller numbers, including "Glamour Queen", "Hurt Me, Mommy", "I'm a City Woman", "I'm Old", "Jap Rap", "Princess Di", "Rape, Rape, Rape... Nothing Sacred", and "Waiting for My Big Break".)

=== Pageantry ===
This cabaret show, with music written by Jonathan Larson and the book and lyrics by David Armstrong, was created for Adelphi University and performed on November 16 and 17, 1984. It was set in a beauty pageant in Northeast Hamilton County, Iowa, as six finalists express their hopes and dreams.

==== Songs featured in Pageantry ====
- "Biggest Night of Our Lives"
- "Little Miss This"
- "I Deserve It All"
- "Miss Universe"
- "Lookin' to Get Laid"
- "Fun in the Sun (In Iowa)"
- "Bittersweet"
- "When Did the Days Go By?"
- "Don't Talk to Me Like That"
- "Footsteps"
- "Finale"

=== One Big Happy Family ===
Subtitled "Another hard edged look at America or More Evils of Ronald Reagan's America", and tackling issues such as the rise of the religious right and its consumerist impact on America, this show was performed at Adelphi University and the Panache nightclub in 1985. It featured a book and lyrics by Michael John Lindsay and music by Jonathan Larson.

==== Cast of One Big Happy Family ====
- Chip Bond
- Beth Flynn
- Barbara J. Gullotti
- Margo Hall
- Clinton Leupp
- Michael John Lindsay

==== Songs featured in One Big Happy Family ====
- "George Shultz Rap"
- "I'm Stupid"
- "Homosexual Rag"
- "Middle Class Blues"
- "And the Candle Burns"
- "It Wasn't Me (Finale)"

=== Departure ===
Departure, written and directed by Scott Bloom, was presented in April 1986 by The Actors Theatre of Manhattan, a troupe comprising actors in their late twenties who met at the Ensemble Studio Theatre. The production inverted the parable of the Prodigal Son, focusing on the act of leaving rather than the return. Through a series of sketches and songs, the show explored the theme of children drifting away from their parents. Jonathan Larson composed multiple tracks for the project, two of which were selected for the final production.

==== Cast of Departure ====
- James R. Adler
- Alyssa Allyn
- Curtis Borg
- Daphne Greaves
- Henry Hagerty
- Arthur Kilduff
- Michael McGuinness
- Maureen Nelligan

==== Songs featured in Departure ====
- "Lonely Freedom"
- "Lock Up Your Kids"

=== Prostate of the Union ===
Subtitled "The Evils of Ronald Reagan's America," this satirical musical revue was performed at Adelphi University in February 1987. Larson co-wrote the book and lyrics with Michael Lindsay and composed the music. It featured politically charged commentary.

==== Songs featured in Prostate of the Union ====
- "Now We've Got You Thinking (Words)"
- "Emotional Fallout"
- "Will"
- "Falling Apart"
- "Valentine's Day"
- "The Grand Finale"

=== Bubble Gum ===
Written in 1987, Bubble Gum is a one-woman play with book and lyrics by Alicia Stone, for which Larson composed music, contributing four songs. The show follows Judy, a working-class English girl who becomes famous after accidentally popping her gum into her hair just before a concert. Her friends—blue-collar Rockanne, hardcore middle-class feminist Suzanna, upwardly mobile yuppie Hillary, and fashionista Marta—each pursue different paths in 1980s society. As Rockanne tries to reconnect Judy with a hospitalized relative, Suzanna and Marta have achieved success as a performance artist and fashion designer, respectively, and are more interested in exploiting Judy's tabloid fame than in genuine friendship. Despite Judy's attempts to have sincere conversations, she is ultimately swept deeper into the manufactured celebrity machine, culminating in her submission to her agent's demands and the tabloid narratives about her.

==== Songs featured in Bubble Gum ====
- "Life Is (What a Freak)"
- "Look at You (Judy’s Song)"
- "Where Have all the Men Gone?"
- "Princess Lei-Me"

=== Emote Control ===
Performed in October 1987 at Adelphi University, this cabaret featured book and lyrics co-written by Michael Lindsay and Jonathan Larson, with music by Larson. The piece delved into the harming influences of television.

==== Cast of Emote Control ====
- Richie Alva
- Sheri Brocklebank
- Donna Block
- Tony Clarke
- Carmella DeAngelis
- Nanette Ferraro
- Linda Gurman
- Michael Hannon
- Cathy Landherr
- Lucia Minneci

==== Songs featured in Emote Control ====
- "Emote Control"
- "I Am the Very Model of a Modern Couch Potato"
- "People Meters"
- "Cartoon Hell"
- "I Won't Close My Eyes" (Note: "I Won't Close My Eyes" would later go on to be used in the darker scripts of Superbia (V1.5 and V2))
- "Television Babylon"

=== Sitting on the Edge of the Future ===
This was a proposed but ultimately unproduced revue conceived by producer Michael Barrett for the American Music Theatre Festival (AMTF) in the summer of 1989. The concept was based on the optimistic "city of the future" exhibits featured at the 1939 New York World's Fair. Each song was to be written by a different composer, assigned a specific item or concept demonstrated at the fair. Larson composed the song "Hosing the Furniture," inspired by the introduction of vinyl furniture. Other composers slated to be involved included William Finn and Michael John LaChiusa. For his contribution, Larson received the Stephen Sondheim Award from AMTF in 1989.

=== Presidential Politics ===
This unproduced satirical musical revue project from the fall of 1989 had many working titles including National Lampoon's Tricentennial Revue, The Future of Presidential Politics, National Lampoon’s American Tricentennial, and 2076. Spanning only 25 minutes and three scenes, Presidential Politics tells a story about the marketing of a presidential candidate, Barbara Bosom. Throughout the show, Barbara learns about making commercials, smearing the opponent, and avoiding the issues. While the revue was workshopped, it was ultimately never produced.

==== Songs featured in Presidential Politics ====
- "The Vision Thing"
- "Do Unto Them"
- "Likability/La Di Da"
- "Finale (Coda)"

=== Blocks ===
Blocks was conceived as a rock revue circa 1992–1995, and was commissioned by the Broadway Arts Theatre for Young Audiences, an organization developing one-hour musical that could be performed at schools with small casts (six or fewer actors). It centered around topics relating to self-esteem, featuring music by Jonathan Larson, lyrics by Hal Hackady, and a book co-written by Larson and Hackady. Blocks was posthumously reworked in partnership with Housing Works into an off-broadway show entitled I Make Me a Promise, keeping many of the original songs.

==== Songs featured in Blocks ====
- "Blocks"
- "Nobody's Home"
- "Reasons to Fail"
- "Blue"
- "Who Am I?"
- "Identity Crisis (Madonna)"
- "Parents for Sale"
- "This Is Not a Bruise"
- "I'd Forgotten Sky"
- "Make Your Own Music"
- "It's Alright to Cry" (Note: Song was dropped from the final running order.)
- "Anybody Seen My Smile?"

=== Other revue and cabaret contributions ===
Larson contributed individual songs to various cabaret evenings and benefits, particularly those produced by the Naked Angels theatre company. These include:

Larson served as music director for the 1979 Adelphi University cabaret Remember then...A night at the Brooklyn Fox.

"If it Moves, Fuck it", for the Adelphi cabaret Out Behind the Bard (1983)

"Valentine's Day" (originally from Prostate of the Union) was included in a compilation cabaret titled No Sacred Cows: A Sample Cabaret (1985–1989).

"Don't Look At Me", for "Ethics Revue", a 1989 revue by Theatreworks USA.

"The Truth Is a Lie," addressing censorship and fake news, for the Naked Angels event The Naked Truth: Ten Takes on Censorship (1990).

"Opening Song" and "The Answer to New York's Problems", the latter with lyrics by Dan Kagan, were written for the Maggie Lally cabaret, Bonfire of the Insanities (1990).

"Break Out the Booze" for Tell Them Angel Sent Me (1990), an environmentally staged piece set on the last night of Prohibition, performed at the Tatou club. Larson also served as performer, accompanist, and associate musical director for this event.

"Rap Mitzvah" (1990), performed at the opening night of William Finn's Falsettoland. Lyrics were written alongside Ben Stiller and Jeff Kahn.

"Iron Mike," a response to the Exxon Valdez oil spill, for the Naked Angels benefit Angels Get Down to Earth Day (1990).

"White Male World" for the Naked Angels revue Skirting the Issues (1991).

"Reality of the Dream" (1991): A composition created together with Gordon Dahlquist as part of the New York Theatre Workshop's "Usual Suspects" artist group. As sponsored collaborations were a frequent opportunity for artists in the group, Larson and Dahlquist worked together on an adaptation of one of Luigi Pirandello's short stories, titled Reality of the Dream.

"Love Heals" for Love Heals: The Alison Gertz Foundation for AIDS Education (1992).

=== The Jonathan Larson Project (Posthumous Revue) ===
Conceived by theatre historian Jennifer Tepper and first presented as a concert series at Feinstein's/54 Below in 2018, followed by a cast album released by Ghostlight Records in 2019 and an Off-Broadway production at the Orpheum Theatre in 2025, The Jonathan Larson Project is a musical revue showcasing modern covers of previously unheard or obscure songs by Larson. Tepper extensively researched Larson's archives at the Library of Congress, uncovering material from unproduced musicals, cut songs from Rent and tick, tick... BOOM!, standalone theatre songs, pop songs, and cabaret numbers. The revue brought updated versions of many of these works to public attention for the first time.

Songs featured in The Jonathan Larson Project (Off Broadway)
Song title	Original source/context	Year(s)
"Greene Street"	Standalone theatre song	1983
"One of These Days"	Superbia (Pre-V1 Draft)	c. 1985
"Break Out the Booze"	Cabaret: Tell Them Angel Sent Me (Naked Angels)	1990
"Casual Sex, Pizza, and Beer"	Standalone drinking song	1984
"Out of My Dreams"	Pop Song	1989/1991
"Valentine's Day"	Cabaret: Prostate of the Union; also considered for Rent	1987
"Falling Apart"	Cabaret: Prostate of the Union	1987
"Hosing the Furniture"	Unproduced Revue: Sitting on the Edge of the Future	1989
"Find the Key"	Cut from tick, tick... BOOM! (monologue version)	c. 1991
"The Vision Thing"	Unproduced Revue: Presidential Politics	1989
"Iron Mike"	Cabaret: Angels Get Down to Earth Day (Naked Angels)	1990
"Likability/La Di Da"	Unproduced Revue: Presidential Politics	1989
"White Male World"	Cabaret: Skirting the Issues (Naked Angels)	1991
"The Truth is a Lie"	Cabaret: The Naked Truth: Ten Takes on Censorship (Naked Angels)	1990
"Rhapsody"	Standalone theatre song	1984
"S.O.S."	Unproduced Musical: 1984	1982
"Pura Vida"	Pop Song	1991
"Love Heals"	Written for Love Heals: The Alison Gertz Foundation for AIDS Education	1992
"Piano"	Standalone theatre song	1983
"Destination: Sky"	Children's Video: Away We Go!	c. 1994/1995

== Television and film ==
=== Genre in a Drum ===
Circa 1986–1988, Larson composed the music for an unproduced music video concept titled Genre in a Drum. Larson collaborated with Victoria Leacock, who was inspired by a Stephen Saban article about bad clubbing nights in Details Magazine (June 1986). Combining narration by Ben Stiller and drum-synth music alongside a female chorus singing "It's times like these, I wish I were licensed to kill...", it was produced and pitched as a video to be played at clubs. A demo recording was made in 1988, but ultimately the project didn't move forward. Larson would eventually reuse the backing track with new lyrics to create "Out of My Dreams".

=== The Wreck of the Barque Stefano Screenplay ===
Between 1991 and 1992, Jonathan Larson collaborated with Edward Rosenstein on an unproduced screenplay titled The Wreck of the Barque Stefano. It was adapted from Gustave Wrathe's book detailing the true story of the 1875 shipwreck of the Barque Stefano off the coast of North West Cape, Australia. Although the screenplay was completed, it was never produced as a film.

=== Sacred Cows ===
Conceptualized in 1992–1993, Sacred Cows was an ambitious project intended as a weekly television anthology series. Devised and written by a collaborative team consisting of Jonathan Larson, Rusty Magee, Bob Golden, Paul Scott Goodman, and Jeremy Roberts, the show aimed to put contemporary, pop-culture, and celebrity-inspired twists on well-known Biblical or mythological stories. The collaborators chose public domain stories to avoid rights issues.

Only one episode, a pilot titled "A New Beginning," was fully developed and recorded as a demo. This episode reimagined the Garden of Eden story: God (voiced by Larson) is portrayed as a temperamental rock star who, after destroying the old world, creates a new paradise and its inhabitants. Adame (Rusty Magee) is a modern, pop-savvy alpha female, and Yves (Paul Scott Goodman) is a naive hippie folk singer. The Serpent appears as a three-headed, cigar-chomping advertising agent (voiced by Larson, Goodman, Golden, and Magee) who tempts them with the Tree of Knowledge, represented as a tower of televisions offering media and technology. Unlike the original biblical story, Adame and Yves are trapped by God in the Garden of Eden after disobeying his orders, being forced to stay there for eternity.

The musical score reflected the collaborative nature and satirical intent, blending various early-1990s styles: ethereal pop for the Angels, pop-rap for Adame, country-western for Yves, hard rock for God, and jazz for the Serpent, supplemented by advertising jingles. Jeremy Roberts handled arrangements, integrating the diverse styles.

The television series concept was ultimately shelved due to scheduling conflicts among the five composers. The demo recording featuring the composers performing the roles resurfaced years later and was released on iTunes in 2013, but has since been de-listed from all storefronts.

==== Songs featured in Sacred Cows ====
- "Prologue/A New Beginning"
- "Get It Right This Time"
- "Another Go"
- "I'm God"
- "In Paradise"
- "Give Me Your Rib"
- "Yipee Ay Oh"
- "Gotta Get a Jingle"
- "The Tree Montage"
- "The Apocalypse"
- "No More Mister Nice Guy"
- "In Eden"

=== Cold Fever ===
A title song written by Larson in 1993, intended for the 1995 film of the same name. Ultimately, the director chose not to use the song for the film.

=== White Squall ===
Jonathan Larson created incidental music for the 1996 Hollywood film White Squall, directed by Ridley Scott. The film depicts the true story of a group of students on a sailing ship caught in a sudden, violent storm. In need of sea shanties for the film, writer Todd Robinson introduced Ridley to Larson, who would send him a finished shanty entitled "Don’t Let Go the Line" in 1995. Ultimately, the tune went unused in the final film as the work crew on the ship already knew some shanties and it was more practical not to have them learn new music.

== Pop songs ==
Larson composed a variety of pop songs during the course of his career. While none were produced, some have made their way to the public via performances such as The Jonathan Larson Project, the tick, tick... BOOM! film soundtrack, and the Larson Sings Larson album. These include:

- "Flame" (1983)
- "All I Know" (1984)
- "Heart on the Ground (So Many Curves)" (1984) – Lyrics by Scott Burkell
- "Only Takes a Few" (1984)
- "Sushirama" (1985)
- "Go for It" (Mid-1980s)
- "Forget Me Not" (1987)
- "Out of My Dreams" (1990)
- "Open Road" (1991)
- "Pura Vida" (1991)
- "We Can't Go On" (1991)
- "You Called My Name" (1991)
- "How Could We Take Each Other Here" (Early 1990s) – Lyrics by Tony Powers

== Theater songs ==
In addition to full-length musicals, Larson wrote various standalone songs intended for the stage, often collaborating with other lyricists.

- "Leila" (Early 1980s)
- "Casual Sex, Pizza, and Beer" (1981) - Lyrics by Ralph Scarpato
- "Yerikerligah" (1982)
- "Barroom Conversation" (1983) – Lyrics by Kip Hubbard
- "Castles in the Sand" (1983) – Lyrics by Kip Hubbard
- "Friend" (1983)
- "Giznoid Claptrap" (1983) – Lyrics by Kip Hubbard
- "Greene Street" (1983)
- "Nantucket" (1983)
- "Piano" (1983)
- "Rhapsody" (1983)
- "All For Now" (1987) – Lyrics by Mark O'Donnell
- "Earth is Turning" (1987) – Lyrics by Mark O'Donnell
- "Remember Me" (1987) – Lyrics by Mark O'Donnell
- "Suffer from the Heat" (1987)
- "You Owe Me a Dollar" (1987) – Lyrics by Mark O'Donnell
- "Passing Chords" (Late 1980s) – Lyrics by Michael Abrams
- "Rap Mitzvah" (1990)
- "With Open Eyes" (1994) – Lyrics by Nan Knighton

== Children's media and freelance work ==
Alongside his major original projects, Jonathan Larson undertook a wide variety of freelance composing work throughout his career. This included numerous projects for children's media, as well as scores for dance pieces and incidental music for plays.

=== Sesame Street ===
Larson composed music for several animated segments for the popular children's television show Sesame Street around 1992–1993. Three compositions accompanied stop motion animations produced by Al Jarnow, while the other two ultimately went unaired. The following songs have been confirmed to be composed by Larson:

- "Real Cats Drink Milk"
- "Orange"
- "Cat Blocks"
- "Feet" (Note: Unused composition)
- "Suppertime" (Note: Rearrangement of the song "Summertime, Summertime")

=== Away We Go! ===
This children's video project was conceived by Jonathan Larson and his collaborator Bob Golden. Aimed at preschool-aged children, the video features a puppet character named Newt the Newt on a musical journey through New York City. Larson co-directed the video and wrote four original songs for it. Larson and Golden also made brief cameo appearances in the video. The video was released on VHS in 1996, and on DVD in 2004 via mail order.

==== Songs featured in Away We Go! ====
- "Get Ready"
- "Down"
- "Driving in a Taxi"
- "On the Water"
- "Bus Ride"
- "Here and There"
- "Destination Sky"
- "Away We Go!"

=== Looney Tune-Ups ===
Larson composed a song for a planned series of shorts featuring the Looney Tunes, intended to encourage children to exercise. The short would have featured Sylvester, and the number was entitled "Sylvester Shuffle".

=== Electric High ===
In 1984, Larson was commissioned to write "Close Harmony", which was used to promote the Electric High series of young adult romance books by Jane Thornton. It was produced by Jim Klein in 1985, and distributed on a cassette alongside "Breakaway", which was composed by David Stewart.

=== Red Dot Bop ===
In the late 1980s, Larson was commissioned by advertising firm Clarion Marketing to create a song entitled "Red Dot Bop". This song was ultimately used for an in-house promo.

=== Book and cassette adaptations ===
Larson composed background music and themes for several popular children's book-and-cassette packages in the late 1980s:

An American Tail (1986): Provided background music for the read-along adaptation of the animated film. (This is distinct from the film's score by James Horner.) Books included "Lost Little Feivel" and "Escape from the Catsacks".

The Blinkins (1986): Composed background music for this series of storybooks with cassettes featuring firefly characters created by LJN toys. Episodes included "The Big Show," "The Magic Light," "Meet the Blinkins," and "Where is Baby Twinkle?".

Sweet Valley Twins (1987): Composed background music and theme songs (with lyrics by Nicholas Petron) for audio cassette adaptations of the popular young adult book series. Episodes included "Best Friends" and "The Haunted House".

The Land Before Time (1988): Scored two book-and-cassette episodes based on the animated film. (Distinct from the film's score by James Horner.) Books included "Friends in Need" and "Search for the Valley".

=== Scores for dance ===
Larson composed scores for several modern dance pieces, primarily for choreographer Brenda Daniels:

Garden Party (1987): Score for a dance piece choreographed by Brenda Daniels, performed September 10–12, 1987. It consisted of two segments, "Ideal Landscape" and "Cartoon Artificial".

More (1988): While Larson did not compose any original work for this Brenda Daniels performance, he did serve as the music coordinator for several selections.

Venus and Other Myths (1989): Score for a dance piece choreographed by Brenda Daniels. Larson composed multiple selections for this piece, including "Ahhs Loop", "Beyond 'Beyond the Sea'", "Drums", "Shell", "Suburban Angels", "Disco", and "Babylon".

Damage (1990): Score for a dance piece choreographed by Brenda Daniels, performed January 6, 1990. Original compositions include "Let", "Skin", "Metal", and "Stone". Arias and popular love songs were also used amidst the original compositions. "Let" was later performed again in Brenda Daniels' Four Dances of Vulnerability.

Roam (1990–1991): A dance score created for choreographer Bill Douglas.

=== Incidental music for plays ===
Larson composed incidental music for stage plays:

The Villagers (1990): Music for a play by John Francis Istel. Larson also served as sound designer for the production.

A Darker Purpose (aka Naked Las Vegas) (1991): Music for the play by Wendy Riss, produced by Naked Angels.

A Midsummer Night's Dream (1991): Incidental music for a performance at the New Jersey Shakespeare Festival.

God's Heart (1995): Music for the play by Craig Lucas.

I Told My Mother I Hate Her (1995): An Act One closing song, for a play written by Dan Kagan.

=== Music for Jann Wenner ===
Around 1990–1991, Larson composed music for Jann Wenner, the publisher of Rolling Stone magazine, providing music for Wenner's home videos.

Music written for Jann Wenner

- "Alexander's Rap"
- "Aloha (Hawaii)"
- "Autumn" (Note: Uses the same instrumentation as "Open Road")
- "Breakfast in Bed"
- "Bubbles"
- "Cars"
- "Flying a Kite"
- "Greensleeves"
- "Gus"
- "Haircut"
- "Jann Ski"
- "Jann Snow"
- "Jingling Bells"
- "Medieval Jousting"
- "Meet Jann Wenner"
- "Mommy's Pregnant"
- "Nursery Times"
- "Rupert Everett" (Note: Uses the same instrumentation as "The Vision Thing")
- "Sailing the Obsession"
- "Say Da-Da"
- "Sledding"
- "Sylvia Martin"
- "Tennis With Lorne Michaels"
- "Theo"
- "This Old Jann"
- "Windex"

=== American Authors ===
In October 1986, Larson created music for a program called Great American Authors, produced by The National Theatre for the Performing Arts for high school audiences. American Authors featured scenes from Our Town, The Gift of the Magi, The House of Seven Gables, and Tom Sawyer, with each song named after the title of the book it was meant to portray.

=== Performance role: Billy Bishop Goes to War ===
While not a compositional work, Larson's performing career included acting and playing music in a 1991 production of the Canadian musical Billy Bishop Goes to War (book, music, and lyrics by John MacLachlan Gray) at the American Stage Company in Teaneck, New Jersey. He performed alongside his friend, actor Roger Bart
