= Willie Reale =

American lyricist

Willie Reale is an American lyricist who has received Academy Award nominations for best song category for his work as a lyricist on the movie Dreamgirls and has won 3 Emmy awards (in 2010, 2011) as one of the writer/producers for The Electric Company.

== Early life and career ==
Willie Reale is an American lyricist. He grew up in Park Ridge, New Jersey with four brothers and a sister.

Theater credits include Once Around the City (book and lyrics), which was produced off-broadway at the Second Stage Theatre. He was nominated for two Tony Awards for A Year With Frog and Toad, which he wrote with his brother, composer Robert Reale. With his brother (and Richard Dresser) he has written Johnny Baseball, which was produced at the American Repertory Theater.

Reale has an Academy Award nomination in the best song category for his work as a lyricist on the movie Dreamgirls and has won 3 Emmy awards (in 2010, 2011) as one of the writer/producers behind the recent reinvention of 1970's literacy classic, The Electric Company on PBS. Willie has worked written extensively for network television and has been nominated 3 times for Writer's Guild Awards.

== 52nd Street Project ==
In 1981, Reale founded The 52nd Street Project, an organization that brings inner-city children together with professional theater artists. He served as the theater's artistic director for 18 years. He wrote '52 Pick Up,' the Project's how-to manual. The 52nd Street Project's programs are currently being replicated at 14 sites across country and in Europe. In June 1994, he was awarded a MacArthur Fellowship in recognition of his ingenuity in creating theater and theater education programs for young people. The 52nd Street Project was recognized by a Coming Up Taller Award from the Clinton White House. In fact the name of the award, which recognizes arts in education organizations, was taken from this quote by Willie: 'There is no way to fast forward and know the result of this work. But I have seen the pride in their eyes and heard the joy in their voices. I have watched them take a bow and come up taller.'

== Personal life ==
Reale was married to producer Jenny Gersten, they are now divorced. They have two children, Augustus and Leonardo.

In an interview on the radio program Conversations with Allan Wolper on WBGO 88.3FM, Reale spoke about his time living in Hell's Kitchen and how New York is a big inspiration for his work.

== Awards and nominations ==
- Academy Award for Best Original Song (with Henry Krieger) for "Patience" from Dreamgirls.
- Tony Award for Best Book of a Musical (2003) for A Year with Frog and Toad.
- Tony Award for Best Original Score (2003) (with Robert Reale) for A Year with Frog and Toad.
- Writers Guild of America Award (2004) (with Mark Palmer) for Out There.

In June 1994, he was awarded a MacArthur Fellowship in recognition of his ingenuity in creating theater and theater education programs for young people.

== Plays ==
- Fast Women
- Many Happy Returns
- Short And Sweet

== Musicals ==
- Johnny Baseball (2010 musical) (American Repertory Theater)( Williamstown Theatre Festival
- A Year with Frog and Toad (Broadway)—2003
- The Dinosaur Musical
- Once Around the City
- Quark Victory
- Short And Sweet
- Many Happy Returns
- A Little Soul-Searching

== Television ==
- Billions
- Blue Bloods
- Next Caller
- Haskett's Chance
- Tilt
- The Jury
- Keen Eddie
- Mister Sterling
- Out There
- Deadline
- Homicide: Life on the Street
- Living and Working in Space: The Countdown Has Begun
- The Electric Company
