= Robert Reale =

American composer

- Born: 1956 (age 69–70)
- Occupation: Composer
- Spouse: Kate Nelligan (m. 1989; div. 2000)
- Children: 1

Robert Reale (born 1956) is an American composer with a long list of credits in film, TV and theater. He is also the owner of 4 Elements Music and 8118 Music.

Reale regularly works with younger brother Willie Reale. In 2003 he was nominated for a Tony Award for A Year with Frog and Toad for Best Original Musical Score. As composer and record producer he has worked with Julie Andrews, Mel Tormé, Sid Caesar and Imogene Coca.

== Composer (Musicals) ==
- Johnny Baseball (2010 musical) (American Repertory Theater)
- The Dinosaur Musical (Arden Theatre Company (Philadelphia)) - 2005
- A Year with Frog and Toad (Broadway) - 2003
- Once Around The City (Off-Broadway) - 2001
- Quark Victory (Williamstown Theatre Festival)

== Composer (Music for plays) ==
- Rounding Third (Off-Broadway) - 2003
- Diva (Williamstown Theatre Festival)
- Salvation's Moon (Off-Broadway)

== Composer (Film) ==
- Coach of the year (2015)
- The Rebound, source music (2009), dir., Bart Freundlich
- Ten-13 (2002), dir., Carl Stillitano
- The Victim (2002), (Patti LuPone, David Strathairn), dir., Doug Magee
- Passing Over (1996), dir., Chris Ceraso
- Wigstock: The Movie (1995), dir., Barry Shills
- Dealers Among Dealers (1995), (P.O.V. on PBS) dir., Gaylen Ross
- The Rain Before The Wind (1993), BRNO 16 Audience Award, dir., Brian Heffron

== Composer (TV) ==
- On Assignment, theme
- People's List, theme
- Billions, YumTime (2016), dir., Scott Hornbacher
- Brooklyn Nine-Nine
- Legit (2013 TV series)
- Good Morning America
- Best in Film: The Greatest Movies of Our Time
- The Nate Berkus Show
- Cycling High: Doping to Win
- Unraveled
- Skywire Live
- Four Weddings
- The Presidents' Gatekeepers
- Back to the Beginning
- Hate In America
- The Making of Trump
- The Lookout
- A Toast to 2014!
- Thank You, America! with Robin Roberts
- The Making of Peter Pan Live!
- The Making of The Sound of Music Live!
- ABC News Nightline (Prime Nightline)
- Motive for Murder (TV Movie)
- Shark Tank: Swimming with Sharks
- Blue Bloods
- Katie (talk show)
- Countdown to the Oscars: 15 Movies that Changed American Cinema
- Oscars Opening Ceremony: Live from the Red Carpet
- Disappeared
- Save My Life: Boston Trauma
- American Scandals
- 7 New Signs of the Apocalypse
- Beyond the Headlines
- Haskett's Chance, Pilot (2006), dir., Tim Blake Nelson
- Primetime (U.S. TV program)
- 20/20
- Inside Edition
- Caught on Camera
- Caught on Camera with Nick Cannon
- Caught on Camera: Terror in Boston
- Mugshots
- Crime Stories
- The System
- The Piranha and the Mailman
- Case Closed
- Beating The Rap
- The Royals: Dynasty Or Disaster?
- Out There (Theme)
- Invent This! (Theme)
