= Bill Buckner's 1986 World Series error =

Baseball play

Game 6 of the 1986 World Series
Boston Red Sox	New York Mets
5	6
	1	2	3	4	5	6	7	8	9	10	R	H	E
Boston Red Sox	1	1	0	0	0	0	1	0	0	2	5	13	3
New York Mets	0	0	0	0	2	0	0	1	0	3	6	8	2
- Date: October 25, 1986
- Venue: Shea Stadium
- City: Queens, New York
- Managers: John McNamara (Boston Red Sox); Davey Johnson (New York Mets)
- Umpires: John Kibler (NL), Jim Evans (AL), Harry Wendelstedt (NL), Joe Brinkman (AL), Ed Montague (NL), Dale Ford (AL)
- Attendance: 55,078
- Time of game: 8:25 p.m. EST
- Television: NBC
- TV announcers: Vin Scully and Joe Garagiola
- Radio: CBS; WHN (New York); WPLM (Boston)
- Radio announcers: Jack Buck and Sparky Anderson (CBS); Bob Murphy and Gary Thorne (WHN); Ken Coleman and Joe Castiglione (WPLM)

In the bottom of the tenth inning of Game 6 of the 1986 World Series at Shea Stadium in Flushing, Queens, New York on October 25, 1986, Boston Red Sox first baseman Bill Buckner made a fielding error that resulted in the New York Mets winning the game; it remains one of the most memorable plays in baseball history.

With the Red Sox leading the best-of-seven series three games to two but having allowed the Mets to tie the game with two runs in the bottom of the tenth, with two outs and a runner on second base, New York's Mookie Wilson hit a seemingly routine ground ball along the first base foul line that Buckner, known to be playing through injury, was unable to field. The ball rolled between Buckner's legs and into right field, allowing the Mets' Ray Knight to come around from second to score the winning run. The win tied the series at three games each; New York completed another come-from-behind victory in Game 7 to win the championship.

Despite other mitigating factors—such as that the speedy Wilson may have been safe at first even if Buckner had fielded the ball (although this would not have allowed the winning run to score from second), or that Boston's pitching had already squandered a two-run lead and that Buckner making the play would have merely prolonged the game and not clinched victory for Boston—the play is often known as the "Buckner play" and the loss blamed on the play's eponymous figure. The play was long considered part of the Curse of the Bambino that kept the Red Sox from winning the World Series, and it led to years of fan anger and public mockery that Buckner handled graciously before being embraced by Red Sox fans again after their 2004 World Series victory. Buckner himself, though having played a lengthy 21-season career in Major League Baseball and amassing over 2,700 hits, remains most remembered for his error in the minds of many.

== Background ==
The Boston Red Sox entered the 1986 season having not won the World Series in 68 years, this following a period of being a formidable power in the early 20th century. Their misfortunes during this stretch were sometimes attributed to a curse on the Red Sox, later colloquially known as the Curse of the Bambino, that supposedly prevented Boston from winning another World Series due to their infamous dealing of Babe Ruth to the Yankees in 1920. In 1986, it appeared that the Boston Red Sox's fortunes could change. The team's hitting and offense had remained strong with Buckner, Dwight Evans, Don Baylor, and future Hall of Famers Jim Rice and Wade Boggs, who would win 5 batting titles. Roger Clemens led the pitching staff, going 24–4 with a 2.48 ERA to win both the American League Cy Young and Most Valuable Player awards. Clemens became the first starting pitcher to win both awards since Vida Blue in 1971. (This feat has been replicated twice since then by Justin Verlander in 2011 and Clayton Kershaw in 2014). The Red Sox took over first place in the AL East in the middle of May and did not relinquish it, ultimately winning the division, for the first time in 11 seasons, by 5^{1}/_{2} games over their rival New York Yankees.

Before the 1986 New York Mets season, Nelson Doubleday Jr. sold his publishing company to the (then) West German multinational corporation Bertelsmann AG, and used the proceeds from the sale to buy the Mets in his own name for $81 million. He then sold a half-stake to Fred Wilpon, making them equal partners in the team. Unlike the league champion Mets of 1969 (who went on to win the Mets' only World Series title to that point) or 1973, the 1986 Mets hit the ground running, breaking away from the rest of the division early and dominating throughout the entire year. They won 20 of their first 24 games, clinched the East Division title on September 17, and finished the year 108–54, which tied with the 1975 Cincinnati Reds for the third highest win total in National League history, behind the 1906 Chicago Cubs (116) and the 1909 Pittsburgh Pirates (110).

In 1986, 36-year-old Bill Buckner was in his 16th full season and 18th overall in the major leagues. He first appeared in 1969 for the Los Angeles Dodgers, playing for them until being traded to the Chicago Cubs before the 1977 season, and playing there until being traded to the Red Sox during the 1984 season. Over his career, he had batted over .300 in seven different seasons, won the batting title in 1980, led the league in doubles twice, was an All-Star in 1981 and finished in the top 10 of MVP voting in 1981 and 1982. After the 1986 regular season, he had accumulated over 2400 hits in his career to that point.

During the 1985 season, Buckner started all 162 games and shattered his own big league record with 184 assists. Offensively, he batted .299, with 16 home runs and 110 runs batted in. His average dropped to .267 in 1986, but he still homered a career-high 18 times and drove in 102 runs. Toward the end of the season, the aging Buckner was hobbled by injuries to both of his ankles, but missed only nine games in the regular season. Prior to the 1986 postseason, he appeared in the postseason only one other time, as a Dodger in 1974, where they won the National League Championship Series before losing to the Oakland Athletics in the World Series. Appearing as a left fielder in 9 games, he hit .211 with a home run and did not make a defensive error.

=== Postseason ===
In the National League Championship Series, the Mets faced the Houston Astros, who had yet to win a pennant. After splitting the first two games, the Mets won three of the next four, all by one run, courtesy of a ninth-inning Lenny Dykstra two-run walk-off homer in Game 3, a 12th-inning Gary Carter walk-off RBI single in Game 5, and a 16-inning marathon Game 6 win in Houston after having entered the ninth inning down 3–0. The Mets clinched the National League pennant and earned their third World Series appearance, their first since 1973; the sixteen-inning clinching victory was the longest postseason game in terms of innings at the time (fifth-longest as of 2025).

The Red Sox faced the California Angels, who were also looking for their first pennant victory, in the American League Championship Series. The teams split the first two games in Boston, but the Angels won the next two games at their home stadium to take a 3–1 series lead. California then took a 5–2 lead entering the ninth inning of Game 5, needing just three outs to advance to its first ever World Series. In the top of the ninth, Buckner led off with a single, and a subsequent two-run homer by Don Baylor cut the lead to one, but the Angels got two outs in the inning, and the Red Sox still found themselves trailing by a run with a runner on base. With Boston just one strike away from elimination, Red Sox outfielder Dave Henderson hit a two-run home run off Donnie Moore to put Boston up 6–5 (ironically, in another infamous postseason baseball moment that was largely blamed on a single player in Moore). Although the Angels tied the game in the bottom of the ninth, the Red Sox won in the 11th on a Henderson sacrifice fly off Moore. The Red Sox then won easily at Fenway Park in Games 6 and 7 by a combined 13 runs to win the American League title and advance to their first World Series since 1975.

Buckner was 6-for-28 batting (.214) in the series and hit safely in each of the last four games, and did not make an error in the field. In all four wins, for defensive purposes he was swapped out during the game for the younger Dave Stapleton; Stapleton pinch-ran for Buckner three of those times.

== The setup ==
=== Games 1–5 ===
The Red Sox surprisingly won the first two games on the road over the heavily favored Mets by scores of 1–0 and 9–3, only to surrender the next two games to the Mets at home, 7–1 and 6–2. In Game 5, Boston scored four runs off New York starter Dwight Gooden and held on for a 4–2 victory to take a 3–2 series lead, with the series heading back to New York for Game 6 and a potential Game 7.

Buckner struggled to a 4-for-23 (.174) mark at the plate through the first five games, but hit safely in the first two games to extend his postseason hitting streak to six, and also recorded a hit in the Game 5 win. In each of the three Red Sox wins, as in the prior series, Stapleton was used as a late-inning defensive replacement for Buckner, though Buckner did not commit an error in any of the first five games.

=== Game 6 ===
Boston scored one run in each of the first two innings of Game 6, but New York scored two in the fifth to tie it. In the seventh, Boston's Marty Barrett scored on an RBI groundout from Dwight Evans in an inning that was aided by a Buckner groundout to advance Barrett and an error by Mets third baseman Ray Knight. The Red Sox missed further opportunities to score however, with a runner getting thrown out at the plate to end the seventh inning and Buckner himself flying out with bases loaded and two outs in the eighth. After Red Sox manager John McNamara controversially removed starting pitcher Roger Clemens for reliever Calvin Schiraldi entering the eighth, the Mets answered with a bases loaded sacrifice fly. With the score tied at 3 going into the bottom of the ninth, the Mets' first two batters reached base (one via an error by Boston catcher Rich Gedman) but they did not score, and the game went into extra innings.

Boston's Dave Henderson led off the top of the tenth inning with a home run to give the Red Sox a one-run lead. Despite another questionable move by McNamara in allowing relief pitcher Schiraldi to bat instead of using a pinch hitter, which led to an out, Boston scored again on a two-out double by Wade Boggs and single by Barrett, making the score 5–3. Buckner followed and was hit by a pitch on his hip, but despite this, he was not pinch-ran for by Stapleton, nor was he replaced in the field in the bottom half of the inning. The next batter, Jim Rice, flied out to right to end the Red Sox half of the inning. Buckner finished 0-for-5 in Game 6, only reaching on the aforementioned hit-by-pitch.

McNamara chose to have Buckner take the field in the bottom of the inning, despite having pulled him for Stapleton in all seven previous Red Sox wins in the postseason. Schiraldi retired the first two batters, Wally Backman and Keith Hernandez, to bring Boston within an out of its first World Series win since 1918. After the second out, the scoreboard in Shea Stadium accidentally and briefly displayed "Congratulations Boston Red Sox, 1986 World Champions".

Schiraldi then surrendered singles to Gary Carter and pinch-hitter Kevin Mitchell, bringing the potential winning run to the plate in Ray Knight. After Knight started his at-bat with an 0–2 count, he hit a third consecutive single, driving in Carter to make the score 5–4 and moving Mitchell, the tying run, to third. McNamara replaced Schiraldi with closer Bob Stanley to face Mookie Wilson, who was hitting only .184 in the postseason. On the seventh pitch of the at-bat, with the count 2–2 and the Red Sox again one strike away from becoming champions, Stanley threw a wild pitch that nearly hit Wilson; Wilson leapt out of the way and the ball went all the way to the backstop, scoring Mitchell to tie the game at 5, and moving Knight, the winning run, to second.

=== The play ===
Three pitches later, on the tenth pitch of the at-bat, Wilson reached out and hit a slow roller very close to the first base line, that took one big bounce before the heavy topspin caused it to skip much closer to the ground. Buckner was playing near the line but still had to move several steps over to his left in an attempt to field the ball. Approaching the ball as he was still moving to his left, and perhaps aware of Wilson's speed and trying to hurry the play, the ball rolled beside his glove, through his legs, and into right field. Knight easily scored the winning run from second base, visibly incredulous as he crossed home plate. The final score was 6–5 in favor of the Mets.

Had Buckner fielded the ball but not in time to get Wilson at first, the score likely would have remained tied for the next Mets batter, Howard Johnson, with runners on first and third. Had Buckner fielded the ball and then put out Wilson at first base – either by himself or by throwing to a covering Stanley – Game 6 would have gone to an 11th inning.

== The calls ==
=== Jack Buck ===
The national radio coverage of the 1986 World Series was handled by CBS Radio Sports with Jack Buck calling the play-by-play alongside then Detroit Tigers manager Sparky Anderson. The following is a word-for-word transcript of Buck and Anderson's commentary during the final moments of Game 6:

Jack Buck: Wild pitch. Here's the pitch to Mookie Wilson. Winning run at second. Ground ball to first, it is a run—an ERROR! AN ERROR BY BUCKNER! The winning run scores! The Mets win it 6–5 with three in the tenth! The ball went right through the legs of Buckner and the Mets with two men out and nobody on have scored three times to bring about a seventh game, which will be played here tomorrow night. Folks, it was unbelievable. An error, right through the legs of Buckner. There were two on, nobody out, a single by Carter, a single by Mitchell, a single by Ray Knight, a wild pitch, an error by Buckner. Three in the ninth for the Mets. They've won the game 6–5 and we shall play here... tomorrow night! Well, open up the history book, folks, we've got an entry for you... What do you think, Sparky?

Sparky Anderson: I never seen nothing like it. Here you got two out, two run lead, you figure Carter up, he can't even hurt you. He gets a base hit, another base hit, another base hit...wild pitches, ball rolls through the guys legs. I've never seen nothing like it, Jack.

=== Ken Coleman ===
Locally in Boston, radio coverage of the 1986 World Series was broadcast on WPLM with Ken Coleman and Joe Castiglione on the call.

Coleman: Knight at second. Three and two. The pitch... ground ball to first base. Buckner... it goes by him! And here comes...the winning run! The Mets have won it...6 to 5 on a ground ball to Buckner...that went through him...for what has to be an error! And Knight comes home. And the Mets are still alive! They are going wild in New York! As the New York Mets after the Red Sox in the top of the 10th inning, got two with two men out and nobody on...come back and get three and win it....win it...6 to 5 to force Game 7 tomorrow night. Game 7 tomorrow night! And we'll be back with a recap...in a moment.

=== Bob Murphy ===
Locally in New York, radio coverage the 1986 World Series was broadcast on WHN with Bob Murphy and Gary Thorne on the call.

Murphy: A slow ground ball went right through the legs of Buckner down the right field line. The Mets have won the ballgame. Three runs in the bottom half of the 10th inning. Three runs in the 10th inning. They were down to their final strike twice in the bottom half of the 10th inning, they win the ballgame. I thought the ground ball was going to be foul, it stayed fair. It went right through the legs of Billy Buckner and down the right field line.

Thorne: Bob, what is Billy Buckner doing in the game in the bottom of the 10th inning?

=== Vin Scully ===
The 1986 World Series was televised by NBC with Vin Scully on the call alongside Joe Garagiola. Scully's call of the final play in Game 6 of the 1986 World Series would quickly become an iconic one to baseball fans, with the normally calm Scully growing increasingly excited:

So the winning run is at second base, with two outs, three and two to Mookie Wilson. [A] little roller up along first... BEHIND THE BAG! IT GETS THROUGH BUCKNER! Here comes Knight, and the Mets win it!

Scully then remained silent for more than three minutes, letting the pictures and the crowd noise tell the story. Scully resumed with

If one picture is worth a thousand words, you have seen about a million words, but more than that, you have seen an absolutely bizarre finish to Game 6 of the 1986 World Series. The Mets are not only alive, they are well; and they will play the Red Sox in Game 7 tomorrow!

After the top of the tenth, NBC began setting up in the visiting clubhouse for what they believed was the inevitable postgame victory celebration by the Boston Red Sox. The Commissioner's Trophy had been brought into the Red Sox clubhouse along with several bottles of champagne, and Bob Costas was to preside over the presentation. However, after Bob Stanley's wild pitch in the bottom of the tenth, everything was quickly struck and removed from the room before the Red Sox returned. Costas later recalled the removal of all the equipment for the postgame celebration as being "like a scene change in a Broadway musical. In, out, gone, not a trace." Before the wild pitch, Costas had asked NBC Sports producer Michael Weisman in his ear what to do if the Mets tied the game, to which Weisman had replied, "Get your ass out of there as fast as you possibly can." However, Costas remained in the clubhouse with a skeletal crew until Buckner's error ended the game.

== Aftermath ==
=== Game 7 ===
After a rainstorm postponed Game 7 by a day, Boston took a 3–0 lead on Mets starter Ron Darling in the second inning via solo homers by Evans and Gedman, and an RBI single by Boggs. Boston held that margin heading into the bottom of the sixth inning when New York rallied again, scoring three runs off starter Bruce Hurst to tie the game on three hits, a walk, and an unusual force out from the outfield after a Mets runner had confusion on whether the ball was caught or not. The play may have saved the Red Sox a run in that inning, but in the next inning Schiraldi entered and faltered again, allowing a leadoff home run and two more runs to give the Mets a 6–3 lead.

Buckner led off the eighth inning with a single – Boston's first baserunner since the fourth inning – as part of a 2-for-4 performance. He came around to score on a two-RBI double by Evans to make the score 6–5. However, the Mets stranded Boston's would-be tying run on second, and proceeded to score two runs of their own in the eighth on a home run by Darryl Strawberry and a surprising RBI single from relief pitcher Jesse Orosco. Orosco retired Boston in order in the ninth to give the Mets their second and, as of 2026, their most recent World Series championship.

Mets pitcher Jesse Orosco ended the game by striking out Marty Barrett. Orosco then threw his glove high in the air and dropped to his knees while catcher Gary Carter ran to the mound to embrace him. This scene was captured on film and would become an iconic image, taken by Mets photographer George Kalinsky, in Mets baseball history and in all of baseball. The Mets remained the only team to come within one strike of losing a World Series before recovering to become World Champions, until the St. Louis Cardinals did it in 2011. The Mets winning this World Series is the highest-rated single World Series game to date. The Mets were also the first team to win a World Series in a potential clinching game delayed by rain, as Game 7 was postponed by one day.

=== Curses ===
Regardless of any of the other perceived shortcomings that led to Boston's loss in the 1986 World Series, Buckner's error epitomized the "Curse of the Bambino" in the minds of Red Sox fans, and he soon became the scapegoat for a frustrated fan base.

While not falling under the curse in the traditional sense, Buckner's infamous gaffe in Game 6 of the 1986 World Series can also be interpreted to fit the Ex-Cubs Factor and/or the Curse of the Billy Goat. Upon video analysis, Buckner, a former Chicago Cub for seven seasons, was shown to be wearing a Cubs batting glove under his mitt when he made the error.

=== Buckner, the Red Sox, and the Mets beyond 1986 ===
Buckner began receiving death threats and was heckled and booed by some of his own home fans, often with the false belief or implication that his play alone could have instantly won the series for the Red Sox. Meanwhile, he was the focal point of derision from the fans of opposing teams on the road—especially when he faced the Mets in spring training of 1987—and during his first regular-season at bat at Yankee Stadium. He recorded his 2,500th career hit on May 19, an RBI single in a 4–1 road loss to the Kansas City Royals, but the Red Sox released Buckner on July 23 after he recorded a .273 batting average, 2 home runs, and 42 RBI in 75 games.

After spending his last few seasons with the California Angels, Kansas City Royals, and the Red Sox, Buckner became the 21st player in MLB history to play in four decades. He ended his career with 2,715 hits and 498 doubles, having batted over .300 seven times. Buckner led his league in assists four times, with his 1985 mark remaining the American League (AL) record. He retired with the fourth-most assists by a first baseman (1,351) in major league history despite not playing the position regularly until he was 27 years old. After retiring as a player, Buckner became a real estate developer in Idaho. He coached a number of Minor League Baseball (MiLB) teams before leaving baseball in 2014.

The Red Sox returned to the postseason in 1988. With the club in fourth place midway through the 1988 season at the All-Star break, manager John McNamara was fired and replaced by Joe Morgan on July 15. Immediately the club won 12 games in a row, and 19 of 20 overall, to surge to the AL East title in what would be referred to as Morgan Magic. But the magic was short-lived, as the team was swept by the Oakland Athletics in the ALCS. Ironically, the MVP of that Series was former Red Sox pitcher and Baseball Hall of Fame player Dennis Eckersley, who saved all four wins for Oakland.

While the 1986 Mets were undeniably strong, they also gained infamy for off-the-field controversy. Both Strawberry and Gooden were youngsters who wound up burning out long before their time because of various substance abuse and personal problems. Hernandez's cocaine abuse was the subject of persistent rumors even before he joined the Mets, but he publicly acknowledged his addiction in 1985 and made a successful recovery. Lenny Dykstra's reputation was recently tainted by allegations of steroid use and gambling problems. Instead of putting together a winning dynasty, the problems caused the Mets to soon fall apart. Despite Darryl Strawberry's numerous off-the-field mishaps, he remained the Mets' all-time leader in home runs until 2025 when passed by Pete Alonso.

This World Series championship by the Mets had a strange twist: Lou Gorman, the general manager of the Red Sox, was vice president, player personnel, of the Mets from 1980 to 1983. Working under Mets GM Frank Cashen, with whom Gorman served with the Orioles, he helped lay the foundation for the Mets' championship.

=== References in popular culture ===
Charlie Sheen purchased the "Buckner Ball" at auction in 1992 for $93,000, and for a long time, it resided in the collection of songwriter Seth Swirsky, who refers to it as the "Mookie Ball". The ball was on loan for a time from Swirsky to the Mets to display in their Mets Hall of Fame and Museum, and it was among the most popular artifacts for fans to see. On May 3, 2012, Swirsky sold the ball through Heritage Auctions for $418,250.

Buckner made a cameo appearance at the beginning of the sports parody film The Comebacks and was featured in an episode of the HBO series Curb Your Enthusiasm, in which he redeems himself by catching a baby thrown from a burning building. Also, he made a cameo appearance in the pilot episode of the short-lived sitcom Inside Schwartz, advising the title character to "just let it go." In 1995, Buckner appeared along with Michael Jordan, Stan Musial, Willie Mays and Ken Griffey Jr. in a commercial for the shoemaker Nike in which Spike Lee, in character as Mars Blackmon, compares Jordan's baseball skills to Musial, Mays, Griffey and Buckner. The punch line is a visual reference to Buckner's 1986 World Series error. His famous 1986 World Series miscue is also referenced in the films Celtic Pride, Rounders, and Fever Pitch. The play also is referenced in an episode of The Simpsons titled "Brother's Little Helper" and in the musical Johnny Baseball. On October 23, 2008, during former Federal Reserve chairman Alan Greenspan's testimony in House hearings on the 2008 financial crisis, Representative John Yarmuth referred to Greenspan as one of "three Bill Buckners". Buckner and Mookie Wilson appeared in an MLB Network commercial for the 2016 postseason, "Catching Up", marking the 30th anniversary of the 1986 World Series and their roles in it.

Buckner is mentioned in The Areas of My Expertise in a series of New England sports references. In the book, John Hodgman describes a (fictional) radio personality and recounts the premonition she had regarding Buckner's infamous error in Game 6 of the 1986 World Series.

The Leonard P. Zakim Bunker Hill Memorial Bridge, in Boston, is colloquially referred to by locals as the Bill Buckner Bridge because traffic goes between the "legs" of the bridge, like Buckner's 1986 World Series fielding error. The nickname is now spoken fondly, since Buckner and Sox fans thought fondly of each other after the 2004 World Series win.

In Rizzoli & Isles episode "Cuts Like a Knife", Jane Rizzoli says that she wanted to marry Buckner as a child, until the error occurred.

== Similar plays ==
Leon Durham is himself widely remembered for an error that he made at first base during the 1984 National League Championship Series. In the bottom of the seventh inning in the decisive fifth game between Durham's Chicago Cubs and the San Diego Padres, the Padres sent pinch-hitter Tim Flannery to face the Cubs' ace pitcher Rick Sutcliffe. (Coincidentally, Buckner was previously a member of the 1984 Chicago Cubs but was traded to the Red Sox mid-season.)

Through the top of the sixth inning, the Cubs had a 3–0 lead, aided by Durham's home run off Eric Show in the first inning. In the bottom of the sixth inning, the Padres cut the Cubs' lead to 3–2 with a pair of singles by Alan Wiggins and Tony Gwynn, a walk to Steve Garvey, and sacrifice flies by Graig Nettles and Terry Kennedy. The bottom of the seventh inning kicked off with Carmelo Martínez walking on four pitches from Sutcliffe. Garry Templeton then sacrificed Martínez to second, setting things up for Tim Flannery. Martinez would then score when Flannery hit a sharp grounder that trickled through Leon Durham's legs for an error.

The error became known as the "Gatorade Glove Play" because before taking his position in the field that inning, Gatorade was spilled on Durham's glove. Some Cub fans believe the Gatorade spilled on Durham's glove amounted to a curse, similar to the goat and Bartman curses of Cub lore.

The play would also turn out to be very similar, in style and effect, to Bill Buckner's much-discussed error in the 1986 World Series. The coincidental connection between these two events is that Durham had been moved from the outfield to first base during the 1984 season, replacing Buckner after the Cubs traded him to the Boston Red Sox for pitcher Dennis Eckersley. Buckner's error, like Durham's, would be seen as turning a post-season series around. The same joke even circulated for both incidents: That they had been despondent, jumped in front of a moving truck, and "the truck went between their legs".

The Padres wound up winning the game 6–3 to reach the World Series for the first time ever. The Cubs had won the first 2 games of the series (1984 marked the last time that the League Championship Series was a best-of-five series) over the Padres. Incidentally, Durham went 3-for-20 in the NLCS, garnering two of his three hits in the final two games on home runs (his shot in Game 4 had given the Cubs a 3–2 lead).
