= Ex-Cubs Factor =

Superstition in American baseball

The Chicago Cubs' logo.

The Ex-Cub Factor is a seemingly spurious correlation that was seen as essentially a corollary to the Curse of the Billy Goat. Widely published in the 1990s, the hypothesis asserted that since the appearance by the Chicago Cubs in the 1945 World Series, any baseball team headed into the World Series with three or more former Cubs on its roster has "a critical mass of Cubness" and a strong likelihood of failure.

== Ex-Cubs Factor hypothesis ==
It is utterly impossible for a team with three or more ex-Cubs to win the World Series

— Ron Berler's ex-Cubs Factor hypothesis

The theory was developed in October 15, 1981 by Ron Berler, a freelance journalist and Cubs fan. Berler posited in an article that "it is utterly impossible for a team with three or more ex-Cubs to win the series." Berler based this on a pattern that he observed in the post-1945 era; 1945 being the last time the Chicago Cubs made it to a World Series until 2016.

Berler cited many examples of teams with three or more ex-Cubs on their teams that reached the World Series and lost: including the 1958 Milwaukee Braves, the 1966 Los Angeles Dodgers, and the 1978 Los Angeles Dodgers. The 1978 Dodgers, according to Berler, had lost the 1977 World Series with three ex-Cubs on their roster and seemed to be doing well the next season when they traded away one of those ex-Cubs, Mike Garman, and began playing excellently. However, four weeks later, the Dodgers traded for ex-Cub Bill North and, in the words of Berler, the "team suffered an immediate tailspin and barely beat Cincinnati to the pennant" (North was actually traded to the Dodgers first on May 17, and Garman was traded away three days later). The 1978 Dodgers lost the World Series to the Yankees, leading to Berler's hypothesis of three ex-Cubs making it impossible to win a championship. In addition, the 1980 Kansas City Royals lost the World Series with three former Cubs.

In the original article, Berler predicted that based on this pattern the 1981 New York Yankees would not win the World Series because they had five ex-Cubs on their roster: Oscar Gamble, Bobby Murcer, Dave LaRoche, Rick Reuschel, and Barry Foote. This prediction went against the odds which heavily favored the Yankees at the time. His prediction about the 1981 World Series based on this hypothesis was proved correct with the Yankees losing to the Dodgers, four games to two.

=== Explanation of the relationship ===
Berler relates the relationship to the inherent "cubness" that ex-Cubs take to their future teams. In the original article, he wrote that "the ballclub possesses eerie, bewitching powers over its players" and that "'Cubness'...is synonymous with the rankest sort of abject failure, and is a condition chronic among all Cubs, past and present."

Mike Royko, who popularized the term in his columns in Chicago, wrote that Cubness was a "virus" where "Three or more ex-Cubs could infect an entire team with the will to lose, no matter how skillful that team might appear." Berler adopted a similar explanation in later articulations, writing that the virus "attacks all who've played for the Cubs, even if only for a single day. There is no inoculation, no cure. When traded to another team, ex-Cubs become carriers of this debilitating disease—the ticks of baseball. Any World Series team infested with three or more of them turns addled and confused, losing all ability to win."

=== Modified Ex-Cub Factor ===
A team with no ex-Cubs probably has the edge on a team that has even one in the World Series

— Mike Royko's Modified ex-Cubs Factor hypothesis

Mike Royko developed an additional hypothesis contending that "A team with no ex-Cubs probably has the edge on a team that has even one." The key evidence provided for this was the 1986 World Series which had the New York Mets, with no ex-Cubs, defeat the Boston Red Sox, who had ex-Cub Bill Buckner who made a dramatic error. This hypothesis was largely discredited in the 2003 World Series when the Florida Marlins, who had ex-Cub Lenny Harris, defeated the New York Yankees, who had no ex-Cubs. However, Harris did not play in the World Series.

== Cases for the Ex-Cubs Factor hypothesis ==
World Series where the Ex-Cubs Factor has been cited (Note: Negative cases in blue)
| Year | Winning Team (# of ex-Cubs) | Losing Team (# of ex-Cubs) |
|---|---|---|
| 1981 | Los Angeles Dodgers (1) | New York Yankees (5) |
| 1984 | Detroit Tigers (1) | San Diego Padres (3) |
| 1990 | Cincinnati Reds (1) | Oakland Athletics (3) |
| 2001 | Arizona Diamondbacks (4) | New York Yankees (2) |
| 2002 | Los Angeles Angels (1) | San Francisco Giants (3) |
| 2004 | Boston Red Sox (2) | St. Louis Cardinals (3) |
| 2008 | Philadelphia Phillies (3) | Tampa Bay Rays (1) |
| 2009 | New York Yankees (2) | Philadelphia Phillies (3) |
| 2012 | San Francisco Giants (3) | Detroit Tigers (0) |
| 2019 | Washington Nationals (1) | Houston Astros (3) |
| 2022 | Houston Astros (1) | Philadelphia Phillies (3) |
| 2024 | Los Angeles Dodgers (0) | New York Yankees (3) |

Since 1945, of the 25 teams to reach the World Series with three or more Cubs players, only 4 have won the World Series (the 1960 Pirates, the 2001 Diamondbacks, the 2008 Phillies, and the 2012 Giants). Since its articulation in 1981, the Ex-Cubs Factor has been used to predict and explain post-season and World Series defeats for many different baseball teams.

During the 1980s, the ex-Cubs factor was used to explain a number of losses by teams. It was used, in a letter to the editor, as a reason for the loss by the 1984 San Diego Padres (who ironically beat the Cubs to get to the Series) in the 1984 World Series (with three ex-Cubs) and by the collapse of the 1985 Toronto Blue Jays who had added ex-Cub Cliff Johnson on August 28 and went on to blow a 3–1 lead over the Royals in the 1985 American League Championship Series.

While not falling under the curse in the traditional sense, Bill Buckner's infamous gaffe in Game 6 of the 1986 World Series can be interpreted to fit the Ex-Cubs Factor. Buckner, a former Cub, booted a ground ball hit by New York Mets batter Mookie Wilson, allowing Ray Knight to come around and score the winning run. The Mets would go on to win the series in seven games, and Buckner would never win the World Series in his career. Upon video analysis, Buckner was shown to be wearing a Cubs batting glove under his mitt when he made the error.

The theory became more prominent in 1990 when it was popularized by syndicated Chicago Tribune columnist Mike Royko and continued predictions by Ron Berler. On October 16, 1990, Berler again asserted the ex-Cubs factor as the reason that the favored Oakland Athletics, with ex-Cubs Scott Sanderson, Dennis Eckersley, and Ron Hassey, would lose the 1990 World Series (which they did by getting swept by the Cincinnati Reds). Berler cited it again as a reason for the defeat of the league-leading 1991 Pittsburgh Pirates in the 1991 National League Championship Series to the Atlanta Braves. Mike Royko used the ex-Cubs factor to predict the playoff collapse of the 104-win 1993 Atlanta Braves (which did occur in the 1993 National League Championship Series).

The ex-Cubs factor hypothesis was used to predict the loss of the San Francisco Giants (with three ex-Cubs Shawon Dunston, Benito Santiago and Tim Worrell) to the Anaheim Angels in the 2002 World Series.

The ex-Cubs factor hypothesis has also been used to explain the results of the 2004 American League Championship Series (ALCS) and the 2004 World Series, both won by the Boston Red Sox. In the 2004 ALCS, the Yankees, who had six ex-Cubs, squandered a three-game series lead to the Boston Red Sox, the first time in Major League Baseball history. The Red Sox, with only two ex-Cubs, then went on to defeat the St. Louis Cardinals, with three ex-Cubs, in the World Series. The 2009 World Series resulted in a win by the New York Yankees, with two ex-Cubs, over the Philadelphia Phillies, with three ex-Cubs.

== Cases against the Ex-Cubs Factor hypothesis ==
Berler's study of the ex-Cub factor since 1945 revealed only one exception since 1945: the 1960 Pittsburgh Pirates, who won the World Series with three ex-Cubs on their roster. Berler contends that one of those ex-Cubs, Don Hoak, spent so little time in Chicago (121 games in one season), that he did not fully develop what Berler called his "Cubness". Berler quoted pitcher Jim Brosnan, a teammate of Hoak's on the 1956 Cubs, as saying that "Hoak is quite possibly the only man who ever conquered his Cubness".

The Society for American Baseball Research researched the rosters of each World Series roster from 1946 to 2013 through records and noted each Series that had at least one former Cub while noting the distinct conjectures between Berler's and Royko's theories. Perhaps predictably, the Berler rate was found to be more effective (17/22 as compared to 32/56), although there are a few evident cases against each conjecture.

Most notably, the 1973 Oakland A's had three ex-Cubs in Pat Bourque, Ken Holtzman, and Bill North all on the roster during their run to the World Series, although North did not play in the Series due to injury. This also applies to the 1979 Pittsburgh Pirates, who won the World Series with three former Cub players in Matt Alexander, Bill Madlock, and Dave Roberts, although Roberts didn't play in the Series itself.

The 2001 Arizona Diamondbacks similarly had four ex-Cubs on their roster—Miguel Batista, Mark Grace, Mike Morgan, and Luis Gonzalez—but defeated the New York Yankees in the 2001 World Series. Mark Grace declared in a post-game interview that "We beat the ex-Cub Factor!" The sympathy many fans felt for New York City following the September 11 attacks, topped off by the four ex-Cubs on the Arizona roster, seemed to stack up against the Diamondbacks. But Arizona won Game 6 in a lopsided score, and then won Game 7 in a come-from-behind finish, scoring a pair of runs in the ninth inning to win the Series. In fact, two of the four former Cubs played prominent roles in that ninth inning: Grace got a lead-off single and Gonzalez drove in the winning run with a single.

The 1960 Pittsburgh Pirates and the 2001 Arizona Diamondbacks (both with victories over the New York Yankees) are among the few instances of teams ever having won the World Series in Game 7 walk-off victories. The former was a home run hit by Bill Mazeroski to end the 1960 World Series.

The 2008 Philadelphia Phillies team was declared prior to the post-season by Berler as "doomed this year by the Ex-Cub Factor", with three ex-Cubs—Scott Eyre, Jamie Moyer, and Matt Stairs—on their roster. However, the Phillies defeated the Los Angeles Dodgers (a team also with three ex-Cubs) in the National League Championship Series and the Tampa Bay Rays (one ex-Cub) in the 2008 World Series.

== Applied to other teams ==
The Ex-Cubs Factor hypothesis has been applied to other professional baseball teams in both positive and negative references. For example, sportswriter Jeff Blair has argued there exists an "ex-Expos factor" where the number of former Montreal Expos players correlates with post-season success, owing to several careers starting in Montreal that ranged from Randy Johnson (the winning pitcher of the final game in 2001) to Pedro Martínez (part of the Red Sox team who made the epic comeback over the Yankees in 2004) to Gary Carter (who played on the Mets team that won in 1986), each of which whom won a World Series after leaving the Expos. Jim Caple for ESPN.com has similarly proposed an ex-Mariners factor (or XMF) which explores the excellent play by ex-Mariners for other teams in postseason baseball.

== See also ==
- Redskins Rule
