= Tim McCarver =

American baseball player and announcer (1941–2023)

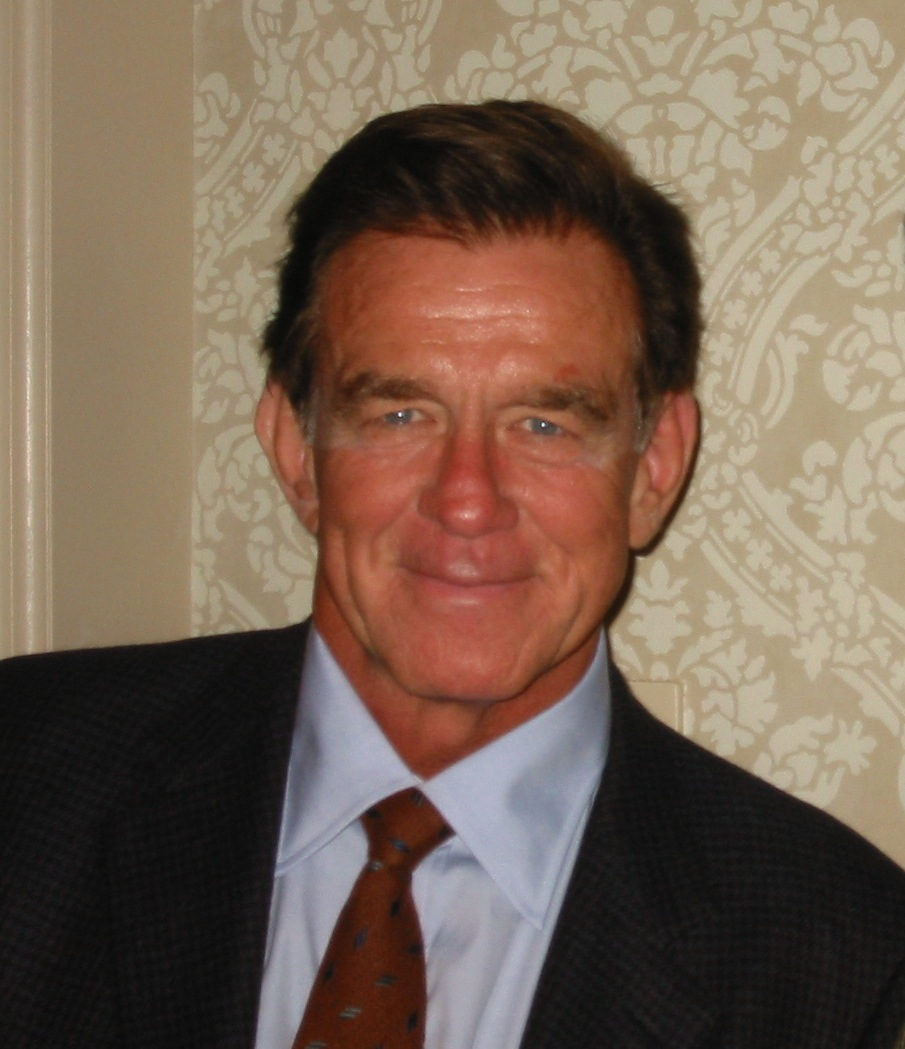
- McCarver in 2002
- Catcher
- Born: October 16, 1941; Memphis, Tennessee, U.S.
- Died: February 16, 2023 (aged 81); Memphis, Tennessee, U.S.
- Batted: Left Threw: Right

MLB debut
- September 10, 1959, for the St. Louis Cardinals

Last MLB appearance
- October 5, 1980, for the Philadelphia Phillies

MLB statistics
- Batting average: .271
- Home runs: 97
- Runs batted in: 645
- Stats at Baseball Reference

Teams
- St. Louis Cardinals (1959–1961, 1963–1969); Philadelphia Phillies (1970–1972); Montreal Expos (1972); St. Louis Cardinals (1973–1974); Boston Red Sox (1974–1975); Philadelphia Phillies (1975–1980)

Career highlights and awards
- 2× All-Star (1966, 1967); 2× World Series champion (1964, 1967); Ford C. Frick Award (2012); St. Louis Cardinals Hall of Fame

James Timothy McCarver (October 16, 1941 – February 16, 2023) was an American professional baseball catcher and television sports commentator. He played 21 seasons in Major League Baseball (MLB) for the St. Louis Cardinals, Philadelphia Phillies, Montreal Expos, and Boston Red Sox between 1959 and 1980. He was a two time all All-Star and won the World Series, both times with the Cardinals.

Born in Memphis, Tennessee, he attended Christian Brothers High School where he played both basketball and football alongside baseball. He was signed by the St. Louis Cardinals in 1959 at the age of 17. He spent the first 4 years of his career moving between MLB and MiLB league teams, before in 1963 being promoted back to the Majors where he stayed for the reminder of his career. In 1966, he became the first catcher since the 19th century to lead the National League (NL) in triples with 13. He won two World Series at St. Louis in 1964, where he batted .478 in the Series, and hit a three-run home run in the tenth inning to win Game 5 in 1967 and appeared in the All Star Game twice. McCarver was runner-up for the 1967 NL Most Valuable Player Award, behind teammate Orlando Cepeda, after batting .295 and leading NL catchers in assists and fielding percentage.

Traded to the Phillies after the 1969 season, he was re-joined by pitcher and St. Louis teammate Steve Carlton, becoming his regular catcher as the team won three division titles from 1976 to 1978. After increased use as a pinch hitter in his last several seasons, in 1980, McCarver became the 18th major league player to play in four decades.

After his playing career, McCarver became a television color commentator, most notably for Fox Sports after previous stints with the other three broadcast networks. He eventually set a record by calling 23 World Series as well as 20 All-Star Games, earning three Emmy Awards in the process. In 2012, McCarver was named the Ford C. Frick Award recipient. He was inducted into the Sports Broadcasting Hall of Fame in 2016, and the St. Louis Cardinals Hall of Fame in 2017.

== Early life ==
McCarver was born in Memphis, Tennessee to Alice (née Phelan) and Edward McCarver, the fourth of five children; he had three brothers and a sister. His father was a police lieutenant. He went to segregated schools, including Christian Brothers High School where he played baseball, basketball, and football. Reportedly, amongst the subjects in which he was well-versed were poetry, World War II and Civil War generals, show tunes, and Shakespeare.

McCarver credited his sister, Marilyn for helping him. She helped him with fielding and it was her idea for him to become a left-handed hitter.

== Playing career ==
=== Early years ===
McCarver turned down a football scholarship at the University of Tennessee to play professional baseball. Instead, he signed to a $75,000 contract by the St. Louis Cardinals in 1959 when he was 17. After playing in the minor leagues with the Keokuk Indians and the Rochester Red Wings, McCarver reached the Major Leagues for the first time at 17. He was with the Memphis Chicks for the 1960 season, the 1961 season with the Charleston Charlies, and the 1962 season with the Atlanta Crackers, receiving brief promotions to the major leagues in the 1960 and 1961 seasons. In 1963, he was promoted to the Major Leagues for good.

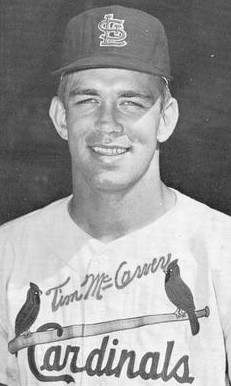
McCarver in 1965

=== St. Louis Cardinals ===
McCarver hit the tie-breaking home run in the 10th inning, winning Game 5 of the 1964 World Series for the Cardinals. In 1966, McCarver was named to the All-Star Team, scored the winning run in the 10th inning of that 1966 All-Star Game, and became the first catcher to lead the National League in triples, with 13. In 1967, he finished second to teammate Orlando Cepeda for the National League Most Valuable Player award.

McCarver was a member of two World Series champion teams in St. Louis. He was the preferred catcher of the notoriously temperamental Bob Gibson. McCarver said if he had any prejudices it was probably Gibson who helped him get past them.

During his time in St. Louis, he also fostered a relationship with young pitcher Steve Carlton that would keep him in the Major Leagues later in his career. In 1968, McCarver was the Cardinals catcher as they won the NL pennant but were ultimately defeated by the Detroit Tigers in a seven-game World Series.

=== Later career ===
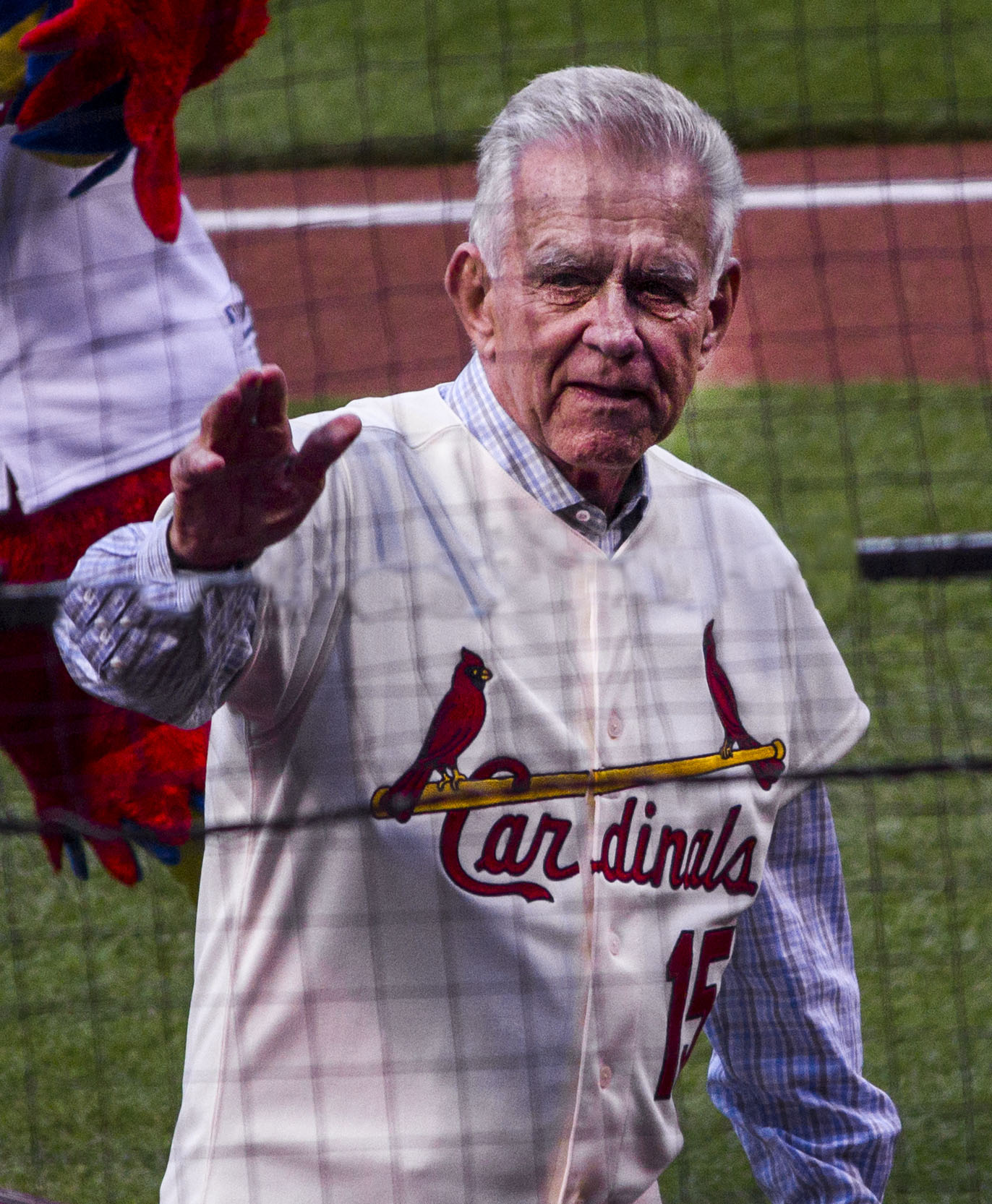
McCarver at Busch Stadium before a game in St. Louis against the Boston Red Sox, in May 2017

After the 1969 season, the Cardinals traded McCarver, Curt Flood, Joe Hoerner, and Byron Browne to the Philadelphia Phillies for Dick Allen, Cookie Rojas, and Jerry Johnson. On June 14, 1972, the Phillies traded McCarver to the Montreal Expos for John Bateman. The Expos used McCarver as an outfielder. The Cardinals re-acquired McCarver from the Expos for Jorge Roque after the 1972 season. The Boston Red Sox purchased McCarver from the Cardinals towards the end of the 1974 season. The Red Sox released McCarver in June 1975. He signed with the Phillies a week later.

During his first stint with the Phillies, McCarver caught Rick Wise's no-hitter on June 23, 1971. At the end of the season, the Phillies traded Wise to the Cardinals for Steve Carlton, reuniting McCarver with his former teammate. During the 1972 season, the Phillies traded McCarver to the Montreal Expos, where, on October 2, he caught the second of Bill Stoneman's two career no-hitters.

McCarver finished his career as Carlton's personal catcher for the Phillies in the late 1970s. He thought he was done playing baseball and made some audition tapes for Philadelphia TV stations. He retired after the 1979 season to begin a broadcasting career. He briefly returned to play in September 1980, becoming one of 31 players to appear in Major League games in four decades (1950s–1980s).

He had 121 shutouts as a catcher during his career, ranking him 9th all-time.

== Broadcasting career ==
After retiring from playing, McCarver worked in sports broadcasting as a color commentator for several decades. He won three Emmy Awards for Sports Event Analyst.

=== Local broadcasts ===
He began his broadcasting career at WPHL-TV (Channel 17) in Philadelphia, where he called Phillies games with Richie Ashburn and Harry Kalas. McCarver called games for local sports networks carrying the Phillies from 1980 to 1982, the New York Mets from 1983 to 1998, the New York Yankees from 1999 to 2001, and the San Francisco Giants in 2002.

=== National broadcasts ===
McCarver began working as a backup Game of the Week commentator for NBC in 1980. His work at NBC was followed by stints with ABC (where he teamed with Don Drysdale on backup Monday Night Baseball games in 1984 and Al Michaels and Jim Palmer from 1985 to 1989 and again from 1994 to 1995 under the "Baseball Network" umbrella) and CBS (where he teamed with Jack Buck from 1990 to 1991 and Sean McDonough from 1992 to 1993). McCarver called his first World Series in 1985 for ABC as a last-minute replacement for Howard Cosell. While at ABC, McCarver also served as a correspondent and play-by-play announcer for freestyle skiing at the 1988 Winter Olympics in Calgary, and he later co-hosted the primetime coverage of 1992 Winter Olympics with Paula Zahn for CBS.

In 1996, McCarver was paired with Joe Buck on the Fox network's MLB telecasts, a role he held from 1996 to 2013. In 2003, McCarver set a record by broadcasting his 13th World Series on national television (surpassing Curt Gowdy). He called 24 World Series for ABC, CBS, and Fox. McCarver announced in March 2013 that he would leave Fox after the 2013 season. His final Fox broadcast was October 30, 2013, as the Boston Red Sox defeated the St. Louis Cardinals in Game 6 to win the 2013 World Series.

McCarver also hosted a nationally syndicated sports interview program, The Tim McCarver Show, from 2000 until 2017.

=== Return to local broadcasting ===
In December 2013, he was hired to be a part-time analyst for the Cardinals on Fox Sports Midwest. He teamed with Dan McLaughlin to call 30 games in the 2014 season. His first game called for the Cardinals was on April 28, 2014, when they hosted the Milwaukee Brewers. McCarver returned to the Cardinals booth for 40 games in 2015 and continued to call a select number of games each year through 2019. McCarver did not work on any telecasts during the team's shortened 2020 season, due to health concerns related to the COVID-19 pandemic. In April 2022, McCarver officially announced his retirement from broadcasting.

=== Criticism ===
During the 1992 National League Championship Series, McCarver criticized Deion Sanders, who also had become an NFL star, for playing two sports—football and baseball—on the same day. For his criticism, on October 14, 1992, after Game 7 had concluded, Sanders dumped a bucket of ice water on McCarver three times while covering the National League pennant-winning Atlanta Braves' clubhouse celebration for CBS. After being doused with the water, McCarver shouted at Sanders, "You are a real man, Deion. I'll say that." Also during the 1992 post-season (when McCarver worked for CBS), Norman Chad criticized McCarver in Sports Illustrated by saying that he's someone who "when you ask him the time, will tell you how a watch works," a reference to McCarver's habit of over-analyzing.

In October 2008, just before the 2008 NLCS, McCarver made public his feelings about Manny Ramirez, calling him "despicable" and criticizing him for his sloppy, lazy play in Boston and how he had suddenly turned it around in Los Angeles. Ramirez declined to comment. In 2010, McCarver compared the New York Yankees' treatment of former manager Joe Torre to the treatment meted out by Nazi Germany and Stalinist Russia to generals who fell out of favor with their leaders. After receiving negative comments about his position on the topic, McCarver apologized.

== Film and television ==
McCarver had several baseball-themed roles in film and television, including Fever Pitch and Moneyball.

== Music career ==
On October 9, 2009, McCarver released a cover album of jazz standards entitled Tim McCarver Sings Songs from the Great American Songbook.

== Personal life ==
McCarver married his high school sweetheart, Anne, on December 29, 1964. They had two daughters, Kathy and Kelly. Tim McCarver died of heart failure in Memphis, on February 16, 2023, at the age of 81.

== Awards and honors ==
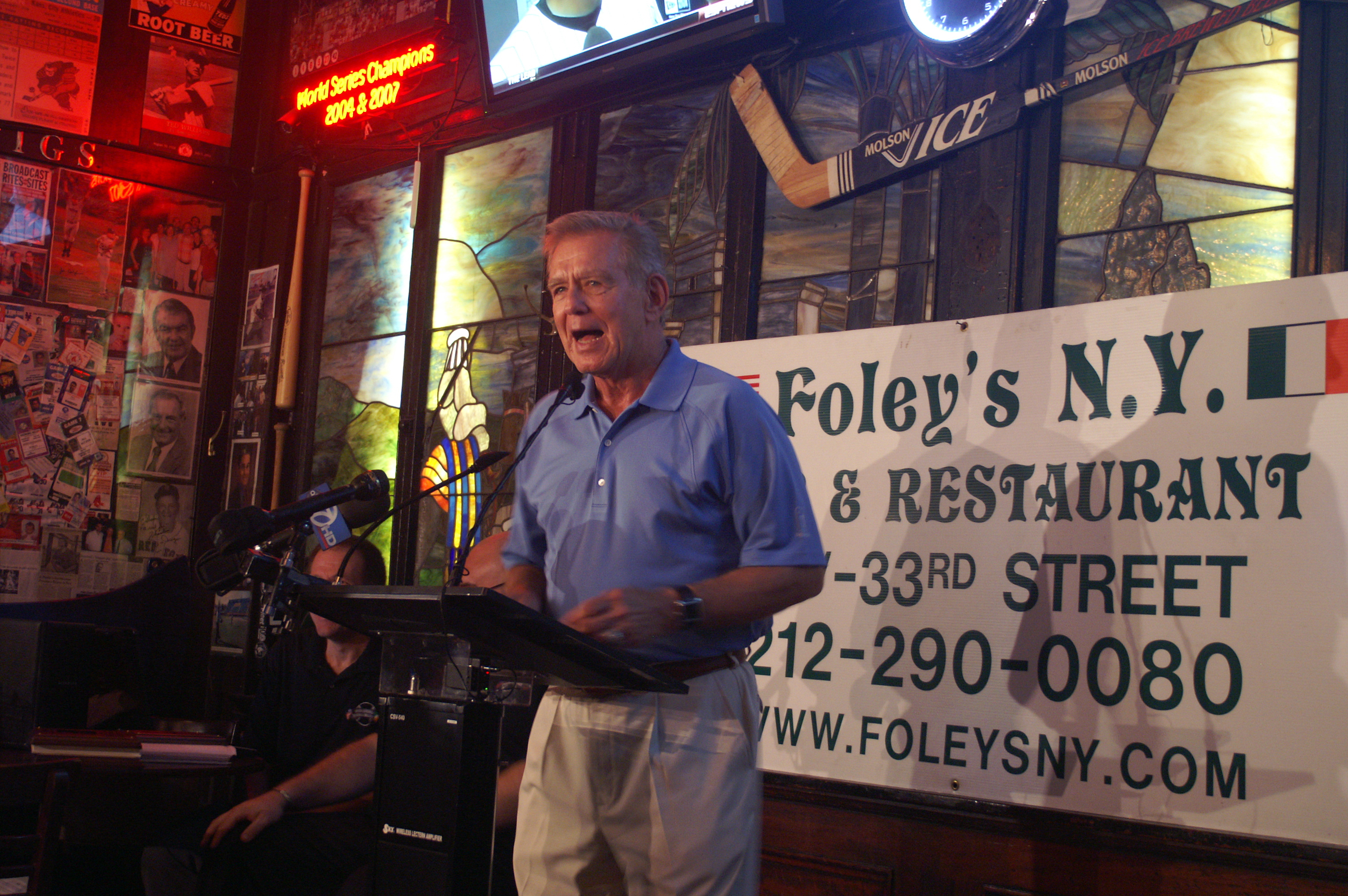
McCarver speaking upon being inducted into the Irish American Baseball Hall of Fame, August 2010

Baseball

- Two-time World Series champion
- Two-time National League All-Star
- 2010 Irish American Baseball Hall of Fame inductee.

Broadcasting

- Three-time Sports Emmy Award winner (Outstanding Sports Event Analyst)
- 2012 Ford C. Frick Award – National Baseball Hall of Fame
- 2024 NSMA Hall of Fame

The minor league baseball stadium in Memphis was christened Tim McCarver Stadium in 1978 before being replaced by a new downtown stadium (named AutoZone Park in a naming rights arrangement) in 2000.

== Works ==
- McCarver, Tim; Levenson, Bob (1987). Oh Baby, I Love It!: Baseball Summers, Hot Pennant Races, Grand Salamis, Jellylegs, El Swervos, Dingers and Dunkers. Random House. ISBN 978-0394556918.
- McCarver, Tim; Peary, Danny (1999). Tim McCarver's Baseball for Brain Surgeons and Other Fans: Understanding and Interpreting the Game So You Can Watch It Like a Pro. Villard. ISBN 978-0375753404.
- McCarver, Tim; Peary, Danny (2008). Tim McCarver's Diamond Gems. McGraw-Hill Professional. ISBN 978-0071545945.

== See also ==
- List of St. Louis Cardinals team records
- List of Major League Baseball annual triples leaders
- List of Major League Baseball players who played in four decades

Media offices
Preceded by Jim McKay	American television prime time anchor, Winter Olympic Games (with Paula Zahn); 1992	Succeeded by Greg Gumbel
Preceded by First	Lead color commentator, Major League Baseball on Fox (with Bob Brenley from 1996 to 1999); 1996 to 2013	Succeeded by Harold Reynolds and Tom Verducci
Preceded by Howard Cosell	Lead color commentator, Major League Baseball on ABC (with Jim Palmer); 1985–1989; 1994–1995	Succeeded by Last
Preceded by Tom Seaver	Lead color commentator, Major League Baseball Game of the Week; 1990–2013	Succeeded by Harold Reynolds and Tom Verducci
