= Carlton Fisk =

American baseball player (born 1947)

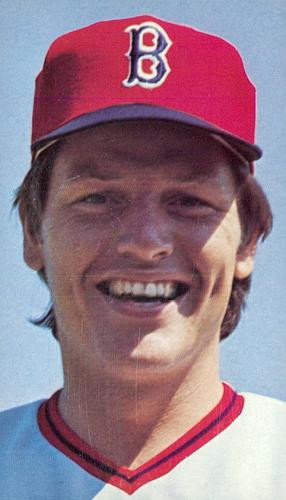
- Fisk with the Boston Red Sox in 1976
- Catcher
- Born: December 26, 1947 (age 78); Bellows Falls, Vermont, U.S.
- Batted: Right Threw: Right

MLB debut
- September 18, 1969, for the Boston Red Sox

Last MLB appearance
- June 22, 1993, for the Chicago White Sox

MLB statistics
- Batting average: .269
- Hits: 2,356
- Home runs: 376
- Runs batted in: 1,330
- Stats at Baseball Reference

Teams
- Boston Red Sox (1969, 1971–1980); Chicago White Sox (1981–1993)

Career highlights and awards
- 11× All-Star (1972–1974, 1976–1978, 1980–1982, 1985, 1991); AL Rookie of the Year (1972); Gold Glove Award (1972); 3× Silver Slugger Award (1981, 1985, 1988); Boston Red Sox No. 27 retired; Chicago White Sox No. 72 retired; Boston Red Sox Hall of Fame

Member of the National

Baseball Hall of Fame
- Induction: 2000
- Vote: 79.6% (second ballot)

Carlton Ernest Fisk (born December 26, 1947), nicknamed "Pudge" and "the Commander", is an American former professional baseball catcher who played 24 seasons in Major League Baseball (MLB) for the Boston Red Sox and the Chicago White Sox. In 1972, he was the first player to be unanimously voted American League (AL) Rookie of the Year. Fisk is best known for his game-winning home run in the 12th inning of Game 6 of the 1975 World Series, during which he memorably waved his arms hoping for the batted ball to remain fair.

At the time of his retirement, Fisk held the record for most home runs all-time by a catcher with 376 (since surpassed by Mike Piazza). He has held several age- or longevity-related records, including the record for most games played at the position of catcher with 2,226 (later surpassed by Iván Rodríguez, who also shared Fisk's nickname "Pudge"). Fisk still holds the AL record for most years served at the position (24). Fisk was voted to the All-Star team 11 times and won three Silver Slugger Awards which is awarded annually to the best offensive player at each position. In 2000, Fisk was elected to the Baseball Hall of Fame.

== Early life ==
Fisk was born in Bellows Falls, Vermont, but according to Fisk, that was only because Bellows Falls had the nearest hospital to his hometown, Charlestown, New Hampshire. He was raised by his parents, Leona and Cecil, along with older brother Calvin, younger brothers Conrad and Cedric and younger sisters Janet and June. He grew up in Charlestown, across the Connecticut River from Bellows Falls. Fisk attended Charlestown High School, where he played baseball (under Coach Ralph Silva), soccer, and basketball. Because his family is from New Hampshire, he insisted that the organization remove from his plaque in the Red Sox Hall of Fame its characterization of him as a Vermont native. Fisk earned his longtime nickname, "Pudge", because he was a chubby youngster.

He played on the Charlestown High baseball team, appearing at third base, catcher and pitcher for Coach Silva. Two of his teammates were his brothers Calvin and Conrad, who were drafted by the Baltimore Orioles and Montreal Expos, respectively, but never made it to the minors due to Calvin's being drafted and inducted into military service during the Vietnam War and Conrad hurting his arm. Since the high school baseball season was limited to 17 games annually due to the inclement New England weather, he also played in the American Legion baseball league in 1964, appearing with the team from Claremont, New Hampshire. In 1965, he played for the Legion Post 37 team in Bellows Falls that had won the 1964 Vermont State Championship.

Fisk excelled at basketball. When he was a sophomore, he was a starter and helped Charlestown to an undefeated season and the 1963 New Hampshire Class M championship. His play in a 1964 high school basketball tournament in the Boston Garden drew the attention of Boston Celtics owner Walter Brown, who told a local reporter, "You have got to tell me—who is that kid?" Fisk had 42 points and 38 rebounds in the 1965 state tournament semifinal loss to Hopkinton High School. He was awarded a basketball scholarship by the University of New Hampshire, where he started for the UNH Wildcats while also playing baseball. He met his wife Linda Foust while at UNH. The freshman team that Fisk played for was undefeated for the 1965–66 season. In 1966, he played collegiate summer baseball in the Cape Cod Baseball League for the Orleans Cardinals. In his sophomore year, the Red Sox drafted him in the first round of the January 1967 amateur draft, and his athletic future was set. Fisk gave up his dreams of basketball glory. "I could never be a six-foot-two power forward and play for the Celtics," he said.

== Professional career ==
=== Minor leagues ===
In 1967, Fisk played briefly for the Red Sox team in the Florida Instructional League, hitting .195 with 0 HR and 0 RBI in 47 at bats.

In 1968, Fisk played for the Waterloo Hawks, the Red Sox' Class A affiliate in the Midwest League. In 62 games, Fisk hit .338 with 12 HR and 34 RBI.

Fisk played 28 games for the Red Sox in the Florida Instructional League in 1969, hitting .245 with 4 HR and 19 RBI. He then played for the Class AA Pittsfield Red Sox of the Eastern League, where he hit .243 with 10 HR and 41 RBI in 97 games and 309 at-bats. Finally, he made his major league debut, appearing in 2 games for the Boston Red Sox in 1969.

In 1970, Fisk played for the Class AA Pawtucket Red Sox, where he batted .229 with 12 HR and 44 RBI in 93 games.

Fisk played for the Class AAA Louisville Colonels of the International League in 1971, hitting .263 with 10 HR and 43 RBI in 93 games, before being called up to the Boston Red Sox.

=== Boston Red Sox (1969, 1971–1980) ===
Carlton Fisk's number 27 was retired by the Boston Red Sox in 2000.

Fisk joined the Army Reserve in 1967. After a short stint of active duty at Fort Dix, New Jersey, where Fisk finished his initial training, he served as a member of the 393rd Service and Supply Battalion in Chester, Vermont, completing monthly weekend drills and two-week annual training periods until 1971.

Fisk was once again called up from the minors at the end of 1971 and earned himself a place on Boston's 1972 spring training roster. As history would have it, Fisk broke into the major leagues (to stay) early in the 1972 season. Boston manager Darrell Johnson, whom Fisk credited for making him a major leaguer, taught Fisk how to be a leader and a field general for the team. Playing with abandon and all-out aggressiveness was one thing, channeling energy intelligently was another. "Johnson taught me to think about all the important facets of the catcher's role, the things that help pitchers in various ways and those that let your teammates know you want to win," he told an interviewer in 1973.

On September 12, 1971, Fisk hit his first career home run off of Detroit's Les Cain at Tiger Stadium. In 1972, Fisk batted .293 with 22 home runs, and a .909 OPS. In addition, he led the American League with nine triples (tied with Oakland's Joe Rudi), and was the last catcher to lead the AL in this statistical category. His play earned him both the AL Gold Glove and AL Rookie of the Year awards. He was selected unanimously for the latter award, becoming the first unanimous AL Rookie of the Year. He also finished fourth in American League MVP voting.

In June 1974, Fisk suffered a devastating knee injury when Leron Lee of the Cleveland Indians collided with him at home plate, tearing several knee ligaments. After undergoing reconstructive knee surgery, Fisk was told he would never play again, yet the backstop returned just twelve months later.

In 1975, Fisk re-injured himself in spring training and did not play until June. In only 79 game appearances, Fisk hit .331 along with 52 RBI. Boston won the AL East Division with a record of 95–65.

==== 1975 ALCS and World Series ====
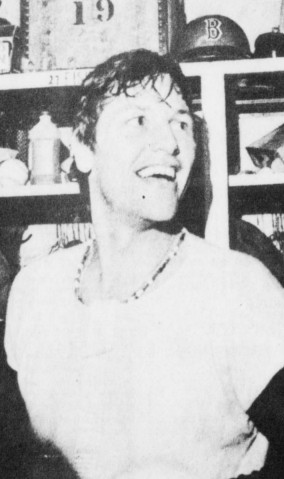
Carlton Fisk following his walk-off home run in Game 6 of the 1975 World Series

Fisk batted .417 in the 1975 ALCS, as Boston swept the three-time defending champion Oakland Athletics.

In Game 3 of the World Series at Riverfront Stadium, Fisk led off the second inning with a solo home run off Cincinnati starter Gary Nolan. In the bottom of the 10th inning, Reds pinch-hitter Ed Armbrister collided with Fisk at home plate while starting to run out a sacrifice bunt, leading to a wild throw by Fisk to second base that allowed Cesar Geronimo to reach third base and eventually score the winning run. Fisk and Boston manager Darrell Johnson argued the controversial call, claiming that Armbrister should have been ruled out for interference, but home plate umpire Larry Barnett ruled otherwise. "To this day, I still think it was interference," said Fisk in an interview after his retirement.

Leading off the bottom of the 12th inning of Game 6 at Fenway Park, Fisk hit a pitch off of Cincinnati relief pitcher Pat Darcy that went down the left-field line and appeared to be heading into foul territory. The image of Fisk jumping and waving the ball fair as he made his way to first base is considered by many to be one of baseball's greatest moments. The ball struck the foul pole for a home run, giving the Red Sox a 7–6 win and forcing a seventh and deciding game of the Fall Classic. "The celebration of that moment has made me realize how popular baseball is and how it affects people's lives," Fisk told The Boston Globe. "It's still the greatest moment in my career."

The image of him waving the ball fair changed the way baseball was televised. During this time, cameramen covering baseball were instructed to follow the flight of the ball. In a 1999 interview, NBC cameraman Lou Gerard said that he had been distracted by a nearby rat. Unable to follow the ball, he kept the camera on Fisk instead. This play was perhaps the most important catalyst in getting camera operators to focus most of their attention on the players themselves.

==== Last years in Boston ====
Fisk was among the top offensive catchers in the American League in his eight full seasons with the Boston Red Sox. His best year in Boston was in 1977, when he hit .315 with 26 home runs and 102 runs batted in.

Facing the rival New York Yankees in the 1978 AL East Playoff, Fisk went 1-for-3 with a single in Boston's 5–4 loss to the Yankees. Some fans attributed Boston's 1978 loss to a rib injury sustained by Fisk. The same injury left Fisk on the sidelines for several games during the 1979 season, a year in which his primary position was designated hitter.

Fisk was reportedly among a group of several Red Sox players who lobbied Boston management for players to be paid what they deserved, which made him none too popular with Haywood Sullivan, the Boston general manager. When Fisk's contract expired at the end of the 1980 season, Sullivan in fact mailed him a new contract, but put it in the mail one day after the contractual deadline. As a result, Fisk became a free agent. In 11 years with the Boston Red Sox, Fisk was selected to seven All-Star games, and batted .284 with 161 home runs and 568 RBI. He nearly had more RBIs than strikeouts, striking out only 588 times in 4353 plate appearances with the Red Sox, with an OBP of .356.

=== Chicago White Sox (1981–1993) ===
Carlton Fisk's number 72 was retired by the Chicago White Sox in 1997.

Fisk signed a five-year contract for $3.5 million with the White Sox on March 18, 1981. Fisk had worn number 27 with the Red Sox but it was worn by White Sox pitcher Ken Kravec. Fisk chose to wear 72 with the White Sox explaining that he had won American League Rookie of the Year in 1972; his son Casey had been born in 1972; and 72 was the reverse of 27. Although Kravec was traded just ten days later, Fisk retained the number 72 throughout his career with the White Sox. As the season got underway, Fisk was interviewed by the media concerning his switching teams, and joked that "after a decade with the Red Sox, it was time to change my sox!" On opening day 1981, Fisk started the season with the White Sox against his former team in Fenway Park. In the eighth inning, Fisk knocked a three-run homer to put his new team on top, 5–3.

After joining the White Sox, he helped the team win its first American League Western Division title in 1983. His .289 batting average, 26 home runs, and 86 RBI, as well as his leadership on the young team, helped him to finish third in the MVP voting (behind Baltimore teammates Cal Ripken Jr. and Eddie Murray). Fisk also caught LaMarr Hoyt that season, the 1983 Cy Young Award winner. Fisk played poorly in Chicago's loss to the Baltimore Orioles in the 1983 ALCS, hitting .176 with zero runs batted in.

On May 16, 1984, Fisk accomplished the rare feat of hitting for the cycle in Comiskey Park against the Kansas City Royals. Fisk's triple in the bottom of the seventh inning off Dan Quisenberry was the only triple he hit in the season. Injuries once again befell Fisk in the 1984 season, limiting him to just 102 games and a .231 average. The experience led him to begin a new training regimen which he used for the rest of his career. In his Hall of Fame induction speech, Fisk credited White Sox strength and conditioning coach Phil Claussen for his turnaround. Claussen introduced Fisk to a more scientific approach to physical conditioning which included long sessions of weight training. Fisk often credited the training program with extending his career.

In 1985, following the advent of his new training program, Fisk had the most productive offensive year of his career. He hit 37 home runs and drove in 107 runs, both career-high numbers; the home run numbers tied Dick Allen's 13-year White Sox single-season record and was the AL single-season record for home runs hit by a primary catcher until it was broken by Salvador Perez in 2021. At the age of 37, Fisk tied his career high for stolen bases (17). He was voted to the All-Star team, won the Silver Slugger award and finished 13th in the A.L. MVP voting.

On August 4, 1985, Fisk caught all nine innings of Tom Seaver's complete game 300th career victory, which was played in Yankee Stadium. Fisk caught Bobby Thigpen as he set the then-record for most saves in a season (57) in 1990. In 2005, Jack McDowell credited Fisk as being instrumental in his development into a pitcher who won the Cy Young Award in 1993.

After the 1985 season, the White Sox came close to trading Fisk to the New York Yankees for designated hitter Don Baylor. Baylor was unhappy with the Yankees since he did not play every day as he wanted (despite being the team's regular DH) and asked to be traded. The potential deal was complicated in that the White Sox would have to re-sign Fisk, a free agent, and that both players would have to agree to the trade. Negotiations between the two teams ended when they were unable to reach an agreement. The White Sox re-signed Fisk, who remained with the club until the end of his career. During spring training in 1986, the Yankees traded Baylor to the Boston Red Sox for designated hitter Mike Easler.

On August 17, 1990, in the second game of a two-night doubleheader in Arlington, Texas Fisk broke Johnny Bench's career home run record for catchers by hitting his 328th longball as a catcher off Charlie Hough in the top of the second inning. He went on to end his career as the all-time leader in home runs by a catcher with 351. On May 5, 2004 Mike Piazza surpassed Fisk's record by belting his 352nd as a backstop. Fisk still holds the American League record for homers by a catcher.

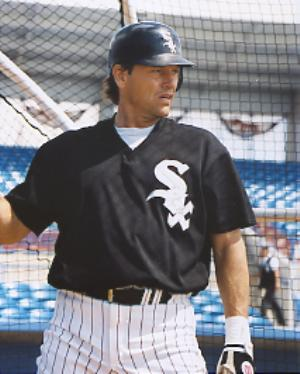
Fisk with the White Sox c. 1992

A single in the 1991 All-Star Game made him the oldest player in MLB history to collect a hit in an All-Star game.

The 1993 season was Fisk's last. In February, Fisk and the Sox had a dispute over signing a one-year deal, where the former alleged it was only a minor league deal and the latter asserting it as a technicality to protect the 40-man roster. Owner Jerry Reinsdorf called him a "prima donna", but the two sides eventually reached a deal.

On June 22, 1993, Fisk broke Bob Boone's record for career games caught with his 2,226th game behind the plate. Fisk was passed on this list by Iván Rodríguez on June 17, 2009.

Six days after breaking Bob Boone's all-time games caught record, Fisk was abruptly released by the Chicago White Sox at age 45. Fisk was notified of his dismissal in his hotel room in Cleveland while on a road trip with the team. It is reported that he was ordered to turn in his equipment and immediately fly back to Chicago, alone. To add insult to injury, Fisk was thrown out of the White Sox clubhouse later that season when he stopped by to wish his teammates good luck in the playoffs. Fisk was one of two final active players in the 1990s who had played in the 1960s. The other was Nolan Ryan. He is one of only 29 players in baseball history to date to have appeared in MLB games in four decades.

In thirteen seasons with the White Sox, Fisk was selected to four All-Star games and batted .257 with 214 home runs and 762 RBI. Fisk had nearly as many RBIs as strikeouts with the White Sox, striking out 798 times in 5,500 plate appearances.

For his career, Fisk caught a then-record 2,226 games over 24 seasons. Playing in 2,499 total games, Fisk also played 41 games in left field, 27 games at 1B and four games at 3B and was a DH for 166 games in his career. Overall he hit .269 with 376 home runs and 1,330 RBI in his career.

Fisk made mention of the fireworks between himself and Reinsdorf in his Hall of Fame induction speech, and Fisk was inducted with a Red Sox cap, although both teams retired his number, with the White Sox doing it first with his number 72 on September 14, 1997, and the Red Sox with his number 27 in 2000. In 2005, he had a statue dedicated at U.S. Cellular Field in 2005. In 2008, Fisk officially rejoined the White Sox organization by becoming a team ambassador and part of the White Sox speaker's bureau.

=== Notable feuds ===
Fisk was known for his longstanding feud with New York Yankees catcher Thurman Munson. One particular incident that typified their feud, and the Yankees – Red Sox rivalry in general, occurred on August 1, 1973, at Fenway Park. With the score 2–2 in the top of the ninth inning, Munson, attempting to score on Gene Michael's missed bunt attempt, barreled into Fisk, triggering a 10-minute bench-clearing brawl in which both catchers were ejected. As John Curtis let his first pitch go, Munson broke for the plate. Michael tried to bunt, and missed. With Munson coming, the scrawny Yankees shortstop tried to step in Fisk's way, but Fisk elbowed him out of the way and braced for Munson, who crashed into him as hard as he could. Fisk held onto the ball, but Munson tried to lie on top of him to allow Felipe Alou to keep rounding the bases. Fisk kicked Munson off him and into the air, and swiped at him with his fist. Michael grabbed Fisk, and as Curtis grabbed Munson—his former Cape Cod League roommate—Fisk threw Michael down with his left arm and fell to the ground. "Fisk had his left arm right across Stick's throat and wouldn't let up", said Ralph Houk, the Yankees' manager at the time. "Michael couldn't breathe. I had to crawl underneath the pile to try to pry Fisk's arm off his throat to keep him from killing Stick. All the while he had Michael pinned down, he was punching Munson underneath the pile. I had no idea Fisk was that strong, but he was scary."

In another incident typifying the Yankees-Red Sox rivalry, Fisk was involved in an altercation with Lou Piniella during a May 20, 1976, game at Yankee Stadium. In the sixth inning of this game, Piniella barreled into Fisk trying to score on an Otto Vélez single. Fisk and Piniella shoved each other at home plate, triggering another bench-clearing brawl. After order appeared to be restored, Red Sox pitcher Bill Lee and Yankees third baseman Graig Nettles began exchanging words and punches, igniting the brawl anew. Lee suffered a separated left shoulder in the altercation and missed much of the season and was never quite the same again.

In an incident on May 22, 1990, Deion Sanders approached the plate with one out and a runner on third base, drew a dollar sign in the dirt before the pitch, and didn't run to first base since the popup he hit looked like it would be easily caught. Fisk yelled at Sanders "run the fucking ball out" and called Sanders a "piece of shit." Later in the game, Sanders told Fisk "the days of slavery are over." Fisk was furious. "He comes up and wants to make it a racial issue — there's no racial issue involved." He told Sanders during Sanders' next at-bat, "There is a right way and a wrong way to play this game. You're playing it the wrong way. And the rest of us don't like it. Someday, you're going to get this game shoved right down your throat."

== Legacy ==
Pudge works harder than anyone I know, because he sets goals for himself and then follows through. I think he's the ultimate professional.

— Former White Sox manager Jim Fregosi

=== Notable statistics ===
- Oldest catcher in MLB history to hit 20 home runs in a season.
- Holds the record for most home runs hit after the age of 40 (72).
- Holds the record for most years played as a catcher with 24 (1969, 1971–1993).
- At the time of his retirement in 1993, he held the records for most home runs all-time by a catcher with 351 (since passed by Mike Piazza) and most games played at the position of catcher with 2,226 (surpassed by Iván Rodríguez on June 17, 2009).
- Fisk caught 149 shutouts during his career, ranking him second all-time behind Yogi Berra among major league catchers.
- Fisk is one of only seven players in history who have caught more than 150 games in a season multiple times (Jim Sundberg, Randy Hundley, Ted Simmons, Frankie Hayes and Gary Carter).
- Fisk is one of only nineteen catchers elected to the National Baseball Hall of Fame. Among those, Fisk has the most hits (2,356) and runs scored (1,276).
- Fisk holds the record for the longest game by a catcher. On May 9, 1984, he caught all 25 innings of the White Sox's 7–6 win over the Milwaukee Brewers. Fisk threw out four runners attempting to steal during the game. The former record of 24 innings was shared by 5 players: Mike Powers (September 1, 1906), Buddy Rosar and Bob Swift (both on July 21, 1945), Hal King and Jerry Grote (both on April 15, 1968).
- Fisk finished in the top ten in American League Most Valuable Player voting four times (1972, 1977–78, and 1983).
- Fisk's .481 slugging percentage while with the Red Sox is the tenth best in that club's long history.

Fisk was inducted into the Baseball Hall of Fame in 2000, choosing the Boston Red Sox cap for his plaque, although he played for more seasons with the Chicago White Sox.

The Chicago White Sox retired his uniform number 72 on September 14, 1997. The Boston Red Sox retired his uniform number 27 on September 4, 2000. He is one of ten people to have their uniform number retired by at least two teams.

In 1999, he was selected as a finalist for the Major League Baseball All-Century Team, and finished third in the balloting. In 2000, Fisk was elected to the Chicago White Sox All-Century Team. In 2004, he was named the greatest New Hampshire athlete of all time.

In May 2008, Fisk returned to the White Sox as a team ambassador, and a member of the team's speakers bureau.

The 2004 baseball-themed film Mickey features a character who, like Fisk, is a catcher, is known as Pudge, and hits a home run similar to Fisk's 1975 World Series home run. Footage of Fisk's home run appears in the 1997 film Good Will Hunting, during a scene in which the character Sean Maguire (Robin Williams) tells the story of how he met his wife on the same day the game occurred.

=== The Fisk Foul Pole ===
On June 13, 2005, the Red Sox honored Carlton Fisk and the 12th-inning home run that won Game 6 of the 1975 World Series by naming the left field foul pole, which the famous home run contacted, the Fisk Foul Pole. In a pregame ceremony from the Monster Seats, Fisk was cheered by the Fenway Park crowd while the shot was replayed to the strains of Handel's Hallelujah Chorus, the song longtime Fenway Park organist John Kiley originally played following the home run. The Red Sox scheduled the ceremony to coincide with an interleague series against the Cincinnati Reds, who were making their first trip back to Fenway Park since the '75 Series.

Thirty years later, the video of Fisk trying to wave the ball fair remains one of the game's enduring images. Game 6 is often considered one of the best games played in Major League history. The crowd remembered that magical moment at precisely 12:34 a.m. ET early on the morning of October 22, 1975, when Fisk drove a 1–0 fastball from Cincinnati right-hander Pat Darcy high into the air, heading down the left-field line. "The ball only took about two and half seconds", recalled Fisk. "It seemed like I was jumping and waving for more than two and a half seconds." Two and a half seconds later, the ball caromed off the bright yellow pole, ending one of the most dramatic World Series games ever played and giving the Red Sox a 7–6 win over the Reds in 12 hard-fought innings.

On the field, Fisk threw out the ceremonial first pitch to his former batterymate Luis Tiant. From now on, like the Pesky Pole down the right-field line, the left-field pole will officially be called the Fisk Foul Pole. The idea was the inspiration of the countless fans who contacted the Red Sox about recognizing the historic moment. Fenway's right field foul pole, which is just 302 feet (92 m) from the plate, is named Pesky's Pole for former Red Sox shortstop Johnny Pesky. Mel Parnell named the pole after Pesky in 1948 when he won a game with a home run just inside the right-field pole.

=== Rings ===
After the June 13 ceremony in Boston, Fisk received an honorary World Series ring from the Red Sox commemorating their 2004 World Series victory. On Saturday, August 12, 2006, the Chicago White Sox presented Fisk with another ring, this one in honor of the White Sox' 2005 championship.

=== Statue ===
The Chicago White Sox unveiled a life-sized bronze statue of Carlton Fisk on August 7, 2005. The statue is located inside Rate Field on the main concourse in center field. It joined similar statues depicting Charles Comiskey, Frank Thomas and Minnie Miñoso and eventually Luis Aparicio, Nellie Fox, Billy Pierce and Harold Baines.

== Honors ==
- In 1997, the Chicago White Sox retired Fisk's number 72.
- Fisk was inducted into the Boston Red Sox Hall of Fame in 1997.
- Fisk was inducted into the Baseball Hall of Fame in 2000.
- Fisk's number 27 was retired by the Boston Red Sox in 2000.
- Fisk was inducted into the University of New Hampshire Athletics Hall of Fame in 2000.
- in 2004, Fisk was named the greatest athlete of all time from New Hampshire.
- In 2005, Fisk was honored with a statue inside the White Sox's stadium.
- In 2005, the left-field foul pole at Fenway Park was named the Fisk Pole in honor of Fisk.

== Personal life ==
Fisk appears briefly in the 1989 film Field of Dreams, playing for the White Sox on a television screen. Fisk is a supporter of the Cancer Support Center. He and his wife Linda serve on the Honorary Board. Fisk grows and collects orchids.

Fisk and his wife Linda (née Foust) have three children, Carlyn, Courtney and Casey, and ten grandchildren. Fisk is the brother in law of former major league and minor league teammate Rick Miller, who married Fisk's sister Janet in 1973. Fisk's daughter Carlyn, a volleyball player, was inducted into the University of Illinois-Chicago Athletics Hall of Fame in 1997. Fisk's daughter, Courtney, helped lead Lockport Township High School to the Illinois State Volleyball Championship. Fisk's son Casey played college baseball at Illinois State University and is currently a college baseball coach and owns a sports performance training business.

On October 22, 2012, Fisk was charged with a DUI in New Lenox, Illinois, after he was found beside a corn field, unconscious behind the wheel of his vehicle. He pleaded guilty to the charge on December 27, 2012. In 2012, Fisk's Florida home was burglarized, with thieves taking valuable coins.

== Career statistics ==
Carlton Fisk's career statistics.

G	AB	H	2B	3B	HR	R	RBI	SB	BB	IBB	SO	SH	SF	HBP	AVG	OBP	SLG	FLD%
2,499	8,756	2,356	421	47	376	1,276	1,330	128	849	105	1,386	26	79	143	.269	.341	.457	.987

== See also ==
- Boston Red Sox Hall of Fame
- List of Major League Baseball annual triples leaders
- List of Major League Baseball career doubles leaders
- List of Major League Baseball career hits leaders
- List of Major League Baseball career home run leaders
- List of Major League Baseball career putouts as a catcher leaders
- List of Major League Baseball career runs batted in leaders
- List of Major League Baseball career runs scored leaders
- List of Major League Baseball career total bases leaders
- List of Major League Baseball players to hit for the cycle
- List of Major League Baseball players who played in four decades

Preceded by Cal Ripken Jr.	Hitting for the cycle May 16, 1984	Succeeded by Willie McGee
