= List of Major League Baseball players who played in four decades =

Playing Major League Baseball in four decades has been attained by only 31 players in the league's history, dating from the 1870s to the present day.

== Introduction ==
Since 1900 (the first year that a player could play in a "fourth decade"), every completed decade except the 1920s has added at least one player to the list.

Outside of skill and durability, a player must usually have some "generational luck" to have started his career in the later years of a decade, so that if he is still playing 21–24 years later, he is playing in the early years of a fourth decade. For example, Albert Pujols started his career in 2001, so he would have had to play 30 seasons to make the list. Whereas Bill Buckner, whose career started in the last year of the 1960s, finished his career in the first year of the 1990s, requiring only 22 seasons to make the list. Most of the players on the list started their careers in the final or second-to-last year of their first decade and finished their careers in the first or second year of their fourth decade (a notable exception is Nolan Ryan, whose 27 seasons played is a major league record).

Although it has always been possible for a retired three-decade player to make a cameo appearance in a fourth decade for the purpose of joining the list, the only player to have actually done this was Minnie Miñoso, who took the field twice for his former team, the White Sox, at the ages of 50 and 54 as part of a publicity stunt organized by owners Bill and Mike Veeck. Such a stunt has become less likely in the modern era after the introduction of the 40 man roster and league minimum salaries.

=== Five-decade players ===
Minnie Miñoso, Nick Altrock and Satchel Paige are the only three players to have appeared in major league baseball games in five different decades. None were continuously active at the MLB level; Altrock was a coach on the Washington Senators and appeared sparingly over just seventeen games in a twenty-two season span from 1912 to 1933, while Satchel Paige spent significant time in the minors during his 40 years in professional baseball.

Paige was added to the list post mortem, due to Major League Baseball incorporating Negro league records (and thus his career in the 1920s and 1930s) into its own history in 2021. Paige was just one of at least a dozen Negro League players whose careers spanned four decades, or more. Candy Jim Taylor's career as a full-time player began in 1904 and ended in the mid-1930s, but he made a handful of appearances while managing in the Negro American League in the 1940s. Hence, like Paige, Taylor qualifies as a five-decade player.

=== Pre-National League four-decade players ===
Major League Baseball recognizes the first major league season as 1876, the inaugural season of the National League. The following three players played parts of their careers in the 1850s and 1860s, and do not qualify as four-decade players, although they played four decades at the highest level of play available to them at the time: Joe Start (1859–1886), Candy Nelson (1867–1890), and Deacon White (1868–1890).

The National Association is widely recognized as a precursor to modern major league baseball. It existed from 1871 to 1875, before giving way to the National League in 1876. One four-decade player, Jim O'Rourke began his career in 1872 with the National Association's Middletown Mansfields.

=== Negro Leagues four-decade players ===
African Americans have played professionally since 1878 when Bud Fowler first played professionally, although he had been playing since at least 1877 and possibly as early as 1872. Major League Baseball does not consider any players or leagues prior to 1920 to be Major league players. The following players played four decades at the highest level of play possible to them at the time: Bud Fowler (1878–1904), Clarence Williams (1886–1913), Candy Jim Taylor (1904–1942) (as noted above), Smokey Joe Williams (1905–1932), John Henry Lloyd (1906–1932), Pelayo Chacón (1908–1931), Oscar Charleston (1915–1941), José Fernández (1915–1947), George Britt (1917–1942), and Bill Holland (1919–1941). Taylor also played at the highest level possible to him for five decades.

=== Future candidates ===
It is unlikely that the 2020s will add any players to the list as none who debuted in the 1990s has played past 2019. Near misses include Rick Ankiel (debuted 1999), who ended his attempt at a comeback in 2019, Adrian Beltre (born 1979), who made his debut in 1998, but retired after the 2018 season, and Bartolo Colón (debuted 1997) whose reported interest in pitching for the New York Mets in 2022 came to nothing. Colón did play national championship baseball in four different decades, however, with 11 games for the Mexican League's Acereros de Monclova in 2021.

The next opportunity to make the list will come in 2030 for a player who debuted in 2009 or earlier. Justin Verlander's retirement announcement prior to the 2026 All-Star game leaves Max Scherzer as the only candidate currently on an MLB roster, although Andrew McCutchen is under contract to the Braves organisation and Carlos Carrasco appeared in MLB games in 2026 before moving to the Korean leagues.

== List of players ==
The players are listed by primary position played and years spanning their careers. Fifteen players from the group have been inducted into the National Baseball Hall of Fame. Of the 31 players, 12 were primarily pitchers, six were primarily catchers, seven were primarily outfielders, and six were primarily infielders; the group covers virtually the complete range of baseball positions, missing only a third baseman.

Key
†	Member of the National Baseball Hall of Fame

List
Player	Position	First season	Last season
Dan Brouthers^{†}	First baseman	1879	1904
Jim O'Rourke^{†}	Outfielder	1872	1904
Kid Gleason	Pitcher / Second baseman	1888	1912
Deacon McGuire	Catcher	1884	1912
Jack O'Connor	Catcher	1887	1912
Jack Ryan	Catcher	1889	1913
Nick Altrock	Pitcher	1898	1933
Eddie Collins^{†}	Second baseman	1906	1930
Jack Quinn	Pitcher	1909	1933
Satchel Paige^{†}	Pitcher	1927	1965
Bobo Newsom	Pitcher	1929	1953
Mickey Vernon	First baseman	1939	1960
Ted Williams^{†}	Outfielder	1939	1960
Early Wynn^{†}	Pitcher	1939	1963
Minnie Miñoso^{†}	Outfielder	1947	1980
Willie Mays^{†}	Outfielder	1948	1973
Jim Kaat^{†}	Pitcher	1959	1983
Tim McCarver	Catcher	1959	1980
Willie McCovey^{†}	First baseman	1959	1980
Bill Buckner	First baseman	1969	1990
Rick Dempsey	Catcher	1969	1992
Carlton Fisk^{†}	Catcher	1969	1993
Jerry Reuss	Pitcher	1969	1990
Nolan Ryan^{†}	Pitcher	1966	1993
Rickey Henderson^{†}	Outfielder	1979	2003
Mike Morgan	Pitcher	1978	2002
Jesse Orosco	Pitcher	1979	2003
Tim Raines^{†}	Outfielder	1979	2002
Ken Griffey Jr.^{†}	Outfielder	1989	2010
Jamie Moyer	Pitcher	1986	2012
Omar Vizquel	Shortstop	1989	2012
