= Jesse Orosco =

American baseball player (born 1957)

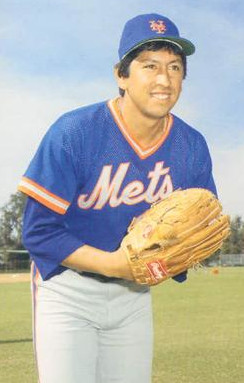
- Orosco with the New York Mets in 1986
- Pitcher
- Born: April 21, 1957 (age 69); Santa Barbara, California, U.S.
- Batted: Right Threw: Left

MLB debut
- April 5, 1979, for the New York Mets

Last MLB appearance
- September 27, 2003, for the Minnesota Twins

MLB statistics
- Games pitched: 1,252
- Win–loss record: 87–80
- Earned run average: 3.16
- Strikeouts: 1,179
- Saves: 144
- Stats at Baseball Reference

Teams
- New York Mets (1979, 1981–1987); Los Angeles Dodgers (1988); Cleveland Indians (1989–1991); Milwaukee Brewers (1992–1994); Baltimore Orioles (1995–1999); St. Louis Cardinals (2000); Los Angeles Dodgers (2001–2002); San Diego Padres (2003); New York Yankees (2003); Minnesota Twins (2003)

Career highlights and awards
- 2× All-Star (1983, 1984); 2× World Series champion (1986, 1988); MLB record 1,252 career games pitched

Jesse Russell Orosco (born April 21, 1957) is an American former professional baseball relief pitcher. He played in Major League Baseball from 1979 to 2003 for the New York Mets, Los Angeles Dodgers, Cleveland Indians, Milwaukee Brewers, Baltimore Orioles, St. Louis Cardinals, San Diego Padres, New York Yankees and Minnesota Twins.

Orosco was named to the MLB All-Star Game in 1983 and 1984. Orosco won a World Series in 1986 with the Mets and in 1988 with the Dodgers. He retired when he was 46 years old, one of the oldest players to still be playing in the modern age. Orosco is one of only 31 players in baseball history to date to have appeared in Major League games in four decades.

Orosco holds the major league record for career pitching appearances, having pitched in 1,252 games. His longevity was aided by the increasing use of left-handed specialist relief pitchers from the 1990s onward; in his last several years, he was used almost exclusively in this role.

== Career ==
Orosco was originally drafted by the St. Louis Cardinals in the 1977 Major League Baseball draft but chose not to sign. He was then drafted out of Santa Barbara City College by the Minnesota Twins in the 1978 Major League Baseball draft. In February 1979, the Twins traded Orosco to the New York Mets to complete a deal that had sent veteran starter Jerry Koosman to Minnesota two months earlier.

Orosco made his debut on April 5, 1979, with the Mets. Orosco had his best seasons in the early and mid-1980s with the Mets. He had a career-best 1.47 earned run average in 1983. That year, he also won 13 games and saved 17, with 110 innings pitched, making his first All-Star Team and finishing third in the National League Cy Young Award voting. He had 31 saves in 1984, which was third in the National League, and went 10–6 in 60 appearances, good enough for his second All-Star selection. In 1985, he began sharing closing duties for the Mets with right-hander Roger McDowell, giving the Mets a vaunted lefty–righty combo coming out of the bullpen to close games.

In 1983, Orosco became just the third and, to date, the last Mets pitcher to record two wins in the same day. This feat had been accomplished by Craig Anderson in 1962 and Willard Hunter in 1964. On July 31, 1983, Banner Day, the Mets won both games of a double-header against the Pirates in extra-inning walk-off wins. Orosco pitched the last four innings of the first game and the final inning of the second game, and both times was the pitcher of record when the Mets rallied to win.

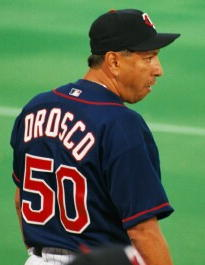
Orosco with the Minnesota Twins during his final season in 2003

Orosco's clutch relief pitching in the 1986 postseason was one of the key reasons the Mets won the World Series. He was on the mound for the final pitch of the final game of both the NLCS against the Houston Astros, and the World Series against the Boston Red Sox, striking out the final batter in both series. He became the first (and only) relief pitcher to get three wins in one playoff series, which he accomplished in the NLCS against the Astros.

At his peak, Orosco was virtually unhittable against left-handed batters. Rob Neyer later wrote that Orosco stayed in the majors for almost a quarter-century because of "his ability to make lefties look foolish."

After the 1987 season, the Mets sent Orosco to the Los Angeles Dodgers in a three-team trade in which the Dodgers sent Bob Welch and Matt Young to the Oakland Athletics and Jack Savage to the Mets, the Athletics sent Alfredo Griffin and Jay Howell to the Dodgers, and the Athletics sent Kevin Tapani and Wally Whitehurst to the Mets. Orosco was a member of the 1988 World Series champions. He then signed with the Cleveland Indians and stayed there for three years.

Orosco played for the Orioles for the latter half of the 1990s. While his best seasons came in New York, he had an excellent 1997 season, finishing with a 2.32 ERA, his best since the 1980s. On June 25, 1999, Orosco set the all-time record for major league relief appearance with 1,051, passing Kent Tekulve.

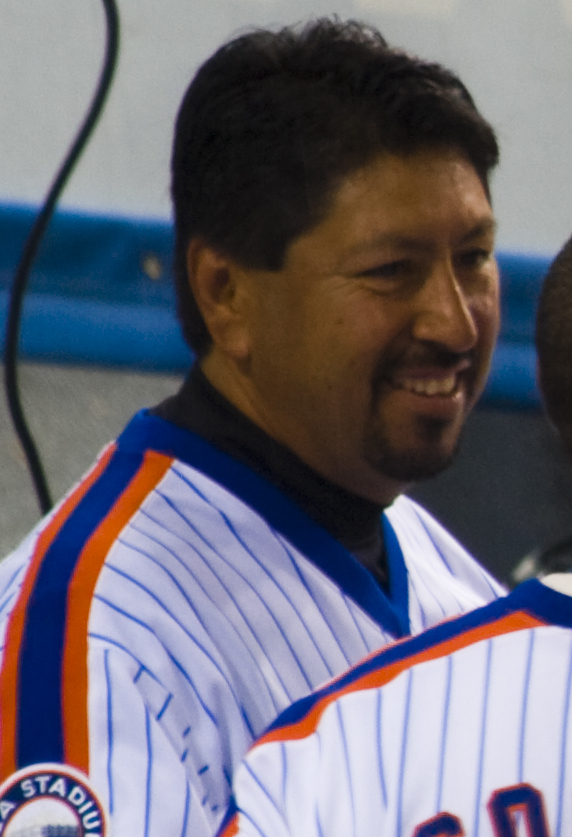
Orosco at the final game at Shea Stadium, 2008

After the 1999 season, the Orioles traded Orosco to the Mets for Chuck McElroy. Before the 2000 season began, the Mets traded him to the St. Louis Cardinals for Joe McEwing. Granted free agency after the 2000 season, Orosco signed with the Dodgers for the 2001 season and again for the 2002 season. He signed with the San Diego Padres for the 2003 season.

In 2003, Orosco was on three different teams and finished with 33 innings pitched. On July 23, the Padres traded Orosco to the New York Yankees for a player to be named later. At the end of August, the Yankees traded him to the Twins for a player to be named later, later identified as Juan Padilla. Orosco played his last game on September 27 with the Twins. He signed with the Arizona Diamondbacks for the 2004 season, but decided to retire before spring training.

Orosco was eligible for the Baseball Hall of Fame in 2009; however, his lifetime stats made him a longshot for the Hall and he dropped off the ballot after receiving one vote. He was the last active MLB player from the 1970s, outlasting Rickey Henderson (the last active position player). As of 2023, Orosco is the only player in Major League history with more than 1,200 games pitched or more than 1,000 inherited runners.

== See also ==
- List of oldest Major League Baseball players
- List of Major League Baseball players who played in four decades
- List of Major League Baseball career saves leaders

Preceded by Gary Gaetti	Oldest Player in the National League; 2000–2003	Succeeded by Julio Franco
