= Bill Buckner =

American baseball player (1949–2019)

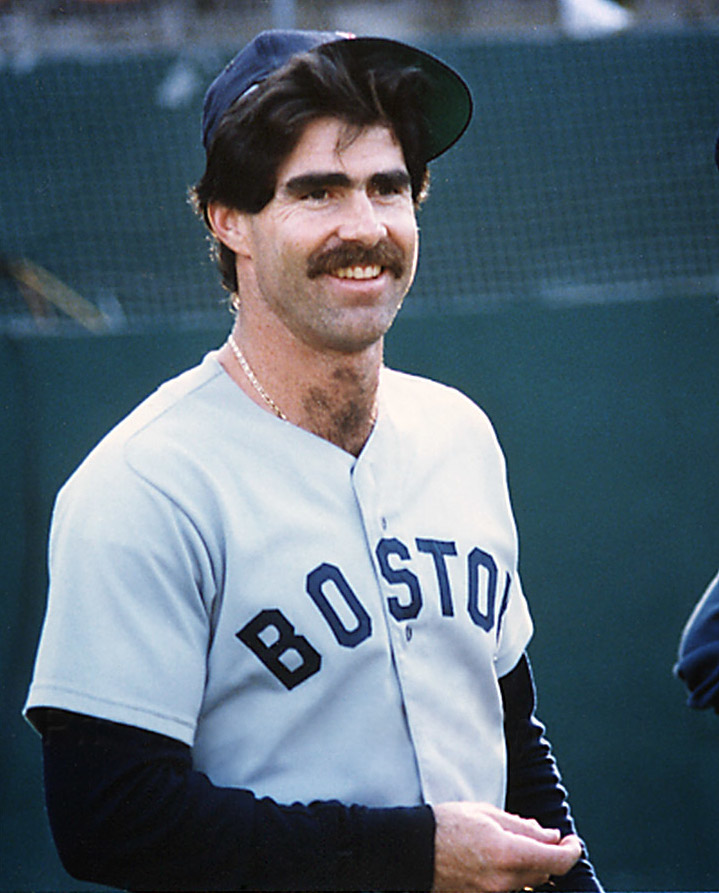
- Buckner with the Boston Red Sox, c. 1986
- First baseman / Outfielder
- Born: December 14, 1949; Vallejo, California, U.S.
- Died: May 27, 2019 (aged 69); Boise, Idaho, U.S.
- Batted: Left Threw: Left

MLB debut
- September 21, 1969, for the Los Angeles Dodgers

Last MLB appearance
- May 30, 1990, for the Boston Red Sox

MLB statistics
- Batting average: .289
- Hits: 2,715
- Home runs: 174
- Runs batted in: 1,208
- Stats at Baseball Reference

Teams
- Los Angeles Dodgers (1969–1976); Chicago Cubs (1977–1984); Boston Red Sox (1984–1987); California Angels (1987–1988); Kansas City Royals (1988–1989); Boston Red Sox (1990)

Career highlights and awards
- All-Star (1981); NL batting champion (1980); Chicago Cubs Hall of Fame

William Joseph Buckner (December 14, 1949 – May 27, 2019) was an American first baseman and left fielder in Major League Baseball (MLB) who played for five teams from 1969 through 1990, most notably the Chicago Cubs, Los Angeles Dodgers, and Boston Red Sox. Beginning his career as an outfielder with the Dodgers, Buckner helped the team to the 1974 pennant with a .314 batting average, but a serious ankle injury the next year led to his trade to the Cubs before the 1977 season. The Cubs moved him to first base, and he won the National League (NL) batting title with a .324 mark in 1980. He was named to the All-Star team the following year as he led the major leagues in doubles. After setting a major league record for first basemen with 159 assists in 1982, Buckner surpassed that total with 161 in 1983 while again leading the NL in doubles. Feuds with team management over a loss of playing time resulted in him being traded to the Red Sox in the middle of the 1984 season.

During the 1985 season, Buckner started all 162 games and shattered his own record with 184 assists. Toward the end of the 1986 season, he was hobbled by leg injuries and struggled throughout the playoffs. His tenth-inning error in Game 6 of the 1986 World Series against the New York Mets remains one of the most memorable plays in baseball history; it was long considered part of a curse on the Red Sox that kept them from winning the World Series for 86 years, and led to years of fan anger and public mockery that Buckner handled graciously before being embraced by Red Sox fans again after their 2004 World Series victory.

After spending his last few seasons with the California Angels, Kansas City Royals, and Red Sox, Buckner became the 21st player in major league history to play in four decades. He ended his career with 2,715 hits and 498 doubles, having batted over .300 seven times with three seasons of 100 runs batted in (RBI). Buckner led his league in assists four times, with his 1985 mark remaining the American League (AL) record. He retired with the fourth-most assists by a first baseman (1,351) in major league history despite not playing the position regularly until he was 27 years old. After retiring as a player, Buckner became a real estate developer in Idaho. He coached a number of Minor League Baseball (MiLB) teams before leaving baseball in 2014.

== Early years ==
Buckner was born in Vallejo, California, and grew up in nearby American Canyon. He and his brothers Bob and Jim, and Jim's twin sister Jan, were raised by their parents, Leonard and Marie Katherine Buckner; his father died in 1966, when Bill was a teenager. His mother was a stenographer for the California Highway Patrol.

He graduated from Napa High School in 1968 after playing on the school's baseball and football teams. While playing football, he was a two-time All-State receiver and also achieved All-America honors twice.

As a baseball player at Napa High School, Buckner hit .667 in 1967 and .529 in 1968 under coach Dale Fisher. As a football player, Buckner is still in the Napa record lists for reception yards in a season (579), career reception yards (963), and career receptions (61). At first, Buckner contemplated attending Stanford or USC, but he eventually chose professional baseball instead.

Buckner was selected by the Los Angeles Dodgers in the second round of the 1968 Major League Baseball draft; his friend Bobby Valentine was the Dodgers' first-round pick. Upon signing with the Dodgers, Buckner was assigned to the Ogden Dodgers of the Pioneer League. He also briefly attended Los Angeles Valley College, the USC school of Business Administration, and Arizona State University. He became a member of the Sigma Chi fraternity while a farmhand with the Dodgers, and roomed with Valentine while attending USC after his first professional season.

== Career ==
=== Minor leagues (1968–1970) ===
At age 18, Buckner made his professional debut playing with the Ogden Dodgers of the Rookie Pioneer league in 1968, hitting .344 with 4 home runs and 44 RBI in 64 games. He was teammates with Valentine and Steve Garvey, who also were playing in their first professional seasons. The manager at Ogden was Tommy Lasorda.

In 1969, Buckner played with four Dodger teams, as he advanced quickly in the Dodgers' farm system. He hit .350 with 6 home runs and 36 RBI in 46 games with the Dodgers team in the Arizona Instructional League. He then batted .307 with 7 home runs and 50 RBI with the Class AA Albuquerque Dodgers, and .315 with 2 home runs and 27 RBI in 36 games with the Class AAA Spokane Indians of the Pacific Coast League. While at Spokane, Buckner's manager was once again Lasorda. Buckner was called up to the Dodgers late in the season at age 19, popping up to second base as a pinch hitter for Jim Brewer in the 9th inning of a 4–3 road loss to the San Francisco Giants on September 21 in his only appearance.

Buckner spent April 1970 with the Dodgers, picking up his first hit in a 5–2 loss to the Cincinnati Reds on April 8, but after batting .121 with no home runs or RBI, he was returned to Triple-A Spokane, where he played 111 games under Lasorda after he was given leave to complete finals at USC. He hit .335 with 3 home runs and 74 RBI, playing alongside Garvey, Valentine, Davey Lopes, Tom Paciorek, Bill Russell, Charlie Hough, and Doyle Alexander, among others. Buckner played most of the 1970 season with a broken jaw and with his jaw wired shut. Spokane finished 94–52, and Buckner was again called up to the Dodgers in September. He batted .257 in the final month, with 4 RBI and 5 runs scored.

=== Los Angeles Dodgers (1971–1976) ===
Buckner earned a starting job with the Dodgers in 1971 as their opening-day right fielder, and hit his first career home run off Don Wilson of the Houston Astros on April 6, providing the only scoring in a 2–0 road win. Buckner also played some first base with the Dodgers, making 87 starts at first in 1973. However, when Steve Garvey emerged as a Gold Glove first baseman and the National League's Most Valuable Player the following season, Buckner was shifted to left field permanently. Buckner played a supporting role in a baseball milestone on April 8, 1974. Playing left field, he climbed the fence in an attempt to catch Hank Aaron's record 715th home run. He also played in his first World Series that year, which the Dodgers lost to the Oakland Athletics in five games; Buckner hit .250 in the Series, including a home run off Catfish Hunter in Game 3, a 3–2 road loss.

Buckner suffered an injury on April 18 in the 1975 season that saw him flip over when his foot caught under the bag on an attempted slide. He gamely played the rest of the year hurt and had a tendon removed in September and bone chips removed in October. Ultimately, he never fully recovered from the injury, which saw him soak his feet in ice for multiple years before games.

In his Dodgers career, Buckner batted .289 with 38 home runs and 277 runs batted in in 773 games.

=== Chicago Cubs (1977–1984) ===
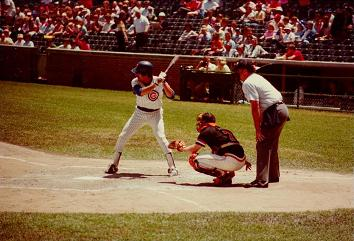
Buckner batting at Wrigley Field on June 11, 1981

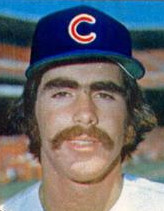
Baseball card of Bill Buckner when playing for the Chicago Cubs

Following the 1976 season, Buckner was traded with Iván DeJesús and Jeff Albert to the Chicago Cubs for Rick Monday and Mike Garman.

Whereas early indications seemed to lean toward the Dodgers getting the better end of this deal – with Monday becoming one of the key centerpieces of the Dodgers clubs that went to the 1977 and 1978 World Series – Buckner soon emerged as something of a star for the beleaguered Cubs. On May 17, 1979, in a famous slugfest at Wrigley Field in which the Cubs lost 23–22 to the Philadelphia Phillies, with three homers by Dave Kingman and two by Mike Schmidt, Buckner went 4–for–7 with a grand slam off Tug McGraw and a career-high seven RBI. But when manager Herman Franks resigned late in the season, he made negative comments about several players, including calling Buckner "nuts".

In 1980 Buckner won the NL batting title with a .324 average. He also struck out only 18 times – once every 32 at bats – batting in front of Kingman. Keith Hernandez (.321) and Garry Templeton (.319) finished just behind Buckner in the race for the NL batting title. In the strike-interrupted 1981 season, he batted .311 while tying Cecil Cooper for the major league lead with 35 doubles; he was the Cubs' sole representative at the All-Star Game, where he grounded out to first base pinch hitting for Manny Trillo in the 9th inning of a 5–4 NL victory, their 10th consecutive All-Star win. In 1982 Buckner batted over .300 for the fourth time in Chicago, picked up a career-high 201 hits, drove in 105 runs – the first time he had topped 75 – and recorded 159 assists at first base, breaking Mickey Vernon's 1949 major league record of 155. In 1983 he again led the NL with 38 doubles, but saw his batting average drop to .280, his lowest mark in eight years.

During the 1984 season, Buckner saw a loss of playing time at first base to Leon Durham. Because of his lack of playing time, Buckner was at odds with the Cubs management; in protest, he vowed not to shave until he played two games in a row at first base. Buckner finally shaved between games of a doubleheader on May 24, because he found out he was going to be traded the next day to the Boston Red Sox; the Cubs went on to win their division, reaching the postseason for the first time in 39 years. In eight seasons with the Cubs, Buckner hit .300 with 81 home runs, 235 doubles, and 516 RBI in 974 games.

=== Boston Red Sox (1984–1987) ===
Early in the 1984 season, the Red Sox were in the market for an upgrade at first base. On May 25, they acquired Buckner from the Cubs for Dennis Eckersley and Mike Brumley. On September 21, Buckner enjoyed the first five-hit game of his career in an 8–0 road win over the Baltimore Orioles.

Buckner appeared in all 162 games for the Red Sox in 1985, and batted .299 with 16 home runs while posting career highs with 110 RBI, 201 hits, and 46 doubles. He was a prototypical contact hitter, and struck out just 36 times in 719 plate appearances to lead the American League in that category in 1985. (He also led the NL in most at bats per strikeout in 1980, 1982 and 1986, and placed second in 1979, 1981, 1983, and 1987.) In 1985, he also extended his own major league record for assists in a season with 184.

On June 5, 1986, Buckner picked up his 1,000th career RBI on a ground out in a 7–5 road loss to the Milwaukee Brewers. On August 21, he again had five hits in a blowout 24–5 road win over the Cleveland Indians. In September, he hit .340 with eight home runs and 22 RBI, while missing just three games in spite of chronic ankle soreness. Dave Stapleton, the Red Sox first baseman before the acquisition of Buckner, began seeing more playing time as a late-inning defensive replacement in September and October. That season, Buckner hit a career-high 18 home runs, drove in more than 100 runs for the second season in a row, and was a key member of the team that won the American League East by 5 1/2 games. He entered Game 5 of the 1986 American League Championship Series batting just .111 in the Series, and was zero for three in the game when he singled to start a ninth-inning rally which was capped off by Dave Henderson's famous home run.

==== 1986 World Series ====
Buckner watches his misplayed ground ball as Mookie Wilson goes to first.

The 1986 Red Sox were leading the heavily favored New York Mets three games to two in the 1986 World Series when Game 6 went into extra innings. For his part, Buckner was batting just .143 against Mets pitching, and he was 0–for–5 in Game 6. When the Red Sox scored two runs in the top of the tenth, Boston manager John McNamara chose to have Buckner take the field in the bottom of the inning instead of bringing Stapleton in as a defensive replacement for the ailing Buckner, as he had in Games 1, 2, and 5.

With two outs and no one on base, New York struck back with three straight singles off Calvin Schiraldi, and tied the game on a wild pitch by Bob Stanley. Mookie Wilson fouled off several pitches before hitting a slow roller to Buckner at first base. Aware of Wilson's speed, Buckner tried to rush the play. As a result, the ball rolled to the left side of his glove, through his legs, and into shallow right field, allowing Ray Knight to score the winning run from second base. Had Buckner fielded the ball with Wilson safe at first, the score would have remained tied for the next Mets batter. Had Buckner put out Wilson at first base, Game 6 would have gone to an 11th inning.

Boston led Game 7 by a 3–0 score heading into the bottom of the sixth inning when New York rallied again, scoring 3 runs off Bruce Hurst to tie the game, and 3 more off Schiraldi in the seventh to take a 6–3 lead. Buckner was two for four in the game, and scored one of Boston's two runs in the eighth. However, the Mets also scored twice in the eighth, and won 8–5 for their second and most recent World Series championship.

==== Fallout ====
Regardless of any of the other perceived shortcomings that led to Boston's loss in the 1986 World Series, Buckner's error epitomized the "Curse of the Bambino" in the minds of Red Sox fans, and he soon became the scapegoat for a frustrated fan base. Buckner began receiving death threats and was heckled and booed by some of his own home fans, often with the false belief or implication that his play alone could have instantly won the series for the Red Sox. Meanwhile, he was the focal point of derision from the fans of opposing teams on the road—especially when he faced the Mets in spring training of 1987—and during his first regular-season at bat at Yankee Stadium. He made his 2,500th career hit on May 19, an RBI single in a 4–1 road loss to the Kansas City Royals, but the Red Sox released Buckner on July 23 after he recorded a .273 batting average, two home runs, and 42 RBI in 75 games.

=== California Angels (1987–1988) ===
Upon his release from the Red Sox, Buckner signed with the California Angels. For the remainder of the 1987 season, Buckner batted .306 and drove in 32 runs in 57 games. In 76 total games with the Angels, Buckner hit .288 with three home runs and 41 RBI.

=== Kansas City Royals (1988–1989) ===
At 38 years old, Buckner was released by the Angels on May 9, 1988, just before a road trip that would have brought him to the east coast to face the Yankees and Red Sox. He signed with the Royals shortly after his release and walked into Fenway Park as a player for the opposing team for the first time on July 15. He went one for two with a walk off Roger Clemens.

In 168 games with the Royals, Buckner hit .239 with four home runs and 50 RBI.

=== Second Red Sox stint (1990) ===
Buckner returned to the Red Sox in 1990 as a free agent and received a standing ovation from the crowd during player introductions at the home opener on April 9.

Buckner's last home run was against Kirk McCaskill on April 25, 1990, at Fenway Park, the only inside-the-park home run of his career. Despite being one of the slowest runners in baseball, the 40-year-old Buckner circled the bases in the fourth inning when Angels outfielder Claudell Washington crashed into Fenway's three-foot high right-field wall and somersaulted into the front row of seats.

His return was short-lived; he retired on June 5 with a .186 batting average, one home run, and three RBI that season. In 526 career games with Boston, Buckner hit .279 with 48 home runs, 112 doubles, and 324 RBI.

== Career stats ==
Buckner was a speedy baserunner until his ankle surgeries in 1975 and 1976 for a severe ankle sprain and bone chips, respectively. He twice finished in the top 10 in the league in stolen bases (1974 and 1976) and twice led the league in doubles (1981 and 1983). After moving to first base, he played 1,555 regular-season games and made only 128 errors in 13,901 chances.

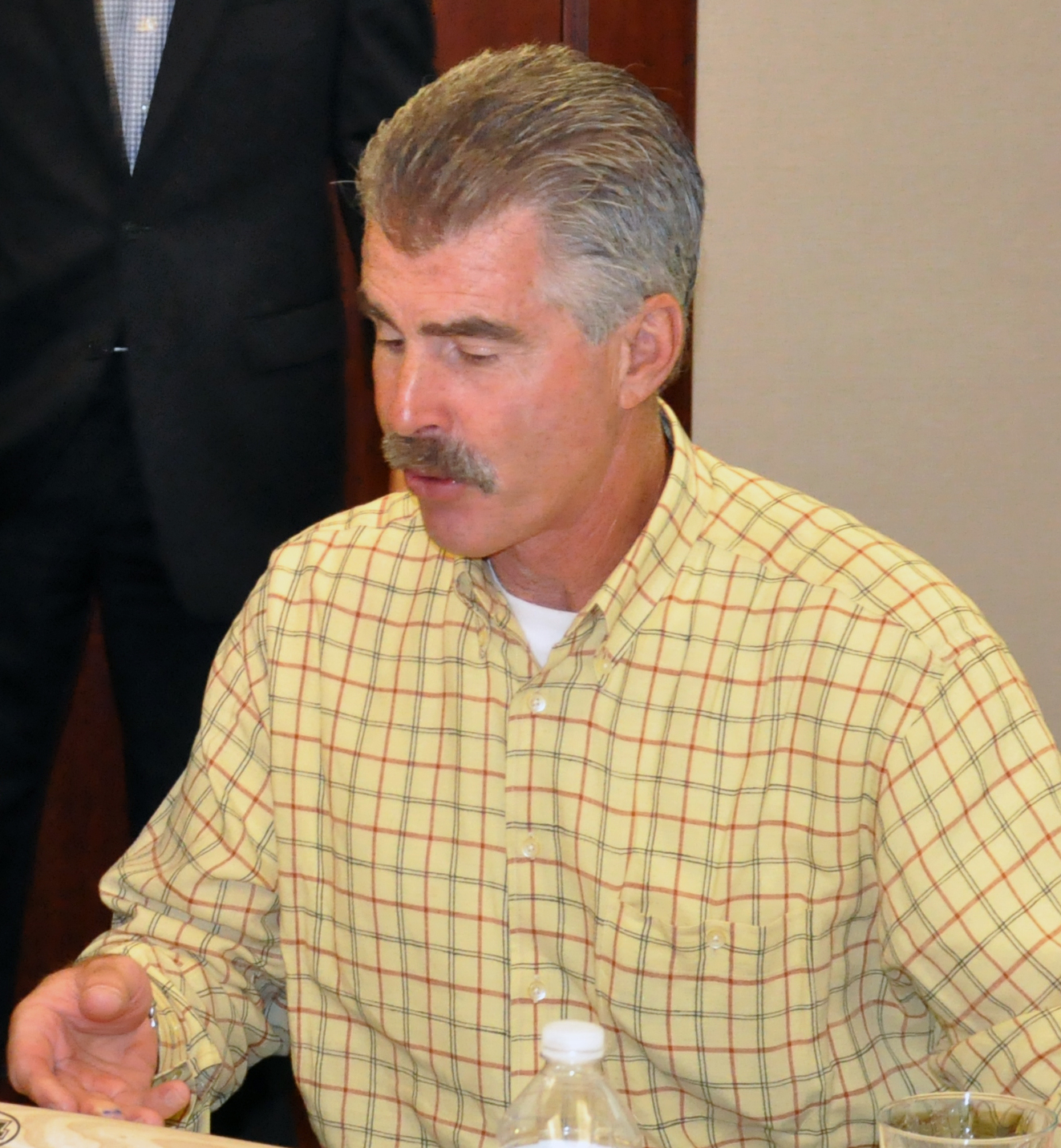
Buckner signing autographs in 2011

In 2,517 games over 22 seasons, Buckner batted .289 (2,715–for–9,397) with 1,077 runs scored, 498 doubles, 49 triples, 174 home runs, 1,208 RBI, 183 stolen bases, 450 walks, an on-base percentage of .321, and a slugging percentage of .408. Defensively, he recorded a .991 fielding percentage at first base and at left and right field.

== Post-playing career ==
After Buckner retired from baseball, he moved his family to Idaho where he invested in real estate in the Boise area. One of the housing subdivisions that he developed is named "Fenway Park".

On April 8, 2008, Buckner threw out the first pitch to former teammate Dwight Evans at the Red Sox home opener as they unfurled their 2007 World Series championship banner. He received a two-minute standing ovation from the sell-out crowd. After the game, when asked if he had any second thoughts about appearing at the game, he said, "I really had to forgive, not the fans of Boston, per se, but I would have to say in my heart I had to forgive the media for what they put me and my family through. So, you know, I've done that and I'm over that."

On January 4, 2011, Buckner was named the manager of the Brockton Rox of the Can-Am League. The Rox posted a 51–42 record in 2011, but after the season, the Rox dropped the professional format to join the Futures Collegiate Baseball League.

In December 2011, Buckner became the hitting instructor for the Boise Hawks for the 2012 season. The Hawks were the Chicago Cubs affiliate in the Class A-Short Season Northwest League. Buckner announced his retirement from baseball on March 3, 2014. Buckner was inducted into the Napa High School Hall Of Fame in 1997 and the CIF Sac-Joaquin Section Hall of Fame in 2010.

Buckner was inducted into the Baseball Reliquary's Shrine of the Eternals in 2008 and into the Chicago Cubs Hall of Fame posthumously in 2021.

== Personal life ==
Buckner and his wife Jody had two daughters, Brittany and Christen, and a son, Bobby. Bobby was a member of the Texas A&M–Corpus Christi Islanders baseball team.

=== Death ===
Buckner died on May 27, 2019, of Lewy body dementia at the age of 69. He was surrounded by his wife Jody and three children at the time of his death.

In a statement, Buckner's family said, "Bill fought with courage and grit as he did all things in life. Our hearts are broken but we are at peace knowing he is in the arms of his Lord and Savior Jesus Christ." Buckner's funeral service was held at Calvary Chapel in Boise, Idaho.

== References in popular culture ==
In the 1974 episode of the TV series Emergency! entitled “Nagging Suspicion,” Buckner is mentioned as “batting .300” by one of the fire fighters reading the newspaper. The series is set in Los Angeles and at the time Buckner was playing for the Dodgers. Charlie Sheen purchased the "Buckner Ball" at auction in 1992 for $93,000, and for a long time, it resided in the collection of songwriter and Mets fan Seth Swirsky, who refers to it as the "Mookie Ball". The ball was on loan for a time from Swirsky to the Mets to display in their Hall of Fame and Museum, and it was among the most popular artifacts for fans to see. On May 3, 2012, Swirsky sold the ball through Heritage Auctions for $418,250.

Buckner made a cameo appearance at the beginning of the sports parody film The Comebacks and was featured in an episode of the HBO series Curb Your Enthusiasm. He also made a cameo appearance in the pilot episode of the short-lived sitcom Inside Schwartz, advising the title character to "just let it go". In 1995, Buckner appeared along with Michael Jordan, Stan Musial, Willie Mays and Ken Griffey Jr. in a commercial for the shoemaker Nike in which Spike Lee, in character as Mars Blackmon, compares Jordan's baseball skills to Musial, Mays, Griffey and Buckner. The punch line is a visual reference to Buckner's 1986 World Series error. His famous 1986 World Series miscue is also referenced in the films Celtic Pride, Rounders, and Fever Pitch. The play is also referenced in an episode of The Simpsons titled "Brother's Little Helper" and in the musical Johnny Baseball. On October 23, 2008, during former Federal Reserve chairman Alan Greenspan's testimony in House hearings on the 2008 financial crisis, Representative John Yarmuth referred to Greenspan as one of "three Bill Buckners". Buckner and Mookie Wilson appeared in an MLB Network commercial for the 2016 postseason, "Catching Up", marking the 30th anniversary of the 1986 World Series and their roles in it.

Buckner is mentioned in The Areas of My Expertise in a series of New England sports references. In the book, John Hodgman describes a (fictional) radio personality and recounts the premonition she had regarding Buckner's infamous error in Game 6 of the 1986 World Series.

The Leonard P. Zakim Bunker Hill Memorial Bridge, in Boston, is colloquially referred to by locals as the Bill Buckner Bridge because traffic goes between the "legs" of the bridge, like Buckner's 1986 World Series fielding error. The nickname is now spoken fondly, since Buckner and Sox fans thought fondly of each other after the 2004 World Series win.

In the season 2, episode 16 episode of Boston Legal, Tom Selleck's fiancée needs to be reminded of a tragedy to break out of uncontrolled laughter. The first time this has to be done he reminds her that Bambi's mother was shot. The second time Selleck simply says, "Bill Buckner."

== See also ==
- List of Major League Baseball career hits leaders
- List of Major League Baseball career doubles leaders
- List of Major League Baseball career runs batted in leaders
- List of Major League Baseball career runs scored leaders
- List of Major League Baseball batting champions
- List of Major League Baseball annual doubles leaders
- List of Major League Baseball players who played in four decades

Awards and achievements
| Preceded by Mike Schmidt | National League Player of the Month; August 1982 | Succeeded by Claudell Washington |
